= Charles Jervas =

Irish painter and translator

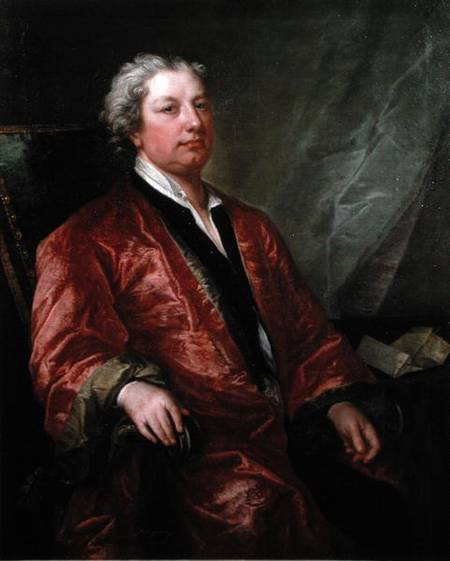
- Self-portrait, c. 1725
- Born: c. 1675; Shinrone, County Offaly
- Died: 2 November 1739 (aged 63–64); London, England
- Known for: Portrait painting
- Spouse: Penelope Hume
- Patrons: George I, George II

Charles Jervas (also Jarvis, Jervis, and Gervais; c. 1675 – 2 November 1739) was an Irish painter, translator, and art collector of the early 18th century.

== Early life ==
Born in Shinrone, County Offaly, Ireland around 1675, the son of John Jervas and Elizabeth, daughter of Captain John Baldwin of Shinrone Castle & Corolanty, High Sheriff of King's County. Jervas studied in London, England, as an assistant under Sir Godfrey Kneller between 1694 and 1695.

After selling a series of small copies of the Raphael Cartoons circa 1698 to Dr. George Clarke of All Souls College, Oxford, the following year he travelled to Paris and Rome (while financially supported by Clarke and others) remaining there for most of the decade before returning to London in 1709 where he found success as a portrait painter.

== Career ==
Painting portraits of the city's intellectuals, among them such personal friends as Jonathan Swift and the poet Alexander Pope (both now in the National Portrait Gallery, London), Jervas became a popular artist often referred to in the works of literary figures of the period. Jervas gave painting lessons to Pope at his house in Cleveland Court, St James's, which Pope mentions in his poem, To Belinda on the Rape of the Lock, written 1713, published 1717 in Poems on Several Occasions.

Pope's verse Epistle to Mr Jervas, written circa 1715, was published in the 1716 edition of John Dryden's 1695 translation of Fresnoy's Art of Painting (Charles Alphonse Du Fresnoy's De arte graphica, 1668). In it, Pope refers to Jervas's skill as an artist:

O, lasting as those colours may they shine,

Free as they stroke, yet faultless as thy line;

New graces yearly like thy works display,

Soft without weakness, without glaring gay!

With his growing reputation, Jervas succeeded Kneller as Principal Painter in Ordinary to King George I in 1723, and subsequently King George II. In 1727 he married Penelope Hume, a wealthy widow with a supposed fortune of £20,000, and moved to Hampton, London. He continued to live in London until his death in 1739.

His translation of Miguel de Cervantes' novel Don Quixote, published posthumously in 1742 as being made by Charles "Jarvis" – because of a printer's error – has since come to be known as "the Jarvis translation". Jervas was first to provide an introduction to the novel including a critical analysis of previous translations of Don Quixote. It has been highly praised as the most accurate translation of the novel up to that time, but also strongly criticised for being stiff and humourless, although it went through many printings during the 19th century.

== Legacy ==
As principal portraitist to the British monarch, Jervas was known for his vanity and luck, as mentioned in the Imperial Biographical Dictionary, "He married a widow with $20,000; and his natural self-conceit was greatly encouraged by his intimate friend [Alexander] Pope, who has written an epistle full of silly flattery." According to one account, after comparing a painting he had copied from Titian, he was said to have stated "Poor little Tit, how he would starve!" Upon being told that Jervas had set up a carriage with four horses, Kneller replied: "Ach, mein Gott, if his horses do not draw better than he does, he will never get to his journey's end."

== Gallery ==
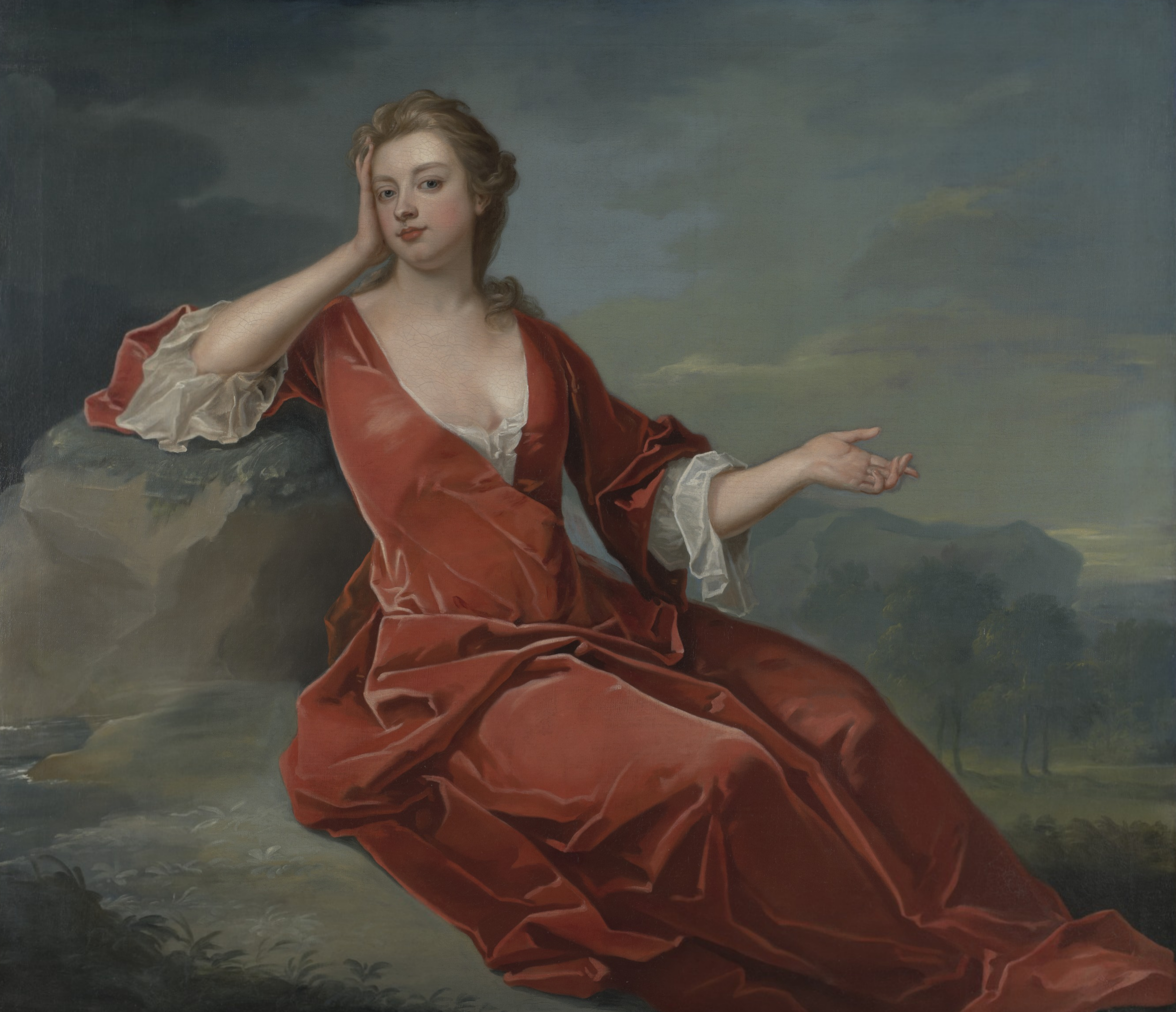
Sarah, Duchess of Marlborough (c. 1700)

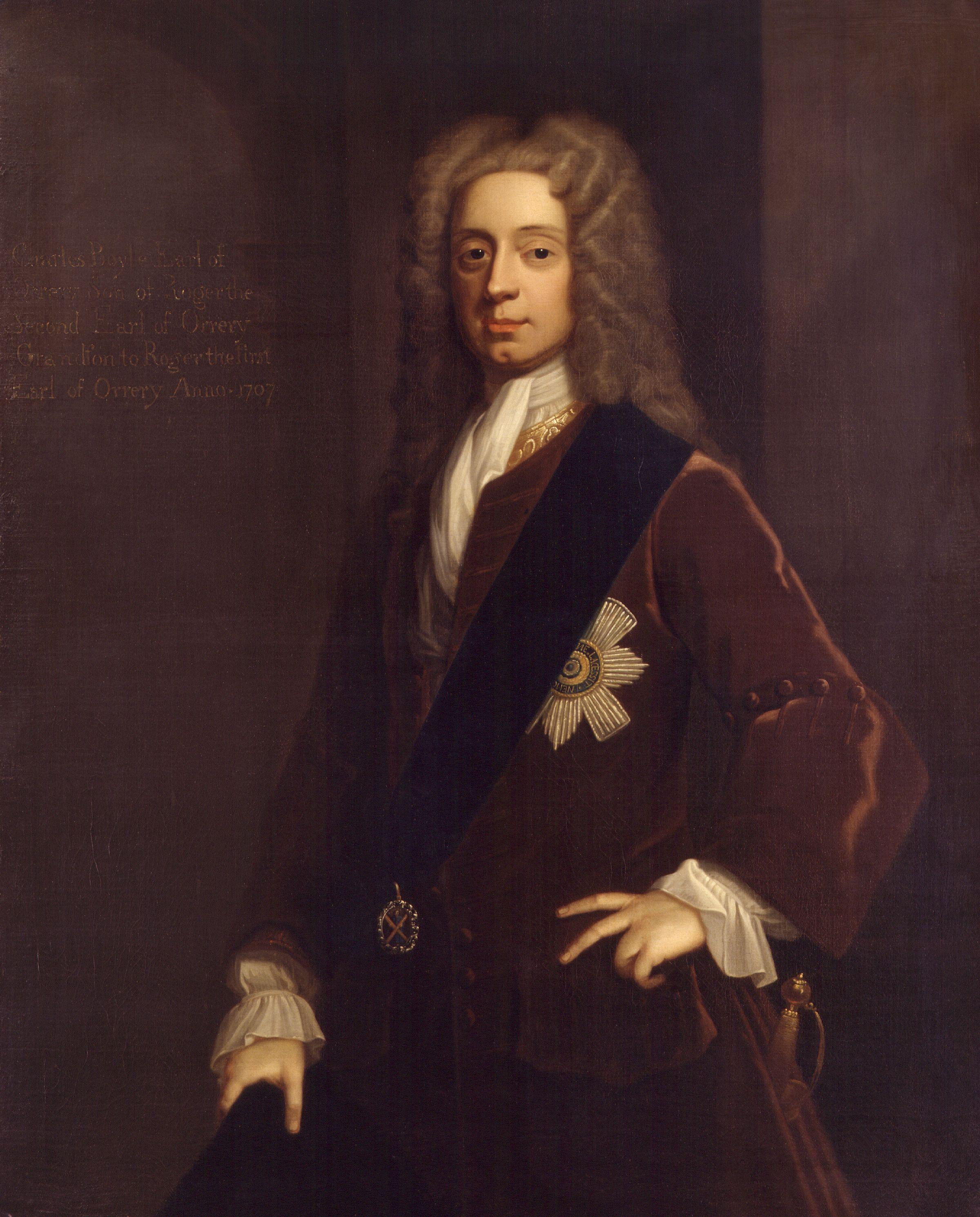
Charles Boyle, 4th Earl of Orrery (1707)

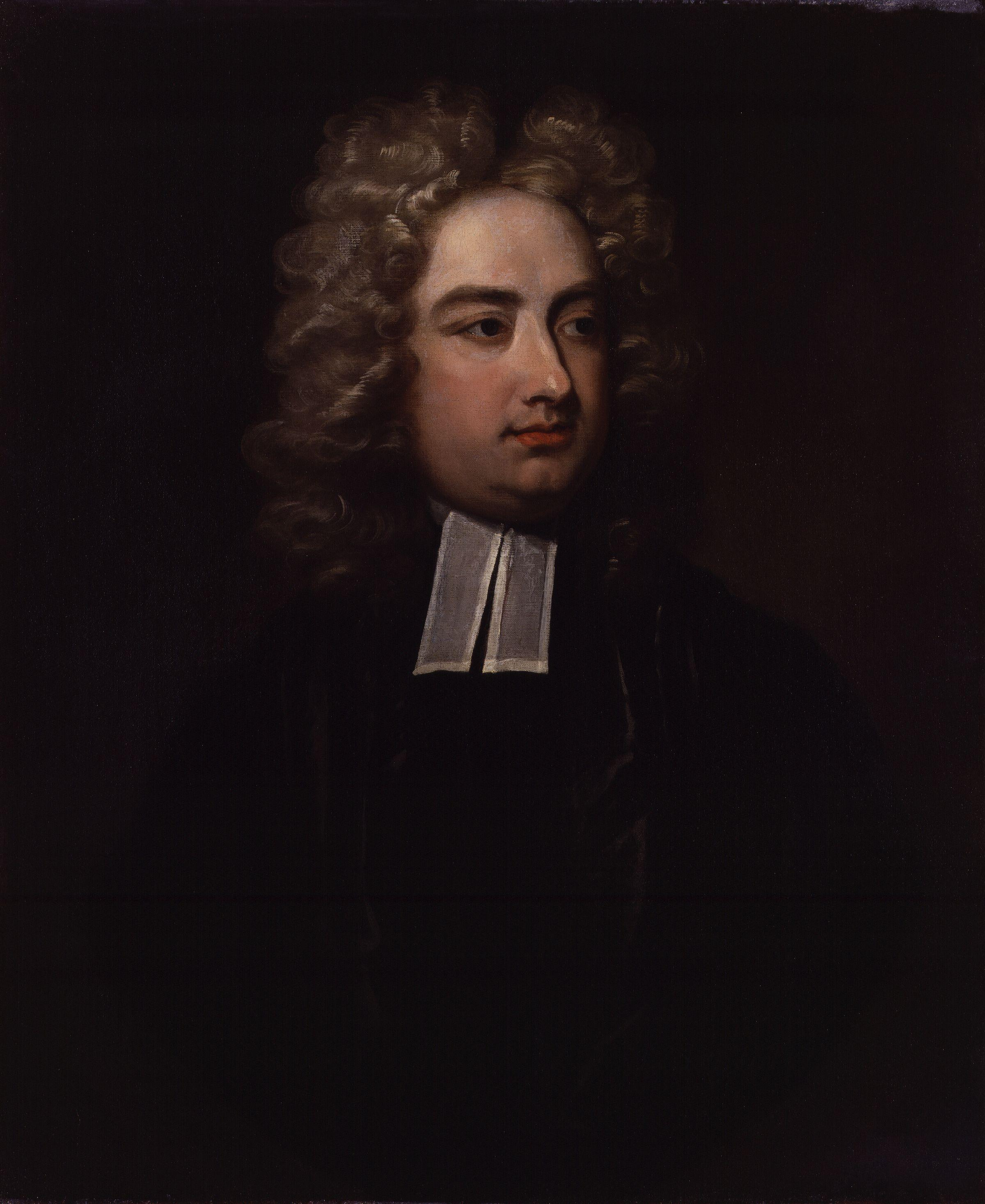
Jonathan Swift (1710)

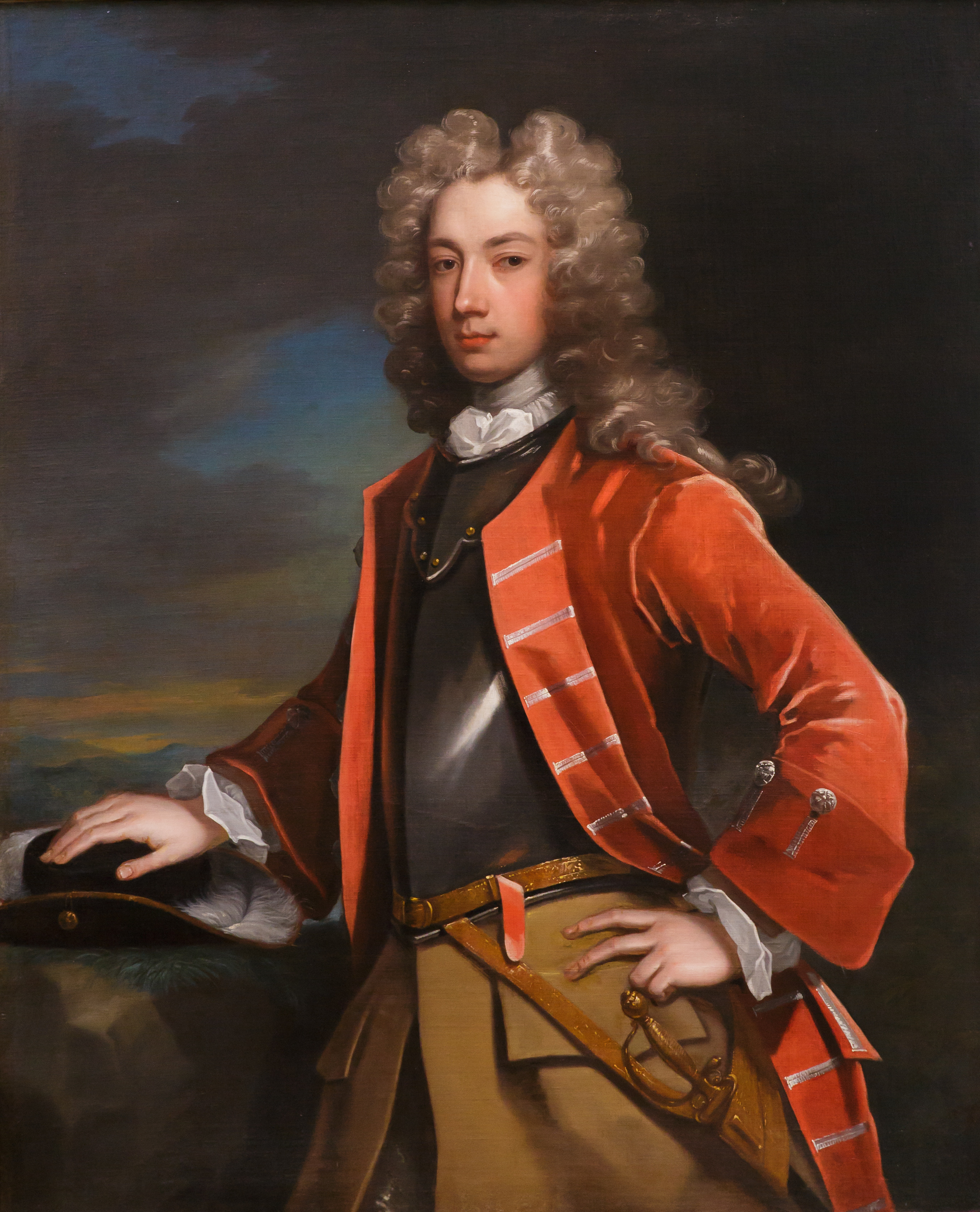
Charles Coote, 4th Earl of Mountrath (c. 1710)

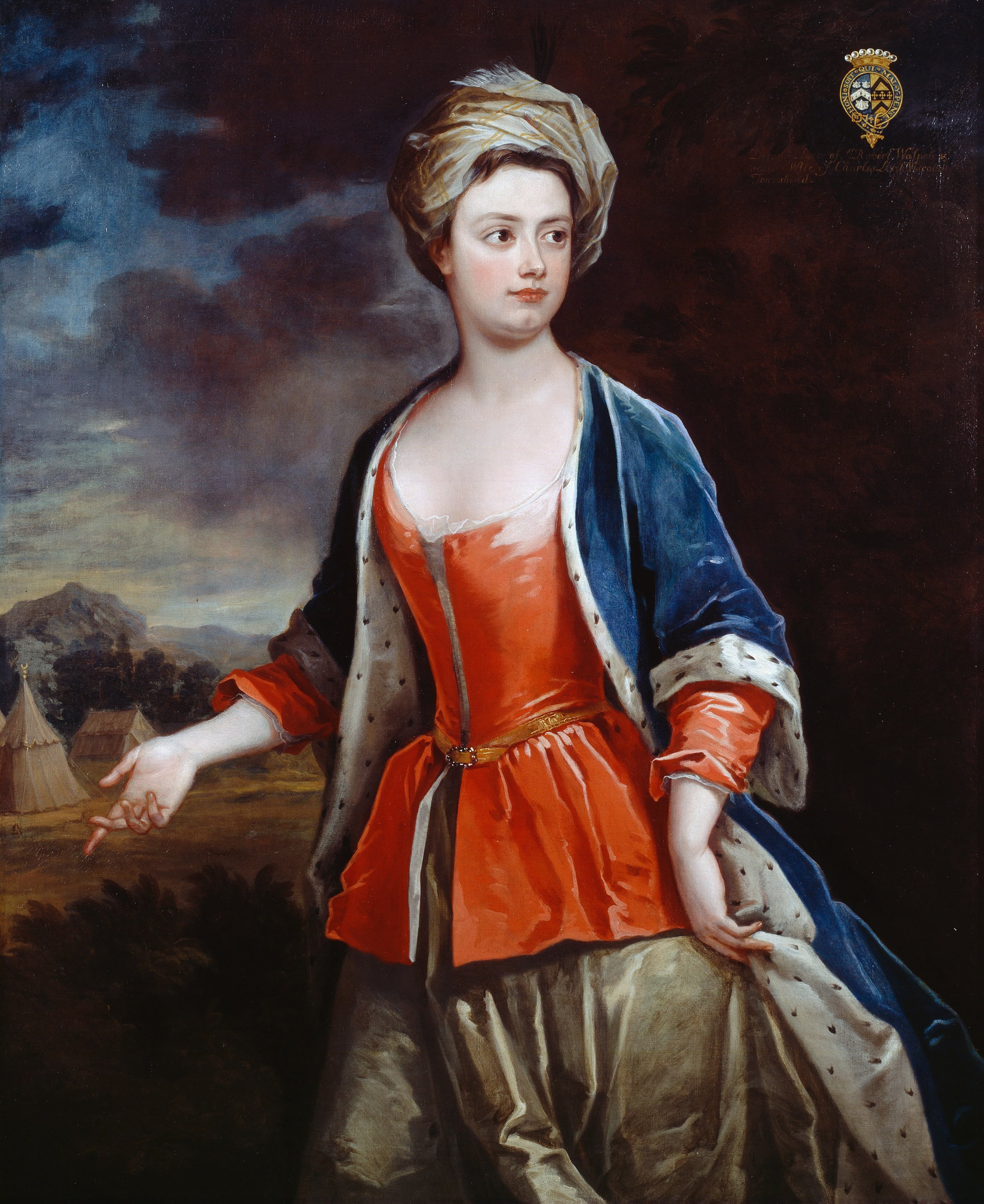
Dorothy, Viscountess Townshend (c. 1718)

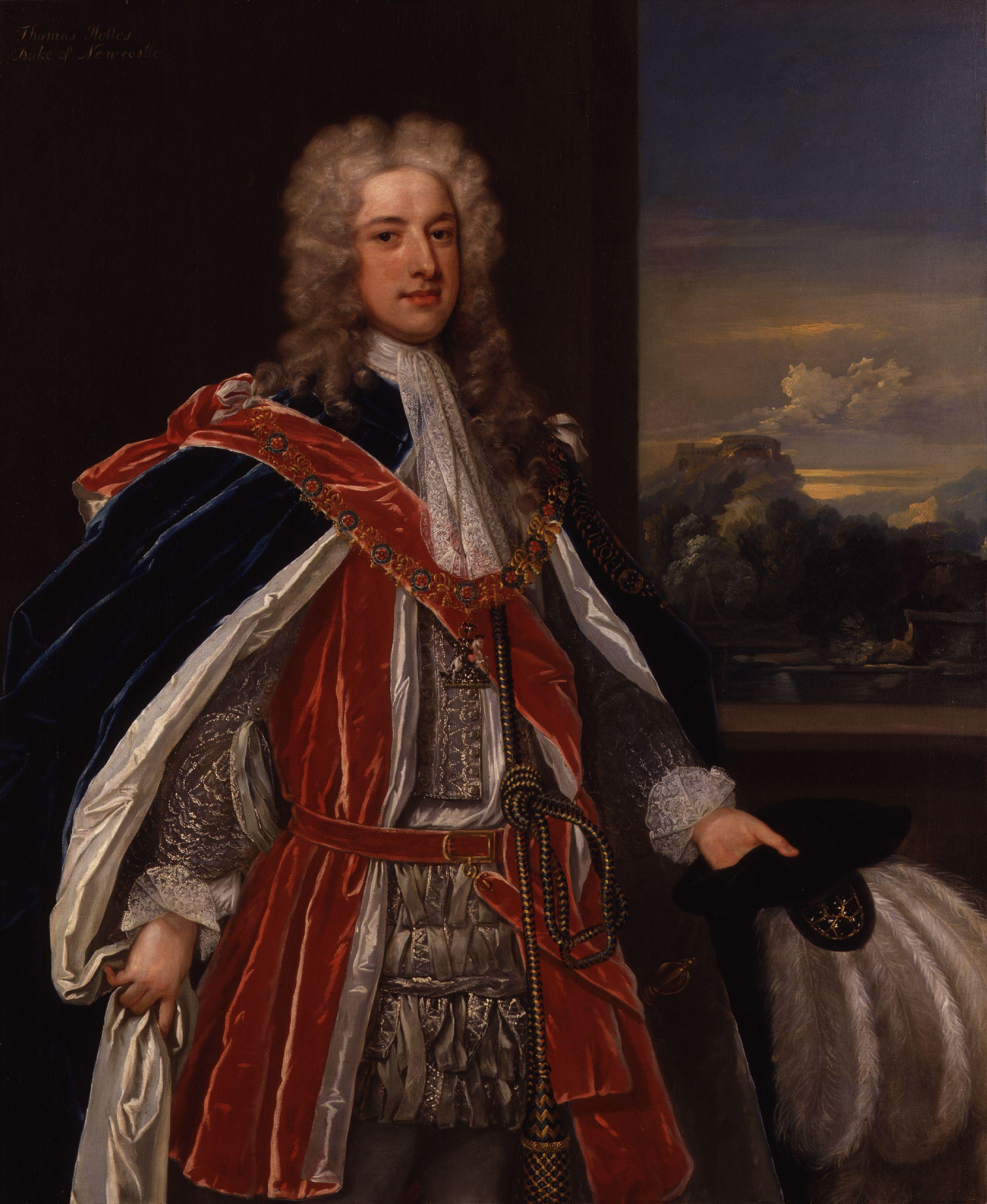
Thomas Pelham-Holles, 1st Duke of Newcastle-under-Lyne (c. 1721)

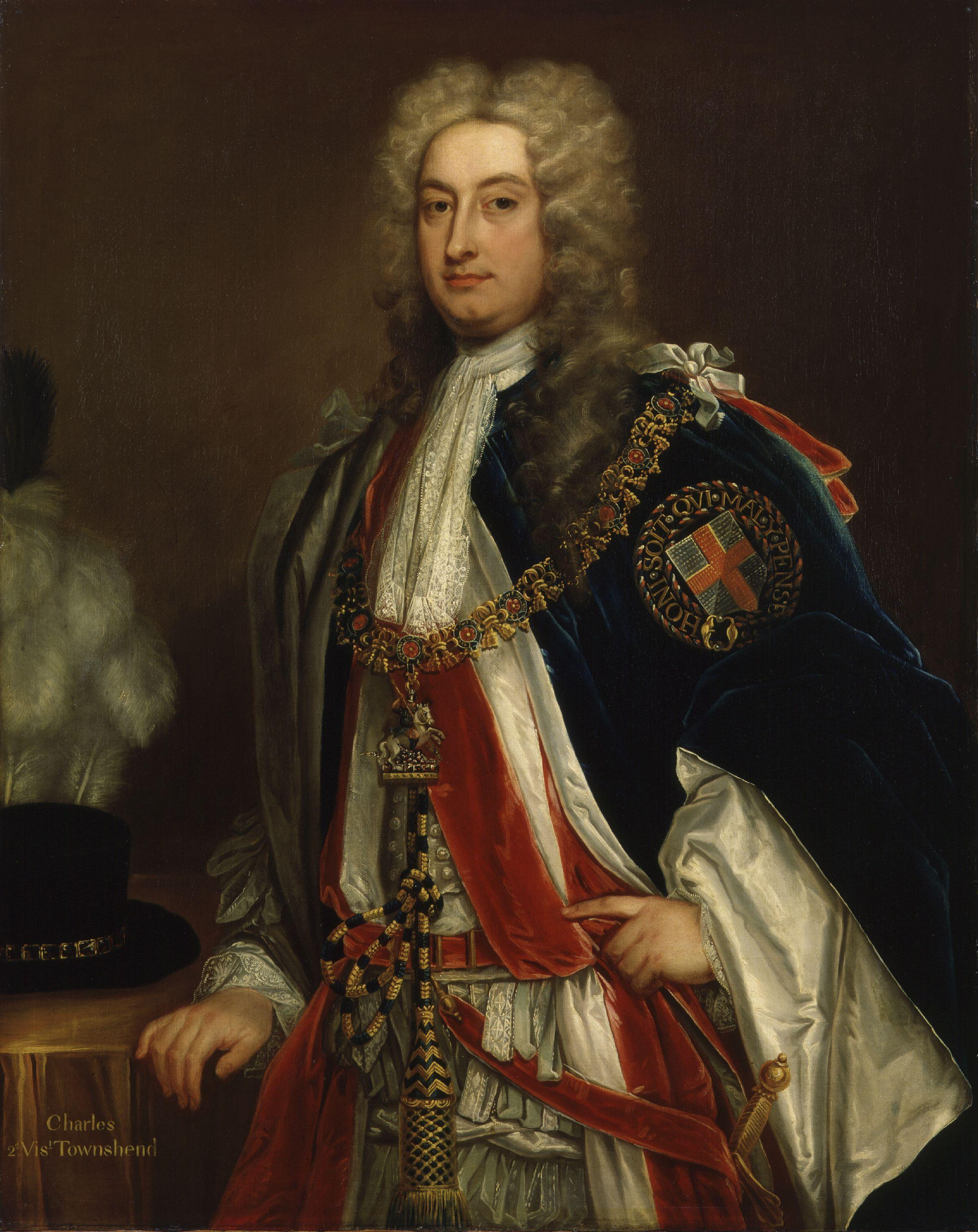
Charles Townshend, 2nd Viscount Townshend (c. 1724)

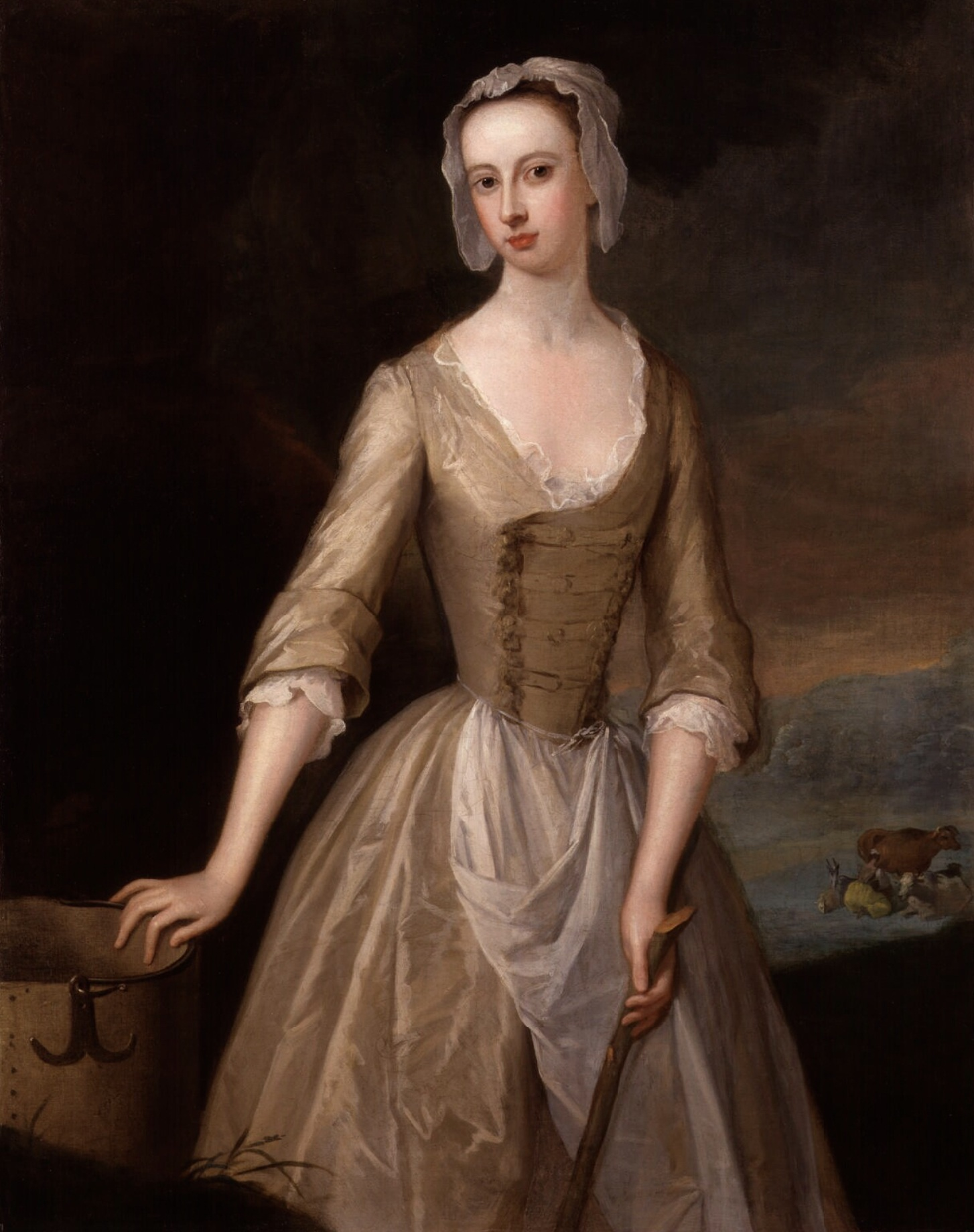
Catherine Douglas, Duchess of Queensberry (c. 1725–1730)

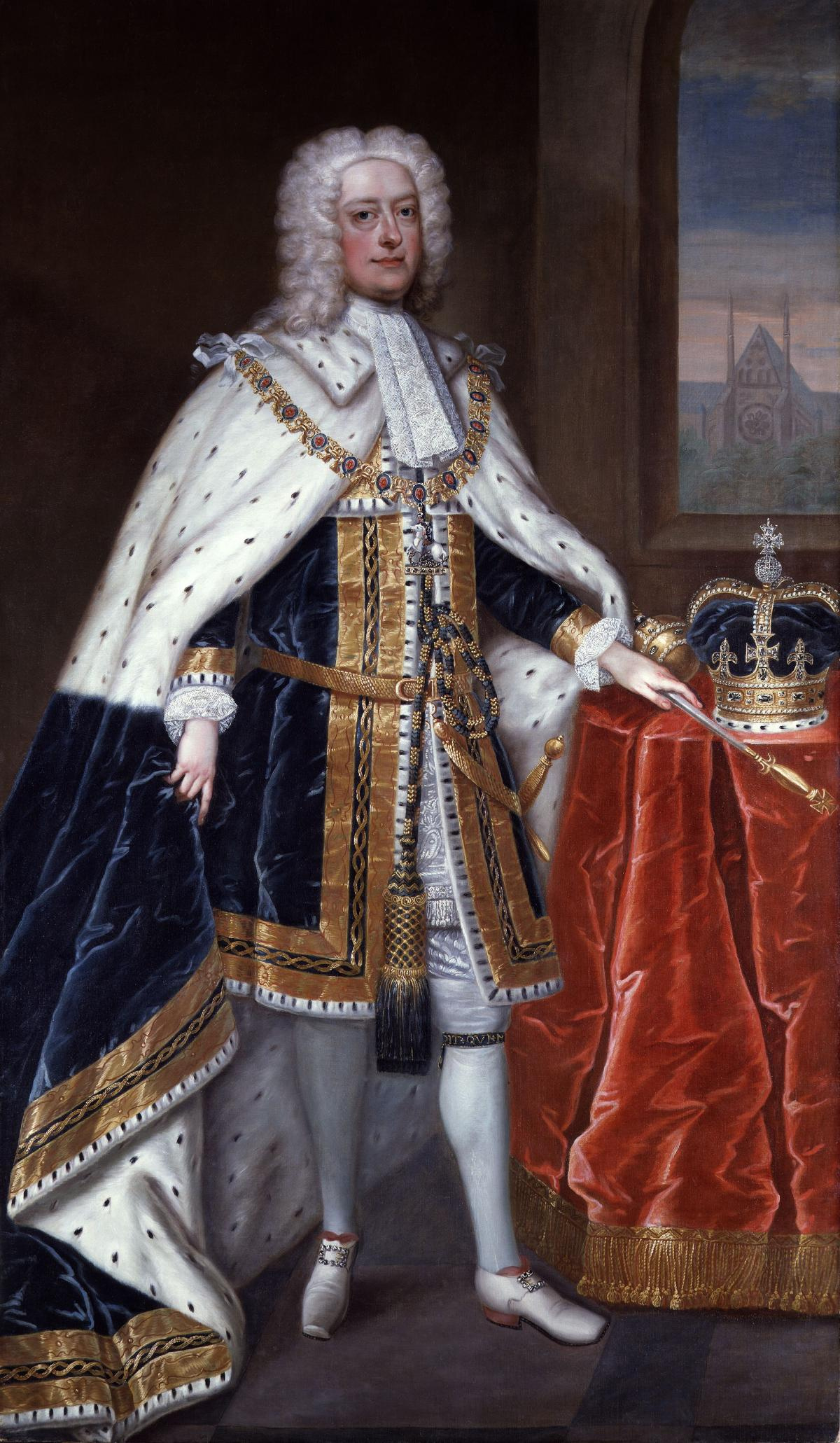
King George II (c. 1727)

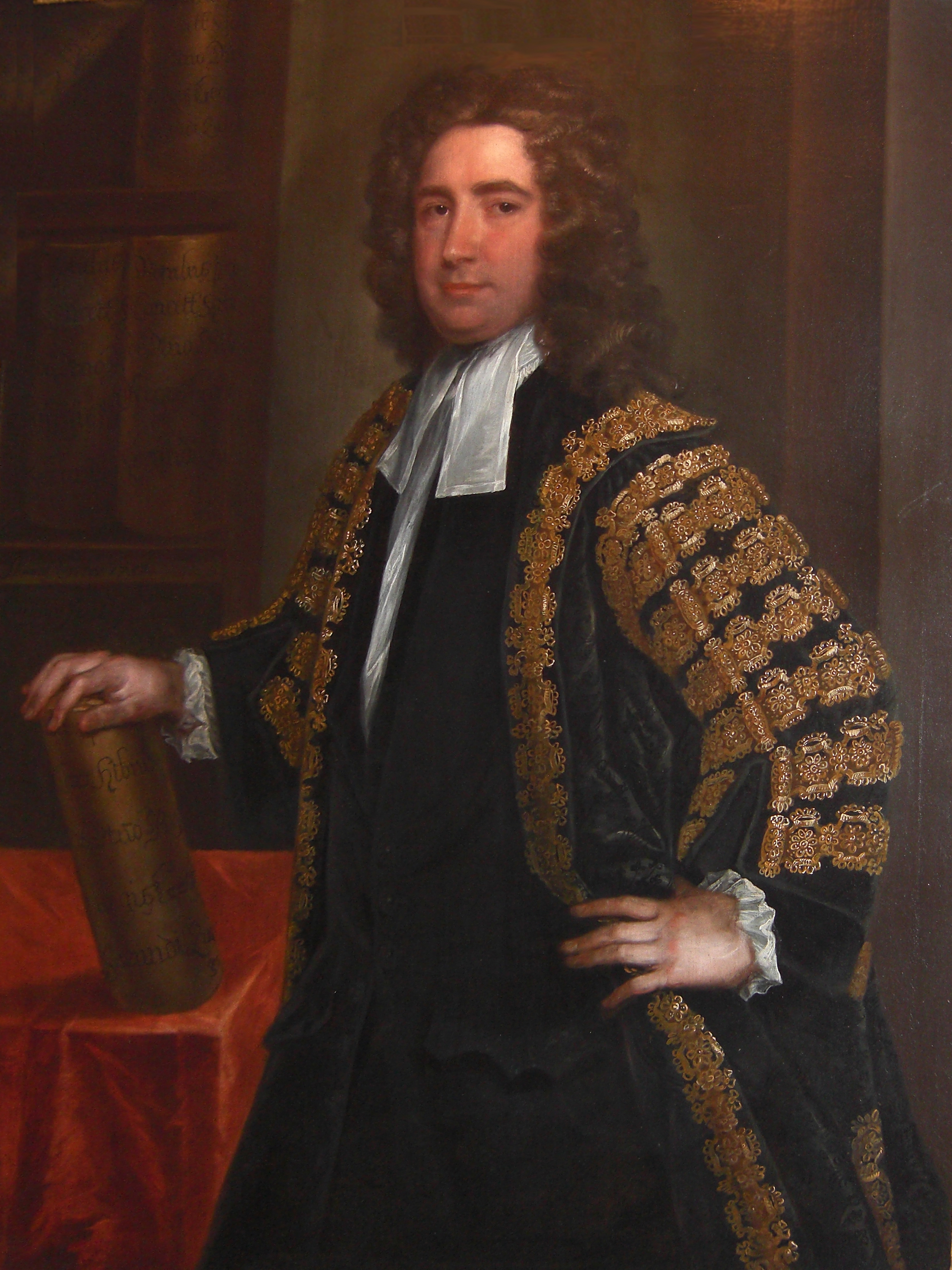
Thomas Carter (c. 1727)

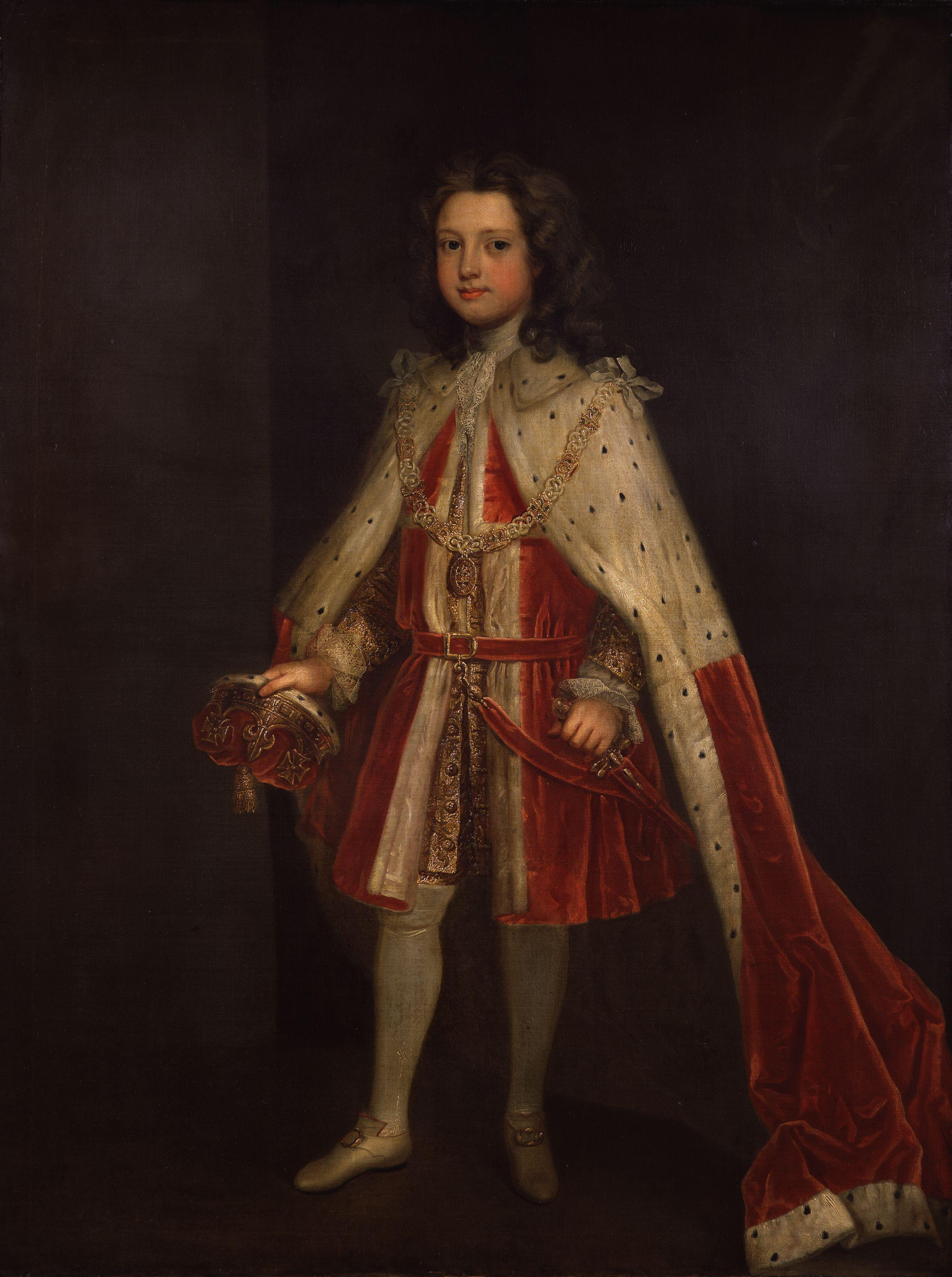
William Augustus, Duke of Cumberland (c. 1728)

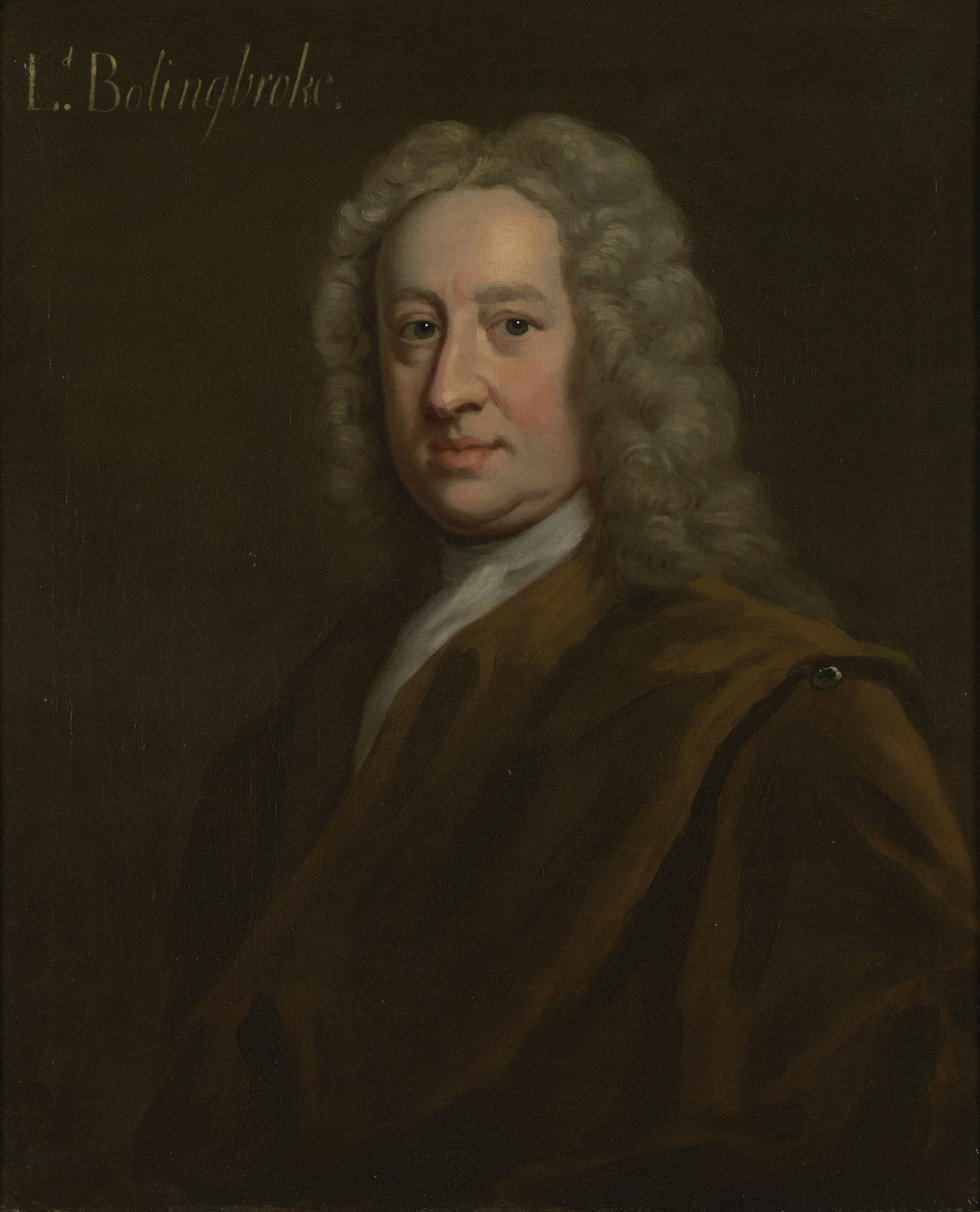
Henry St John, 1st Viscount Bolingbroke (c. 1735)

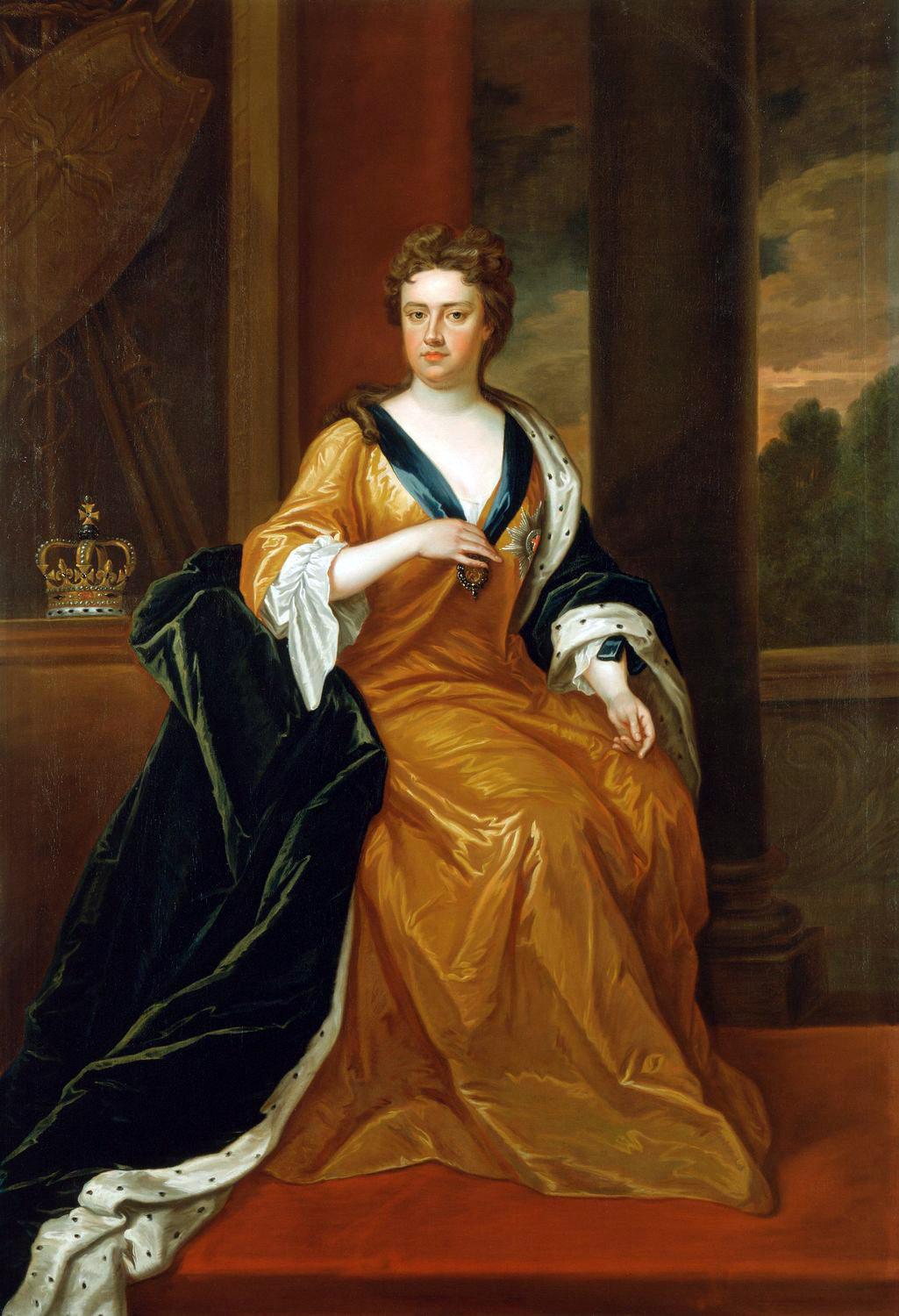
Queen Anne (1736)

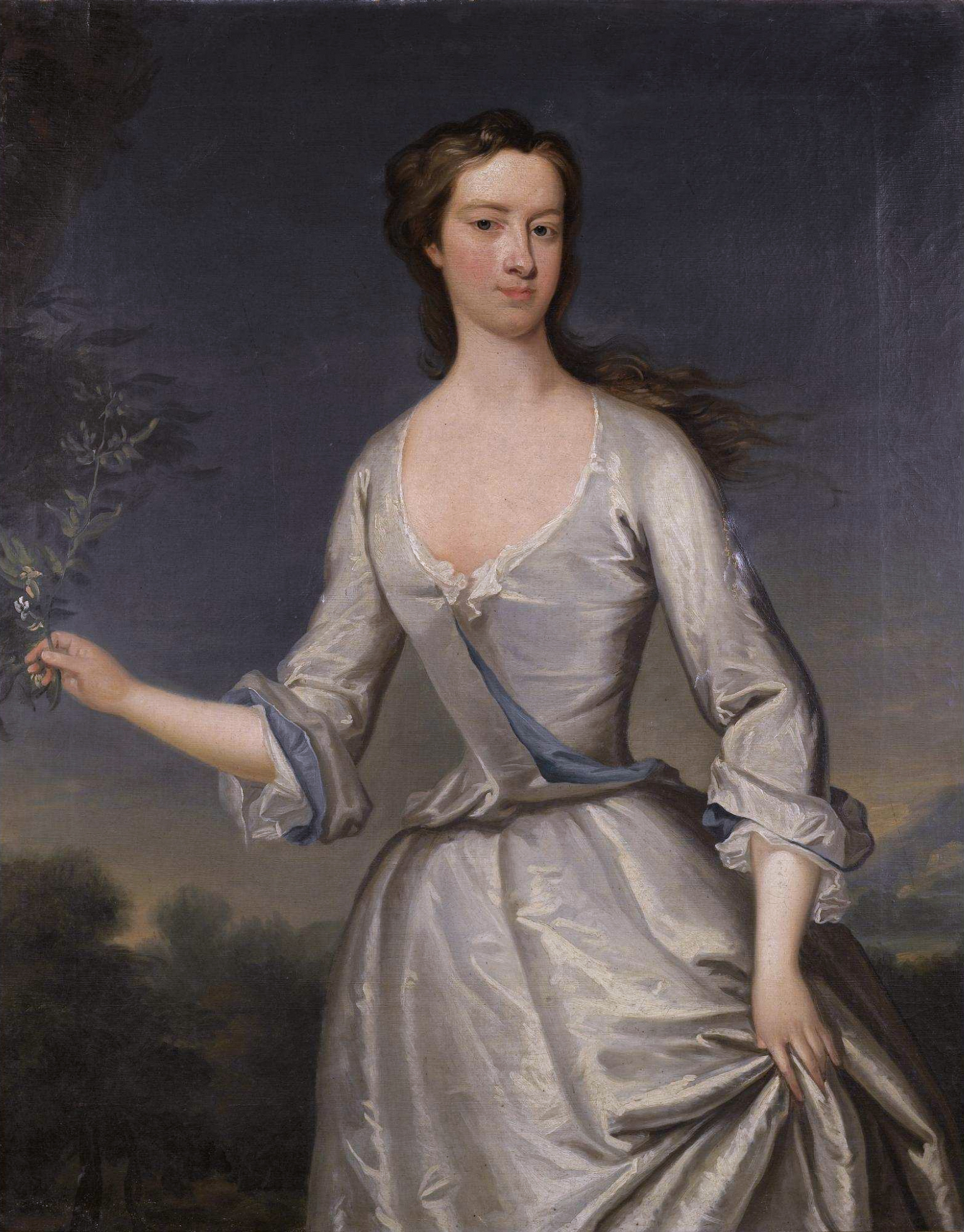
Portrait of Harriet Pelham-Holles, Duchess of Newcastle-upon-Tyne
