= Phil Lloyd =

Phil Lloyd is the name of:

- Phil Lloyd (actor), Australian actor
- Phil Lloyd (footballer), English footballer

== See also ==
- Philip Lloyd, British Army officer and politician
- Philip Lloyd (priest), Anglican priest
