= Charles Townshend, 2nd Viscount Townshend =

British statesman (1674–1738)

The Right Honourable The Viscount Townshend KG PC FRS
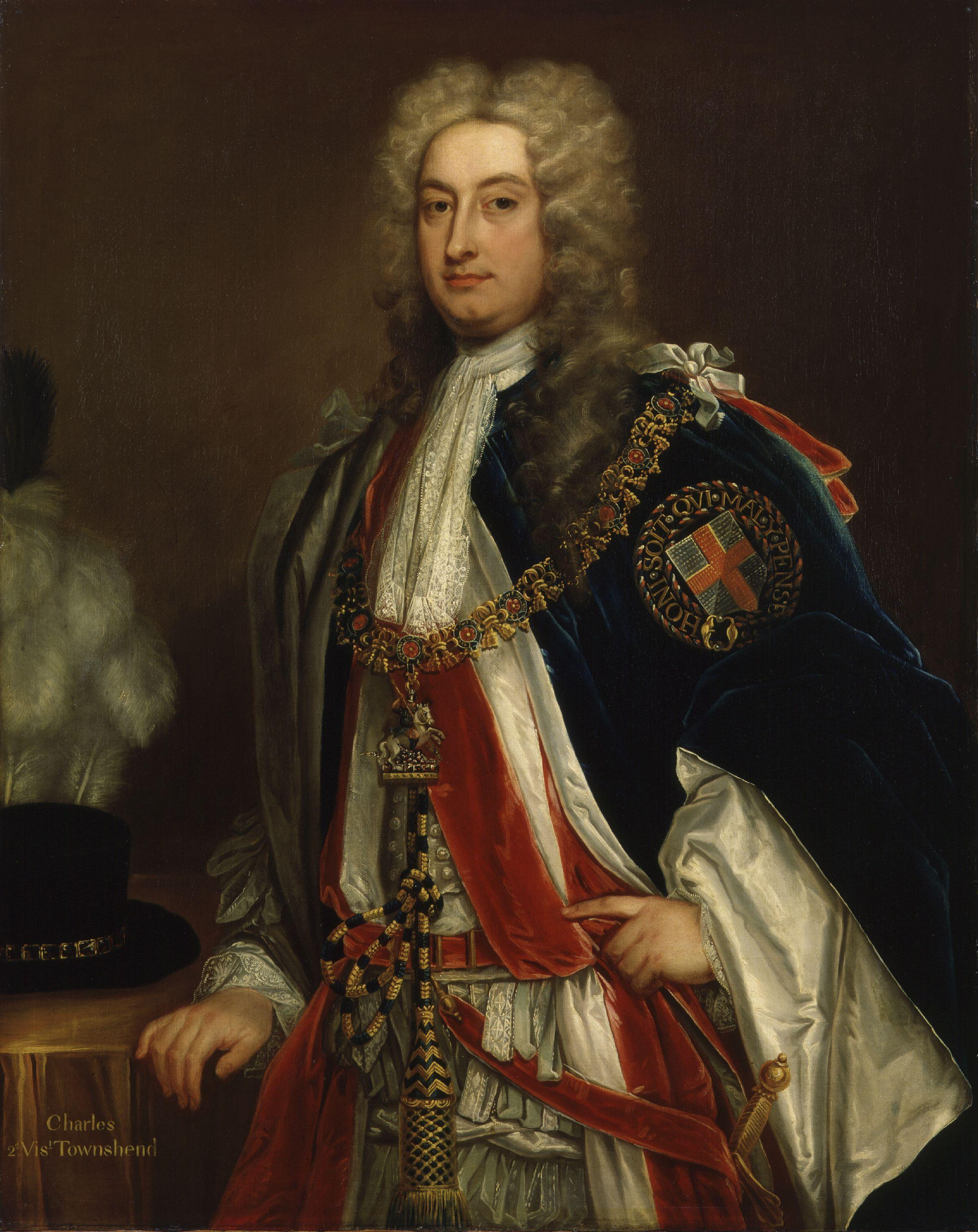
- Portrait attributed to Charles Jervas, c. 1724

Secretary of State for the Northern Department
- In office 10 February 1721 – 16 May 1730
- Monarch: George I
- Prime Minister: Robert Walpole
- Preceded by: The Earl Stanhope
- Succeeded by: The Lord Harrington
- In office 17 September 1714 – 12 December 1716
- Monarch: George I
- Preceded by: William Bromley
- Succeeded by: James Stanhope

Lord President of the Council
- In office 11 June 1720 – 25 June 1721
- Monarch: George I
- Preceded by: The Duke of Kingston-upon-Hull
- Succeeded by: The Lord Carleton

Lord Lieutenant of Ireland
- In office 13 February 1717 – 9 April 1717
- Monarch: George I
- Preceded by: Lords Justices
- Succeeded by: The Duke of Bolton

Captain of the Yeomen of the Guard
- In office 14 November 1707 – 13 June 1711
- Monarch: Anne
- Preceded by: Marquess of Hartington
- Succeeded by: Henry Paget

Personal details
- Born: 18 April 1674 Raynham Hall, Norfolk
- Died: 21 June 1738 (aged 64) Raynham Hall, Norfolk
- Spouse(s): Elizabeth Pelham; Dorothy Walpole
- Children: 12, including Charles, Thomas, William, Roger, George, and Edward
- Parent: Horatio Townshend (father)
- Education: King's College, Cambridge; Eton College

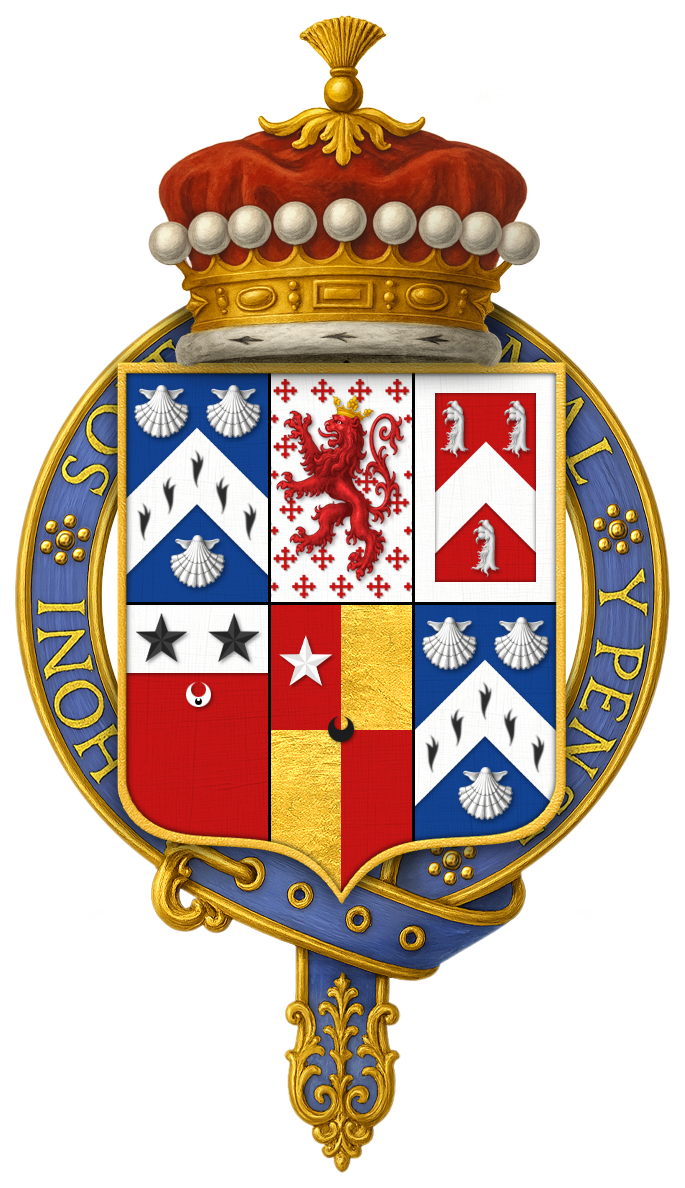
Quartered arms of Charles Townshend, 2nd Viscount Townshend

Charles Townshend, 2nd Viscount Townshend, KG PC FRS(/ˈtaʊnzənd/; 18 April 1674 – 21 June 1738) was a British Whig statesman. From 1714 to 1717, and again from 1721 to 1730, he served as Secretary of State for the Northern Department. He directed British foreign policy in close collaboration with his brother-in-law, prime minister Robert Walpole. He was often known as Turnip Townshend because of his strong interest in farming field turnips and his role in the British Agricultural Revolution.

== Early life ==
Townshend was the eldest son of Sir Horatio Townshend, 3rd Baronet, who was created Baron Townshend in 1661 and Viscount Townshend in 1682. The old Norfolk family of Townshend, to which he belonged, is descended from Sir Roger Townshend (d. 1493) of Raynham, who acted as legal advisor to the Paston family, and was made a justice of the common pleas in 1484. His descendant, another Sir Roger Townshend (c. 1543–1590), had a son Sir John Townshend (1564–1603), a soldier, whose son, Sir Roger Townshend (1588– 1637), was created a baronet in 1617. He was the father of Sir Horatio Townshend.

Born at Raynham Hall, Norfolk, Townshend succeeded to the peerages in December 1687, and was educated at Eton College and King's College, Cambridge. He had Tory sympathies when he took his seat in the House of Lords, but his views changed, and he began to take an active part in politics as a Whig. For a few years after the accession of Queen Anne he remained without office, but in November 1708 he was appointed Captain of the Yeomen of the Guard, having in the previous year been summoned to the Privy Council. He was ambassador extraordinary and plenipotentiary to the Dutch States-General from 1709 to 1711, taking part during these years in the negotiations which preceded the conclusion of the Treaty of Utrecht.

He was elected a Fellow of the Royal Society in April 1706.

== Secretary of State and other posts ==
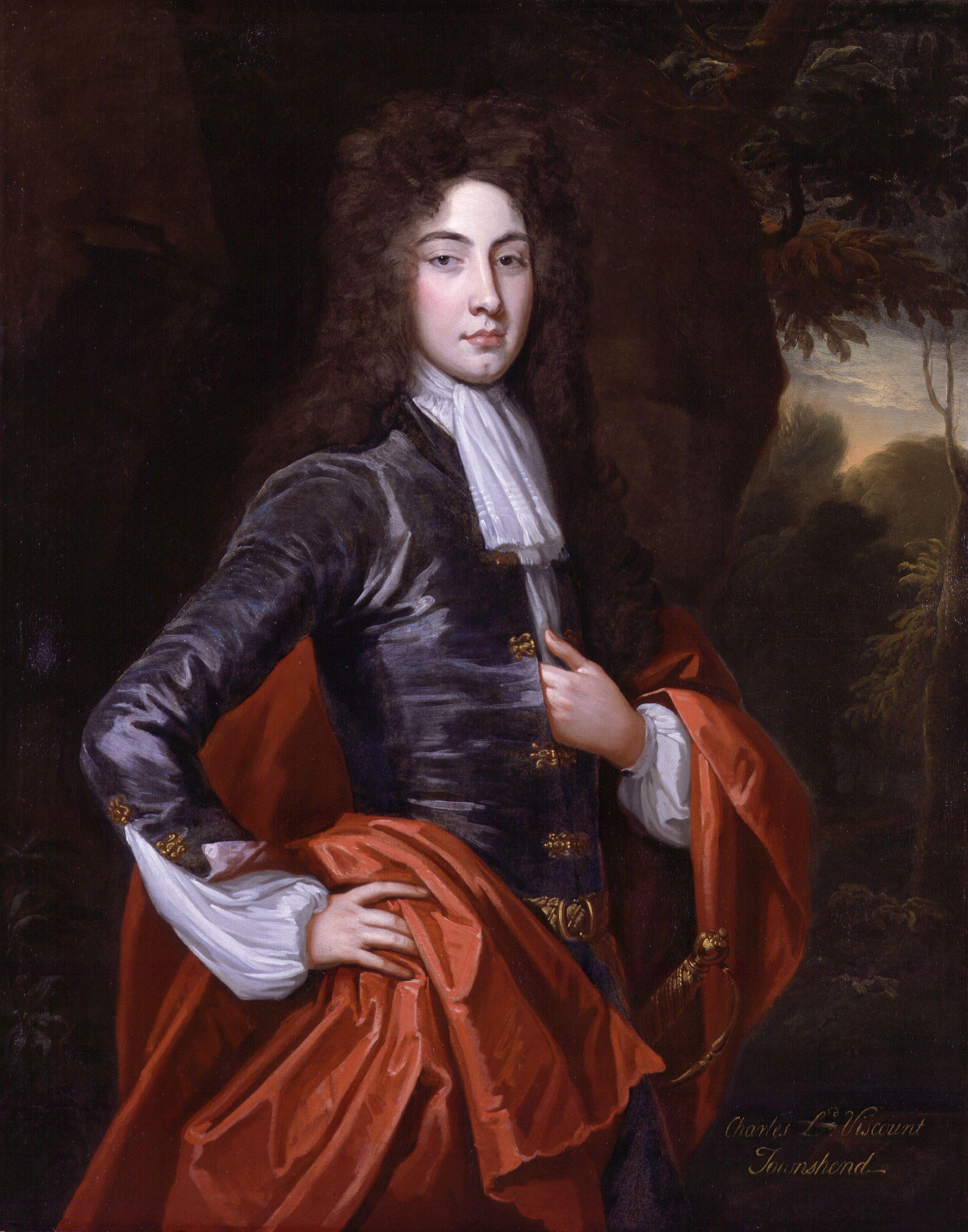
Charles Viscount Townshend, studio of Kneller. National Portrait Gallery NPG 1363. Probably painted soon after Townshend entered the House of Lords in 1697, but he does not wear his official robes. This is typical of the Kit-Cat Club portraits, which emphasise the like-mindedness and unity of the members rather than their different social positions

After his recall to England, he was busily occupied in attacking the proceedings of the new Tory ministry. Townshend quickly won the favour of George I, and in September 1714, the new king selected him as Secretary of State for the Northern Department. The policy of Townshend and his colleagues, after they had suppressed the Jacobite rising of 1715, both at home and abroad, was one of peace. Townshend was opposed to British involvement in the Great Northern War, and he promoted the conclusion of defensive alliances between Britain, Austria and France.

In spite of these successes, the influence of the Whigs was gradually undermined by the intrigues of Charles Spencer, 3rd Earl of Sunderland, and by the discontent of the Hanoverian favourites. In October 1716, Townshend's colleague, James Stanhope afterwards 1st Earl Stanhope, accompanied the king on his visit to Hanover, and while there he was seduced from his allegiance to his fellow ministers by Sunderland, George being led to believe that Townshend and his brother-in-law, Sir Robert Walpole, were caballing with the Prince of Wales, their intention being that the prince should supplant his father on the throne. Consequently, in December 1716 Townshend was dismissed from office and made Lord Lieutenant of Ireland, but he only retained this post until the following April. When he was dismissed for voting against the government, he was joined by his brother-in-law Robert Walpole and other Whig Allies. This began the Whig Split which would divide the dominant party until 1720, with the opposition Whigs joining with the Tories to defeat Stanhope's government over several issues including the Peerage Bill of 1719.

Early in 1720 a partial reconciliation took place between the parties of Stanhope and Townshend, and in June of this year the latter became Lord President of the Council, a post which he held until February 1721, when, after the death of Stanhope and the forced retirement of Sunderland, a result of the South Sea Bubble, he was again appointed Secretary of State for the northern department, with Walpole as First Lord of the Treasury and Chancellor of the Exchequer. The two remained in power during the remainder of the reign of George I the chief domestic events of the time being the impeachment of Bishop Atterbury, the pardon and partial restoration of Lord Bolingbroke, and the troubles in Ireland caused by the patent permitting Wood to coin halfpence.

During his tenure as Secretary of State for the Northern Department, Anglo-Dutch relations improved. During the War of the Spanish Succession, the Tory Harley ministry had concluded a separate peace treaty with France without consulting their Dutch allies, causing considerable anger. The Dutch States General saw the Whig Townshend ministry, including Townshend himself, as better diplomatic partners, and the Dutch sent several thousand troops to Britain to assist in the suppression of the Jacobite rising of 1715. Townshend had previously served as Britain's ambassador to the Dutch Republic, and was described by one British commentator as someone whose "predominant passion was love of the Dutch".

Townshend secured the dismissal of his rival, Lord Carteret, afterwards Earl Granville, but soon differences arose between himself and Walpole, and he had some difficulty in steering a course through the troubled sea of European politics. Although disliking him, George II retained him in office, but the predominance in the ministry passed gradually but surely from him to Walpole. Townshend could not brook this. So long, to use Walpole's witty remark, as the firm was Townshend and Walpole all went well with it, but when the positions were reversed jealousies arose between the partners. Serious differences of opinion concerning the policy to be adopted towards Austria and in foreign politics generally led to a final rupture in 1730. Failing, owing to Walpole's interference, in his efforts to procure the dismissal of a colleague and his replacement by a personal friend, Townshend retired on 15 May 1730. His departure removed the final obstacle to the conclusion of an Anglo-Austrian Alliance which would become the centrepiece of British foreign policy until 1756.

According to historians Linda Frey and Marsha Frey:

Townshend was undoubtedly capable, determined, and hard-working, but in achieving his goals he sometimes appeared blunt, abrasive, stubborn, impatient, and overbearing. In contrast to many of his contemporaries whose venality was legendary he was scrupulously honest. He was generous to both friend and foe. He was also a passionate man who loved and hated quickly and rarely changed his mind once an opinion had been formed....Historians have often underrated Townshend's accomplishments in part because his rival Walpole outmanoeuvred and outlasted him.

== "Turnip" Townshend ==
His remaining years were passed at Raynham, where he interested himself in agriculture. He promoted the adoption of the Norfolk four-course system, involving the rotation of turnips, barley, clover, and wheat crops. He was an enthusiastic advocate of growing turnips as a field crop for livestock feed. As a result of his promotion of turnip-growing and his agricultural experiments at Raynham, he became known as "Turnip Townshend". (Alexander Pope mentions "Townshend's turnips" in Imitations of Horace, Epistle II.) Townshend is often mentioned, together with Jethro Tull, Robert Bakewell, and others, as a major figure in England's "Agricultural Revolution", contributing to the adoption of agricultural practices that led to the increase in Britain's population between 1700 and 1850.

He died at Raynham on 21 June 1738.

== Family ==
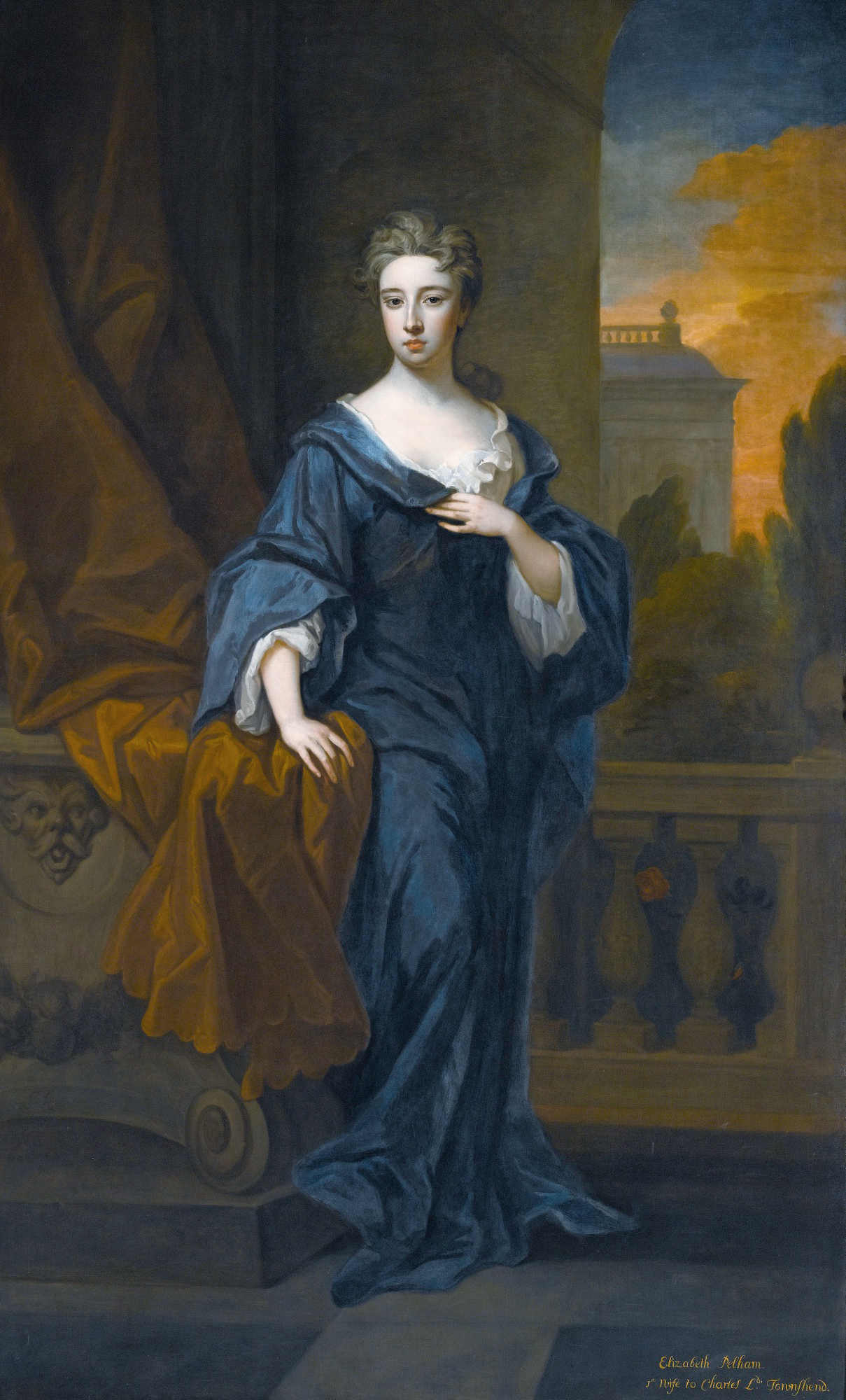
Elizabeth Pelham, first wife of Charles, painted by Godfrey Kneller (late 1690s)

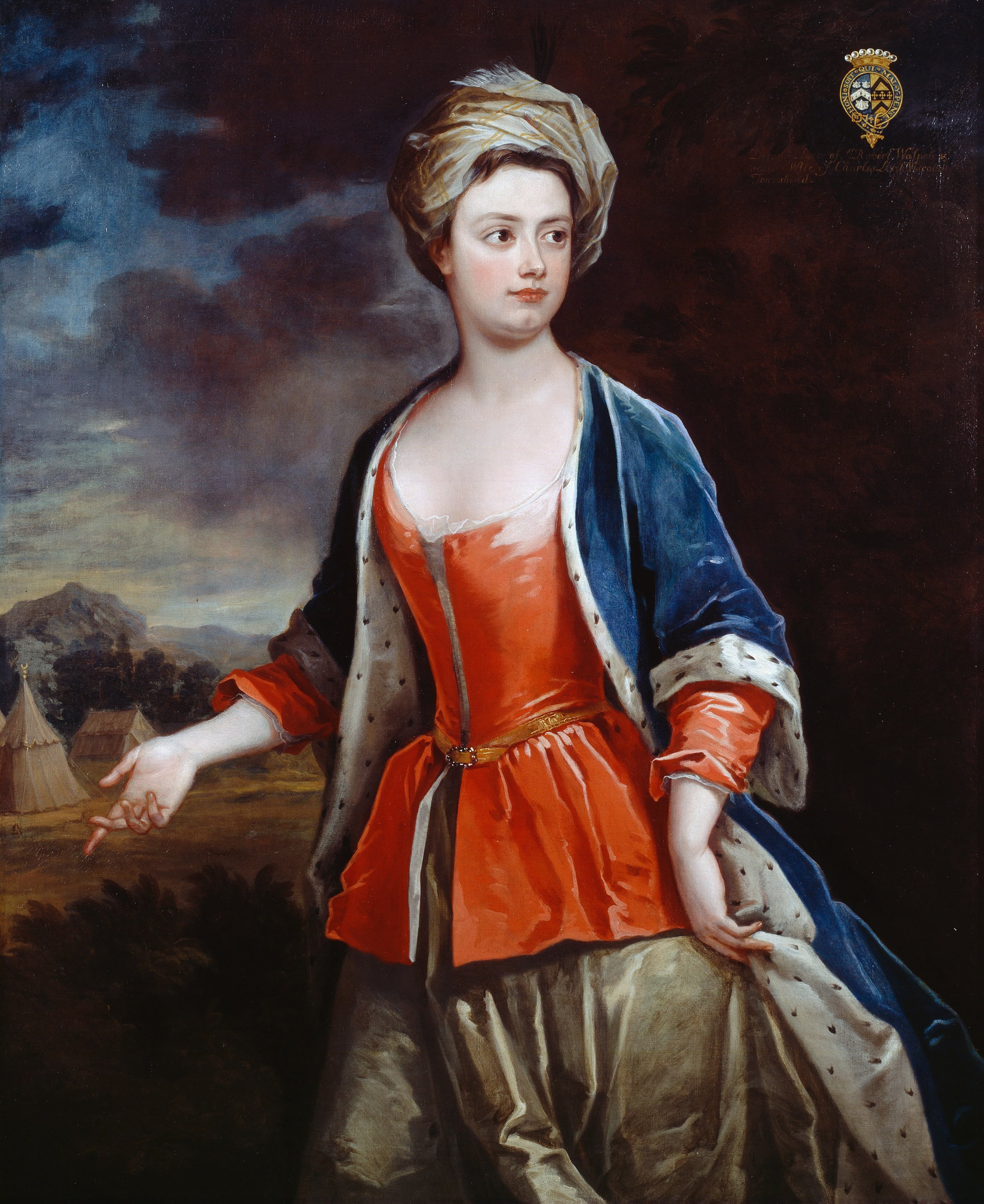
Dorothy Walpole, second wife of Charles, by Charles Jervas

Townshend was twice married—first to the Hon. Elizabeth Pelham (1681–1711), daughter of Thomas Pelham, 1st Baron Pelham of Laughton and his first wife Elizabeth, daughter of Sir William Jones of Ramsbury Manor, Attorney General for England and Wales.

Children with the Hon. Elizabeth Pelham:

- Charles Townshend, 3rd Viscount Townshend of Raynham b. 11 July 1700, d. 12 March 1764
- Hon. Thomas Townshend b. 2 June 1701, d. 21 May 1780
- Hon. William Townshend b. 9 June 1702, d. 29 January 1738
- Hon. Elizabeth Townshend (bap. 28 July 1703-1 December 1785) married Charles Cornwallis, 1st Earl Cornwallis on 28 November 1722. They were the parents of General Cornwallis, who commanded the British forces in the American Revolution.
- Hon Roger Townshend bap. 16 April 1705, bur. 3 February 1706
- Hon. Roger Townshend b. 15 June 1708, d. 7 August 1760
- Henry Townshend (bap. 5 June 1709- )

Secondly, he married (6 July 1713) Dorothy Walpole (1686–1726), sister of Sir Robert Walpole. She is said to haunt Raynham as the Brown Lady of Raynham Hall.

Children with Dorothy Walpole:

- Hon. Dorothy Townshend b. 5 May 1714, married Spencer Cowper (later Dean of Durham) on 12 May 1743, d. 19 May 1779
- Hon. George Townshend b. 29 October 1715 d. Aug 1769
- Hon. Augustus Townshend b. 5 October 1716 d. 1746.
- Hon. Horatio Townshend b. 20 September 1717 d. 1764
- Hon. Robert Townshend b. 15 October 1718, bur. 18 January 1719
- Very Rev. The Hon. Edward Townshend b. 25 October 1719, d. 27 January 1765, Dean of Norwich (1761–1765), Canon of Westminster (1749–1761)
- Hon. Mary Townshend (d. 29 December 1776) married (17 March 1763.) Lieutenant General Edward Cornwallis (5 Mar 1724 – 14 Jan 1776), son of Charles Cornwallis, 4th Baron Cornwallis of Eye and Lady Charlotte Butler, without issue.
- Hon. Richard Townshend b. 8 September 1721 bur. 12 November 1721.
- Hon. Henrietta Townshend bap. 28 April 1723, bur. 27 October 1723

He had nine sons, one of them died at a young age. The eldest son, Charles, the 3rd viscount (1700–1764), was called to the House of Lords in 1723. The second son, Thomas Townshend (1701–1780), was member of parliament for the University of Cambridge from 1727 to 1774; his only son, Thomas Townshend (1733–1800), who was created Baron Sydney in 1783 and Viscount Sydney in 1789, was a secretary of state and Leader of the House of Commons from July 1782 to April 1783, and from December 1783 to June 1789 again a secretary of state, Sydney in New South Wales being named after him; his grandson, John Robert Townshend (1805–1890), the 3rd viscount, was created Earl Sydney in 1874, the titles becoming extinct at his death. Charles Townshend's eldest son by his second wife was George Townshend (1715–1769), who after serving for many years in the navy, became an admiral in 1765. The younger son Edward (1719–1765) became Dean of Norwich

The third viscount had two sons, George, 1st Marquess Townshend, and Charles Townshend.

Townsend was the maternal grandfather of Charles Cornwallis, 1st Marquess Cornwallis.

== Ancestry ==
Ancestors of Charles Townshend, 2nd Viscount Townshend

8. Sir John Townshend
4. Sir Roger Townshend, 1st Baronet
9. Anne Bacon
2. Horatio Townshend, 1st Viscount Townshend
10. Horace Vere, 1st Baron Vere of Tilbury
5. Mary Vere
11. Mary Tracy
1. Charles Townshend, 2nd Viscount Townshend
12. James Ashe
6. Sir Joseph Ashe, 1st Baronet
13. Grace Pitt
3. Mary Ashe
14. Robert Wilson
7. Mary Wilson
15. Katherine Rudd

== See also ==
- Kingdom of Great Britain#George I: 1714–1727

== Sources ==
- Rigg, James McMullen (1899). "Townshend, Charles (1674–1738)" . In Lee, Sidney (ed.). Dictionary of National Biography. Vol. 57. London: Smith, Elder & Co.
- Frey, Linda. "Townshend, Charles, second Viscount Townshend (1674–1738)". Oxford Dictionary of National Biography (online ed.). Oxford University Press. doi:10.1093/ref:odnb/27617. (Subscription, Wikipedia Library access or UK public library membership required.)
- Dunthorne, Hugh (2015). Flanders and Holland in the Eighteenth Century (PDF).

Diplomatic posts
Preceded by William Cadogan	British Ambassador to the Netherlands; 1709–1711	Succeeded by Thomas Wentworth, 1st Earl of Strafford
Political offices
Preceded by Marquess of Hartington	Captain of the Yeomen of the Guard; 1707–1714	Succeeded by The Lord Paget
Preceded by William Bromley	Northern Secretary; 1714–1716	Succeeded by James Stanhope
Preceded by The Earl of Sunderland	Lord Lieutenant of Ireland; 1717	Succeeded by The Duke of Bolton
Preceded by The Duke of Kingston-upon-Hull	Lord President of the Council; 1720–1721	Succeeded by The Lord Carleton
Preceded by The Earl Stanhope	Northern Secretary; 1721–1730	Succeeded by The Lord Harrington
Honorary titles
Preceded by The Duke of Norfolk	Lord Lieutenant of Norfolk; 1701–1713	Succeeded by The Duke of Ormonde
Preceded by The Duke of Ormonde	Lord Lieutenant of Norfolk; 1714–1730	Succeeded by Lord Lynn
Peerage of England
Preceded by Horatio Townshend	Viscount Townshend; 1st creation 1687–1738	Succeeded by Charles Townshend
Preceded by Horatio Townshend	Baron Townshend (descended by acceleration); 1st creation 1687–1723	Succeeded by Charles Townshend
