= Raynham Hall =

Grade I listed English country house in North Norfolk, England

Coordinates: 52.7965°N 0.7902°E

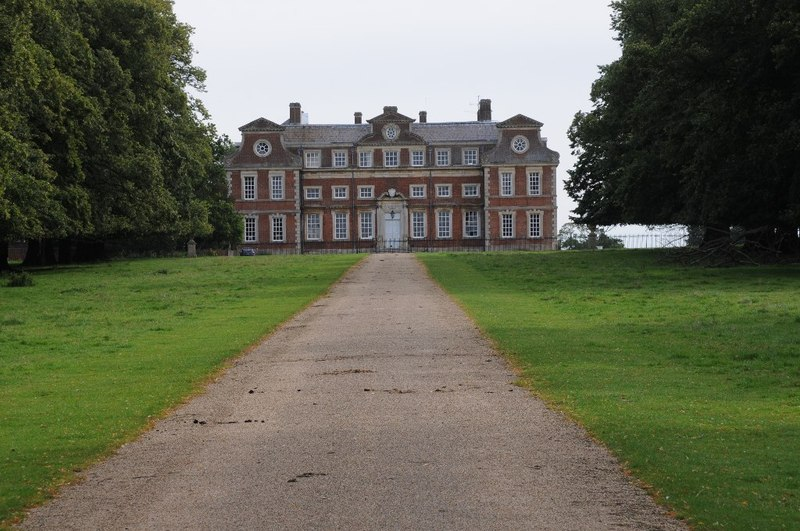
- Raynham Hall in 2015

General information
- Type: Country house
- Location: Norfolk, England
- Construction started: 17th century
- Owner: Thomas Townshend, 9th Marquess Townshend

Website
- Official website

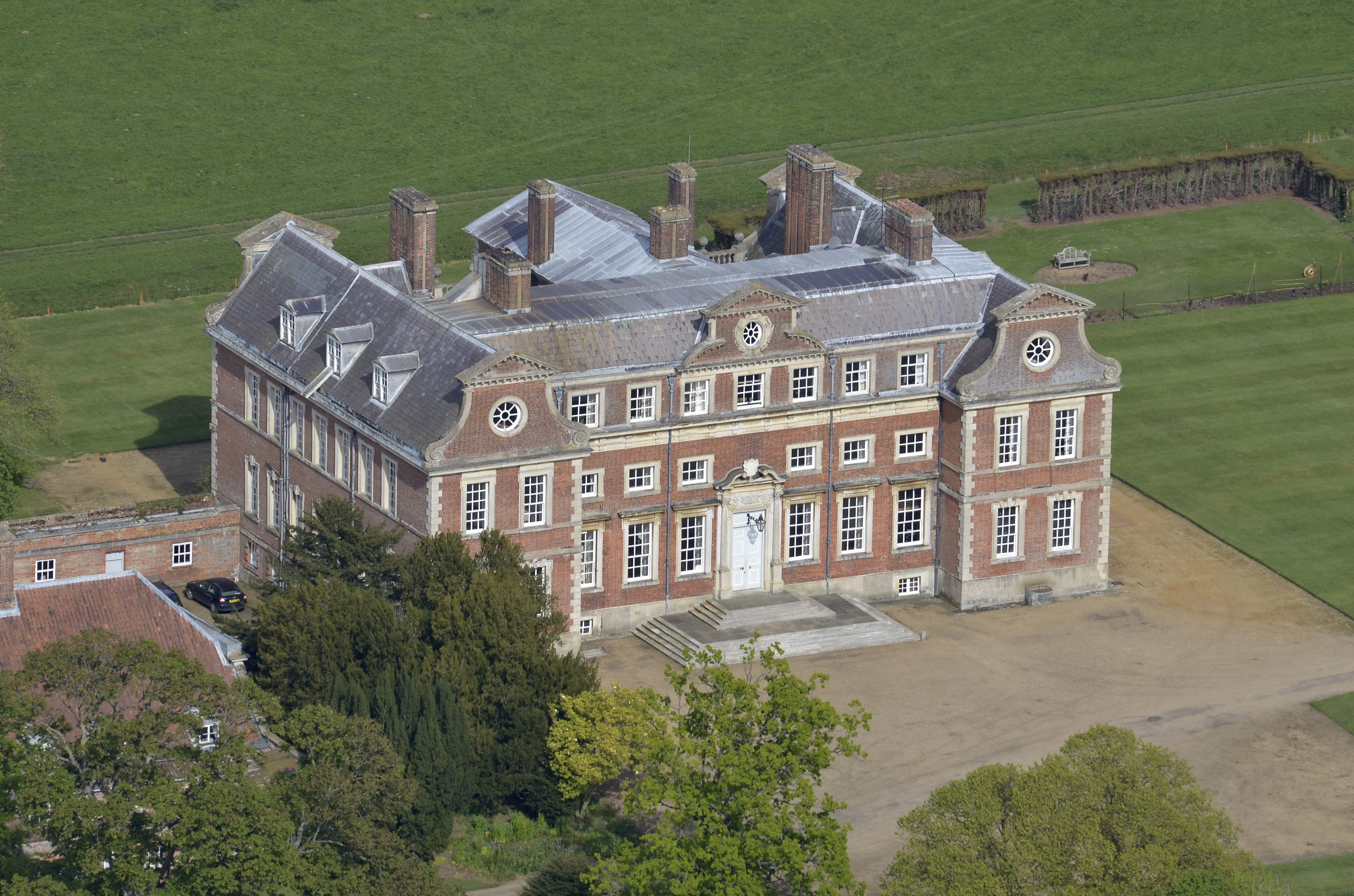
Aerial view of Raynham Hall

Raynham Hall is an English country house in Norfolk, England. For nearly 400 years, it has been the seat of the Townshend family. The hall gave its name to the five estate villages, known as The Raynhams. It is reported to be haunted, providing the scene for possibly the most famous ghost photo of all time, the famous Brown Lady descending the staircase. However, the ghost has been allegedly seen infrequently since the photo was taken. Its most famous resident was Charles Townshend, 2nd Viscount Townshend (1674–1738), leader in the House of Lords.

== Architecture ==
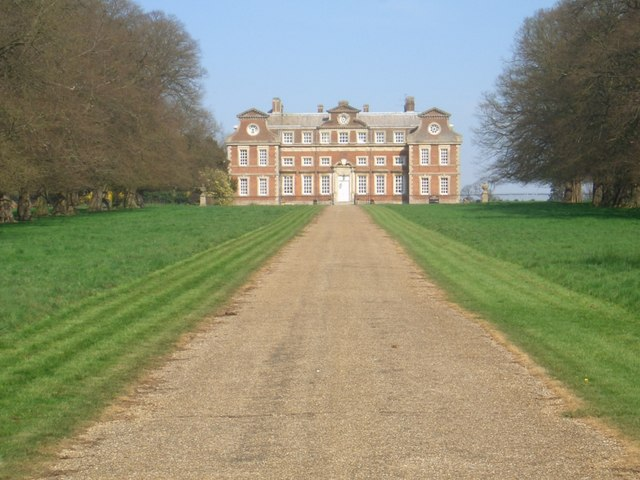
Raynham Hall: the Southwest Front and the entrance avenue

Raynham Hall is one of the most splendid of the great houses of Norfolk. After a false start in 1619 and the accumulation on site of a large quantity of Ketton stone in 1621, construction was begun in 1622. By the time of Sir Roger Townshend's death in 1637, it was substantially complete, though apparently some rooms had not been fitted out, for when the architect Sir Roger Pratt saw it a few years after Townshend's death, he recalled later

Not long after it was built... I was some while in it, while it had no ornament at all... There was somewhat in it divine in the symmetry of proportions of length, height and breadth which was harmonious to the rational soul.

Whether or not Raynham Hall was "the first of its kind in England" (as the genealogist G. E. Cokayne averred), it was certainly "one of the outstanding country houses of the period." Perhaps because of the three-year grand tour of Europe which Sir Roger had undertaken, accompanied by his mason, William Edge of Raynham, whom he paid in 1620 for twenty-eight weeks accompanying him "in England and out of England", Raynham was built in an entirely new style, abandoning native tradition and following the Italian form and plan. Except for its hipped roof and Dutch gables, Raynham could easily be mistaken for a house built nearly a century later.

Raynham's indications that it may have been influenced by Inigo Jones have superseded earlier optimistic attributions to Jones himself: Sir John Summerson summarized his view of its design, "We do not know who designed it, but may infer that Townshend had the assistance of somebody who had worked in proximity to Inigo Jones, possibly at Newmarket." Nicholas Cooper finds it "a medley of up-to-date elements, largely Jonesian and derived from London and probably also from the Prince's Lodging at Newmarket," Howard Colvin finds Raynham "a remarkable epitome of motifs that appear in Jones's earlier drawings... an intelligent reflection of his style rather than a personal work."

== Legend ==
In 1713, Charles Townshend, 2nd Viscount Townshend, married Robert Walpole's prettiest sister, Dorothy. She was his second wife, and is reputed in the gossip of the time to have been previously the mistress of Lord Wharton, "whose character was so infamous, and his lady's complaisant subserviency so notorious, that no young woman could be four and twenty hours under their roof with safety to her reputation." Lady Townshend was buried in 1726. Walpole was Townshend's neighbour in Norfolk as well as his brother-in-law, but political and personal rivalry between them was exacerbated by Walpole's building of Houghton Hall. As Lord Hervey observed, "Lord Townshend looked upon his own seat at Raynham as the metropolis of Norfolk, and considered every stone that augmented the splendour of Houghton, as a diminution of the grandeur of Raynham."

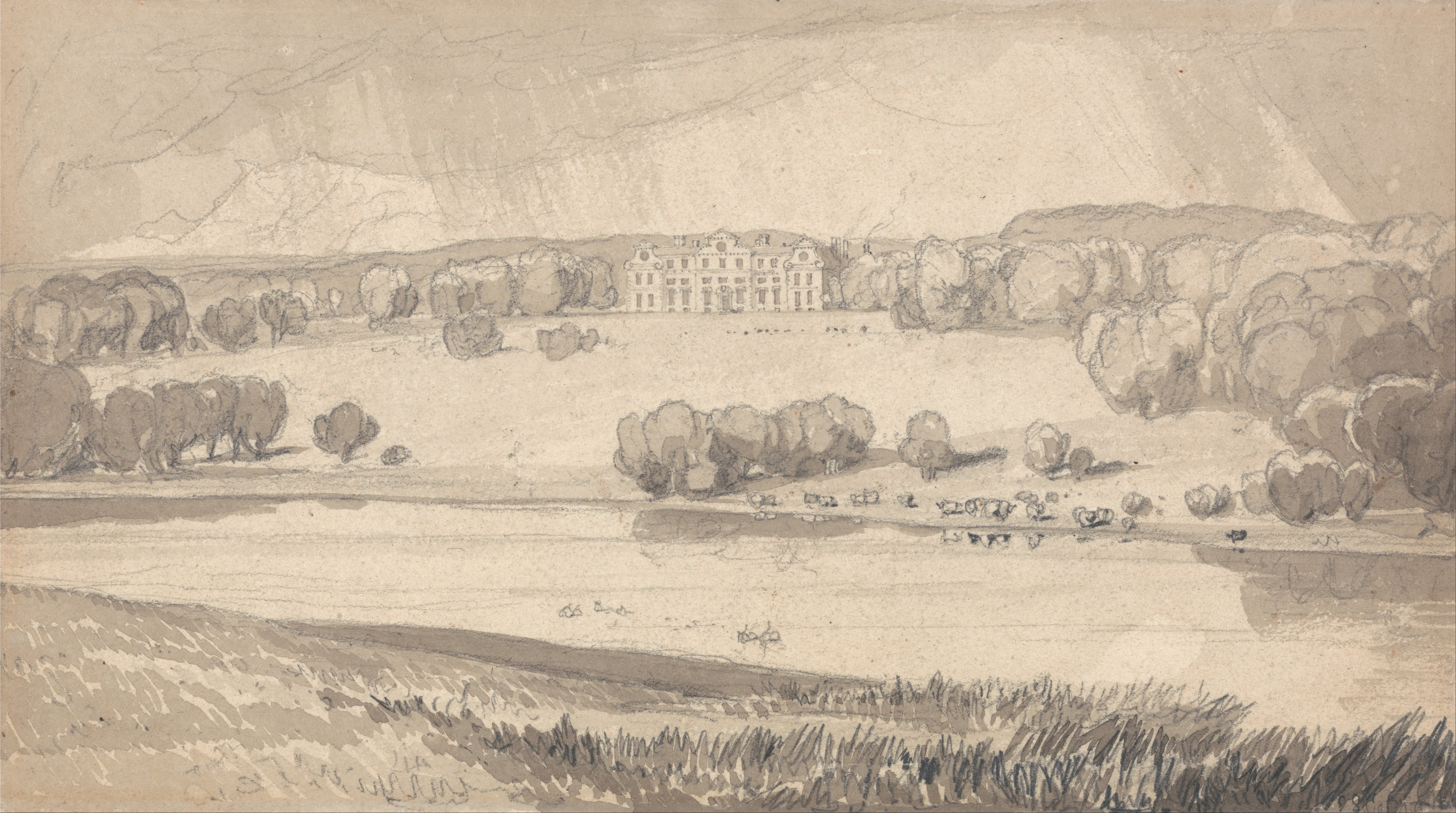
The matured 18th-century landscape, drawn by John Sell Cotman, c. 1818.

== Additions by William Kent ==
Later extensions and interiors were designed for the 2nd Viscount Townshend by William Kent, who brought details of its frontispiece on the North Front more closely in line with the manner of Inigo Jones, whose style formed the pattern for Palladianism in Britain. Working at Raynham from 1725 to 1732, Kent added the north wing to Raynham and decorated the interior, where much of Kent's finest work can be seen, especially in the elaborately carved architectural chimneypieces, the architectural doorcases and the painted staircase imitating niches and sculpture in trompe-l'œil and the painted ceiling imitating mosaic in the 'Belisarius' Room. The impressive and beautiful ceiling of the Marble Hall (completed 1730) with its motif of Lord Townshend's coat-of-arms was sometimes attributed in the 19th century to Inigo Jones himself. In the State Dining Room Kent introduced a screen in the manner of a Roman triumphal arch that particularly irritated Lord Oxford, who saw it in 1732: "the Arch of Severus, surely a most preposterous thing to introduce a building in a room, which was designed to stand in a street."

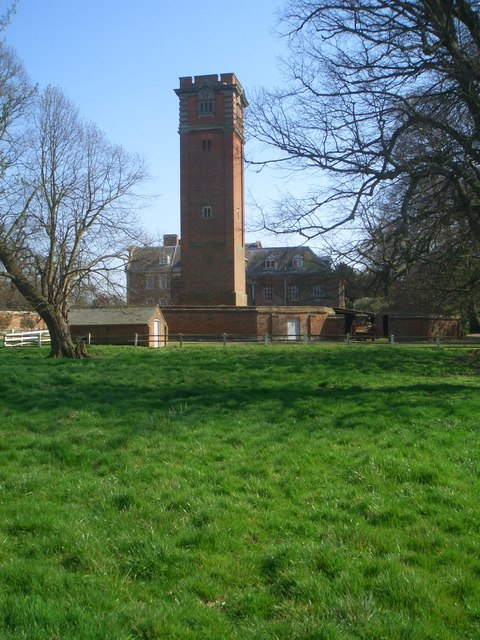
The Water Tower, Raynham

=== Paintings ===
In spite of a series of 20th-century sales, many portraits still adorn Kent's rooms at Raynham. Hanging beside his black and white marble chimney-piece in the Princess' Room is a painting which is believed to be a preliminary sketch for the famous van Dyck portrait "Children of Charles I." Until 1904, there were many more paintings at Raynham, including several family portraits by Kneller and Reynolds. The most famous and valuable was "Belisarius" by Salvator Rosa, which was presented to the 2nd Viscount Townshend by King Frederick William I of Prussia. This was valued at £5,000 in 1804, but was disposed of a hundred years later for £273.

Thomas Townshend, 9th Marquess Townshend, is the present owner of the Hall.

== Gallery ==
Gallery of images of Raynham Hall featured in In English Homes in December 1909:

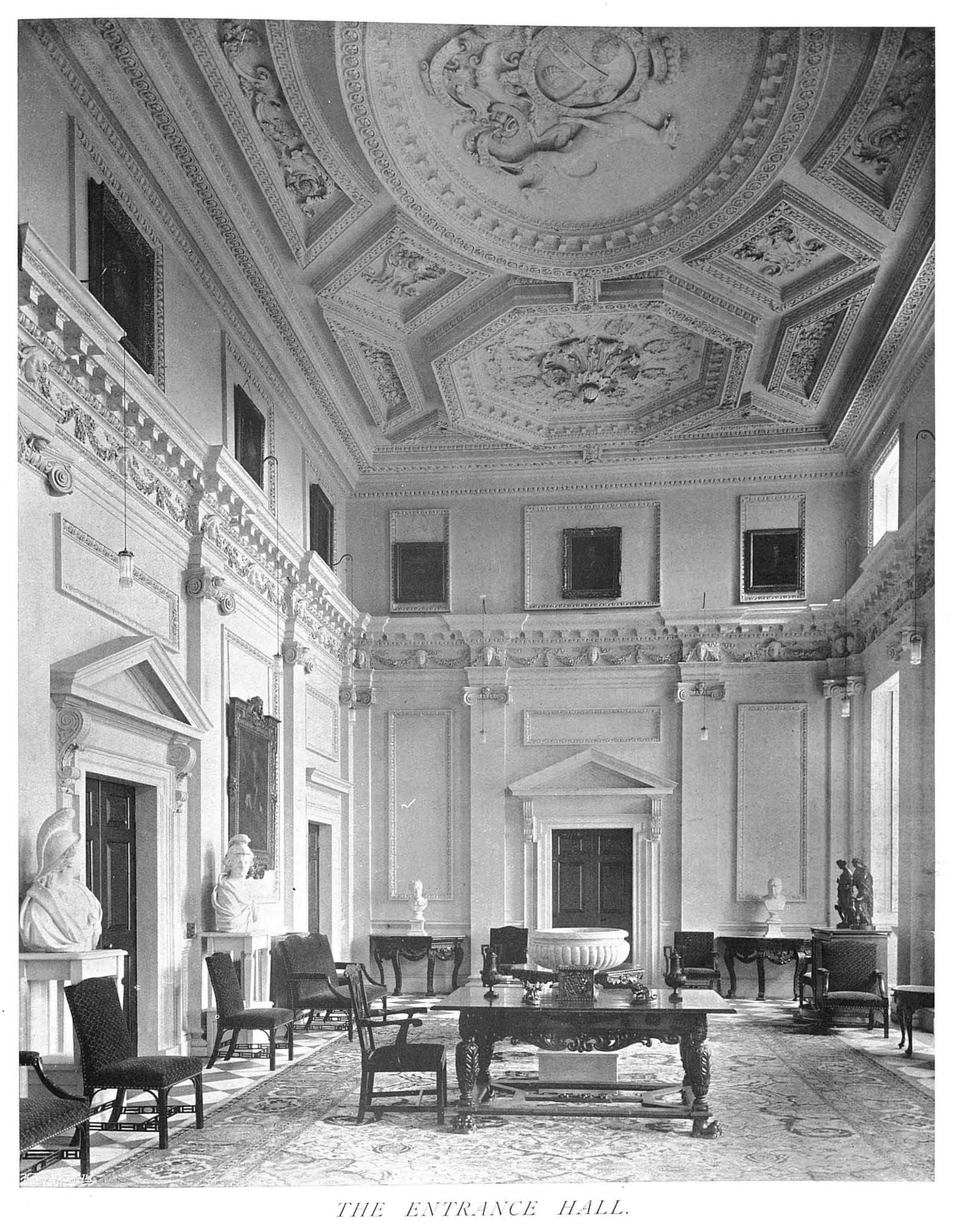
Entrance hall

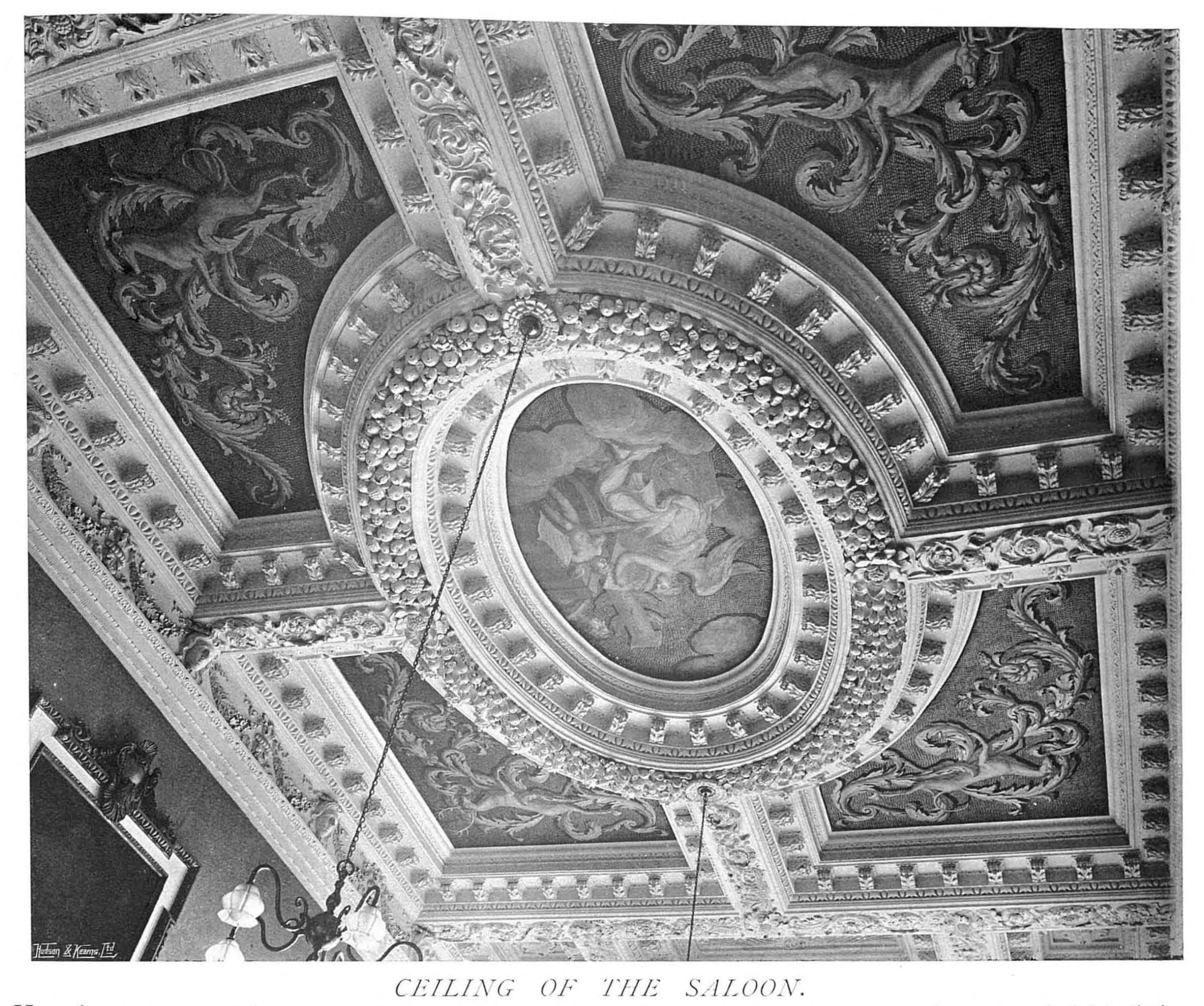
Ceiling of the saloon

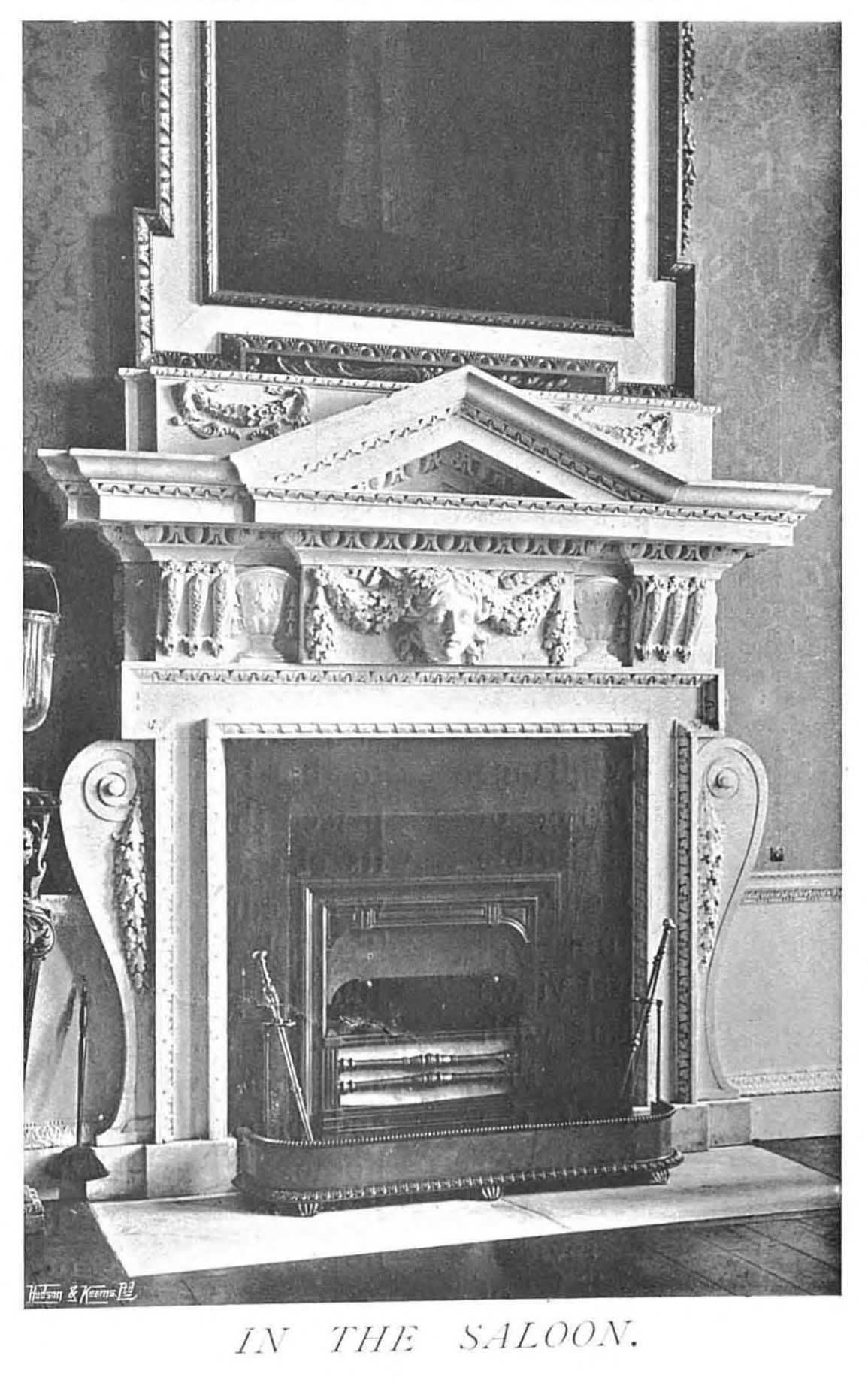
Fireplace in the saloon

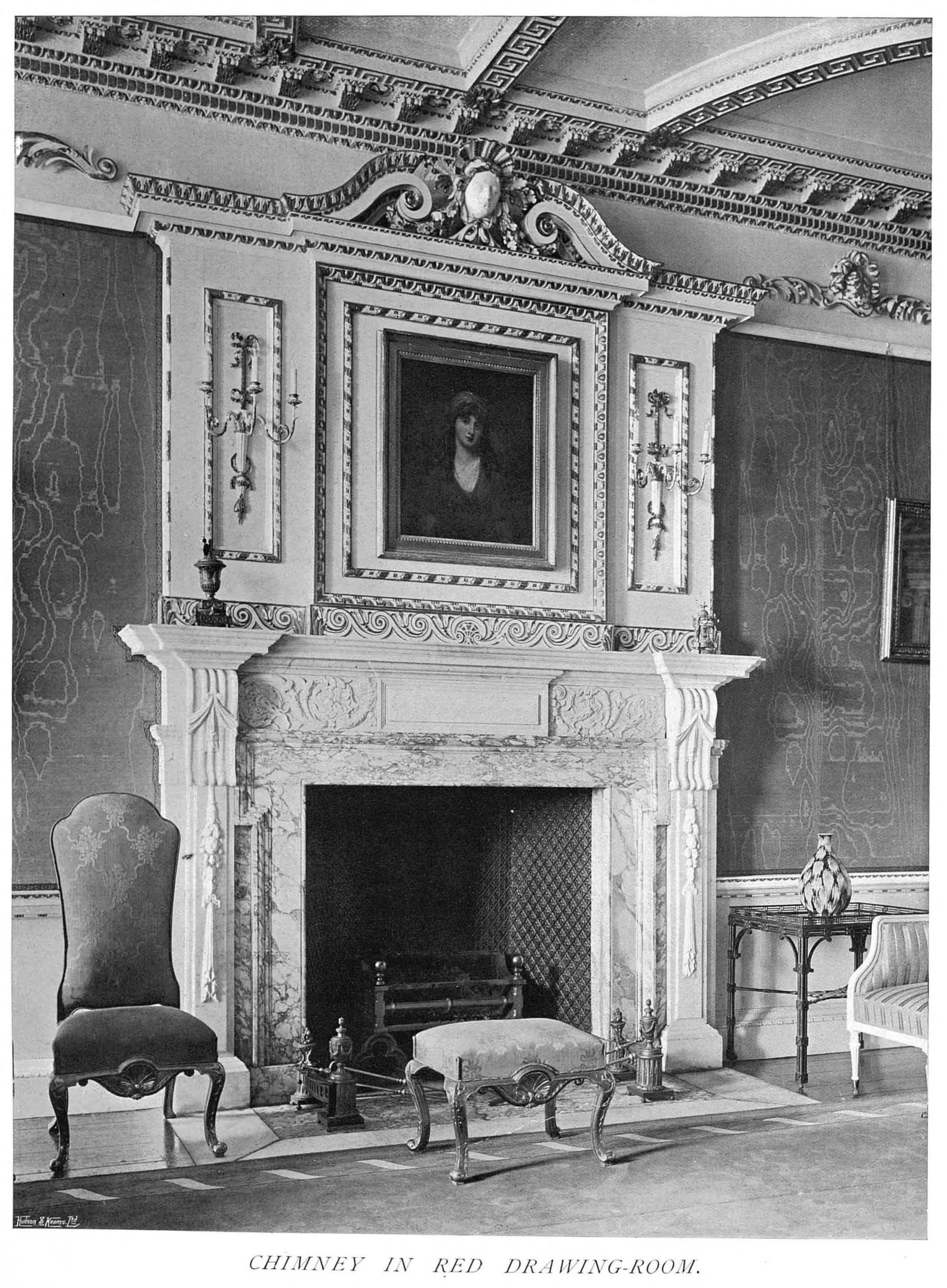
Fireplace in red drawing room

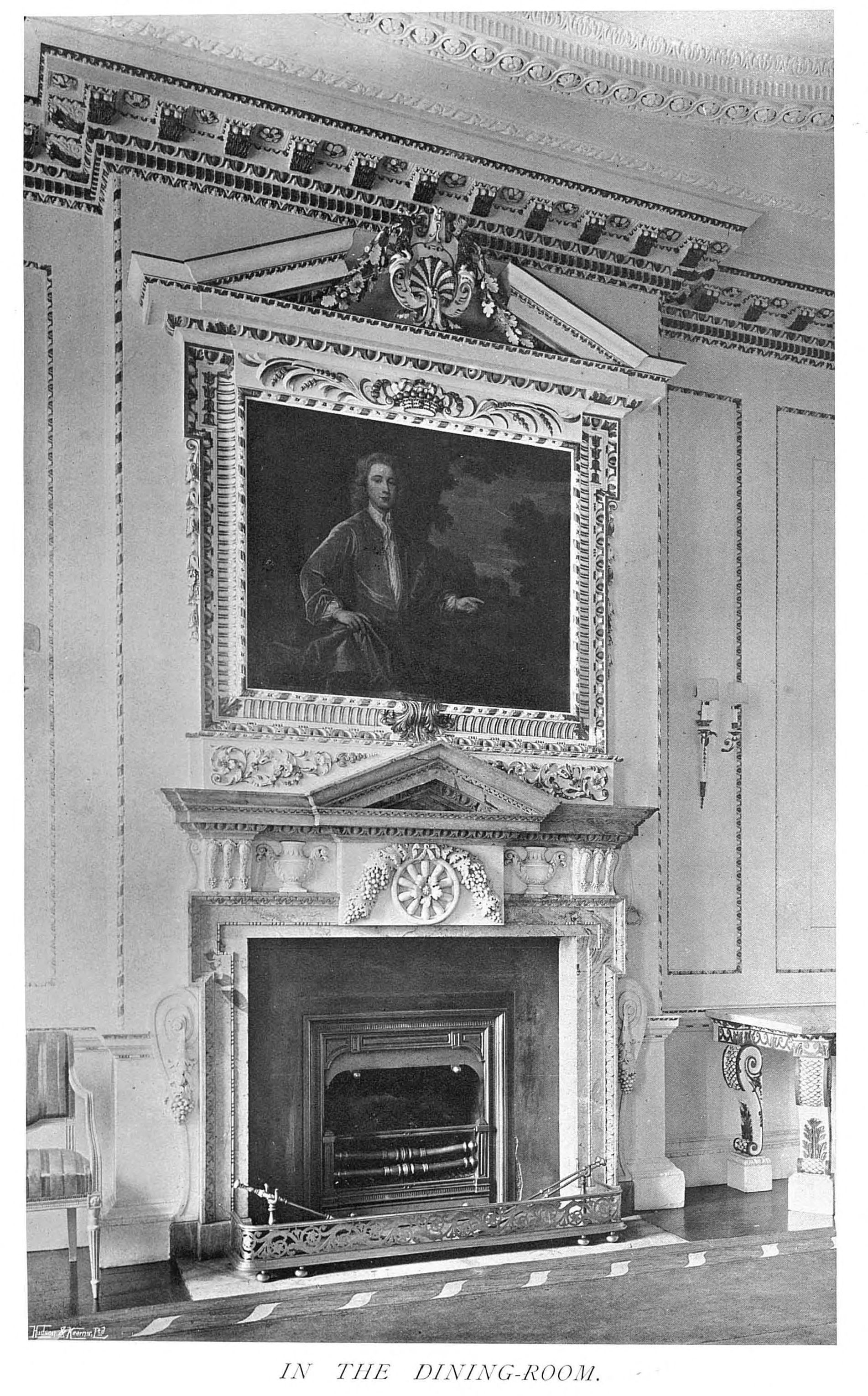
Fireplace in dining room

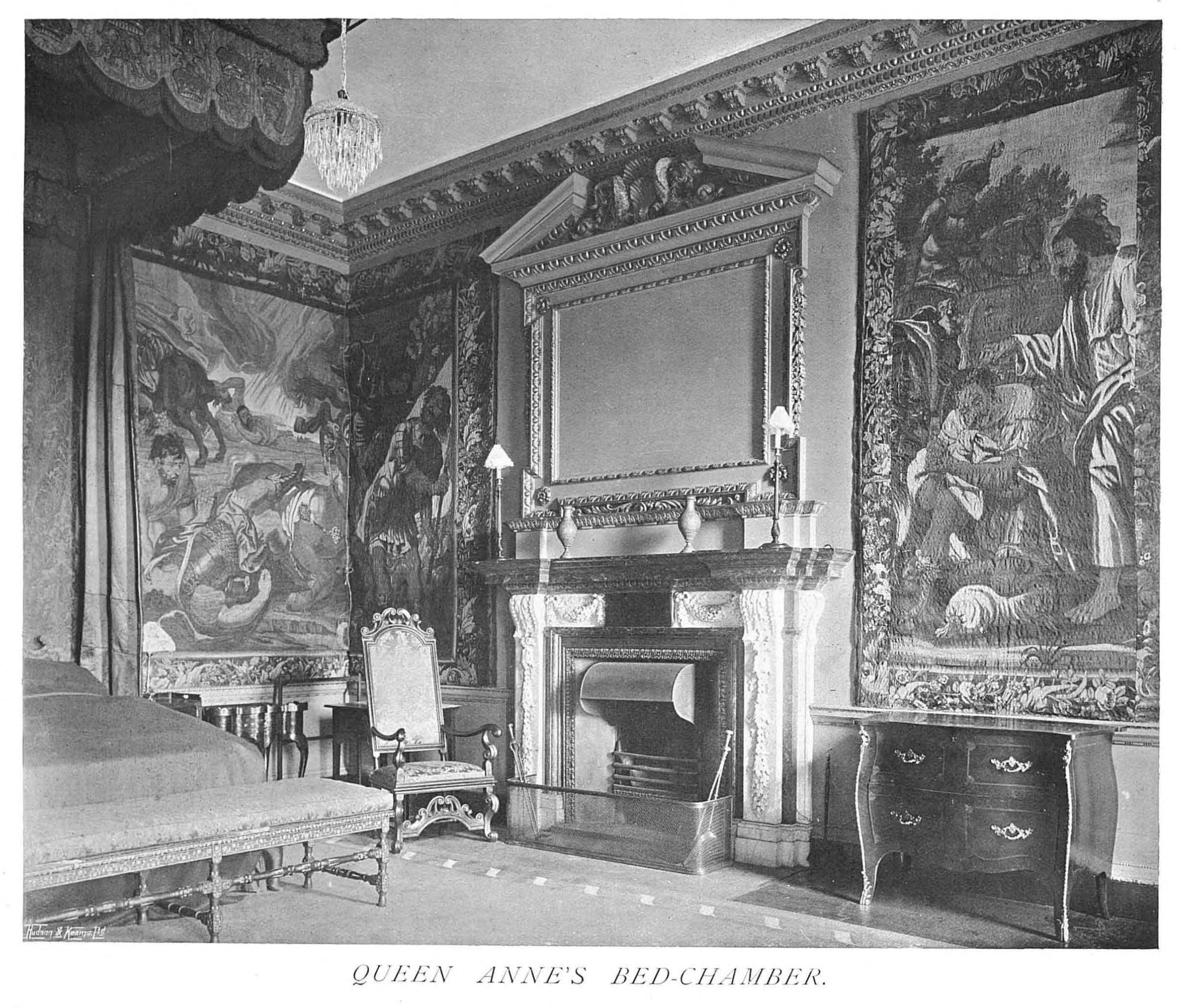
Queen Anne's bedchamber

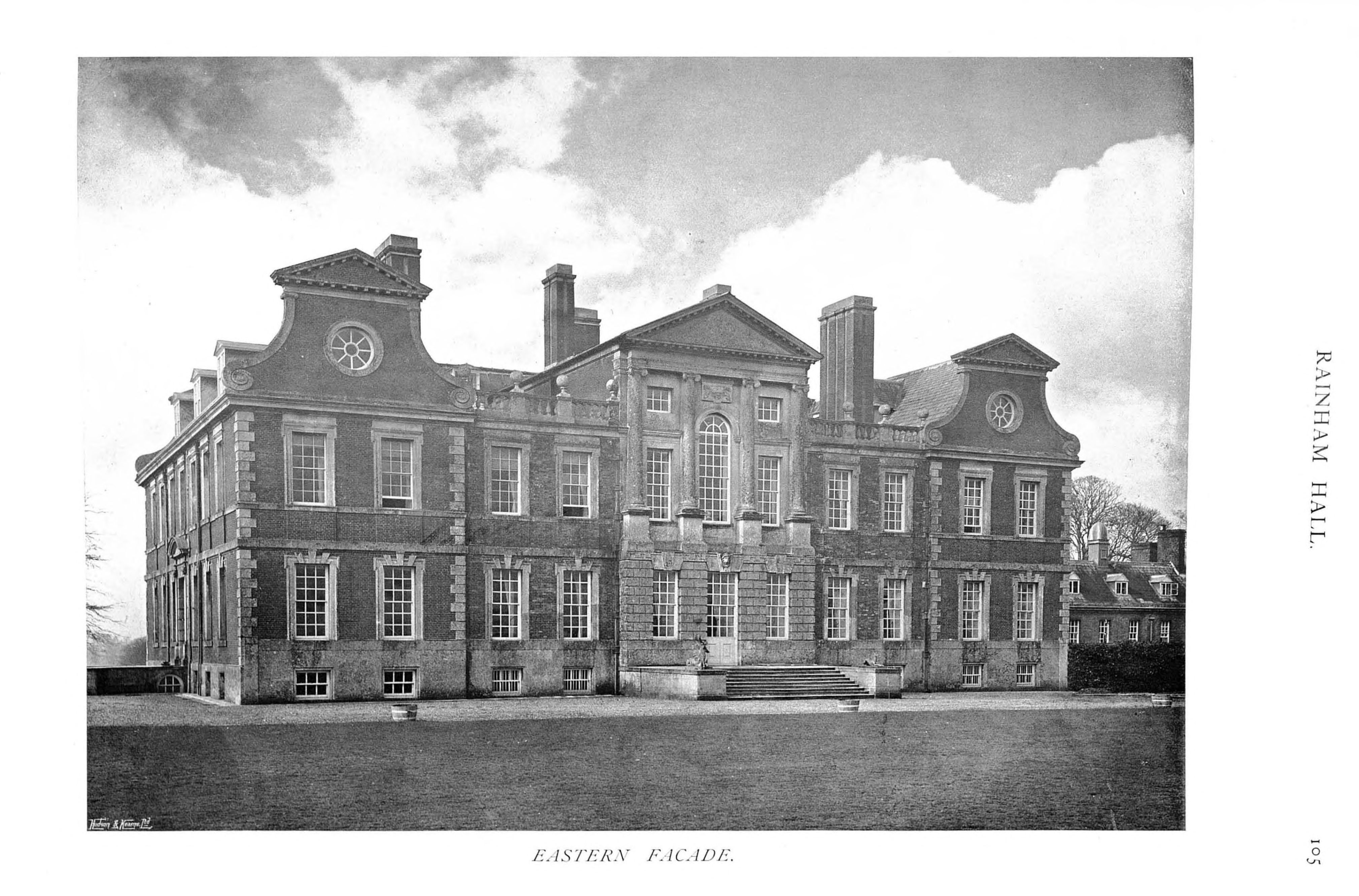
Eastern façade
