= George Townshend (Royal Navy officer) =

British naval commander

Admiral The Honourable George Townshend
- Born: 29 October 1716
- Died: August 1769 (aged 52)
- Relatives: Charles Townshend, 2nd Viscount Townshend (father); Dorothy Townshend (mother)
- Military career
- Allegiance: Kingdom of Great Britain
- Branch: Royal Navy
- Service years: 1729–1769
- Rank: Admiral
- Commands: HMS Tartar; HMS Chatham; HMS Bedford; Jamaica Station
- Conflicts: War of the Austrian Succession; Battle of Toulon; Siege of Genoa; Seven Years' War

Admiral George Townshend (29 October 1716 – August 1769) was a British naval commander.

== Naval career ==
Townshend was the eldest son of Charles Townshend, 2nd Viscount Townshend, and his second wife Dorothy, sister of Prime Minister Sir Robert Walpole.

Townshend served in the Royal Navy and, having been promoted to post captain on 30 January 1739, he was given command of the third-rate HMS Bedford in 1743 and saw action at the Battle of Toulon in February 1744 before commanding British fleet at the Siege of Genoa in 1746 during the War of the Austrian Succession. He served as Commander-in-Chief of the Jamaica Station from 1749 to 1752, and having been promoted to rear admiral on 6 January 1755, he served as Commander-in-Chief of the Jamaica Station again from 1755 to 1757.

Promoted to vice admiral in February 1757 and to full admiral in 1765, he died in August 1769.

== Sources ==
- Cundall, Frank (1915). Historic Jamaica. West India Committee.
- Lodge, Sir Richard (1930). Studies in Eighteenth Century Diplomacy 1740-1748. John Murray.

Military offices
Preceded by Polycarpus Taylor acting	Commander-in-Chief, Jamaica Station; 1749–1752	Succeeded by Vacant
Preceded by Vacant	Commander-in-Chief, Jamaica Station; 1755–1757	Succeeded by Thomas Cotes
