= Brown Lady of Raynham Hall =

Ghost of Raynham Hall in Norfolk, England

Coordinates: 52.796°N 0.790°E

Claimed photograph of the ghost, taken by Captain Hubert C. Provand. First published in Country Life, 1936

The Brown Lady of Raynham Hall is a ghost that reportedly haunts Raynham Hall in Norfolk, England. It became one of the most famous hauntings in the United Kingdom when photographers from Country Life magazine claimed to have captured its image. The "Brown Lady" is so named because of the brown brocade dress it is claimed she wears. Her name is said to be "Lady Dorothy"

== Identity of the ghost ==
According to legend, the apparition is that of Dorothy Walpole (1686–1726), the sister of Robert Walpole, generally regarded as the first Prime Minister of Great Britain. She was the second wife of Charles Townshend, 2nd Viscount Townshend, who was notorious for his violent temper. The story says that when Townshend discovered that his wife had committed adultery with Lord Wharton, he punished her by locking her in her rooms in the family home, Raynham Hall. According to Mary Wortley Montagu, Dorothy was in fact entrapped by the Countess of Wharton. She invited Dorothy over to stay for a few days knowing that her husband would never allow her to leave, not even to see her children. She remained at Raynham Hall until her death in 1726 from smallpox.

== Sightings ==
The first recorded claim of a sighting of the ghost was by Lucia C. Stone concerning a gathering at Raynham Hall in the Christmas of 1835. Stone says that Charles Townshend had invited various guests to the Hall, including a Colonel Loftus, to join in the Christmas festivities. Loftus and another guest named Hawkins said they had seen the "Brown Lady" one night as they approached their bedrooms, noting in particular the dated brown dress she wore. The following evening Loftus claimed to have seen the "Brown Lady" again, later reporting that on this occasion he was drawn to the spectre's empty eye-sockets, dark in the glowing face. Loftus' sightings led to some staff permanently leaving Raynham Hall.

The next reported sighting of the "Brown Lady" was made in 1836 by Captain Frederick Marryat, a friend of novelist Charles Dickens, and the author of a series of popular sea novels. It is said that Marryat requested that he spend the night in the most haunted room of Raynham Hall to prove his theory that the haunting was caused by local smugglers anxious to keep people away from the area. Writing in 1891, Florence Marryat said of her father's experience:

…he took possession of the room in which the portrait of the apparition hung, and in which she had been often seen, and slept each night with a loaded revolver under his pillow. For two days, however, he saw nothing, and the third was to be the limit of his stay. On the third night, however, two young men (nephews of the baronet), knocked at his door as he was undressing to go to bed, and asked him to step over to their room (which was at the other end of the corridor), and give them his opinion on a new gun just arrived from London. My father was in his shirt and trousers, but as the hour was late, and everybody had retired to rest except themselves, he prepared to accompany them as he was. As they were leaving the room, he caught up his revolver, “in case you meet the Brown Lady,” he said, laughing. When the inspection of the gun was over, the young men in the same spirit declared they would accompany my father back again, “in case you meet the Brown Lady,” they repeated, laughing also. The three gentlemen therefore returned in company.

The corridor was long and dark, for the lights had been extinguished, but as they reached the middle of it, they saw the glimmer of a lamp coming towards them from the other end. “One of the ladies going to visit the nurseries,” whispered the young Townshends to my father. Now the bedroom doors in that corridor faced each other, and each room had a double door with a space between, as is the case in many old-fashioned houses. My father, as I have said, was in shirt and trousers only, and his native modesty made him feel uncomfortable, so he slipped within one of the outer doors (his friends following his example), in order to conceal himself until the lady should have passed by.

I have heard him describe how he watched her approaching nearer and nearer, through the chink of the door, until, as she was close enough for him to distinguish the colors and style of her costume, he recognised the figure as the facsimile of the portrait of “The Brown Lady”. He had his finger on the trigger of his revolver, and was about to demand it to stop and give the reason for its presence there, when the figure halted of its own accord before the door behind which he stood, and holding the lighted lamp she carried to her features, grinned in a malicious and diabolical manner at him. This act so infuriated my father, who was anything but lamb-like in disposition, that he sprang into the corridor with a bound, and discharged the revolver right in her face. The figure instantly disappeared - the figure at which for several minutes three men had been looking together – and the bullet passed through the outer door of the room on the opposite side of the corridor, and lodged in the panel of the inner one. My father never attempted again to interfere with "The Brown Lady of Raynham".

Lady Townshend reported that the "Brown Lady" was next seen in 1926, when her son and his friend claimed to have seen the ghost on the staircase, identifying the ghostly figure with the portrait of Lady Dorothy Walpole which then hung in the haunted room.

Ever since Marryat's encounter with the Brown Lady, sightings of her have dwindled - with some claiming that she now haunts nearby Houghton Hall and Sandringham House.

== Country Life magazine ==
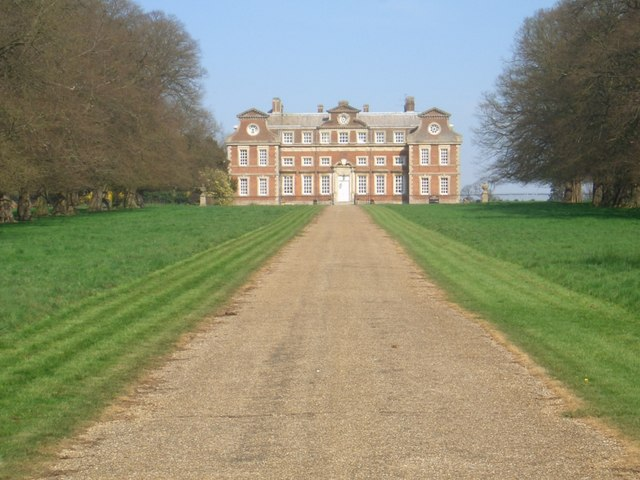
Raynham Hall

On September 19, 1936, Captain Hubert C. Provand, a London-based photographer working for Country Life magazine, and his assistant, Indre Shira, were taking photographs of Raynham Hall for an article. They claim that they had already taken a photograph of the Hall's main staircase and were setting up to take a second when Shira saw "a vapoury form gradually assuming the appearance of a woman" moving down the stairs towards them. Under Shira's direction Provand quickly took the cap off the lens while Shira pressed the trigger to activate the camera's flash. Later, when the negative was developed, the famous image of the "Brown Lady" was revealed. The account of Provand and Shira's ghostly experience at Raynham Hall was published in Country Life magazine on December 26, 1936 along with the photograph of the Brown Lady. The photograph and the account of its taking also appeared in the January 4, 1937 edition of Life magazine.

Shortly thereafter, the noted paranormal investigator Harry Price interviewed Provand and Shira and reported, "I will say at once I was impressed. I was told a perfectly simple story: Mr. Indre Shira saw the apparition descending the stairs at the precise moment when Captain Provand’s head was under the black cloth. A shout – and the cap was off and the flashbulb fired, with the results which we now see. I could not shake their story, and I had no right to disbelieve them. Only collusion between the two men would account for the ghost if it is a fake. The negative is entirely innocent of any faking."

== Skeptical reception ==
Some critics have claimed that Shira faked the image by putting grease or a similar substance on the lens in the shape of a figure, or moved down the stairs himself during an exposure. Others claim that the image is an accidental double exposure or that light somehow got into the camera.

Joe Nickell has written that a detailed examination of the photograph shows evidence of double exposure. John Fairley and Simon Welfare wrote "there is a pale line above each stair-tread, indicating that one picture has been superimposed over the other; a patch of reflected light at the top of the right-hand banister appears twice."

The magician John Booth wrote the photograph could easily be duplicated by naturalistic methods. Booth had the magician Ron Wilson cover himself in a bed sheet and descend the grand staircase at The Magic Castle in Hollywood. The faked ghost image looked very similar to the Raynham Hall photograph.

Other critics point out that the image of the lady very closely resembles that of a standard Virgin Mary statue as would be found in any Catholic church, the light patch covering the bottom one third of the image, resembling an inverted "V" shape, being very indicative, as the outer garment above it drapes down on either side at an angle. Also the head is covered and the hands appear to be together as in prayer, and the square or rectangular pedestal on which she stands is also clearly visible. This strongly suggests that the photo is a simple superimposition of the Madonna statue onto the empty staircase.

== Adaptions ==
In 1948, an unknown author and artist King Ward adapted the legend into "The Grim Lady of Raynham Hall," a 2-page comic story published in issue #2 of the American Comics Group horror anthology Adventures into the Unknown. In 1953, uncredited creators produced a 1-page comic for issue #9 of the Standard Comics horror anthology Adventures into Darkness based on the "Brown Lady" story. In 1974, writer Carl Wessler, penciler J. Noriega, and inker Alfredo Alcala created a 3-page story about Raynham Hall as "The Most Haunted House in England!" in issue #23 of the DC Comics horror anthology Ghosts.

== See also ==
- List of ghosts
