= Siege of Genoa (1746) =

Uprising during the War of Austrian Succession

- Part of War of the Austrian Succession
Date	1746
Location	Genoa, Republic of Genoa 44°24′26″N 8°56′02″E
Result	Austro-British-Sardinian victory.

Belligerents
Great Britain; Austria (Kingdom of Sardinia) Sardinia	Republic of Genoa

Commanders and leaders
(Kingdom of Great Britain) George Townshend (Habsburg monarchy) (Kingdom of Sardinia) Botta d'Adorno	(Republic of Genoa) Giovanni Francesco II Brignole Sale
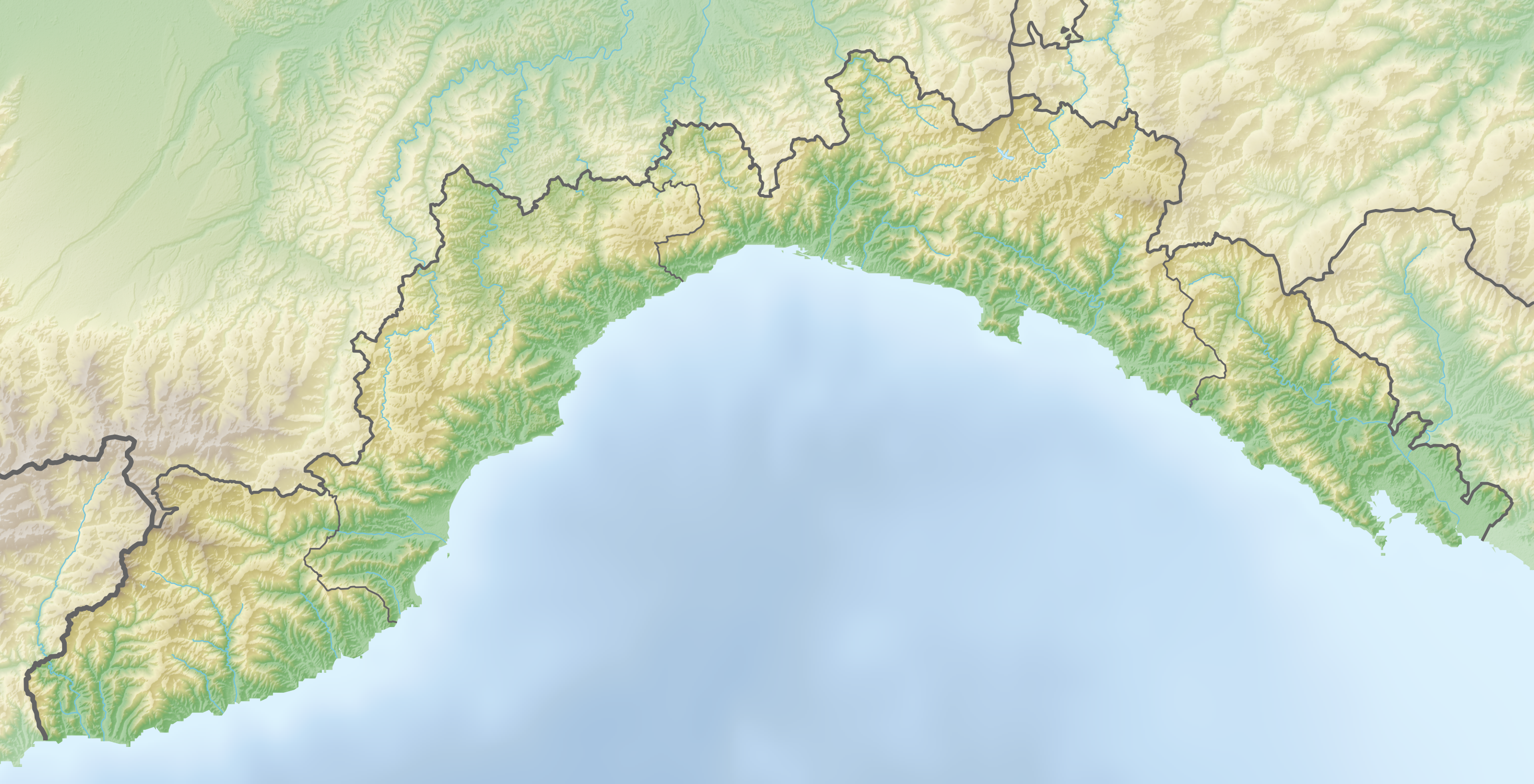
- Location within Liguria Siege of Genoa (1746) (Italy)

The siege of Genoa took place in 1746 during the War of the Austrian Succession when an Allied force of Austrians, Sardinian soldiers, and British sailors besieged the capital of the Republic of Genoa. The city ultimately surrendered to commander Antoniotto Botta Adorno, after being abandoned by its principal allies France and Spain. The manner in which Austria had negotiated a separate surrender that didn't include Britain or Sardinia angered their allies, and for a while the British fleet under George Townshend were instructed by Arthur Villettes to continue their blockade of the city in protest until ordered to cease it by the Duke of Newcastle in London.

== Aftermath ==
The Austrians mistreated many of the inhabitants of Genoa, causing deep resentment. Following the departure of large numbers of the Austrians for an Allied invasion of France, the city rose on 7 December 1746, driving out the remainder of the garrison. An attempt to retake the city the following year failed.

== Bibliography ==
- Lodge, Sir Richard. Studies in Eighteenth Century Diplomacy 1740-1748. John Murray, 1930.
