= Dorothy Townshend, Viscountess Townshend =

English noblewoman (1686–1726)

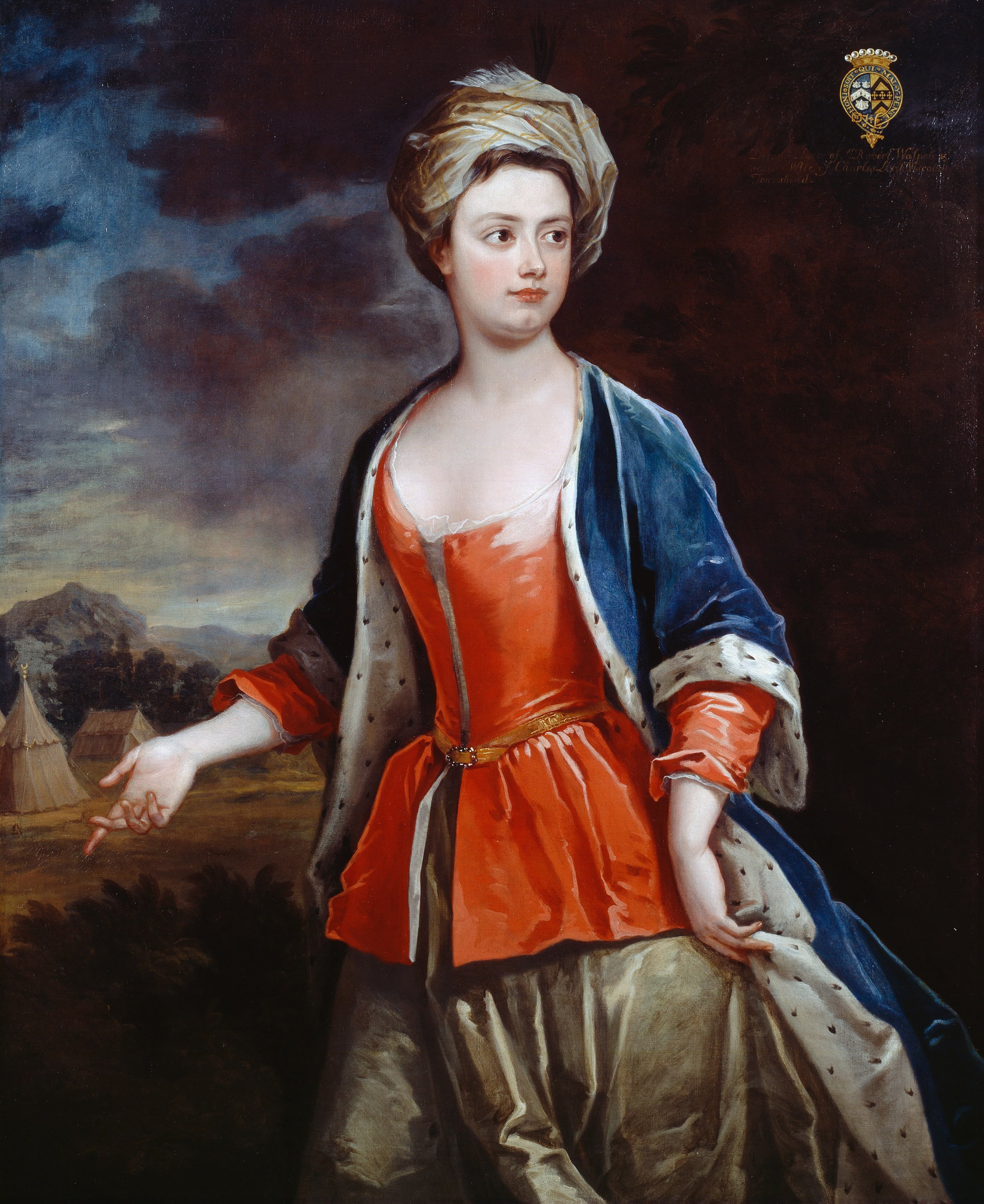
- Born: 18 September 1686
- Died: 29 March 1726 (aged 39)
- Spouse: Charles Townshend, 2nd Viscount Townshend

Dorothy Townshend, Viscountess Townshend (née Walpole; 18 September 1686 – 29 March 1726) was an English noblewoman. Born on 18 September 1686 at Houghton Hall, she was the thirteenth child born to Robert Walpole and his wife Mary. She married Charles Townshend, 2nd Viscount Townshend on 6 July 1713, becoming his second wife. She died under mysterious circumstances, or possibly of smallpox, on 29 March 1726.

== Family ==
Children of the 2nd Viscount Townshend and Dorothy Walpole:

- Hon. Dorothy Townshend b. 5 May 1714, married Spencer Cowper (later Dean of Durham) on 12 May 1743, d. 19 May 1779
- Hon. George Townshend b. 29 October 1715 d. Aug 1769
- Hon. Augustus Townshend b. 5 October 1716 d. 1746.
- Hon. Horatio Townshend b. 20 September 1717 d. 1764
- Hon. Robert Townshend b. 15 October 1718, bur. 18 January 1719
- Very Rev. The Hon. Edward Townshend b. 25 October 1719, d. 27 January 1765, Dean of Norwich (1761–1765), Canon of Westminster (1749–1761)
- Hon. Mary Townshend (d. 29 December 1776) married (17 March 1763.) Lieutenant General Edward Cornwallis (5 Mar 1724 – 14 Jan 1776), son of Charles Cornwallis, 4th Baron Cornwallis of Eye and Lady Charlotte Butler, without issue.
- Hon. Richard Townshend b. 8 September 1721 bur. 12 November 1721.
- Hon. Henrietta Townshend bap. 28 April 1723, bur. 27 October 1723

== Legends ==
Based on rumours that she was caught in an affair with Thomas Wharton, 1st Marquess of Wharton, before her marriage to Charles and never told him, she is said to have been possibly locked up in Raynham Hall before a mock funeral took place. She is alleged to be the identity of the Brown Lady of Raynham Hall.
