= Philip Lloyd (priest) =

American Dean

Philip Lloyd, D.D. (15 May 1729 – 31 May 1790) was an Anglican Dean in the eighteenth century.

Lloyd was born at Greenwich and was educated at Christ Church, Oxford, where he matriculated in 1746, graduating B.A. in 1750, M.A. in 1752, and B.D ad D.D. in 1763. He was Vicar of Piddletown until 1765 when he became Dean of Norwich, a post he held until his death in Norwich.

== Notes ==
Church of England titles
Preceded by Edward Townshend	Dean of Norwich; 1765–1790	Succeeded by Joseph Turner
