= Edward Townshend =

Anglican dean (1719–1765)

The Hon Edward Townshend, D.D. (25 October 1719, Raynham, Norfolk – 27 January 1765, Bath) was an Anglican dean in the eighteenth century.

The son of Charles Townshend, 2nd Viscount Townshend, he was educated at Eton and Trinity College, Cambridge. He was ordained in 1743. Townshend became Rector of Pulham in 1745; and of Oakley in 1748. He was Deputy Clerk of the Closet from 1746 until his appointment as Dean of Norwich in 1761.

== Notes ==
Church of England titles
Preceded by Thomas Bullock	Dean of Norwich; 1761–1765	Succeeded by Philip Lloyd
