= Title of Godfrey of Bouillon =

Title that Godfrey of Bouillon held when he became ruler of Jerusalem

The title of Advocatus Sancti Sepulchri, or Advocate of the Holy Sepulchre, has been ascribed to Godfrey of Bouillon in his role as the first Latin ruler of Jerusalem. In the aftermath of the First Crusade, there was disagreement among the clergy and secular leaders as the leadership of the Kingdom of Jerusalem. There was opposition to the naming of a king over the Holy City and the wearing of a crown in the city where Christ suffered with a crown of thorns. The original sources differ on the actual title assumed by Godfrey. However, it is generally accepted by most modern historians that, once Godfrey was selected to be leader, he declined to be crowned king instead taking the titles of prince (princeps) and advocate or defender of the Holy Sepulchre (advocatus Sancti Sepulchri).

== The First Crusade ==
At the beginning of eleventh century, the city of Jerusalem had been under Islamic rule for almost five centuries. Then a series of events began to limit the access of Christian pilgrims to the Holy City and encroach on the Byzantine Empire. The First Crusade, first called for in 1095, sought to restore Jerusalem to Christian control. Begun as a joint effort of Western Europe and Constantinople, the final determination was that newly captured territory would be formed as its own kingdom.

=== Background ===
Among the earliest of the faithful to travel to the Holy Land was Saint Helena, mother of Constantine the Great, whose pilgrimage began in 326 AD. According to tradition, her travels led to the discovery of the True Cross. On the site of discovery, her son Constantine ordered the building of the Church of the Holy Sepulchre. Pilgrimages to the Holy Land became a tradition of devout Christians and continued even after the conquest of these lands by the Muslims following the Siege of Jerusalem in the 7th century.

A major disruption to these pilgrimages when the Fatimid caliph al-Hakim ordered the destruction of the Church of the Holy Sepulchre in Jerusalem on 28 September 1009. The subsequent persecution of Christians and destruction of their churches lasted for more than a decade. After the Battle of Manzikert in 1071, the Seljuk Turks overcame the Byzantines and invaded Asia Minor. Shortly thereafter, the Seljuks captured Jerusalem from the Fatimides, and his fellow tribesmen systematically disrupted Christian pilgrimage routes. This would lead to the First Crusade.

=== The call to arms ===
The beginning of the First Crusade is generally marked by the Council of Clermont held from 17–27 November 1095 by Urban II, and resulted in the mobilization of Western Europe to go to the Holy Land. After the city of Jerusalem was captured by the Seljuks, the cradle of Christianity was then in the hands of hostile Muslims. This intrusion resulted in the hindering of pilgrimages and concern of the fate of the churches in the city, in particular the Church of the Holy Sepulchre. Urban II called for an armed response to free the Holy City which was answered throughout Europe. His impassioned speech depicted the captivity of the city where Christ had suffered and died.

Byzantine emperor Alexios I Komnenos, worried about the advances of the Seljuks into his territory, also had asked the pope for aid against the invading Turks and was expected to take a major role in the expedition. It remains unclear if Urban II had plans for how the lands conquered by his Crusaders would be governed. At a minimum, those regions that had been captured from Byzantium would reasonably be expected to be returned to the empire's control. Those areas had significant Greek-speaking populations should welcome the restoration Byzantine control and likely extended as far south as Antioch. Any further would have taxed the empire's infrastructure and resources.

=== The beginning of the Crusade ===
The spiritual leader of the Crusade was Adhemar of Le Puy, appointed by the pope as his legate. The principal military leaders were Raymond of Saint-Gilles, Godfrey of Bouillon, his brother Baldwin of Boulogne and cousin Baldwin of Bourcq, Bohemond of Taranto and his nephew Tancred, Robert Curthose, Stephen of Blois, Hugh of Vermandois, and Robert II of Flanders. In total and including non-combatants, the forces are estimated to have numbered as many as 100,000. Departing in the summer of 1096, the crusader forces gradually arrived in Anatolia. Their first encounter was at the Siege of Nicaea in June 1097 resulting in a Crusader victory. In July, the crusaders won the Battle of Dorylaeum.

Crusader distrust of Alexios began after Nicaea, as the Seljuk defenders chose to surrender to the Byzantine forces rather than the Franks. Dorylaeum was also returned to the empire as the Crusaders marched south. They now entered an area of Palestine that was traditionally not under Byzantine control. Alexios had a role as a protector of the Orthodox churches in the Holy Land, and may have expected that newly captured lands would be his vassals. Whatever arrangements between the emperor and the Crusader leaders would soon change.

=== The siege of Antioch ===
With their victories, the Crusader army then marched to Antioch, situated midway between Constantinople and Jerusalem. Described in a letter by Stephen of Blois as "a city very extensive, fortified with incredible strength and almost impregnable", the idea of taking the city by assault was a discouraging one. The army began the Siege of Antioch on 20 October 1097, called one of the "greatest sieges in history," resulted in the capture of most of the city except for the citadel by 3 June 1098. John the Oxite was reinstated as Greek Orthodox Patriarch of Antioch by Adhemar who wished to keep good relations with the Byzantines, especially as Bohemond planning to claim the city for himself. However, the city was now short on food, and the army of Kerbogha was still a threat, establishing a siege of the city on 9 June.

Many of the Crusaders had deserted before Kerbogha arrived, including Stephen of Blois. Stephen had seen Kerbogha's army encamped near Antioch and assumed all hope was lost. The latest wave of deserters confirmed his fears. Stephen and the other deserters met Alexios, who was on his way to assist the Crusaders. Stephen convinced him that his colleagues were likely dead. Knowing that there was another Seljuk army nearby, he decided to return to Constantinople rather than risking battle. Bohemond's half-brother Guy of Hauteville was on the emperor's staff and begged him to march on, on the chance that the Crusading force could still be saved. But no one supported his plea. The Byzantine army retreated northward.

It would have fared better for both the empire and eastern Christendom had Alexios listened to Guy's pleas, even though he could not have reached Antioch before the battle had been fought. When the Crusaders learned that the imperial army had turned back, their bitterness was profound. They were the warriors of Christ, fighting against the infidel, and the refusal to come to their aid was regarded as an act of treason towards the Church. The Crusaders could not appreciate the emperor's other duties, and that the neglect showed at Antioch justified their suspicion and dislike already felt towards the Greeks. The empire, and particularly Alexios, were never forgiven. From this point onward, any understandings with Byzantium were evidently "null and void."

As a result, Bohemond found it in himself to profit off of the situation. After Kerbogha fled, the citadel finally surrendered, but only to Bohemond personally, rather than to Raymond of Saint-Gilles, an outcome that seemed to have been arranged beforehand without Raymond's knowledge. He then ejected the troops not under his control. In response, Raymond kept sole control of the fortified bridge and the palace of the Seljuk governor of the city. But Raymond and Adhemar both fell ill, and their followers found themselves maltreated by the Normans and others. With little resistance, Bohemond behaved as the master of the city.

=== The capture of Jerusalem ===
Bohemond's refusal to turn over Antioch contributed to problems with the empire and among Crusader leaders. In early June, they reached Ramla, whose residents had fled. There, they discovered that the port of Jaffa had been abandoned by the Fatimids. Not wishing to leave the port unprotected, the leaders decided to leave what would become the Bishopric of Lydda and Ramla under the control of Robert of Rouen, the first Roman Catholic bishop in Palestine.

When the First Crusade began, Jerusalem was held by the Seljuk Turks. Al-Afdal Shahanshah, the new Fatimid vizier recaptured the city in August 1098. Not wishing the engage the large Frankish army, he offered to negotiate a settlement over Jerusalem. The offer was rebuffed by the leaders. The Egyptians were surprised at the rejection, as they did not have time to mount an effective counteroffensive, and so preferred negotiation.

On 6 June 1099, the Crusading armies, provisioned with the supplies discovered at Ramla, set off for Jerusalem. As they reached al-Qubayba, just to the west, a delegation of Christians from Bethlehem pleaded for the Franks to free them from Islamic rule. Tancred and Baldwin of Bourcq were dispatched with a force of a hundred knights. They reached Christ's birthplace, liberating the city, celebrated by a Mass at the Church of the Nativity. Tancred returned to join the main army, but first placing his banner above the sacred church of Bethlehem.

The army reached the outer fortifications of Jerusalem on 7 June 1099 and began the Siege of Jerusalem. An initial attack on the city failed, and the siege became a stalemate, until they breached the walls on 15 July 1099. Iftikhar al-Dawla, the commander of the garrison, struck a deal with Raymond, surrendering the citadel in return for being granted safe passage to Ascalon. For two days, the Crusaders massacred the inhabitants and pillaged the city. Jerusalem had been returned to Christian rule.

== The election of Godfrey ==
Urban II died on 29 July 1099, fourteen days after the fall of Jerusalem to the Crusaders, but the news of the liberation of the Holy City had not yet reached Italy. He was succeeded by Paschal II. The debate over the rule of Jerusalem – secular or ecclesiastical – would be made without papal leadership. The clergy's desire to elect a patriarch first was rejected, and a ruler was to be selected, a choice narrowed to Raymond of Saint-Gilles and Godfrey of Bouillon. Godfrey was chosen but would not wear a crown, reflecting the mood of the Crusaders.

=== The debate over leadership ===
On 17 July 1099, the leaders of the Crusade met to discuss the administration of Jerusalem. Urgent matters such as disposal of corpses, quarters for soldiers and pilgrims, and preparations to meet an expected Egyptian counterattack had to be dealt with. The question of the election of a king was raised, causing a protest from the clergy. They felt that spiritual needs came first and a patriarch must be first appointed who would then preside over the election of a ruler. Had Symeon II of Jerusalem remained in the city, his rights would as patriarch have been respected by both Adhemar and the Crusaders who knew of him from Antioch. But he had died a few days earlier, and no others were acceptable and the proposal to elect the patriarch before the king was abandoned.

According to the account of Raymond of Aguilers in his Historia Francorum qui ceperunt Iherusalem, the clergy were opposed to the naming of a king in the Holy City. He also raised the specter of "the kingdom of David," a view held commonly by the Crusaders.

About this time a public assembly was held, for the leaders of the army were quarreling with each other. There was dissatisfaction because Tancred had occupied Bethlehem and had placed his standard over the church of the Nativity. An effort was also made to elect one of the princes king to have custody of the city. The bishops and clergy replied "You ought not to choose a king where the Lord suffered and was crowned. For if a [king], degenerate in faith and virtue, should say in his heart, 'I sit upon the throne of David and hold his kingdom,' the Lord would probably destroy him and be angry with place and people. But there should be an advocate to guard the city and divide the tributes and rents of the region among the guardians of the city." For this and many other reasons the election was stopped and put off until the eighth day after the capture of Jerusalem.

And so, the leaders were unable to agree upon a suitable candidate and the clergy was against the appointment of a king over the Holy City. The place that Christ suffered and had been crowned with thorns should be a spiritual realm, governed by the Church. The ecclesiastical leader should be supported by a secular ruler bearing the lesser title of "advocate" or "protector."

From the beginning, Jerusalem was variously called the kingdom of David, the kingdom of Judea, the kingdom of God and the patrimony of Christ. For example, at the Council of Clermont, Fulcher of Chartres, writing in his Gesta Francorum Iherusalem Peregrinantium, reported that Urban II said:

For the Turks, a Persian people, have attacked them, as many of you already know, and have advanced as far into the Roman territory as that part of the Mediterranean which is called the Arm of St. George; and, by seizing more and more of the lands of the Christians, they have already often conquered them in battle, have killed and captured many, have destroyed the churches, and have devastated the kingdom of God.

Baldric of Dol wrote in his Historiæ Hierosolymitanæ that the pope cited Psalm 79:1–3 to demonstrate that the heathens (Muslims) had conquered the haeareditas (inheritance) of God. According to Baldric's account of the speech at Clermont, Urban II said:

We weep and wail, brethren, alas, like the Psalmist, in our inmost heart! We are wretched and unhappy, and in us is that prophecy fulfilled: "O God, the heathen nations are come into thine inheritance; thy holy temple have they defiled; they have laid Jerusalem in heaps; the dead bodies of thy servants have been given to be food for the birds of the heaven, the flesh of thy saints unto the beasts of the earth. Their blood have they shed like water round about Jerusalem, and there was none to bury them."

When they entered Jerusalem, the Crusaders regarded it as a regnum (kingdom). The First Crusade had been conducted in an atmosphere of religious fervor and the Crusaders entering Jerusalem are believed to have thought they were entering the realm of the Biblical Jewish kings who were succeeded by Christ. In the kingdom of David and Jesus, the messianic belief was that it was wrong to elect a king where Christ had worn a crown of thorns.

=== The selection of the ruler of the kingdom ===
The right to rule the Holy City now became the focus of this friction. Raymond of Saint-Gilles, once the Crusade's prospective leader, had lost so much support because of the debacle at Arqa and his continued support of the discredited Holy Lance that he was now eclipsed by Godfrey of Bouillon. The early chroniclers differ some on precisely what happened.

Gesta Francorum describes the selection of Godfrey as leader in the simplest of terms:

Then our leaders in council decided that each one should offer alms with prayers, that the Lord might choose for Himself whom He wanted to reign over the others and rule the city... However, on the eighth day after the city was captured, they chose Godfrey as head of the city to fight the pagans and guard the Christians. On the day of St. Peter ad Vincula they likewise chose as Patriarch a certain very wise and honorable man, Arnulf by name. This city was captured by God's Christians on the fifteenth day of July, the sixth day of the week.

The chronicle of Raymond of Aguilers states:

Accordingly, after six or seven days the princes solemnly began to consider the matter of choosing a ruler, who, assuming charge of all matters. While this was taking place, some of the clergy assembled and said to the princes, "We approve your election, but if you proceed rightly and properly, you will first choose a spiritual vicar, as eternal matters come before temporal; after this, a ruler to preside over secular matters. Otherwise, we shall hold invalid whatever you do." The princes were exceedingly angered when they heard this and proceeded the more quickly with the election. The clergy had been weakened by the departure of Lord Adhemar, Pontiff of Puy, who, in his life had held our army together with holy deeds and words. The princes urged the Count of St. Gilles to accept the kingdom. But he said that he abhorred the name of king in that city, though he would consent to have others accept it. For this reason they together chose the Duke and placed him in charge of the Sepulchre of the Lord.

Peter Tudebode was part of the Army of Raymond of Saint-Gilles and wrote an account of the Crusade called Historia de Hierosolymitano itinere. Peter was present in Jerusalem and reported the following account:

Here they chose a leader Godfrey as king... He would rule over holy Jerusalem and excommunicate the pagans. [On] the same day they held a council in which they elected the leader Godfrey, the prince of the city. In the same way, they chose a certain wise and honorable patriarch as patriarch. This city was captured by the Christians on the 17th day of July, on Friday assisted by our Lord Jesus Christ, whose honor and glory will be forever and ever.

And so on 22 July 1099, Godfrey of Bouillon was elected the first Latin ruler of Jerusalem. Shortly thereafter, on 1 August 1099, Arnulf of Chocques was elected as the first Latin Patriarch of Jerusalem.

=== The Crown of Thorns ===
It is accepted by historians that after his election Godfrey refused to wear a crown, or diadem, in Jerusalem where Christ had worn the crown of thorns. Numerous original and derivative sources confirm this.

Benedictine historian Guibert of Nogent wrote in his Dei gesta per Francos (God's deeds through the Franks):

And he [King Godefrid] is buried, as a testimony of his faith and life which he had merited eternal redemption, near the place of the Sunday Passion itself; in it he obtained by right in every way the monument which had been excavated, and which he had defended against the trampling and intrusion of the Gentiles. Whose wonderful humility and modesty, even to be imitated by monks, marked the very remarkable times of his reign by the title, that he had never worn a royal diadem within the city of Jerusalem.

Historia belli sacri (Tudebodus imitatus et continuatus) was a history written by an unknown monk at the Abbey of Monte Cassino around 1130. The Historia covers the First Crusade and the early days of the Principality of Antioch. The anonymous work states that:

After this a plan arose among the nobles. any of them in the city of Jerusalem would be considered a king. For it was not fitting that such and such a city should remain without a ruler... [t]hey all immediately chose [Gottifred] as king with one vote and with the same mind. they surrendered the city to him. But who, as they say, as long as he lived in the body, was so humiliated that he never used a crown on his head, out of reverence for him who there wore a crown of thorns on his head.

Chronicler and archbishop William of Tyre wrote in his Chronique, Historia rerum in partibus transmarinis gestarum:

Why Duke Godfrey did not wear the crown. Being promoted, for the sake of humility, with a golden crown, in the manner of kings, he did not want to be marked in the holy city, being content with it and showing him reverence as the restorer of the human race, in the same place He carried a thorn even to the gallows of the cross, for our salvation.

The Lignages d'Outremer, written in the 13th century, would also claim that Godfrey of Bouillon would not wear a crown of gold where Jesus had worn one of thorns.

The holy city of Jerusalem, where our Savior suffered death and passion to redeem us from the pains of hell, was conquered from the enemies of our faith in the year of the Incarnation of our Lord Jesus Christ 1099, and was surrendered to the torches of Christ. The baron and the pilgrims elected as king seignor Godeffroy de Buillon, Duke of Lorraine, who would not wear a crown of gold; for he says that in the city where our Savior carried a crown of thorns on the day of his passion, he would not carry a crown of gold; and that that coronation that our Savior was in his passion for our surrender, sufficed for all the kings who were to be of that holy kingdom.

French archaeologist Melchior de Vogüé wrote in his Les églises de la Terre Sainte (1860) the following description of Godfrey's tomb:

A wonderful star, Godfrey the leader reclines here, Egypt's terror, the Arab's flight, the Persians' error. Although he was elected king, the king refused to be titled, nor to be crowned, but to serve under Christ. His care was to render Syon his own, and to follow the sacred dogmas of the law and of the horse in a Catholic manner; The whole schism was worn around him, just to be cherished. In this way he could earn a diadem even with his superiors. The militia is the mirror, the strength of the people, the anchor of the clergy."

The fact that Godfrey would not wear a crown did not resolve the dispute of what his title (or titles) would be and what his powers as the first Latin ruler of Jerusalem would be.

== The title of Godfrey ==
The original sources referred to Godfrey of Bouillon, elected as the first Latin ruler of the kingdom of Jerusalem, in three ways: king, prince or advocate. Later works frequently use the term baron instead of prince, and defender or protector versus advocate. In some cases, multiple designators were used.

=== King, or rex ===
Writers of chronicles who were not on the First Crusade tended to identify Godfrey as rex, or king. These chronicles or histories were written during the reign of Baldwin I of Jerusalem or later, when rulers had taken the title of king.

Guibert of Nogent in his Dei gesta per Francos, which was begun in 1108 and finished in 1121, states:

To which the King said: "The beast, he said, is not in abeyance, but when there is need, it will be: suppose it is done. "Therefore, at the discretion of the physician, out of wild danger, he discovered, as we have already mentioned, that it would be a disadvantage to the king, if the covering should proceed more quickly to the wound, unless the purulent part had first been exhausted and the torn part joined together internally."

Baldric of Dol wrote his Historiae Hierosolymitanae libri IV in 1105 while abbot of Bourgueil, later becoming archbishop of Dol-en-Bretagne. His account of Godfrey's title includes the following:

[L]et him present himself as a servant to God, even as he considers himself a king to men; needs must be consulted. The priesthood needs the kingdom; the priesthood must be supported by the kingdom and it is necessary to pray. and let us elect Godfred as a leader, whom we shall preside over as a substitute for the state. Indeed, many things are agreed upon in him which are proper to the dignity of royalty.

French friar Robert the Monk wrote his chronicle of the First Crusade, Historia Hierosolymitana, between 1107–1120. It was a rewriting of the Gesta Francorum with a Benedictine interpretation. He characterized Godfrey as follows:

Remove all your enemies from the city of the name of peace. the question of ordaining a king had to be discussed, so that, of course, one of them should be chosen who would preside over so many cities and so many people. Therefore by a common decree of all. by equal vote and general consent, Duke Godefridus was elected on the eighth day of the calendar after the city was attacked.

Historia belli sacri, orTudebodus imitatus et continuatus, was an anonymous account of the First Crusade compiled around 1130. It states:

When they heard this, they all immediately chose him as king with one vote and with the same mind. they surrendered the city to him.

English chronicler Orderic Vitalis wrote his Historia Ecclesiastica after 1110 and before 1141 and states:

[T]o the praise of him who wears thorns for the salvation of men, he was deigned to wear a crown, and the king of Jerusalem was compelled by ecclesiastical election to be buried for the terror of the Gentiles. (...ibi ad laudem eius qui spinet gestare serta pro salutae hominum dignatus est, diadema ferre et rex Ierusalem pro terrore gentili congominari ecclesiastica electione compulsai est)

Historian Anna Komnene, the daughter of Alexios I, wrote in her Alexiad around 1148:

When they had brought all into subjection and no one resisted them, they invested Godfrey with supreme authority by unanimous consent, and called him 'king.'

English historian William of Malmesbury wrote his Gesta Regum Anglorum, published in 1127. This was translated into English by John Allen Giles as William of Malmesbury's Chronicle of the kings of England: from the earliest period to the reign of King Stephen. It states:

[T]hen, Godfrey, that brilliant mirror of Christian nobility, in which, as in a splendid ceiling, the lustre of every virtue was reflected, was chosen king; all, in lively hope, agreeing, that they could in no wise better consult the advantage of the church; deferring, in the meantime, the election of a patriarch, who was to be appointed by the determination of the Roman Pontiff.

=== Prince, or principem ===
A different title is given to Godfrey of Bouillon by Bartolf of Nangis, by Peter Tudebode, and by Fulcher of Chartres, the latter two of whom (at least) took part in the First Crusade, as well as Albert of Aachen who had good sources among the participants. They employed some form of princeps, sometimes in variations such as princeps regini or princeps civitati.

Bartolf of Nangis described Godfrey as follows in the Gesta Francorum Iherusalem Expugnantium:

After the princes and the people had taken a little rest, they all by common consent made Godefrid the duke king and ruler (regem ac principem civitatis) of the city Jerusalem and the whole region they raised the canons.

Peter Tudebode wrote in the Historia de Hierosolymitano itinere describing him as follows:

Here they chose a leader Godfrey as king. On another day they held a council before the temple of the name, saying that every one should make prayers and alms, and that the god should choose for himself whom he pleased, and that he should reign over the others and the city. He would rule over holy Jerusalem and excommunicate the pagans....[On] the same day they held a council in which they elected the leader Godfred, the prince of the city. In the same way, they chose a certain wise and honorable patriarch as patriarch. This city was captured by the Christians on the 17th day of July, on Friday assisted by our Lord Jesus Christ, whose honor and glory will be forever and ever.

Albert of Aachen described him as follows in the Historia Hierosolymitanae:

Having now promoted Arnulf to this dignity of the holy and new Church, until a patriarch acceptable to God and the people had been chosen, it pleased the supreme prince of Jerusalem, Duke Godefrid, as well as all the rest, that twenty brethren in Christ should be buried in the temple of Dominic the worshipers of the divine office should be appointed, who would constantly sing praises and hymns to the living Lord God.

Fulcher of Chartres wrote of him in the Gesta Francorum Iherusalem Peregrinantium:

When Godefrid was soon made prince of the country.... In Laodicea, when the leader Godefrid was about to return, retaining Tancred and several others, he ruled the principality of Jerusalem, which he had undertaken to obtain by the consent of all.

The Annals of St. James of Liège describe Godfrey's authority in a similar fashion to that by Fulcher of Chartres, referring to Godfrey as a principaltus: dux poster Godefridus suit principatum.

=== Advocate, or Advocatus Sancti Sepulchri ===
Most modern Crusades historians refer to Godfrey of Bouillon as Advocatus Sancti Sepulchri, meaning advocate or defender of the Holy Sepulchre. The term advocatus had been in use since the time of Charlemagne, and the Glossarium ad scriptores mediae et infimae Latinitatis (1678) by Charles du Fresne, sieur du Cange provides an early definition of advocatus as applied to French royalty. The advocati, or avoués, included the barons, who held the advocateship of the abbeys in their domain. The designators advocatus and defensor were, since Roman times, used in conjunction with the titles of imperator, rex and princeps, and so it is feasible that Godfrey of Bouillon had multiple titles.

The main source of the title of advocatus comes from a letter of Daimbert of Pisa, also known as Dagobert. Daimbert's position when he went east was as papal legate to the Crusade, appointed by Urban II to succeed Adhemar of Le Puy, who had died on 1 August 1098. Shortly after Christmas 1099, Arnulf of Chocques, was deposed as Latin patriarch on the grounds that his election had been uncanonical. With the support of Bohemund, Daimbert was elected in his place. Public opinion had always held that the Holy Land should be the patrimony of the church, but Arnulf had been too weak to establish supremacy. Dagobert's position was stronger, as he was papal legate and had the support of the Pisan fleet

The letter in question was written in Laodicea in September or October 1099 while Daimbert was still papal legate and archbishop of Pisa. It was addressed to the successor of Urban II who had died on 29 July 1099. Paschal II was elected pope on 13 August 1099, but the letter was addressed simply to the "lord Pope of the Roman Church, to all the bishops, and all who cherish the Christian faith." Daimbert had just arrived there with the Pisan fleet when he encountered Raymond of Saint-Gilles and other princes returning west from Jerusalem. While Godfrey was still in Jerusalem, the letter was stated as from Daimbert, Godfrey and Raymond.

The letter it titled Epistula (Dagoberti) Pisani archiepiscopi et Godefridi ducis et Raimundi de S. Aegidii et uniuerei exercitus in terra Israel ad papam et omnes Christi fideles, and is identified as the official summary of the Crusade from 19 June 1097 – 12 August 1099.

To the lord Pope of the Roman Church, to all the bishops, and all who cherish the Christian faith; I, Archbishop of Pisa, and the other bishops, Duke Godfrey, now, by grace of God, Defender of the Holy Sepulchre, Raymond, Count of St. Gilles, and all the army of God which is in the land of Israel; greeting and prayer. Multiply your prayers and supplications with joy and exultation in the sight of the Lord, since God has enlarged His compassion by fulfilling in us what He promised in olden times.

The Regesta Regni Hierosolymitani, MXCVII–MCCXCI, a collection of some 900 charters of the kingdom of Jerusalem from 1097–1291 includes the following entry:

Daimbertus, archbishop of Pisa and legate of the Apostolic See, the Latin bishops of the Holy Land, Godofredo de Bullion, protector of the Holy Sepulchre, and Raymundus de S. Aegidius Urban II report that they themselves captured Nicaea, Antioch and Jerusalem until the Ascalonite victory in Syria and the Holy Land did excellently (Archives I, p. 201-204, No. 144).

— To this letter of Paschal 4 Maj. 1100 he replies congratulating him on the victories he has won and commends Mauritius, the bishop of Porto, to whom he had entrusted his duties (Archives I, p. 211-212, No. 154; Jaffé-Löwenfeld, No. 5835). c. Nov. 1).

Supporting evidence for the title of advocatus can be found in the Gesta episcoporum Virdunensium et abbatum sancti Vitoni by Laurence of Liège writing in the 1140s. He gives a detailed account of the preparations made by Godfrey and Baldwin for the First Crusade and is believed to have received reports from returning crusaders from the Contingent of Godfrey of Bouillon, many of which were from Liège. Laurence states that Godfrey was "appointed by God to rule the kingdom of the Holy City but that he was not called king but advocatus:

Moreover, Duke Godfrey, for the leadership of the Lothars, he promoted the kingdom of the Holy City from God, although he himself never suffered to be called king but its advocate. (Porro dux Godefridus ...pro Lothariorum ducata rengum Sanctae Urbis a Deo promoruit quamvis ipse numquam se regem sed advocatum eius passus sit appellari.)

Albert of Aachen links advocate and king when he describes Godfrey's authority as:

Dominium urbis et custodial Dominici Sepulchri (Dominion of the city and custodian of the Holy Sepulchre)

Historia et Gesta Ducis Gotfridi seu historia de desidione Terræ sanctæ (Historia Gotfridi) by two anonymous German authors (Anonymi Rhenani) covers the First Crusade and the period from 1106-1191. It is derivative of the works of Bartolf of Nangis, Robert the Monk, Jacques de Vitry and Oliver of Paderborn, and was published in 1141. In regard to Godfrey's title it states:

They wished to exalt the state of Jerusalem and the whole region of Judea. And when he was brought to the block of the marble column, which, as I saw, is shown in the Temple of Dominic's Sepulchre, to be crowned King of Jerusalem by Dambert the Patriarch, Gotfrid himself knowing that the King of Heaven, the Lord Jesus, sat on this block, when he was crowned with thorns by Pilate in the praetor therefore he himself, considering himself entirely unworthy of the crown, as has been said, and therefore not king, but protector of his country, humbly desired to be named.

Nevertheless, there is no direct evidence that the title of advocate of the Holy Sepulchre was ever adopted by Godfrey himself.

=== Later kings as Advocate ===
The successors of Godfrey were also sometimes referred to as advocate or defender in addition to king. Some examples include:

- Albert of Aachen uses the phrase rege ac defensor in describing kings of Jerusalem after Baldwin I's death.
- Regesta Regni Hierosolymitani shows the following entry dated 1104: Balduinus rex Iudee et Iherusalem ac defensor sanctissimi Sepulchri domini nostri Ihesu Christi (Baldwin, king of Judea and Jerusalem and defender of the Holy Sepulcher of our Lord Jesus Christ)
- Walter the Chancellor wrote Bella Antiochena (Wars of Antioch) and described Baldwin II of Jerusalem as: Rex qui solus post Dominum dominus et defensor Christanitatis (the king who alone after the Lord is lord and defender of Christianity)
- Anselm of Canterbury in his S. Anselmi Cantuariensis Archiepiscopi Opera Omnia wrote to Baldwin II that he should behave towards the church as an advocatus et defensor.

Writing later, William of Tyre referred to Amalric I of Jerusalem, king from 1173–1174, as follows: rex Ierosolimorum, loco rum penerabilium dominice passionis et resurrectionis defensor et advocatus.

== Treatment in later histories ==
The title of Godfrey of Bouillon has been treated in different ways by both the later historians of the Crusades as well as the modern historians. The first among these is English churchman and historian Thomas Fuller in his The Historie of the Holy Warre (1639).

Eight days after Jerusalem was won, they proceeded to the election of a king; but they had so much choice that they had no choice at all; so many princes there were, and so equally eminent, that justice herself must suspend her verdict, not knowing which of them best deserved the crown. Yet it was their Measure to pitch on Robert the Norman as on the man of highest descent,... but he who would not take the crown with the cross... They go on to a second choice... and unanimously chose [Godfrey of Bouillon] their king. He accepted the place, but refused the solemnity thereof, and would not wear a crown of gold there, where the Saviour of mankind had worn a crown of thorns.

French Jesuit and historian Louis Maimbourg wrote one of the earliest comprehensive histories of the Crusades in Histoire des Croisades pour la délivrance de la Terre Sainte (1675), This was translated by English historian John Nalson called The History of the Crusade, or the Expeditions of the Christian Princes, for the Conquest of the Holy Land (1684). Nalson's translation of Maimbourg's account states:

[S]oon as he had pronounced the Name of Godfrey, all the whole Assembly Interrupted him, crying out with the same Mind and Voice, Godfrey, Godfrey, long Live Godfrey the most puissant and pious King of Jerusalem... The very same day he was Conducted to the Church of the Holy Sepulchre, and there Proclaimed King... He was there presented with a Crown of Gold, which he absolute∣ly refused, protesting that he would never wear a Crown of Gold in a City where the King of Kings, had for the Sake of Mankind worn a Crown of Thorns. And so he would not take upon himself the Title of King.

English historian Edward Gibbon wrote his monumental History of the Decline and Fall of the Roman Empire (1776–1789) which were later excerpted into The Crusades, A.D. 1095–1261 (1869). He had this to say about the election of Godfrey of Bouillon to the leadership of Jerusalem:

Eight days after this memorable event which pope Urban did not live to hear, the Latin chiefs proceeded to the election of a king... [T]he unanimous voice of the army, proclaimed Godfrey of Bouillon the first and most worthy of the champions of Christendom. His magnanimty accepted a trust as full of danger as of glory; but in a city where his Saviour had been crowned with thorns, the devout pilgrim rejected the name and ensigns of royalty; and the founder of the kingdom of Jerusalem contented himself with the modest title of Defender and Baron of the Holy Sepulchre.

French Crusades historian Joseph François Michaud wrote his Histoire des Croisades in 3 volumes (1812–1822), which was translated by William Robson as History of the Crusades (1875). Concerning the election of Godfrey of Bouillon, Michaud wrote (in translation):

At length the electors... proclaimed the name of Godfrey. This nomination caused the most lively joy throughout the Christian army, and was considered as an inspiration of heaven. By the authority given to him, Godfrey became the depositary of the dearest interests of the Crusaders. Every one among them had in some sort confided his own glory to him, by leaving him the care of watching over and guiding their conquests. They conducted him in triumph to the church of the Holy Sepulchre, where he took the oath to respect the laws of honour and justice. He refused the diadem and the insignia of royalty, saying that he would never accept a crown of gold in a city in which the Saviour of the world had been crowned with thorns. He contented himself with the modest title of defender and baron of the Holy Sepulchre.

English historian Charles Mills wrote the seminal work History of the Crusades for the Recovery and Possession of the Holy Land (1820) which was critical of earlier histories, particularly that of Gibbon. Mills relates the story of Godfrey of Bouillon as follows.

On the eighth day after the capture of the holy Foundation of the Latin city, the princes assembled for the august purpose of electing a monarch of the kingdom of Jerusalem. The deliberations were interrupted by several of the clergy.... The meddling priests confessed the propriety of electing a king but declared that precedence should accompany rank, and that as spiritual things were more worthy than those of a temporal nature, the choice of a patriarch should take place before that of a monarch. The princes treated this intrusion with contempt... The princes conducted him in religious and stately order to the church which covered the tomb of Christ; but he refused to wear a diadem in a city where his Saviour had worn a crown of thorns; and modestly avowed, that the honour of becoming the defender and advocate of the Holy Sepulchre was all that he aspired to.

Belgian archaeologist Alexis Guillaume Charles Prosper Hody wrote a number of books on the history and tomb of Godfrey of Bouillon, including Godefroid de Bouillon et les rois latins de Jérusalem: étude historique sur leurs tombeaux jadis existant dans l'église de la Rescurrection (1859).

Godefroid de Bouillon never received and never bore the title of king; he called himself "by the grace of God, confessor" of the church of the Holy Sepulcher, gratiâ Dei, ecclesiœ Sancti "Sepulcri nunc advocatus," in the famous epistle addressed to the Holy Father and to all Christendom, after the battle of Ascalon and the return of the main Crusaders to their respective countries. Baudouin, brother of Godefroid of Bouillon, on the contrary had himself consecrated, and took, in a crowd of acts that have been preserved for us, the title of first roi of Jerusalem. Thus, we read in the letters patent erecting the church of Bethlehem as a cathedral: The very spring worthy of God (duke Godefrid) the governor of the holy city, having completed the first year of his reign, "at the mercy of God he rested in peace on the third day following."

German historian Bernhard von Kugler wrote in his Geschichte der Kreuzzüge (1880):

The clergymen in the army demanded that not a secular lord but a patriarch should be set over Jerusalem and thus a new church state. The princes opposed this, but were unsure who they should make ruler of the holy city. The richest among them and the leader of the strongest army was Count Raimund. They offered him the crown, but he refused... Finally the princes resolved to raise the Duke of Lorraine from the throne. They did not, however, appoint him King of Jerusalem, but only Protector of the Holy Sepulcher, it seems, because the Duke himself was in humility after the more modest title required. Thus, on July 22, 1099, Gottfried von Bouillon became the first Christian ruler in liberated Jerusalem and thereby received the position that founded his immortal fame.

English soldier, explorer and antiquarian C. R. Conder is mostly known for his archaeological works of the Holy Land. He also wrote a history called The Latin Kingdom of Jerusalem (1897) the described the events surrounding the election of Godfrey of Bouillon as:

Robert of Flanders spoke as a true knight before the Council, asking his peers to lay aside ambition and envy, and to choose from among themselves the best and strongest, the wisest and most just. His loyal words pointed to Godfrey only, and all men rejoiced when the choice was made, and the honour fell to him whose due it was. They led him in solemn procession to the Sepulchre, with psalms and hymns; but here he put away the crown, because a crown of thorns alone had pressed the brows of Christ; and known henceforth only as duke and vassal of the Church, he took upon his shoulders the weight of anxious rule.

The German historian Reinhold Röhricht laid much of the foundation of modern Crusade research. His seminal work on the Crusades was Geschichte der Kreuzzüge im Umriss (1898) where he wrote of Godfrey of Bouillon:

The question of who should actually be master of the holy city, which had already been raised before the capture, was discussed again at a princely assembly (July 22nd); the clergy demanded the election of a clergyman, but this was flatly refused. Count Raymund was proposed as the richest lord of the Christian army, but he declined with the well-known statement that he did not want to wear a golden crown in Jerusalem, where the Savior bled under a crown of thorns, but in truth because the murdered Jerusalem and the deserted surroundings did not seem desirable to him, or because he focused his attention on the northern coastal area. Gottfried was now elected, but he did not accept the title of king, so as not to be surpassed in Christian humility by Raymund, but always called himself duke, prince, protector of the holy grave, undoubtedly worthy of such an award; for he "was happier in word and deed and purer in faith and heart than all the rest".

Heinrich Hagenmeyer was a German historian who specialized in original sources and texts from the beginning of the Crusades. His Chronologie de la première croisade 1094–1100 (1902) provides the most detailed chronology of the First Crusade and immediate aftermath, indexed to source information. He writes:

1099, vendredi 22 juillet. -- Élection de Godefroi de Bouillon comme défenseur du Saint-Sépulcre et prince de la Ville-Sainte. (Election of Godefroi de Bouillon as defender of the Holy Sepulcher and prince of the Ville-Sainte.)

American historian Dana Carleton Munro wrote in his A History of the Middle Ages (1902):

After conquering Jerusalem the crusaders elected Godfrey “Baron and Defender of the Holy Sepulcher.”

Belgian historian Charles Moeller wrote in his Godefroid de Bouillon et Godefroid de Bouillon et l'Avouerie du Saint-Sépulcre (1908):

Instead of being awarded the royal crown, the newly elected lent to one of the ceremonies which, in feudal law, had the force of a legal commitment. He was solemnly led to the Holy Sepulchre; there he bowed his forehead on the stone of the tomb, and, by this symbolic gesture, dedicated himself to the perpetual service of the Church, identified with this emblematic relic. The Holy Sepulchre, for deliverance from which so much heroism had been deployed, this tomb empty,... now had his defender. Such is the genesis of the advocate of the Holy Sepulchre (Avouerie du Saint-Sépulcre).

Louis R. Bréhier writing in the article Crusades published in the Catholic Encyclopedia (1908):

...the knights chose as lord of the new conquest Godfrey of Bouillon, who called himself "Defender of the Holy Sepulchre".

Ernest Barker writing in the article Crusades published in the 11th edition of the Encyclopædia Britannica (1911):

...and Godfrey accordingly became—not king, but “advocate of the Holy Sepulchre,”

Anglo-Irish historian J. B. Bury was editor-in-chief of The Cambridge Medieval History (1911–1936). Volume 5: Contest of Empire and Papacy (1926) includes a chapter entitled The First Crusade. The discussion on Godfrey of Bouillon includes the following:

Finally, Godfrey of Bouillon, rather unwillingly, accepted the distinguished and difficult post, and thus became Defender of the Holy Sepulchre (Advocatus Sancti Sepitlcri). He was always addressed as dux or princeps, never as king. But his successors were crowned as kings, and so he may be called the first ruler of the Latin kingdom of Jerusalem.

French medievalist and Byzantinist Ferdinand Chalandon wrote his Histoire de la Première Croisade jusqu'à l'élection de Godefroi de Bouillon (1925) where he described the election of Godfrey of Bouillon citing Gesta Francorum and Raymond of Aguilers as sources:

Le vendredi 22 juillet 1099, huit jours après la prise de la ville sainte, Godefroi de Bouillon était élu défenseur du Saint-Sépulcre, et il semblait qu'une ère nouvelle et de longue durée allait s'ou- vrir pour la Syrie et la Palestine sous la domination occidentale. [On Friday, July 22, 1099, eight days after the capture of the holy city, Godfrey of Bouillon was elected defender of the Holy Sepulchre, and it seemed that a new and long-lasting era was about to begin for Syria and the Palestine under Western rule.]

American historian John L. La Monte wrote Feudal Monarchy in the Latin Kingdom of Jerusalem, 1100–1291 (1932). There it is described:

But Godfrey was not the first king of Jerusalem, for he refused to accept the title and crown, contenting himself with the title of Baron and Defender of the Holy Sepulchre. The probable reason for this was that Godfrey recognized the Pope's claim to Jerusalem as a state of the Church, and not as has been often said because he would not wear a crown of gold where his Savior had worn a crown of thorns. [Footnote: The legend of the ‘crown of thorns' motif had taken root early. Ludolph von Suchem (Descriptio Terrae Sanctae) in 1350 wrote that Godfrey and Baldwin had made a rule that no king of Jerusalem should ever wear a golden crown but should wear instead a crown of thorns...]

American historian John Andressohn wrote the biography The Ancestry and Life of Godfrey of Bouillon (1947) and described the election and title of Godfrey of Bouillon as follows:, pgs. 105–106, Chapter VI: Godfrey as Head of Jerusalem

Godfrey humbled himself by taking the title of “Advocate of the Holy Sepulcher,” rather than king. He is variously designated as prince, duke, and advocate; this latter title his brother Baldwin spurned when after Godfrey's death he took over the rule of the Holy Land. It is quite possible that the argument that where Christ had worn a crown of thorns none should wear the regal crown was reiterated at the time of the election. However, he was king in fact, if not in name, and later writers as well as contemporary documents nearly always designate him as king. [Note 7: The chroniclers are not precise as to the title given Godfrey. Fulcher 307 speaks of him as princeps patriae; Gesta 478 calls him princeps civitatis; Entry No. 29 in Röhricht, Regesta regni Hierosolymitani, has the title protector S. Sepulchri. D. C. Munro, The Kingdom of the Crusaders, 59, states that his official title was Godefridus dux gratia ecclesiae S. Sepulcri nunc advocatus.]

British historian Stephen Runciman wrote his A History of the Crusades in three volumes (1951–1954). In the first, Volume One: The First Crusade and the Foundation of the Kingdom of Jerusalem (1951), he writes:

[Raymond] announced that he would not wish to be king in Christ's holy city, hoping thus to make it impossible for anyone else to become king. The electors then turned with relief to Godfrey, who was known to be favoured by Robert of Flanders and Robert of Normandy. Godfrey, after some show of unwillingness, accepted the power but asked to be excused from wearing the title of a king. He would be called Advocatus Sancti Sepulchri, the dedicated defender of the Holy Sepulchre. [Note 2. Raymond of Aguilers, XX, pg. 301, reporting Raymond's refusal of the crown. Gesta Francorum, X. 39, pgs. 206–208, saying that Godfrey was elected princeps civitatis for the purpose of fighting against the Saracens. Fulcher of Chartres, I.XXX, I, using the title of princeps. For Godfrey's title of Advocatus, see Moeller, Godefroid de Bouillon et l'Avouerie du Saint-Sépulcre.]

American historian Kenneth M. Setton was the general editor of the comprehensive Wisconsin Collaborative History of the Crusades published in six volumes (1969–1989). The first volume was The First One Hundred Years (1969) and included Chapter X. The First Crusade: Antioch to Ascalon, written by Runciman. In it is described:

The crown was first offered to Raymond; but he refused it, probably because he thought the offer did not command general support. He declared that he would not wish to be king in Christ's earthly kingdom, hoping no doubt to prevent anyone else from accepting the kingship. The electors then turned to Godfrey, who was known to be favoured by the two Roberts. He accepted the post of prince for the purpose of fighting the "infidel" Godfrey, and while likewise refusing a royal title, he decided to be called Advocatus Sancti Sepulchri, the dedicated defender of the Holy Sepulchre, a title which gave him secular authority but did not prejudice the rights of the church.

British historian John France wrote the following in his Victory in the East: A military history of the First Crusade (1994). France is also the author of an in-depth study on the election and title of Godfrey of Bouillon.

Some of the clergy demanded that the Patriarch be elected first in recognition of the primacy of the spiritual authority, but the princes refused to hear that and offered the throne to Count Raymond who, probably under clerical influence, refused, disdaining the name of king of Jerusalem. Godfrey de Bouillon was then offered the government of the city as "Advocate," a position which recognized the claims of the church while conceding practical power to the lay authority.

British historian Jonathan Riley-Smith wrote numerous works on the Crusades and, in particular, a study of the title of Godfrey of Bouillon. Based on that study, he generally referred to Godfrey as simply the ruler of Jerusalem. For example, as editor-in-chief of The Oxford Illustrated History of the Crusades (2001), he compiled a chronology that included:

1099: 22 July. Godfrey of Bouillon elected first Latin ruler of Jerusalem.

British historian Thomas Asbridge has written a number of works on the Crusades including The First Crusade: A New History (2004) in which he discusses the election of Godfrey of Bouillon as follows:

The right to rule the Holy City now became the focus of this friction. Raymond of Toulouse, once the crusade's prospective leader, had lost so much support because of the débâcle at Arqa and his continued patronage of the widely discredited Holy Lance that he was now eclipsed by Godfrey of Bouillon. Having played an instrumental role in the capture of Jerusalem, Godfrey could in some sense claim right of conquest. But the clergy continued to resist the idea that this most sacred of cities might be ruled by a secular king. Yet, in the absence of the late Greek patriarch Simeon, only recently deceased, the Church had no obvious candidate to promote. On 22 July a compromise was reached: Godfrey was elected ruler, but rather than styling himself as outright king, he adopted the less assertive title of ‘Advocate of the Holy Sepulchre’, implying a position of protector, subordinate to the Church.

In Asbridge's later work, The Crusades: The War for the Holy Land (2012), he writes:

Raymond of Toulouse eyed the position of Latin king, but his popularity had been waning since Arqa and, on 22 July 1099, Godfrey of Bouillon, chief architect of the crusades' victory, took up the reins of power. In a gesture of conciliation to the clergy he accepted the title of "Advocate of the Holy Sepulchre," implying that he would merely act as Jerusalem's protector. [Footnote: Historians continue to debate the precise nature of Godfrey's title. He may well also have employed the appellation "prince," but it is relatively certain that he did not style himself as "king of Jerusalem."]

British historian Christopher Tyerman has written extensively on the Crusades, including God's War: A New History of the Crusades (2006) in which he describes the election of Godfrey in the following terms:

The settlement of secular and ecclesiastical authority within the city [of Jerusalem] and its surrounds resurrected the simmering hostilities between the leaders. On 22 July, Raymond of Toulouse was once more outmanoeuvred. After apparently refusing an offer to accept the crown of Jerusalem, perhaps on clerical prompting, he saw instead his latest chief rival, Godfrey of Bouillon, the only other main leader willing to remain in the east, elected as secular ruler, or Advocate (the title implying ecclesiastical authority).

The Crusades—An Encyclopedia (2006) was edited by British historian Alan V. Murray who also authored studies on the title of Godfrey of Bouillon. In the former, the article on Godfrey of Bouillon states:

On 22 July. Godfrey was chosen as ruler of Jerusalem by the leading members of the crusade in preference to Raymond of Saint-Gilles, count of Toulouse. To forestall objections by Raymond and others that it was sacrilegious for a king to be crowned in the city where Christ had worn a Crown of Thorns, Godfrey declined to adopt a royal title, taking that of prince (Lat. princeps) and defender of the Holy Sepulchre (Lat. advocatus Sancti Sepulchri).

The Routledge Companion to the Crusades was written by British historian Peter Lock and states:

[Godfrey] was elected the first Latin ruler of Jerusalem on 22 July 1099, but refused to be crowned as such preferring instead the title of advocate (avoué) or protector of the Holy Sepulchre.

With the exception of Jonathan Riley-Smith, modern historians refer to Godfrey of Bouillon as advocate of defender of the Holy Sepulchre.

== Bibliography ==
Versions of the original sources referenced frequently herein all appear in the Recueil des historiens des croisades (RHC). Editions that are used are consistent with those in Murray's The Crusader Kingdom of Jerusalem: A Dynastic History 1099-1125. Some relevant passages are also quoted in Krey's The First Crusade: The Accounts of Eyewitnesses and Participants.

- Albert of Aachen (1879). Historia Hierosolymitanae. RHC Occ 4.III.
- Andressohn, John (1947). The Ancestry and Life of Godfrey of Bouillon. Indiana University publications. Social science series, no.5. Indiana University Press.
- Anonymi Rhenani (1895). Historia et Gesta Ducis Gotfridi seu historia de desidione Terræ sanctæ. RHC Occ 5.X.
- Anonymous (1866). Tudebodus imitatus et continuatus. RHC Occ 3.III.
- Asbridge, Thomas (2004). The First Crusade: A New History. Oxford University Press. ISBN 9780195178234.
- Asbridge, Thomas (2012). The Crusades: The War for the Holy Land. Simon & Schuster. ISBN 9781849836883.
- Baldric of Dol (1879). Historiae Hierosolymitanae. RHC Occ 4.I.
- Colvin, Mary Noyes (1893). Godeffroy of Boloyne, or the Siege and Conqueste of Jerusalem, by William, archbishop of Tyre. Early English text society. Extra series. No. LXIV. London: Pub. for the Early English Text Society by K. Paul, Trench, Trübner.
- Dajani-Shakeel, Hadia (1993). "Diplomatic Relations Between Muslim and Frankish Rulers 1097–1153 A.D.". Crusaders and Muslims in Twelfth-Century Syria. In, Crusaders and Muslims in Twelfth-Century Syria. pp. 190–215. doi:10.1163/9789004477513_013. ISBN 9789004477513.
- Dawes, Elizabeth A. (1928). Anna Comnena: The Alexiad. Medieval Sourcebook, Fordham University.
- Du Cange, Charles (1678). Glossarium ad scriptores mediae et infimae latinitatis. Editio nova locupletior et auctior, Parisiis.
- France, John (1983). "The Election and Title of Godfrey de Bouillon". Canadian Journal of History. 18 (3). Canadian Journal of History, 18:3: 321–330. doi:10.3138/cjh.18.3.321.
- France, John (1994). Victory in the East: A Military History of the First Crusade. Cambridge University Press. ISBN 9780521589871.
- Fuller, Thomas (1840). The Historie of the Holy Warre. London, W. Pickering.
- Gesta Francorum (1866). Gesta Francorum et aliorum Hierosolimitanorum. RHC Occ 3.VI.
- Guibert of Nogent (1879). Historia quae dicitur Gesta Dei per Francos. RHC Occ 4.II.
- Hagenmeyer, Heinrich (1890). Anonymi gesta Francorum et aliorum Hierosolymitanorum. Heidelberg: C. Winter.
- Hagenmeyer, Heinrich (1896). Galterii cancellarii Bella antiochena. Innsbruck: Verlag der Wagner'schen universitäts-buchhandlung, RHC Occ 5.III.
- Hagenmeyer, Heinrich (1901). Die Kreuzzugsbriefe Aus Den Jahren 1088-1100. Innsbruck.
- Hagenmeyer, Heinrich (1902). Chronologie de la première croisade, 1094–1100. E. Leroux, Paris.
- Hagenmeyer, Heinrich (1913). Fulcheri Carnotensis Historia Hierosolymitana (1095-1127). Heidelberg: C. Winter.
- Hamilton, Bernard (1980). The Latin Church in the Crusader States: The Secular Church. Variorum Publications. ISBN 9780860780724.
- Hody, Alexis (1859). Godefroid de Bouillon et les rois latins de Jérusalem: étude historique sur leurs tombeaux jadis existant dans l'église de la Rescurrection. Paris, H. Casterman.
- Huygens, R. B. C. (1986). Guillaume de Tyr: Chronique. Corpus Christianorum. Continuatio Mediaevalis; 63-63A. ISBN 9782503030005.
- John, Simon (2018). Godfrey of Bouillon. Taylor & Francis Group. ISBN 978-1472458964.
- Krey, August C. (1921). The First Crusade: The Accounts of Eyewitnesses and Participants. Princeton University Press.
- La Monte, John L. (1932). Feudal Monarchy in the Latin Kingdom of Jerusalem, 1100–1291. Monographs of the Medieval academy of America, no. 4. Medieval Academy of America.
- Laurence of Liège (1140). Gesta episcoporum Virdunensium et abbatum sancti Vitoni. Monumenta Germaniae Historica Scriptores (MGH SS) 10:504.
- Lock, Peter (2006). The Routledge Companion to the Crusades. Routledge. doi:10.4324/9780203389638. ISBN 0-415-39312-4.
- Madden, Thomas F. (2013). The Concise History of the Crusades. Rowman & Littlefield. ISBN 9781442215764.
- Maimbourg, Louis (1677). Histoire des Croisades pour la délivrance de la Terre Sainte. Paris, S. Mabre-Cramoisy.
- Moeller, Charles (1908). Godefroid de Bouillon et l'Avouerie du Saint-Sépulcre. Mélanges Godfried Kurth, vol I, Liége.
- Murray, Alan V. (1990). The Title of Godfrey of Bouillon as Ruler of Jerusalem. Collegium Medievale 3.
- Murray, Alan V. (1998). From Clermont to Jerusalem: The Crusades and Crusader Societies 1095-1500. International Medieval Research. Vol. 3. Brepols Publishers. doi:10.1484/M.IMR-EB.6.09070802050003050006060708. ISBN 9782503506678.
- Murray, Alan V. (2000). The Crusader Kingdom of Jerusalem: A Dynastic History, 1099–1125. University of Oxford. ISBN 9781900934039.
- Murray, Alan V. (2006). The Crusades—An Encyclopedia. ABC-CLIO. ISBN 9781576078624.
- Murray, Alan V. (2019). The Franks in Outremer: Studies in the Latin Principalities of Palestine and Syria, 1099-1187. Taylor & Francis Group. ISBN 9780367880798.
- Nalson, John (1685). The History of the Crusade, or the Expeditions of the Christian Princes, for the Conquest of the Holy Land. London: Printed by R. H. for Thomas Dring.
- Peter Tudebode (1866). Petri Tudebodi seu Tudebodis sacerdotes Sivraceusis historia de Hierosolymitano itinere. RHC Occ 3.I, II.
- Prawer, Joshua (1972). The Crusaders' Kingdom. Phoenix Press. ISBN 978-1-84212-224-2.
- Prawer, Joshua (1980). Crusader Institutions. Oxford University Press. ISBN 978-0198225362.
- Raymond of Aguilers (1968). Historia Francorum qui ceperunt Iherusalem. Medieval Sourcebook, Fordham University.
- Riley-Smith, Jonathan (1979). The Title of Godfrey of Bouillon. Bulletin of the Institute of Historical Research 52.
- Riley-Smith, Jonathan (1998). The First Crusaders, 1095–1131. Cambridge. ISBN 9780521646031.
- Riley-Smith, Jonathan (2001). The Oxford Illustrated History of the Crusades. Oxford University Press. ISBN 9780192854285.
- Riley-Smith, Jonathan (2014). The Crusades: A History. Bloomsbury Publishing. ISBN 9781472508799.
- Robert the Monk (1866). Historia Hierosolymitana. RHC Occ 3.IX.
- Robson, William (1855). The Great Sieges of History. Routledge.
- Röhricht, Reinhold (1893). Regesta regni Hierosolymitani (MXCVII-MCCXCI). Oeniponti, Libraria Academica Wageriana.
- Röhricht, Reinhold (1904). Regesta regni Hierosolymitani (MXCVII-MCCXCI): Additamentum. Oeniponti, Libraria Academica Wageriana.
- Runciman, Steven (1951). A History of the Crusades, Volume One: The First Crusade and the Foundation of the Kingdom of Jerusalem. Cambridge University Press. ISBN 9780521061612.
- Schmitt, Franz Sales (1938). S. Anselmi Cantuariensis Archiepiscopi Opera Omnia. Stuttgart: Friedrich Fromann Verlag. ISBN 9789333186346.
- Setton, Kenneth M. (1969). A History of the Crusades. University of Wisconsin Press.
- Skinner, Patricia (2010). Challenging the Boundaries of Medieval History. Brepols Turnhout, Belgium. ISBN 9782503523590.
- Stevenson, William Barron (1907). Crusaders in the East. Cambridge University Press. ISBN 9780790559735.
- Tyerman, Christopher (2006). God's War: A New History of the Crusades. Belknap Press. ISBN 978-0-674-02387-1.
- Tyerman, Christopher (2009). The Crusades: A Brief Insight. Sterling Press. ISBN 9780192806550.
- Tyerman, Christopher (2011). The Debate on the Crusades, 1099–2010. Manchester University Press. ISBN 978-0-7190-7320-5.
- Tyerman, Christopher (2019). The World of the Crusades. Yale University Press. ISBN 978-0-300-21739-1.
- von Sybel, Heinrich (1861). The History and Literature of the Crusades. G. Routledge & Son, Limited.
- William of Malmesbury (1847). William of Malmesbury's Chronicle of the kings of England from the earliest period to the reign of King Stephen. London : H.G. Bohn.
- William of Tyre (1844). "Chronique, Historia rerum in partibus transmarinis gestarum". Historiens Occidentaux. RHC Occ 1, First Part: 5 volumes.
- Yewdale, Ralph Bailey (1917). Bohemond I, Prince of Antioch. Princeton University.
