= Norman Hook =

Norman Hook may refer to:

- Norman Hook (priest)
- Norman Hook (bowls)
