= Thomas Bullock =

Thomas Bullock may refer to:

- Thomas Bullock (Mormon) (1816–1885), English Mormon pioneer, clerk and historian of the Church of Jesus Christ of Latter-day Saints
- Thomas Bullock (priest) (1694–1760), Anglican dean
- Thomas Lowndes Bullock (1845–1915), English author, colonial administrator, academic and sinologist
- Thomas Bullock, British musician, former member of A.R.E. Weapons
