= James Nasmith =

British clergyman, academic and antiquarian

James Nasmith (1740–1808) was an English clergyman, academic and antiquary.

== Life ==
The son of a carrier who came from Scotland, and plied between Norwich and London, he was born at Norwich late in 1740. He was sent by his father to Amsterdam for a year to complete his school education, and entered in 1760 Corpus Christi College, Cambridge, where he graduated B.A. 1764, M.A. 1767, and D.D. 1797. In 1765 he was elected to a fellowship in his college, he acted for some time as its sub-tutor, and in 1771 he was the junior proctor of the university. Having been ordained in the English church, he served for some years as the minister of the sequestrated benefice of Hinxton, Cambridgeshire.

He was nominated by his college in 1773 to the rectory of St Mary Abchurch with St Laurence Pountney, London, but before he could be instituted he exchanged for the rectory of Snailwell, Cambridgeshire. When the headship of his college became vacant in 1778; but he declined the offer of it, and was promoted by Bishop James Yorke in 1796 to the rectory of Leverington, in the Isle of Ely.

As magistrate for Cambridgeshire and chairman for many years of the sessions at Cambridge and Ely, he studied the Poor Laws and other economic questions affecting his district. He was also for some time chaplain to John Hobart, 2nd Earl of Buckinghamshire. After a long illness he died at Leverington on 16 October 1808, aged 67, and was buried in the church, where his widow erected a monument to his memory on the north side of the chancel. He had married in 1774 Susanna, daughter of John Salmon, rector of Shelton, Norfolk, and sister of Benjamin Salmon, fellow of his college. She died at Norwich on 11 November 1814, aged 75, bequeathing sums to charity.

== Works ==
Nasmith devoted his leisure to antiquarian research, and he was elected Fellow of the Society of Antiquaries on 30 November 1769. He was occupied in arranging and cataloguing the manuscripts which Archbishop Matthew Parker gave to his college. The catalogue was finished in February 1775, and presented by him to the Master and Fellows, who directed that it should be printed under his direction, and that the profits of the sale should be given to him.

Nasmith edited:

- Catalogus librorum manuscriptorum quos collegio Corporis Christi in Acad. Cantabrigiensi legavit Matthæus Parker, archiepiscopus Cantuariensis, 1777.
- Itineraria Symonis Simeonis et Willelmi de Worcestre, quibus accedit tractatus de Metro, 1778.
- Notitia Monastica, or an Account of all the Abbies, Priories, and Houses of Friers formerly in England and Wales, by Thomas Tanner. Additions consisted mainly of references to books and manuscripts. Many copies of this edition were destroyed by fire on 8 February 1808.

Nasmith was also author of:

- The Duties of Overseers of the Poor and the Sufficiency of the present system of Poor Laws considered. A charge to the Grand Jury at Ely Quarter Sessions, 2 April. With remarks on a late publication on the Poor Laws by Robert Saunders, 1799.
- An Examination of the Statutes now in force relating to the Assize of Bread, 1800.

Saunders, a critic from Lewisham of corruption in the oversight of the existing Poor Law system, replied to these pamphlets in An Abstract of Observations on the Poor Laws, with a Reply to the Remarks of the Rev. James Nasmith, 1802. He is felt to have got the better of the debate.

The assistance of Nasmith is acknowledged in the preface to Henry Swinden's History of Great Yarmouth, which was edited by John Ives in 1772.

== Notes ==
Attribution

This article incorporates text from a publication now in the public domain: "Nasmith, James". Dictionary of National Biography. London: Smith, Elder & Co. 1885–1900.
