= Henry Swinden =

Henry Swinden (1716–1772) was an English antiquary, known for his history of Great Yarmouth, Norfolk. He worked as a schoolmaster and then land-surveyor.

== Works ==
Swinden became a close friend of John Ives, who supported him over 20 years in collecting material for History and Antiquities of the Ancient Burgh of Great Yarmouth, Norwich, 1772. The work was brought out by Ives for the benefit of Swinden's widow; he also erected a mural tablet in St. Nicholas Church, Yarmouth, to Swinden's memory. Swinden associated with Thomas Martin of Palgrave, as Ives did; he acknowledged help with his work from James Nasmith. It drew on earlier work of Henry Manship, and was abridged in the Norfolk history of Charles Parkin.

Swinden had published in 1763 a broadsheet showing all the officers of Yarmouth at the time, with other topographical information; it was reprinted in 1863. A map or plan of the town by him was also published in 1779.

== Notes ==
Attribution

This article incorporates text from a publication now in the public domain: Lee, Sidney, ed. (1898). "Swinden, Henry". Dictionary of National Biography. Vol. 55. London: Smith, Elder & Co.
