= Thomas Tanner (bishop) =

English bishop (1674–1735)

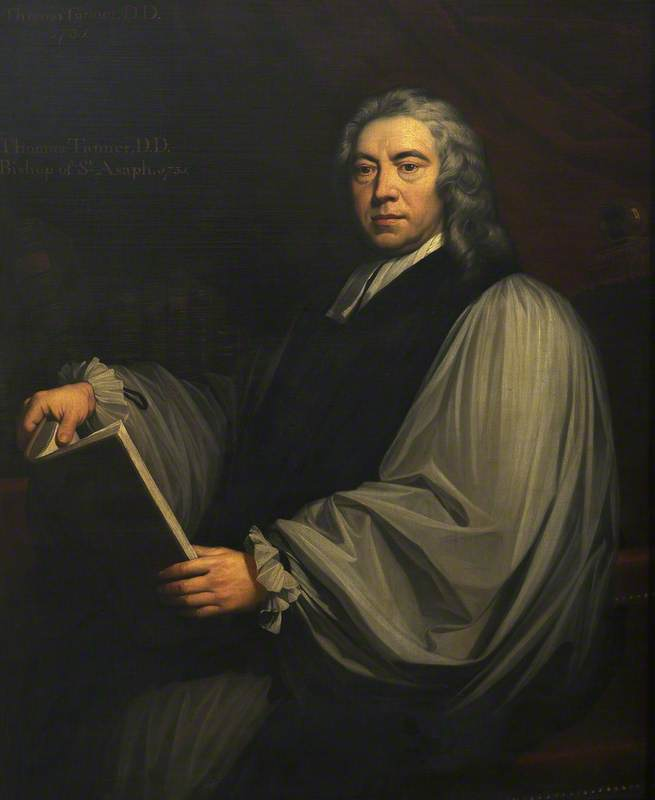
Bishop Tanner, 1731

Thomas Tanner (24 January 1674 – 14 December 1735) was an English antiquary and prelate. He was Bishop of St Asaph from 1732 to 1735.

== Life ==
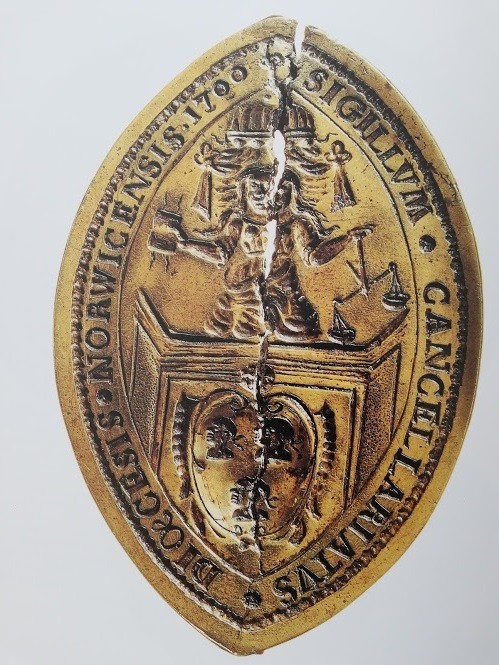
Seal of Thomas Tanner as Chancellor of the Diocese of Norwich (1700)

Tanner was born at Market Lavington in Wiltshire, and was educated at The Queen's College, Oxford, taking holy orders in 1694. The following year, he became chaplain and then fellow of All Souls', Oxford, and a few years later private chaplain to John Moore, bishop of Norwich, and afterwards bishop of Ely, who appointed him chancellor of the diocese of Norwich. He lived in Norfolk from 1701 until 1731. In 1706 he became rector of Thorpe, near Norwich, in 1713 a canon of Ely Cathedral, and in 1724 a canon of Christ Church, Oxford.

On 23 January 1732 he was appointed Bishop of St Asaph and thereafter divided his time between London, Oxford and North Wales. He died in Oxford at the age of 61.

== Works ==
Tanner's chief work published during his lifetime is the Notitia Monastica, a short account of all the religious houses in England and Wales. This was published at Oxford in 1695; it was reprinted with additions by the author's brother, John Tanner, in 1744; and was reprinted again with further additions by James Nasmith in 1787. He also wrote Bibliotheca Britannico-Hibernica, a dictionary of all the authors who flourished in England, Scotland and Ireland before the opening of the 17th century, at which he laboured for forty years. This was eventually completed by David Wilkins and published in 1748, thirteen years after the author's death. Tanner also collected materials for a history of Wiltshire and worked for some time on a new edition of the works of John Leland.

== Collections ==
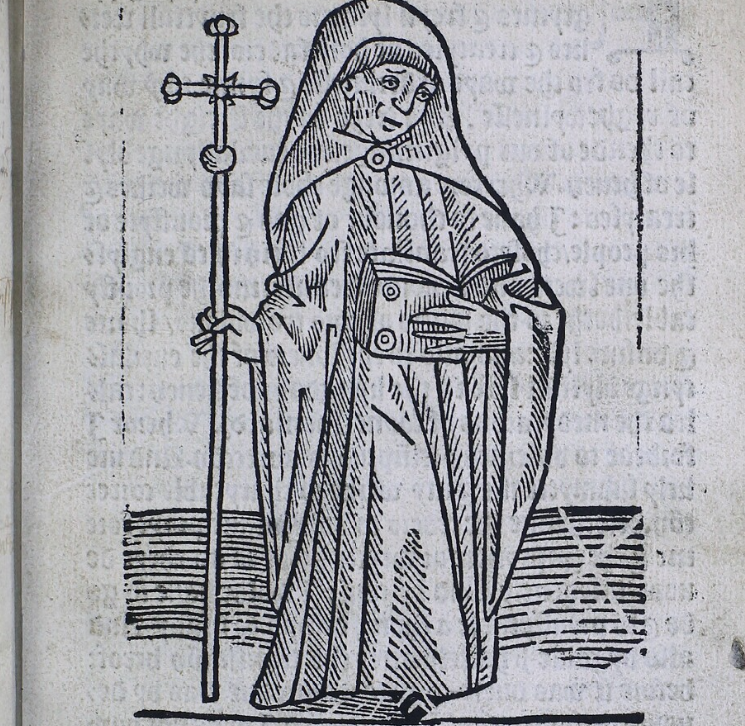
Detail from Tanner's copy of Bernardus Claravallensis' Meditationes de interiori homine

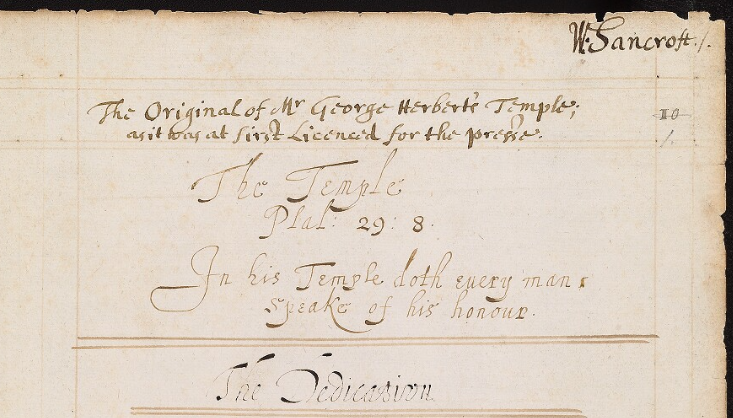
Page from Tanner's copy of 'The Temple', previously owned by Archbishop Sancroft

When Tanner moved from Norwich to Oxford, his books were conveyed by water but the barge sank at Benson Lock, near Wallingford on 11 December 1731 and they were submerged for twenty hours with lasting effects. Most works were uniformly bound (c.1820) but none of the fly-leaves, possibly annotated by Tanner, survived.

Tanner died in 1735, bequeathing to the Bodleian his English historical papers, 17th century correspondence, manuscripts, and printed books not already held by the library. His collection of books (c.960 volumes) date from the 15th to the 18th centuries and include examples of English 15th and 16th century printing, theological works by Reformers and opponents, and Civil War and Interregnum pamphlets.

The printed books had been collected for Tanner's work on the Bibliotheca, helped by his association with John Moore, the Bishop of Norwich and a book-collector in his own right. His manuscripts, on the other hand, had more diverse origins and contents. Tanner was already interested in autograph letters, but in 1718 bought a significant number of papers held by the historian and pamphleteer John Nalson. Then in 1724 he bought most of Archbishop Sancroft's papers, numbering c. 300/467 volumes of Tanner's manuscripts.

Partly thanks to the presence of these Sancroft papers, Tanner's collection was quickly made available and used once it had been received by the Bodleian in 1736. In 1738, the manuscripts were ordered and sent out for binding. However, Richard Rawlinson consulted the collection from 1736 to 1739, before any catalogue of Tanner's manuscripts had been made publicly available – though Tanner's listing of some of the papers came with the collection. Tanner's contribution to the Bodleian's collection of 20,000 charters and rolls was also one of the most significant. In 1741 Thomas Toynbee (then an undergraduate at Balliol) was paid to catalogue the Tanner manuscripts (later followed by Alfred Hackman in 1860). In August 1744 the first order for one was recorded in the Library's entry-books. The printed books were not catalogued at the same rate, and the first order for a Tanner book came from Rawlinson in October 1750, and the first orders designated by shelf-mark date from 1755.

== Family ==
Tanner married three times. His first wife, whom he married in 1701, was Rose Moore, eldest daughter of Bishop Moore. She died on 15 March 1706, aged 25 (having had issue Dorothy, died 17 February 1704, aged 14 months), and was buried on the south side of the bishop's chapel in Norwich Cathedral, under a white marble tablet with an inscription to her memory. According to Hearne, she was "a short squabb dame", who was "remarkable for drinking of brandy", and Tanner after marrying her was obliged to abandon for a time his studies, and was involved in lawsuits about his chancellorship. His second wife was Frances Preston, daughter of Jacob Preston, citizen of London, but of a gentleman's family in Norfolk. She died on 11 June 1718, aged 40, and was buried in the same chapel, with an inscription on white marble over her grave. The iron palisade door to this chapel was given by Tanner, and his arms, with those of his first two wives, are on it. Her issue consisted of two daughters, both of whom died young, and one son, Thomas Tanner, canon of Canterbury and rector of Hadleigh and Monk's Eleigh, Suffolk, who married in January 1743 Mary Potter, third daughter of Archbishop Potter, and died on 11 March 1786. When John Loveday visited Tanner in July 1732, his house was kept by his sister, "a widow lady", but he married in May 1733 as his third wife Elizabeth Scottowe of Thorpe by Norwich. She was an heiress, and married as her second husband Robert Britiffe, recorder of Norwich and M.P. for that city. She died on 1 May 1771, aged 77.

== Notes ==
Church of England titles
| Preceded by Robert Cannon | Archdeacon of Norfolk; 1721–1732 | Succeeded by John Baron |
| Preceded by Francis Hare | Bishop of St Asaph; 1732–1735 | Succeeded by Isaac Maddox |
