= Graham Smith (priest) =

Graham Charles Morell Smith (born 7 November 1947) is a priest in the Church of England.

Smith was educated at Whitgift School and Durham University. He was ordained in 1977 and began his ministry as a curate at All Saints', Tooting Graveney. Following this he was vicar of St Paul's Thamesmead. He was also Rural Dean of Oxford and then rector of Leeds Parish Church, a position he held until his appointment as Dean of Norwich. Smith retired from this position on 29 September 2013.

Church of England titles
Preceded by Stephen George Platten	Dean of Norwich; 2004–2013	Succeeded by Jane Hedges
