= Stephen Platten =

British Anglican prelate (born 1947)

The Right Reverend Stephen Platten FSA BD
- Bishop of Wakefield
- Church: Church of England
- Diocese: Diocese of Wakefield
- In office: 2003 – 2014 (See dissolved)
- Predecessor: Nigel McCulloch
- Other posts: Dean of Norwich (1995 – 2003); Rector of St Michael, Cornhill (2014 – 2016); Honorary Assistant Bishop (July 2014 – present)

Orders
- Ordination: 1975
- Consecration: 1 May 2003

Personal details
- Born: 17 May 1947 (age 79) Southgate, London
- Denomination: Anglican
- Parents: George Henry Platten & Marjory née Sheward
- Spouse: Rosslie Thompson
- Children: 2 sons: Aidan and Gregory
- Education: Institute of Education, London Trinity College, Oxford

Member of the House of Lords
- Lord Spiritual
- Bishop of Wakefield; 22 June 2009 – 20 April 2014

Stephen George Platten FSA (born 17 May 1947), is a retired Anglican prelate, the last to serve as diocesan Bishop of Wakefield in the Church of England.

Consecrated as a bishop on 19 July 2003, he was installed at Wakefield Cathedral on 19 July 2003. Platten previously served as Dean of Norwich from 1995.

== Early life and education ==
Platten was educated at the Stationers' Company's School, later graduating with a Bachelor of Education (BEd) degree from the Institute of Education and a Postgraduate Diploma (PGDip) in Theology from Cuddesdon College. He then pursued further religious studies at Trinity College, Oxford, receiving a Bachelor of Divinity (BD) degree.

Bishop Platten was awarded an Honorary Doctorate of Letters (Hon DLitt) from UEA in 2003 and an Hon. DUniv from the University of Huddersfield in 2012.

== Ordained ministry ==
Arms of the Bishop of Wakefield

Platten was ordained a deacon in 1975 and entered the priesthood in 1976 in the diocese of Oxford. He served as a Canon Residentiary of Portsmouth Cathedral and the diocese of Portsmouth's Director of Ordinands (1983–1990), then the Archbishop of Canterbury's Secretary for Ecumenical Affairs (1990–1995). A member of the Third Order of Saint Francis (TSSF), he served as the Minister Provincial of its European Province from 1991 to 1996.

Between 1990 and 1995, Platten was Guestmaster of the Nikaean Club, a Lambeth Palace dining club with a focus on ecumenical hospitality by the Archbishop of Canterbury.

Platten was introduced to the House of Lords on 22 June 2009, where he sat with fellow bishops as a Lord Spiritual.

On 3 November 2013 it was announced that the diocese of Wakefield, and therefore the episcopal see of Wakefield, would be dissolved on 20 April 2014. Then in July 2014, Bishop Platten was appointed Rector of St Michael's, Cornhill, London, as well as an Honorary Assistant Bishop in the Diocese of London. He stepped down from this rectory in 2016, retiring to live in Northumberland, and continues to serve as an Assistant Bishop in the dioceses of London, Southwark and Newcastle.

== Ministry in retirement ==
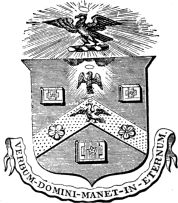
Stationers' arms

Between 2013 and 2020, Platten was Chairman of the Council of Hymns Ancient and Modern, Ltd, before serving as Master of the Worshipful Company of Stationers & Newspaper Makers for 2020/21. He was elected a Fellow of the Society of Antiquaries in 2020.

=== Views ===
Platten supports the ordination of women as priests and bishops.

On 11 February 2017, he was one of fourteen retired bishops to sign an open letter to the then-serving bishops of the Church of England. In an unprecedented move, they expressed their opposition to the House of Bishops' report to General Synod on sexuality, which recommended no change to the Church's canons or practices around sexuality. By 13 February, a serving bishop (Alan Wilson, Bishop of Buckingham) and nine further retired bishops had added their signatures; on 15 February, the report was rejected by Synod.

== Personal life ==
In 1972 Platten married Rosslie Thompson, whose work is devoted to children with special needs. They have two sons, Aidan and Gregory, both of whom have also been ordained in the Church of England.

Bishop Platten's homepage states that he "has particular interests in the study of theology and relations with other churches. He has recently been appointed as Chairman of the Church of England Liturgical Commission, which seeks to develop the worshipping life of the church."

It also states that his interests include reading, walking, Northumberland and music.

== Styles ==
- The Reverend Stephen Platten (1975–1983)
- The Reverend Canon Stephen Platten (1983–1995)
- The Very Reverend Stephen Platten (1995–2003)
- The Right Reverend Stephen Platten (2003–present)
  - Master Stationer Platten (2020/21)

== Writings ==
- Pilgrims. Fount, London. 1996.
- Augustine's Legacy. Darton, Longman and Todd. 1997.
- Pilgrim Guide to Norwich Cathedral. Norwich: Canterbury Press. 1998.
- Cathedrals and Abbeys of England. Norwich: Jarrold Publishing. 1999.
- Deacons in the Ministry of the Church. Church House Publishing. 1988. (with Mary Tanner)
- Spirit and Tradition: An Essay on Change (with George Pattison). Norwich: Canterbury Press. 1996.
- Vocation: Singing the Lord's Song in a Strange Land. London: SPCK. 2007.
- Rebuilding Jerusalem: The Church's hold on hearts and minds. London: SPCK. 2007.
- Animating Liturgy. Durham: Sacristy Press. 2017. ISBN 9781910519547.
- Borderlands. Wanney Books. 2017.
- Border Country. Wanney Books. 2019.
- Cathedrals of Britain. Pavilion Books. 2020. ISBN 9781841659152.
- Pilgrims: Pathways of Christian Life. Durham: Sacristy Press. 2020. ISBN 9781789591323.
- Berwick Barracks: A history and guide. Blackhall Publishing. 2020. ISBN 9781913369095.
- Wicked Weather for Walking: A Passiontide Progress. Durham: Sacristy Press. 2021. ISBN 9781789591910.
- Abbeys and Priories of England. Pitkin. 2022. ISBN 9781841659572.
- Northumberland: A Guide. Durham: Sacristy Press. 2022. ISBN 9781841659572.
- Off The Beaten Track - Northumberland: Twelve Tours of Hidden History. Stephen Platten & Ian Hall. Northern Heritage. 2024.
- County Durham: A Guide. Durham: Sacristy Press. 2026. ISBN 9781789594416.

Platten has also edited:

- Marriage, Helen Oppenheimer, Mowbray, London 1990
- Good for the Poor, Michael Taylor, Mowbray, London 1990
- Working with God, Andrew Stokes, Mowbray, London 1992
- The Ethics of I.V.F., Anthony Dyson, Mowbray, London 1995
- Dreaming Spires?: Cathedrals in a New Age, London, 2006
- Holy Ground: Cathedrals in the Twenty First Century. Sacristy Press. 2017.
- Oneness: The Dynamics of Monasticism. SCM Press. 2017.
- Austin Farrer for Today: A Prophetic Agenda (with Richard Harries). SCM Press. 2020.

He has edited and contributed to eight books:

- New Soundings, Darton, Longman and Todd 1997
- Flagships of the Spirit, Darton, Longman and Todd 1998
- Seeing Ourselves: Who are the Interpreters of Contemporary Society, Canterbury Press Norwich 1998
- The Retreat of the State: Nourishing the Soul of Society, Canterbury Press, Norwich 1999
- Ink and Spirit: Literature and Spirituality, Canterbury Press, Norwich 2000
- Open Government, Canterbury Press, Norwich 2000
- Runcie: On Reflection, Canterbury Press 2002
- Anglicanism and the Western Christian Tradition, Canterbury Press 2003
- Reinhold Niebuhr and Contemporary Politics: God and Power. Oxford University Press. 2010 (with Richard Harries)
- Comfortable Words: Polity, Piety and the Book of Common Prayer. SCM Press. 2012. (with Fr Christopher Woods).
- Austin Farrer: Oxford Warden, Scholar and Preacher. SCM Press.2020. (With Markus Bockmuehl).

Church of England titles
Preceded by Paul Burbridge	Dean of Norwich; 1995–2003	Succeeded by Graham Smith
Preceded by Nigel McCulloch	Bishop of Wakefield; 2003–2014	Diocese dissolved
