= Heinrich Hagenmeyer =

German historian (1834–1915)

Heinrich Hagenmeyer (1834–1915) was a German Protestant pastor and historian, specializing in writing and editing texts from the beginning of the Crusades. Closely associated with fellow German Reinhold Röhricht, their contribution to the history of the kingdom of Jerusalem set a sound archival footing for the discipline. In particular, Hagenmeyer's biography of Peter the Hermit, Peter der Eremite, established the basis for the study of the People's Crusade.

== Biography ==
Hagenmeyer was the son of a forester and studied theology in Heidelberg from 1852 to 1856. In 1859 he was appointed pastor and worked as such in Kälbertshausen. In 1866 he moved to Eberstadt and in 1871 to Großeicholzheim. From 1884 until his retirement he was pastor in Ziegelhausen.

Hagenmeyer published key critical editions of original sources for the First Crusade, such as the Historia Hierosolymitana of Fulcher of Chartres and the collection of letters composed by the Crusaders. HIs editions are still used by Crusades historians to this day. Hagenmeyer is regarded amongst the group of nineteenth-century historians who "set new scholarly standards in the discovery, appraisal and editing of old and new sources, thereby transforming both content and interpretation of the subject." For his contribution to Crusade research, he was awarded an honorary doctorate of philosophy by Heidelberg University.

== Works ==
The works of Heinrich Hagenmeyer include the following.

- Ekkehardi Uraugiensis abbatis Hierosolymita (1877). An edition of the Chronicon universale (World Chronicle) of Bavarian abbot Ekkehard of Aura.
- Peter der Eremite. Ein kritischer Beitrag zur Geschichte des ersten Kreuzzuges (1879). A critical contribution to the history of the First Crusade and the role of Peter the Hermit.
- Galterii Cancellarii Bella Antiochena. mit Erläuterungen und einem Anhange (1896). An edition of Bella Antiochena (Wars of Antioch) by Walter the Chancellor.
- Anonymi gesta Francorum et aliorum hierosolymitanorum (1890). An edition of the anonymous Gesta Francorum et aliorum Hierosolimitanorum written in 1100–1101.
- Epistulae et chartae ad historiam primi belli sacri spectantes, quae supersunt aevo aequales ac genuinae (1901). [A collection of letters and charters on the history of the First Crusade, 1088–1100].
- Die Kreuzzugsbriefe aus den Jahren 1088–1100 (1901). An alternate edition of Epistulae et chartae ad historiam primi belli sacri spectantes.
- Chronologie de la première croisade 1094–1100 (1902). A day-by-day account of the First Crusade, cross-referenced to original sources, with commentary.
- Chronologie de l'Histoire du Royaume de Jérusalem. Règne de Baudouin I (1101–1118) (1902). In Revue de l'Orient Latin (ROL), Volumes 9–12.
- Fulcheri Carnotensis Historia Hierosolymitana (1059–1127). Mit Erläuterungen und einem Anhange. (1913). An edition of the chronicle Gesta Francorum Iherusalem Perefrinantium by Fulcher of Chartres. With explanations and an appendix.
