= All Saints Church, Tooting =

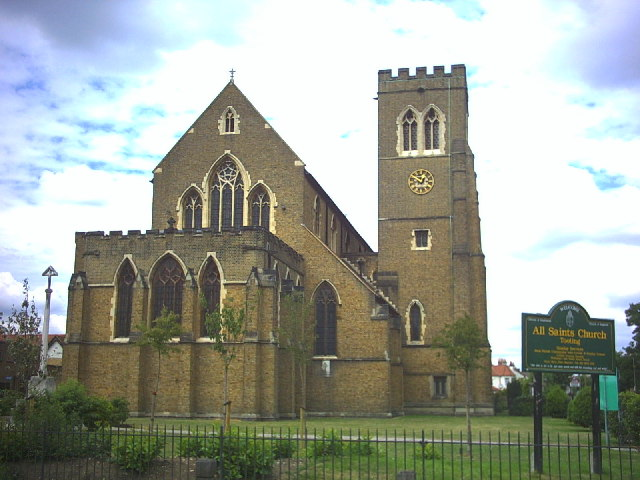
- All Saints Church, Tooting
- 51°25′50″N 0°09′26″W
- Location: Brudenell Road, Tooting, Greater London, SW17 8DF
- Country: England
- Denomination: Church of England

History
- Status: Active

Architecture
- Functional status: Parish church
- Heritage designation: Grade II listed
- Designated: 14 July 1955

Administration
- Diocese: Diocese of Southwark
- Archdeaconry: Archdeaconry of Wandsworth
- Deanery: Tooting
- Parish: All Saints, Tooting

Clergy
- Vicar: Revd Claire Whitmore

All Saints Church is a Church of England parish church in Tooting, Wandsworth, Greater London. The church was designed by Temple Moore and is a grade II listed building.

== History ==
Having been designed by Temple Moore, and funded by a bequest from Lady Augusta Brudenell-Bruce (in memory of her husband Lord Charles Brudenell-Bruce), the church was built between 1903 and 1906.

Due to a conflict between Temple Moore and the first incumbent, the interior decoration was overseen by Walter Tapper. The church was consecrated in 1907. It is Gothic Revival in style. The church consists of a nave with double aisles, a north tower, an aisled chancel, and an eastern Lady Chapel.

On 14 July 1955, the church was designated a grade II listed building.

The church is notable for its fine acoustic and outstanding three-manual Harrison & Harrison organ of 1906. In 2014 the organ was awarded Grade II* listing with the National Pipe Organ Register. The church also houses a fine chamber organ built by Osmond of Taunton, circa 1966 (owned by Ben Costello, but on long-term loan). There is also a Yamaha baby grand piano suitable for concert use. The Director of Music is Emma Howarth. Many significant recordings were made at the church during the 1980s and 1990s, including by opera singers Luciano Pavarotti, Dame Kiri te Kanawa and Plácido Domingo, and the album A Garland for Linda was recorded at All Saints in 1999.

=== Present day ===
The parish of All Saints, Tooting is part of the Archdeaconry of Wandsworth in the Diocese of Southwark.

== Notable people ==
- Nicholas Frayling, later Dean of Chichester, was vicar from 1974 to 1983
- Peter Maurice, later Bishop of Taunton, was vicar from 1996 to 2003
- Graham Smith, later Dean of Norwich, served his curacy here
- Christopher Pullin, Canon Chancellor of Hereford Cathedral, served his curacy here

== Gallery ==
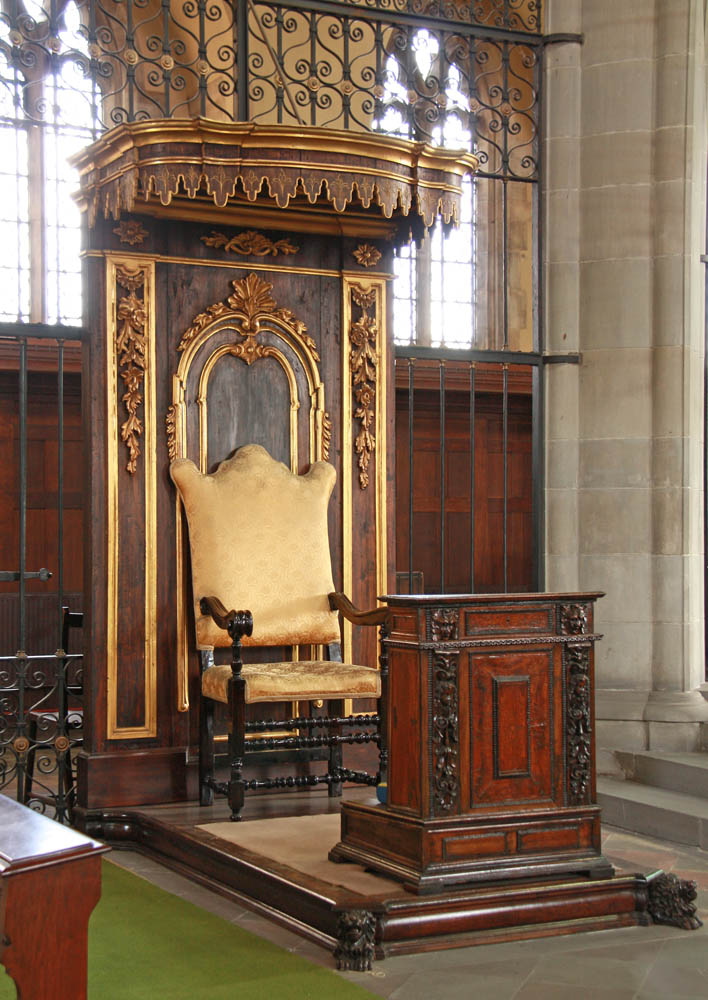
Cathedra

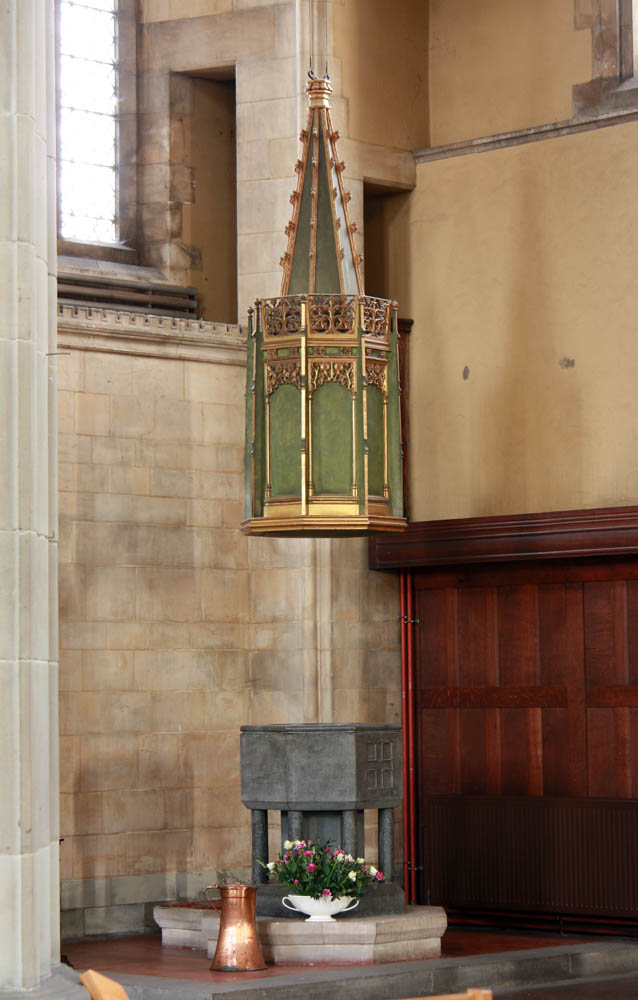
Baptismal font

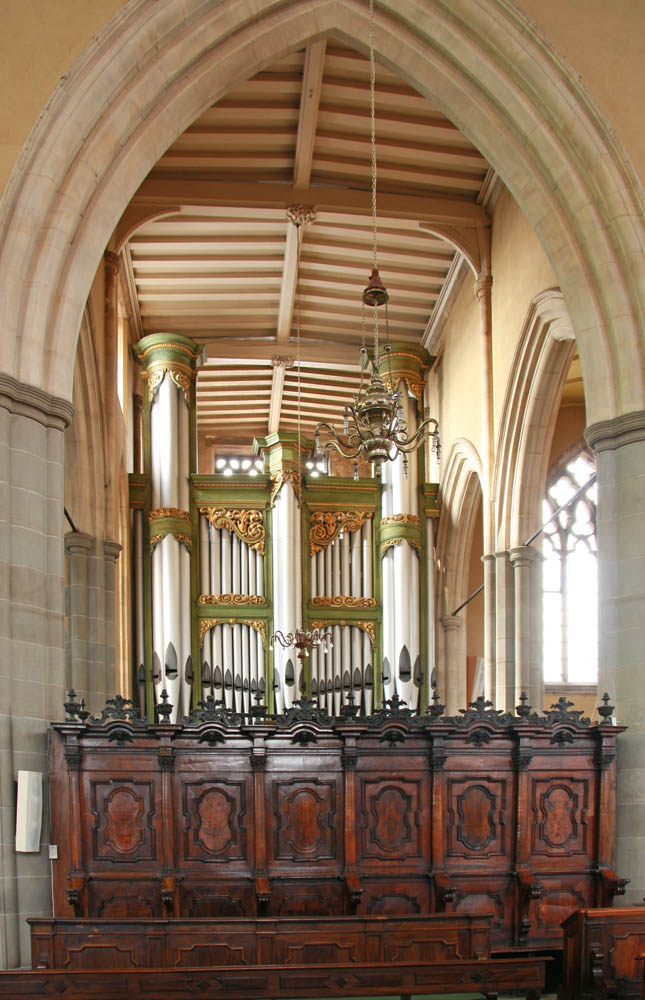
Organ

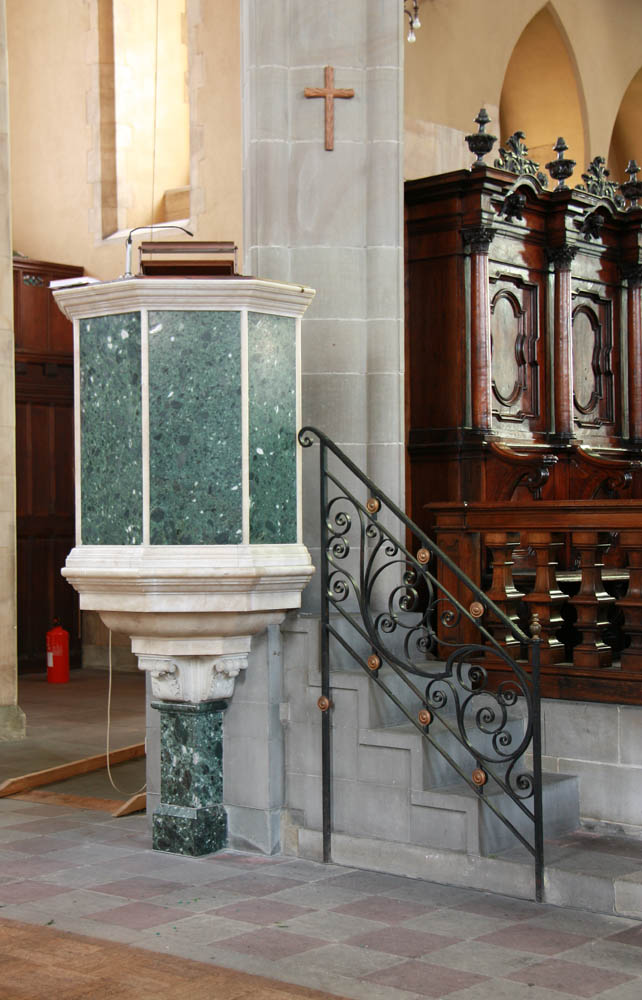
Pulpit

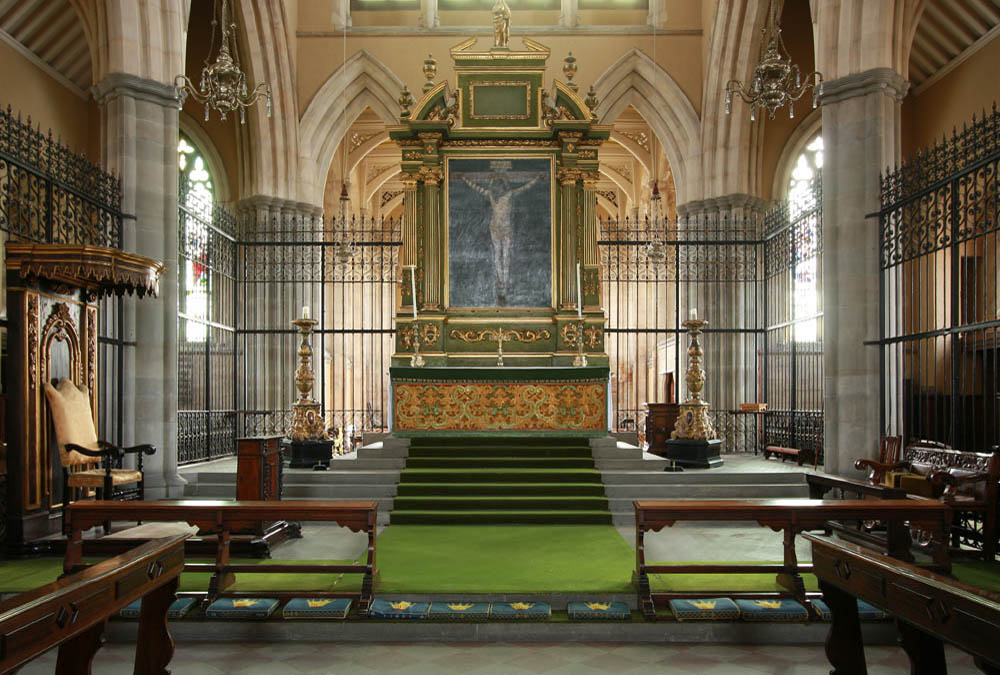
Altar

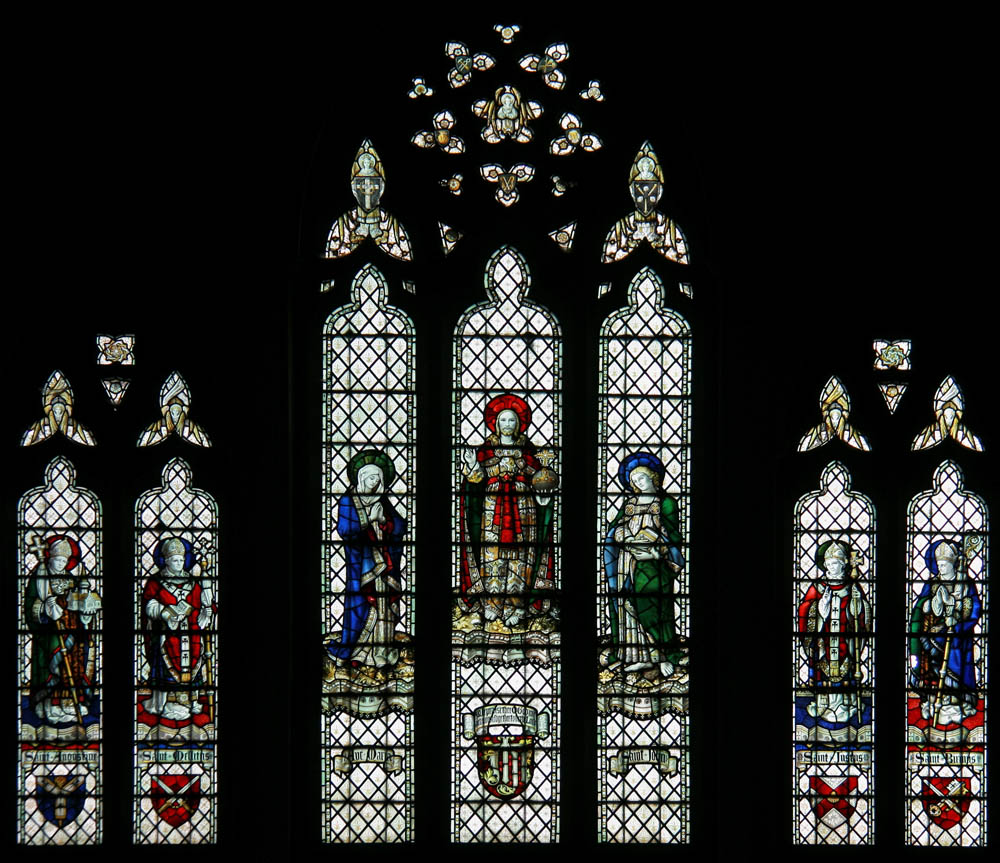
Stained glass

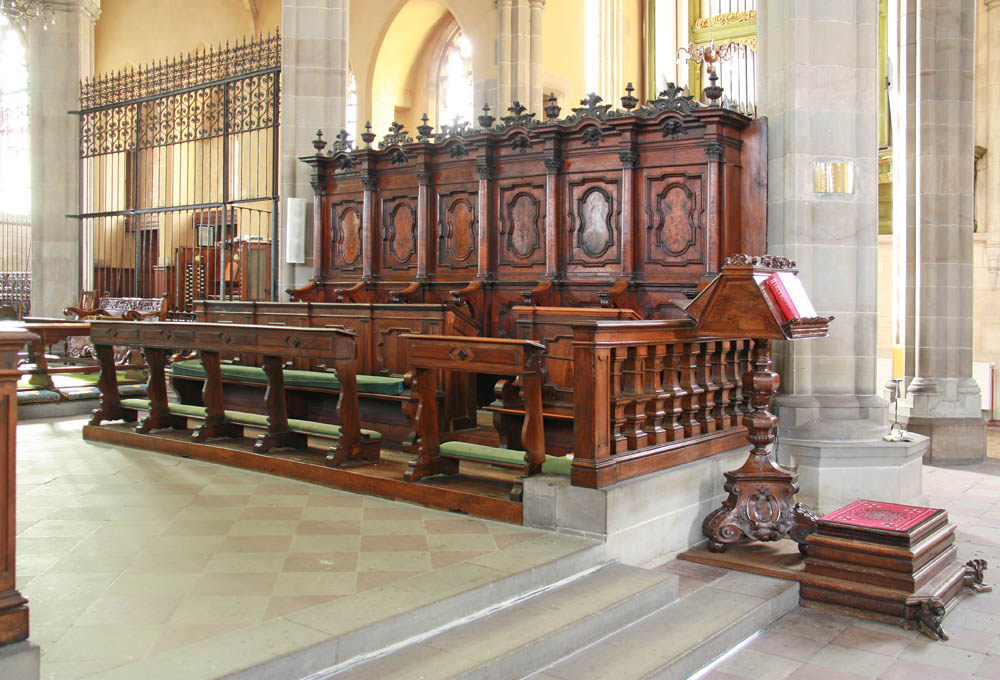
Choir stalls

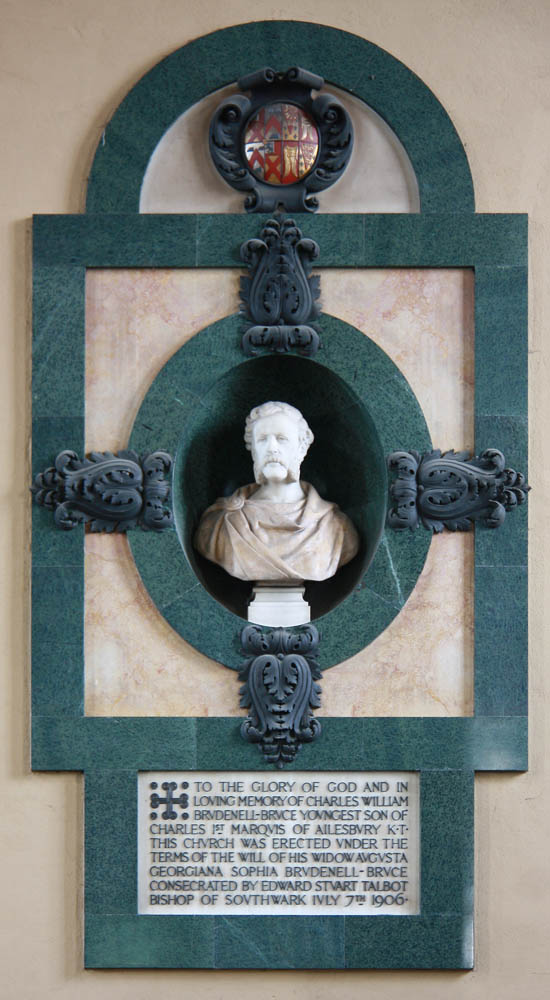
Wall monument
