= Dean of Norwich =

Head of the Chapter of Norwich Cathedral

Norwich cathedral

The Dean of Norwich is the head of the Chapter of Norwich Cathedral in Norwich, England. The current dean is Andrew Braddock, who took up the position in late January 2023.

== List of deans ==
=== Early modern ===
- 1538–1539 William Castleton (last prior)
- 1539–1554 John Salisbury (deprived)
- 1554–1557 John Christopherson (afterwards Bishop of Chichester, 1557)
- 1557–1558 John Boxall (also Dean of Windsor, 1557–59 and Dean of Peterborough, 1557–1559) (deprived)
- 1558–1559 John Harpsfield (also Archdeacon of London, 1554–1559) (deprived)
- 1560–1573 John Salisbury (restored)
- 1573–1589 George Gardiner
- 1589–1601 Thomas Dove (afterwards Bishop of Peterborough, 1601)
- 1601–1603 John Jegon (afterwards Bishop of Norwich, 1603)
- 1603–1614 George Montgomery (afterwards Bishop of Raphoe, 1605)
- 1614–1628 Edmund Suckling
- 1628–1654 John Hassal (deprived – Commonwealth)
- 1660–1670 John Crofts
- 1670–1681 Herbert Astley
- 1681–1689 John Sharp (afterwards Dean of Canterbury, 1689)
- 1689–1702 Henry Fairfax
- 1702–1714 Humphrey Prideaux
- 1724–1730 Thomas Cole
- 1731–1733 Robert Butts (afterwards Bishop of Norwich, 1733)
- 1733–1739 John Baron
- 1739–1761 Thomas Bullock
- 1761–1765 Hon. Edward Townshend
- 1765–1790 Philip Lloyd

=== Late modern ===
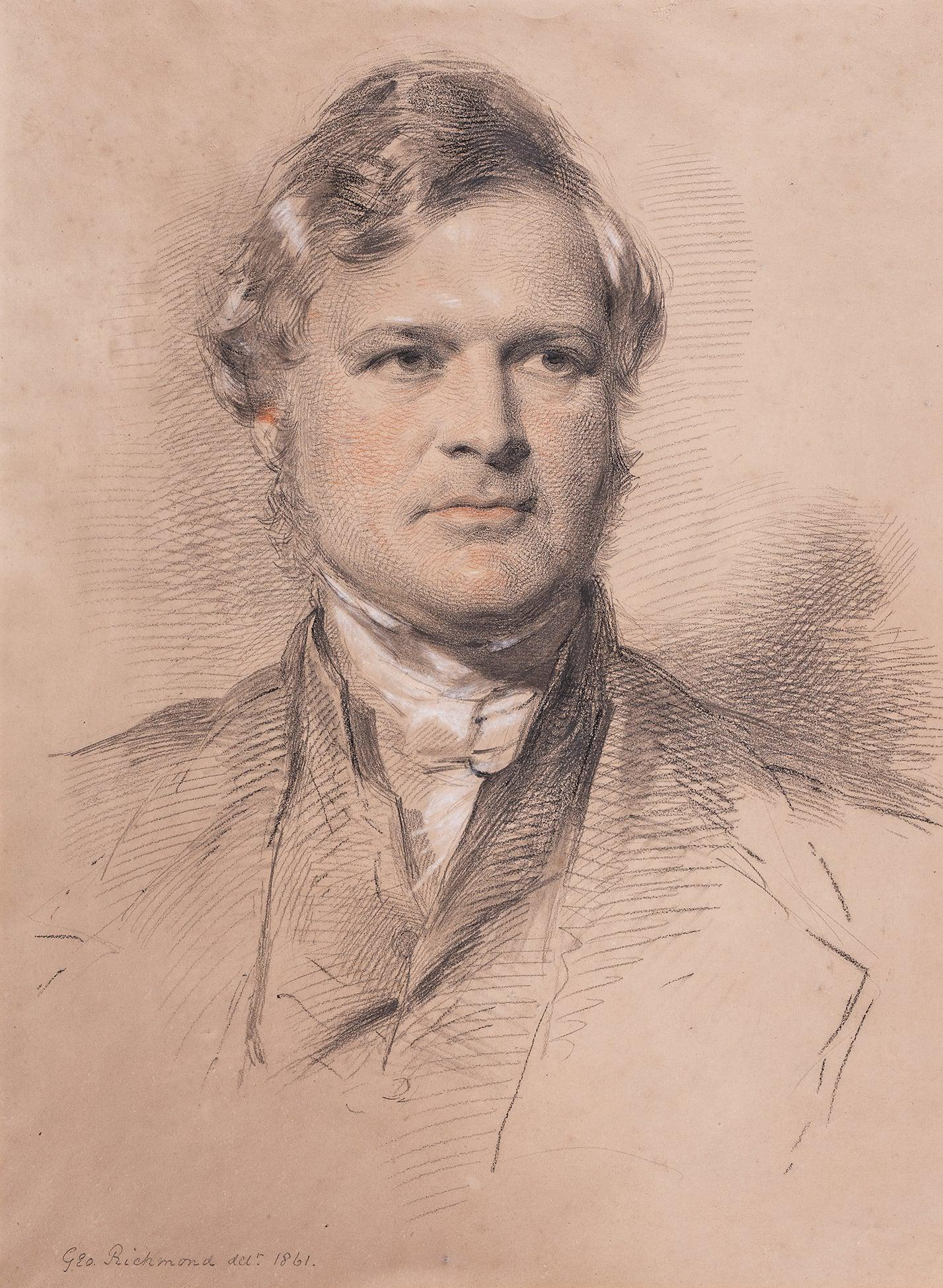
Edward Meyrick Goulburn (1861) by George Richmond

- 1790–1828 Joseph Turner
- 1828–1866 George Pellew
- 1866–1889 Meyrick Goulburn
- 1889–1909 William Lefroy
- 1909–1911 Henry Wakefield (afterwards Bishop of Birmingham, 1911)
- 1911–1919 Henry Beeching
- 1919–1927 John Willink
- 1927–1946 David Cranage
- 1946–1952 St Barbe Holland
- 1953–1969 Norman Hook
- 1970–1978 Alan Webster (afterwards Dean of St Paul's, 1978)
- 1978–1983 David Edwards (afterwards Provost of Southwark, 1983)
- 1983–1995 Paul Burbridge
- 1995–2003 Stephen Platten (afterwards Bishop of Wakefield, 2003)
- 2004–2013 Graham Smith
- 2014−2022 Jane Hedges
- 2023−present: Andrew Braddock

== Sources ==
- British History Online – An Essay towards a Topographical History of the County of Norfolk: Volume 3: The History of the City and County of Norwich, Part I – Deans of Norwich
- British History Online – Fasti Ecclesiae Anglicanae 1541–1857 – Deans of Norwich
