= A Garland for Linda =

Studio album by Various Artists
- Released: 25 April 2000
- Recorded: 10 August – 26 October 1999
- Studio: All Saints Church, London
- Genre: Choral music
- Length: 55:11
- Label: EMI
- Producer: John Fraser

Professional ratings
Review scores
Source	Rating
Allmusic	3/5 stars

A Garland for Linda is a tribute album for Linda McCartney, released in 2000 by the cancer-fighting organization the Garland Appeal. The album features choral music by ten contemporary composers including her husband Paul McCartney, John Rutter and John Tavener. It's performed by the Joyful Company of Singers, under the conductor Peter Broadbent.

== Track listing ==
1. "Silence and Music" (Ralph Vaughan Williams) – 4:50
  - From "A Garland for the Queen", commissioned in 1953 for the coronation of Queen Elizabeth II.
2. "Prayer for the Healing of the Sick" (John Tavener) – 8:53
  - From a text by Mother Thekla, found in the "Russian Orthodox Service of Holy Unction".
3. "Water Lilies" (Judith Bingham) – 7:35
  - Written in March 1999, drawing on the composer's experience of swimming.
4. "Musica Dei Donum" (John Rutter) – 5:36
  - From a solo chorus text of 1594.
5. "The Doorway of the Dawn" (David Matthews) – 4:53
  - Written about Linda's qualities and feelings.
6. "Nova" (Paul McCartney) – 6:28
  - Written between November 1998 and May 1999.
7. "I Dream'd" (Roxanna Panufnik) – 3:30
  - Arrangement for an acappella chorus.
8. "Farewell" (Michael Berkeley) – 3:30
  - From fragments of literary ideas by John Milton, William Shakespeare and Elizabeth Speller.
9. "The Flight of the Swan" (Giles Swayne) – 6:16
  - Inspired by the death of James Manson, son of a close friend of the author.
10. "A Good-Night" (Richard Rodney Bennett) – 2:51
  - From a poem by Francis Quarles.

== Personnel ==
The Joyful Company of Singers

- Claire Hills: soprano
- Katherine Willis: soprano
- Henrietta Hillman: alto
- Fiona Robinson: alto
- Lorna Youngs: alto
- Paul Zimmerman: tenor
- Alex Hayes: tenor
- Michael King: bass
- Greg Masters: bass
- Chris E. Williams: bass
- Peter Broadbent: conductor
