= Jane Hedges =

British priest

The Very Reverend Jane Hedges
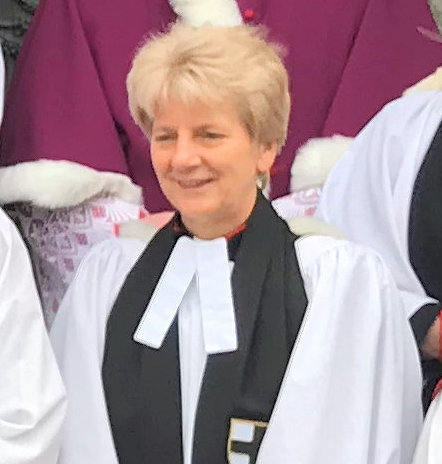
- Hedges in 2018
- Other posts: Canon Steward, Westminster Abbey (2006–2014); Archdeacon of Westminster (2006–2009 & 2010–2014); Dean of Norwich (2014–2022); Acting Dean of Canterbury (2022); Acting Dean of Newcastle (2023)

Orders
- Ordination: 1987 (deacon); 1994 (priest)

Personal details
- Born: 6 April 1956 (age 70)
- Denomination: Church of England
- Spouse: Chris Hedges
- Children: 2
- Education: Durham University

Jane Barbara Hedges (born 6 April 1956) is a British Anglican priest who served as Dean of Norwich from 2014 to 2022. Considered a "trailblazer for women in the priesthood", she was also acting Dean of Canterbury in 2022 and interim Dean of Newcastle in 2023.

== Early life and education ==
Hedges grew up in Hampshire and was educated at Sarisbury Secondary School, leaving at the age of 16. After a year of college, she began working as a junior bank clerk when she felt the call to ordination.

She continued her education with a general studies degree at the University of Durham, where she was a member of St John's College, Durham, graduating with a Bachelor of Arts (BA) degree in 1978. She trained for ministry at Cranmer Hall, Durham from 1978 to 1980.

== Career ==
Hedges felt called to the priesthood since the age of 17, a time when women were not allowed to become priests. She became a deaconess in 1980 and, as Church of England laws on the ministry of women evolved, her career progressed with her ordination as deacon in 1987 and as priest in 1994.

Hedges served as curate of the parish of Holy Trinity with St Columba in Fareham, Hampshire, from 1980 to 1983 and was a team vicar in Southampton from 1983 to 1988. In 1988 she became Stewardship Adviser in the Diocese of Portsmouth and in 1993 was appointed Canon Residentiary of Portsmouth Cathedral.

From 2001 she served in the team ministry of Honiton in the Diocese of Exeter, including as rural dean. In 2006 she became Canon Steward of Westminster Abbey and Archdeacon of Westminster. In 2013 she was appointed Sub-Dean of the Abbey. Her time there coincided with many notable events, including the wedding of Prince William and Catherine Middleton, the state visit of Pope Benedict XVI and a memorial service for Nelson Mandela at which Desmond Tutu preached.

=== As Dean ===
Hedges's appointment as the Dean of Norwich was celebrated at a service held at Norwich Cathedral on 21 June 2014. She was the 39th Dean of Norwich and the first female Dean in the cathedral’s 900 year history. Despite speculation that she might become a bishop, Hedges continued in her role until in October 2021 she announced her intention to retire, effective 1 May 2022.

On 8 May 2022, it was announced that she had been appointed Canon Residentiary of Canterbury Cathedral, and from June to December 2022 she served as acting Dean of Canterbury. On 22 January 2023, she was appointed as interim Dean of Newcastle, a position she held until 14 October 2023.

== Family ==
Hedges is married to Chris Hedges, a teacher, and has two sons.

Church of England titles
Preceded by Graham Smith	Dean of Norwich; 2014–2022	Succeeded by Andrew Braddock
