= Thomas Cole (dean of Norwich) =

Thomas Cole was an Anglican priest in the eighteenth century. Cole was born in Shropshire and educated at King's College, Cambridge. He held livings at Newton, Wisbech, West Raynham and East Raynham. He was installed as Dean of Norwich in May 1724, and continued until his death on 6 February 1731.

== Notes ==
Church of England titles
Preceded by Humphrey Prideaux	Dean of Norwich; 1724–1731	Succeeded by Robert Butts
