= Louis Maimbourg =

French Jesuit and historian (1610–1686)

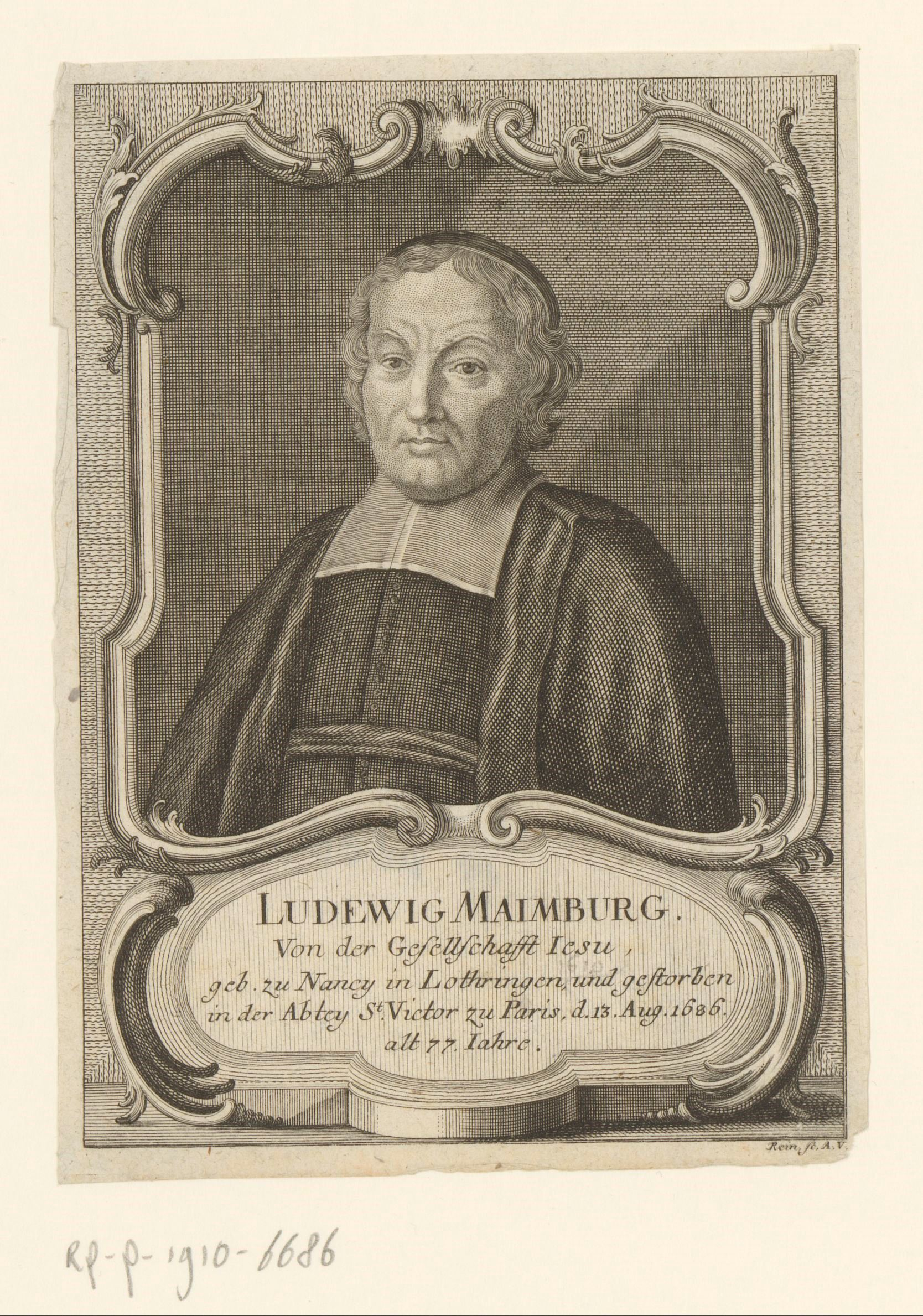
Louis Maimbourg

Louis Maimbourg (Latin: Ludovicus Mamburgus; January 10, 1610, Nancy – August 13, 1686, Paris) was a French Jesuit and historian.

== Biography ==
Born at Nancy, Maimbourg entered the Society of Jesus at the age of sixteen, and after studying at Rome became a classical master in the Jesuit college at Rouen. He afterwards devoted himself to preaching, but with only moderate success. After having taken some part in minor controversies he threw himself with energy into the dispute which had arisen as to the Gallican liberties; for his Traité historique de l'établissement et des prérogatives de l'Eglise de Rome et de ses évêques (1682) he was by command of Innocent XI expelled from the Society, but rewarded by Louis XIV with a residence at the abbey of St Victor, Paris, and a pension.

== Works ==
His numerous works include histories of Arianism, the iconoclast controversy, the Great Schism of 1054, Lutheranism, Anglicanism, Calvinism, and of the pontificates of Leo I and Gregory I. These works are compilations, written in a very lively and attractive style, but noted for their inaccuracies. His work on the Crusades, Histoire des Croisades pour la délivrance de la Terre Sainte (1675), was a populist and royalist history of the Crusades from 1195 to 1220, and is regarded as the first use of the term "crusade". It was translated into English in 1684 by historian John Nalson.His Histoire du calvinisme (1682) agitated French Catholics against French Protestants, provoking a ferocious response from Pierre Jurieu (1683) and a calm demolition of his historical method by Pierre Bayle in his Critique général de l’histoire du calvinisme de Maimbourg (1682).
