= Alan Webster (priest) =

English Anglican dean

The Very Reverend Alan Webster KCVO
- Dean of St Paul's
- Church: Church of England
- Diocese: Diocese of London
- In office: 1978 – 1987
- Predecessor: Martin Sullivan
- Successor: Eric Evans
- Other posts: Warden of Lincoln Theological College (1959–70); Dean of Norwich (1970–78)

Orders
- Ordination: 1942

Personal details
- Born: Alan Brunskill Webster; 1 July 1918
- Died: 3 September 2007 (aged 89)
- Denomination: Anglicanism
- Education: Shrewsbury School
- Alma mater: The Queen's College, Oxford

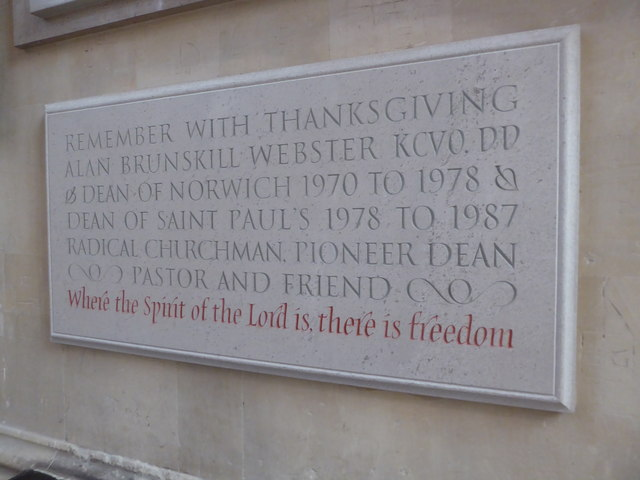
Memorial, Norwich Cathedral

Alan Brunskill Webster KCVO (1 July 1918 – 3 September 2007) was a British Anglican priest. He had a varied career, serving in parish roles, heading a theological college, and leading two cathedrals as their dean. As Dean of Norwich from 1970 to 1978, he modernised the cathedral and its services, and opened up its buildings to the public. He ended his ministry as Dean of St Paul's, between 1978 and 1987, during which the cathedral saw the Wedding of Charles and Diana, and the so-called 'Victory Service' following the Falklands War.

== Early life and education ==
Webster was born on 1 July 1918. His father, the Reverend John Webster, was the vicar of St Margaret's Church in Wrenbury, Cheshire, where he lived until 1935. He was educated at Shrewsbury School, then an all-boys public school in Shrewsbury, Shropshire. He studied at The Queen's College, Oxford, graduating with a Bachelor of Arts (BA) degree in 1939: as per tradition, his BA was promoted to a Master of Arts (MA Oxon) degree. He attended Westcott House, Cambridge for training for Holy Orders from 1941 to 1942, and was later awarded a Bachelor of Divinity (BD) by Queen's in 1954.

== Ordained ministry ==
Webster was ordained in 1942 and began his ordained ministry with curacies in Attercliffe and Arbourthorne. He was then chaplain and vice principal of Westcott House, Cambridge, and then the vicar of Barnard Castle. From 1959 to 1970, he served as Warden of Lincoln Theological College.

In 1970, Webster was appointed the Dean of Norwich. During his time leading Norwich Cathedral, he modernised and opened up the cathedral and its close to the public: he introduced a nave altar for the Alternative Service Book (1980) service of Holy Communion, toilets and an exhibition space within the cathedral building, and converting some of the cathedral's houses into a homeless shelter, an old peoples home and a study centre. He founded Norwich Night Shelter in 1973, and Cathedral Camps in 1981.

In 1978, he moved to the Diocese of London where he had been appointed Dean of St Paul's Cathedral. He organised and presided at the wedding service of Prince Charles and Lady Diana. He was in charge of the July 1982 'Victory Service' following the Falklands War, and attempted to include a Spanish-language translation of the Lord's Prayer into the service. He retired from full-time ministry in 1987 and was appointed Dean Emeritus.

His writings included Joshua Watson (1954), Broken Bones May Joy (1968), Julian of Norwich (1974) and Reaching for Reality (2002).

Webster died on 3 September 2007.

Church of England titles
Preceded by Norman Hook	Dean of Norwich; 1970– 1978	Succeeded by David Lawrence Edwards
Preceded by Martin Gloster Sullivan	Dean of St Paul's; 1978 – 1987	Succeeded by Thomas Eric Evans
