= Andrew Braddock (priest) =

British Anglican priest

The Very Reverend Dr Andrew Braddock
- Dean of Norwich
- Church: Church of England
- Diocese: Norwich
- In office: January 2023 – present
- Predecessor: Jane Hedges

Orders
- Ordination: 1998 (deacon); 1999 (priest)

Personal details
- Born: Andrew Jonathan Braddock; 25 March 1971 (age 55) Macclesfield
- Denomination: Anglicanism
- Education: Sidney Sussex College, Cambridge; Ridley Hall, Cambridge

Andrew Jonathan Braddock (born 25 March 1971) is a British Anglican priest. Since 2023, he has served as Dean of Norwich.

== Life and career ==
Braddock was born on 25 March 1971 in Macclesfield, and was educated at Stockport Grammar School, leaving the school in 1989. He studied at Sidney Sussex College, Cambridge, graduating in 1992, and was trained at Ridley Hall, Cambridge. He was ordained as a deacon in 1998 and as a priest in 1999, serving as a curate in the parishes of Ranworth with Panxworth, Woodbastwick, South Walsham, and Upton in the Diocese of Norwich. In 2001, he became Rector of Cringleford and Colney, and in 2004 took the additional role of Rural Dean of Humbleyard.

In 2008, he became Diocesan Missioner in the Diocese of Gloucester, becoming Canon Missioner of Gloucester Cathedral and Diocesan Director of Mission and Ministry in 2013. He was then made interim Dean of Gloucester in April 2022.

After his appointment as Dean of Norwich was announced on 6 September 2022, he was installed on 28 January 2023.

As well as serving as a priest, he has carried out academic work on the history of the Anglican church. In 2010, he published a book, The Role of the Book of Common Prayer in the Formation of Modern Anglican Church Identity: A Study of English Parochial Worship, 1750–1850. In 2013, he was awarded a PhD at the University of Cambridge, with a thesis examining the role of liturgy and worship in shaping the Church of England's identity during the late eighteenth and early nineteenth century. He was elected a Fellow of the Royal Historical Society (FRHistS) in 2023.

== Personal life ==
Braddock is married and has two children.

Church of England titles
Preceded by Jane Hedges	Dean of Norwich; 2023–	Incumbent
