= Bartolf of Nangis =

French historian

Bartolf of Nangis (fl. 1109) is the conventional name given to the author of the Gesta Francorum Iherusalem expugnantium, a history of the First Crusade.

The Gesta is known from seven manuscripts. It is an anonymous work. The author was first identified as Bartolf by Kaspar von Barth in the 17th century, who called him Bartolfus quidam peregrinus de Nangeio, "Bartolf a pilgrim from Nangis". He further argued, on the grounds of some Germanisms in the work, that he was a German. It may be that he was Flemish.

The Gesta draws heavily on the original, now-lost 1106 version of Fulcher of Chartres's Gesta Francorum Iherusalem peregrinantium (i.e. not the version we have today, extended to 1120s), making his chronicle particularly useful to scholars of Fulcher's work. He includes some original details, such as information on Bohemond's crusade to the Byzantine Empire, not attested in any other chronicles.

The first edition of the Gesta was published as an anonymous work by Jacques Bongars in 1611 based on two manuscripts. A few lines of verse found in Bongars' edition, and written before 1108, may have been composed by the same author (Bartolf).
