= Meyrick Goulburn =

English churchman (1818–1897)

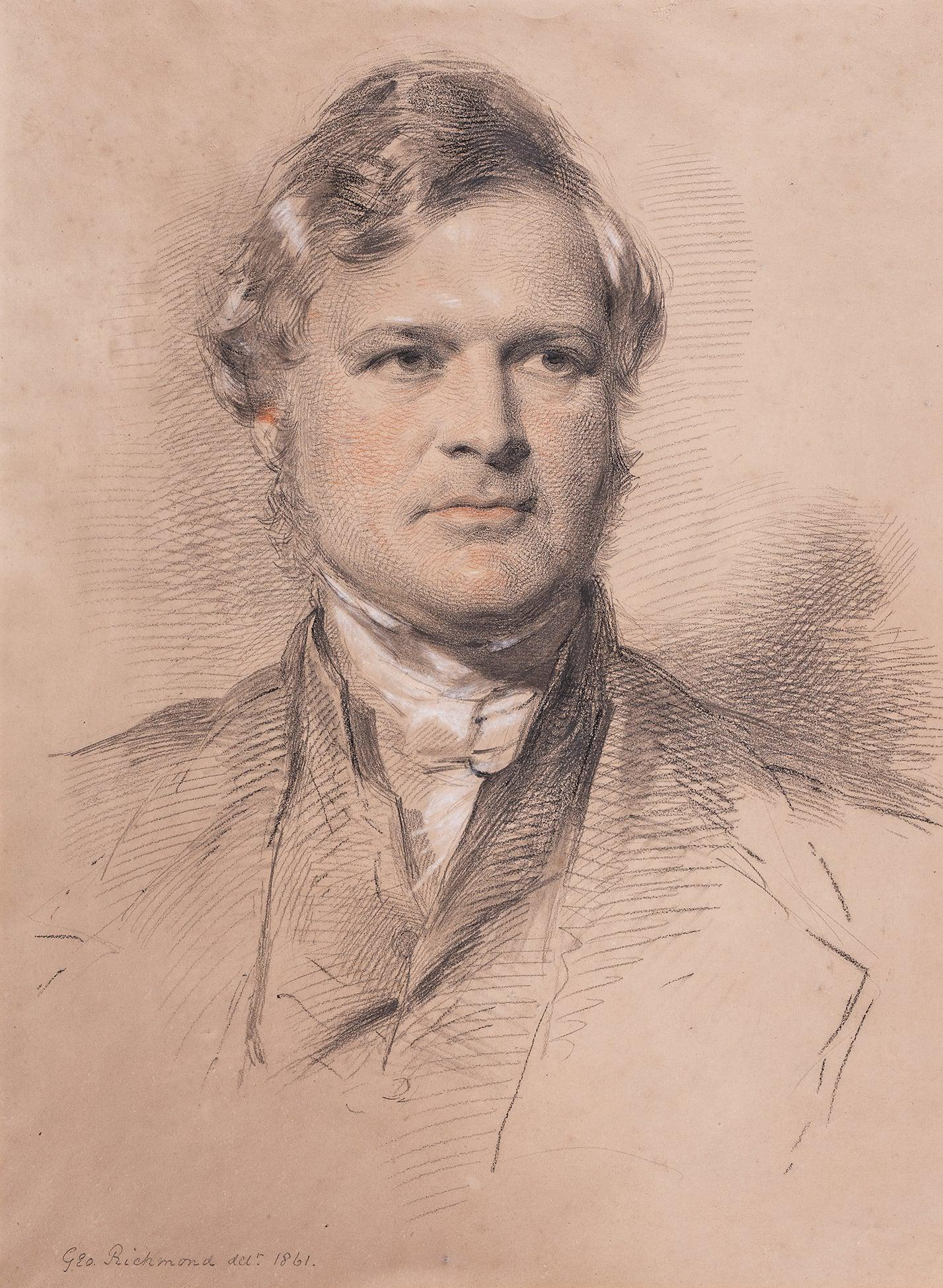
- Edward Meyrick Goulburn by George Richmond
- Born: 11 February 1818; Chelsea
- Died: 2 or 3 May 1897; Royal Tunbridge Wells
- Resting place: Aynho
- Alma mater: Eton College; Balliol College
- Occupation: Vicar, teacher, Minister
- Spouse(s): Julia Cartwright
- Parent(s): Edward Goulburn; Harriette de Visme
- Position held: Dean of Norwich (1866–1889), head teacher (1850–1857), dean (1843–1845)

Edward Meyrick Goulburn (11 February 1818 – 2 or 3 May 1897) was an English churchman.

Son of Mr Serjeant Edward Goulburn, M.P., recorder of Leicester, and nephew of the Right Hon. Henry Goulburn, chancellor of the exchequer in the ministries of Sir Robert Peel and the Duke of Wellington, he was born in London, and was educated at Eton and at Balliol College, Oxford. In 1839, he became fellow and tutor of Merton, and was ordained in 1842. For some years he held the living of Holywell, Oxford, and was chaplain to Samuel Wilberforce, bishop of the diocese. In 1850, he delivered the Bampton Lectures at Oxford on The Resurrection of the Body. In 1849, he had succeeded Tait as headmaster of Rugby, but in 1857 he resigned, and accepted the charge of Quebec Chapel, Marylebone.

In 1858 he became a prebendary of St Paul's, and in 1859 vicar of St John's, Paddington. In 1866, he was made Dean of Norwich, and in that office exercised a long and marked influence on church life. A strong Conservative and a churchman of traditional orthodoxy, he was a keen antagonist of higher criticism and of all forms of rationalism.

His Thoughts on Personal Religion (1862) and The Pursuit of Holiness were well received; and he wrote John William Burgon, Late Dean of Chichester: A Biography, With Extracts from His Letters and Early Journals (two volumes; 1892) about his friend Dean Burgon, with whose doctrinal views he was substantially in agreement. He resigned the deanery in 1889, and died at Tunbridge Wells on 3 May 1897. There is a memorial to him at Aynho.
