= John Baron (priest) =

Anglican priest

John Baron, D.D. (31 October 1677 – 11 July 1739) was an Anglican priest in the eighteenth century.

Bullock was educated at Pembroke College, Cambridge. He held livings at Brome, Chedgrave and Saxlingham. He was Archdeacon of Norfolk from 1731 to 1733; and Dean of Norwich from 1733 until his death.

== Notes ==
Church of England titles
Preceded by Robert Butts	Dean of Norwich; 1733–1739	Succeeded by Thomas Bullock
