= Thomas Bullock (priest) =

18th-century Anglican Dean

Thomas Bullock, D.D. (24 March 1694, in Herefordshire – 30 May 1760, in Norwich) was an Anglican Dean in the eighteenth century.

Bullock was educated at Christ Church, Oxford. He held livings at Mitcham, Surrey; Thurne and North Creake. He was Chaplain to the Bishop of Norwich from 1727 to 1738; and Dean of Norwich from 2 August 1739 until his death.

== Notes ==
Church of England titles
Preceded by John Baron	Dean of Norwich; 1739–1760	Succeeded by Edward Townshend
