= Norman Hook (priest) =

English priest (1898–1976)

Norman Hook (1898 – 20 May 1976) was an Anglican dean in the second quarter of the 20th century. Born in 1898 he was educated at Durham University (St Chad's Hall) and ordained in 1921. Following curacies in Liverpool he held incumbencies at Enborne, West Norwood and Knutsford. In 1945 he was appointed Rural Dean of Wimbledon and became a Canon of Southwark Cathedral. From 1953 until 1969 he was Dean of Norwich. An eminent author, he died on 20 May 1976.

== Arms ==
Coat of arms of Norman Hook

Notes
Granted 30 September 1968
Crest
A lion passant Or resting the dexter paw on a lozenge and in the mouth a shearman’s hook Sable.
Escutcheon
Azure in chief three triguetrae and in base a pelican in her piety Or.
Motto
Non Vestra Sed Vos

== Notes ==
Church of England titles
Preceded by Herbert St Barbe Holland	Dean of Norwich; 1953–1969	Succeeded by Alan Brunskill Webster
