= John Ives =

English genealogist

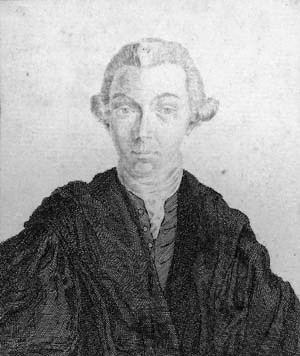
John Ives in an engraving published in 1822

John Ives FRS and FSA (14 July 1751 – 9 January 1776) was an antiquarian and officer of arms at the College of Arms in London. He was born in Great Yarmouth, the son of another John Ives, a wealthy merchant. He was baptized at a Congregationalist church and it was from a Congregationalist minister that he received his earliest educational instruction. He was planning to attend Gonville and Caius College but went to work in his father's counting-house in 1767.

Due to his father's wealth, Ives did not need to take a job, and his growing interest in British antiquities made it undesirable. Ives was elected as a fellow of the Society of Antiquaries of London on 13 June 1771. Shortly thereafter, Ives began to assemble material for a history of Lothingland, the north-easternmost part of Suffolk. This was never published, but a manuscript version of it, entitled Collectanea Lothinglandia or The History and Antiquities of the Hundred of Lothingland can be found in the British Library.

Ives was also able to spend time as a collector, thanks to his father's resources. He was also able to acquire a private press around the beginning of 1772. With this, he produced a printed copy of the baptismal and burial registers of Great Yarmouth for the preceding nine years in dated 5 September 1772.

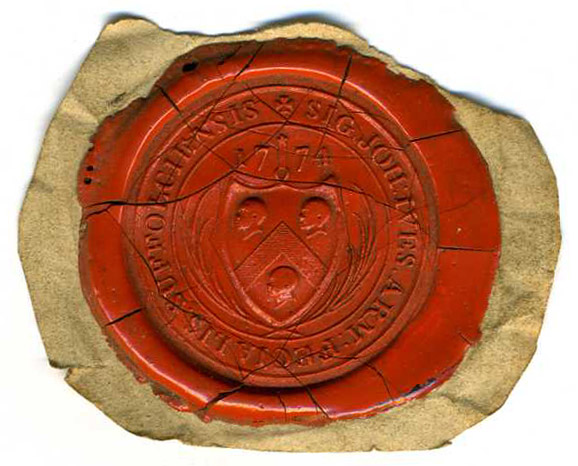
Ives's Seal as Suffolk Herald Extraordinary

Ives was made a fellow of the Royal Society on 25 March 1773. That summer, he eloped with Sarah Kett at Lambeth on 16 July 1773.

In October 1774 Ives was appointed Suffolk Herald of Arms Extraordinary at the College of Arms. As an officer extraordinary, he did not receive automatic access to the College's records. However, he was corresponding with John Charles Brooke, then Rouge Croix Pursuivant of Arms in Ordinary, which indicates that Ives was friendly with the officers in ordinary. He died of consumption at Great Yarmouth on 9 January 1776. He was buried with his family in Belton church. In accordance with his will, his collections were auctioned in the spring of 1777 in London, the proceeds going to Sarah, his widow.

== See also ==
- Heraldry
- Pursuivant
- Herald
