= John Nalson =

English polemicist (c. 1638–1686)

John Nalson (c. 1638–1686) was an English clergyman, historian and early Tory pamphleteer.

== Life ==
Born about 1638, he is said to have been educated at St. John's College, Cambridge, but his name does not appear in the list of admissions. He entered the church, and became rector of Doddington in the Isle of Ely. In 1678 he took the degree of LL.D.

Nalson was an active polemical writer on the side of the government during the latter part of the reign of Charles II. The Countermine, published in 1677 quickly went through three editions, and was highly praised by Roger L'Estrange. Published anonymously, its authorship was soon discovered, and the parliament of 1678, in which the opposition, whom he had attacked, had the majority, resolved to call Nalson to account. On 26 March 1678 he was sent for on the charge of having written a pamphlet called A Letter from a Jesuit in Paris, showing the most efficient way to ruin the Government and the Protestant Religion, in which the names of various members of parliament were introduced. After being kept in custody for about a month, he was discharged, but ordered to be put out of the commission of the peace, and to be reprimanded by the speaker (1 May).

Nalson then published several other pamphlets, undertook to make a collection of documents in answer to John Rushworth (1682), and printed the Trial of Charles I (1684), prefixing to his historical works long polemical attacks on the whigs. He begged William Sancroft for preferment; he asked on 21 July 1680 for the deanery of Worcester, on 14 August 1680 for the mastership of Trinity College, Cambridge, and to be given a prebend either at Westminster or Ely. In 1684 he did receive a prebend at Ely. He died on 24 March 1686, aged 48, and was buried at Ely.

== Works and collection of papers ==
Nalson's major work is the Impartial Collection of the Great Affairs of State, from the beginning of the Scotch Rebellion in the year 1639 to the murder of King Charles I. The first volume was published in 1682, and the second in 1683, but the collection in fact ends in January 1642. Its avowed object was to serve as an antidote to the similar collection of materials by Rushworth, and the work was undertaken under the special patronage of Charles II. Nalson was allowed free access to various repositories of state papers. From the documents in the office of the clerk of the parliament he was apparently allowed to take almost anything he pleased. He also had access to the Paper Office, to take copies. He applied to the Duke of Ormonde for documents relating to Ireland, and obtained permission to copy some of the papers. Lord Guilford communicated to him extracts from the memoirs of the Earl of Manchester, and he at least planned to obtain help from the Earl of Macclesfield, one of the last survivors of the king's generals.

Nalson in these ways brought together a collection of primary sources and original documents illustrating the history of the period between 1638 and 1660. On his death it all remained in the possession of his family. The collection was gradually broken up. Some of the Irish transcripts came into the hands of Thomas Carte, and a considerable number of the parliamentary papers were abstracted by Thomas Tanner. These portions of the collection are in the Bodleian Library. Twenty-two volumes came to Welbeck Abbey; four volumes were purchased by the British Museum in 1846, and four others went missing. Some documents from Nalson's collection were printed by Zachary Grey in his answer to Daniel Neal's History of the Puritans (1737-9), and others by Francis Peck in his Desiderata Curiosa (1735).

The Common Interest of King & People (1678) argues for monarchy, but in part on a utilitarian basis. Nalson's only other historical work was A True Copy of the Journal of the High Court of Justice for the Trial of K. Charles I (1684).

Nalson is notable for making the claim that Cardinal Richelieu of France was involved in secretly stoking the initial stages of the Irish Rebellion of 1641 and the unrest of Scottish Covenanters in the Bishops' Wars during the reign of Charles I of England. For Nalson, the motivation for Richelieu to do this (even supporting a Radical Protestant revolt) was to keep England tied down with various domestic divisions so that is could not uphold the balance of power in Europe. He claims that John Pym had in his possession a letter confirming the involvement of Richelieu in these affairs, but chose not to publish it and blame Charles I instead.

== Bibliography ==
- Nalson, John (1682). An Impartial Collection of the Great Affairs of State, from the beginning of the Scotch Rebellion in the year 1639 to the murder of King Charles I. Vol. I. London: by His Majesties Special Command.
- —— (1683). An Impartial Collection of the Great Affairs of State, from the beginning of the Scotch Rebellion in the year 1639 to the murder of King Charles I. Vol. II. London: by His Majesties Special Command.
