= Gesta Francorum Iherusalem peregrinantium =

Chronicle by Fulcher of Chartres

A history of the expedition to Jerusalem
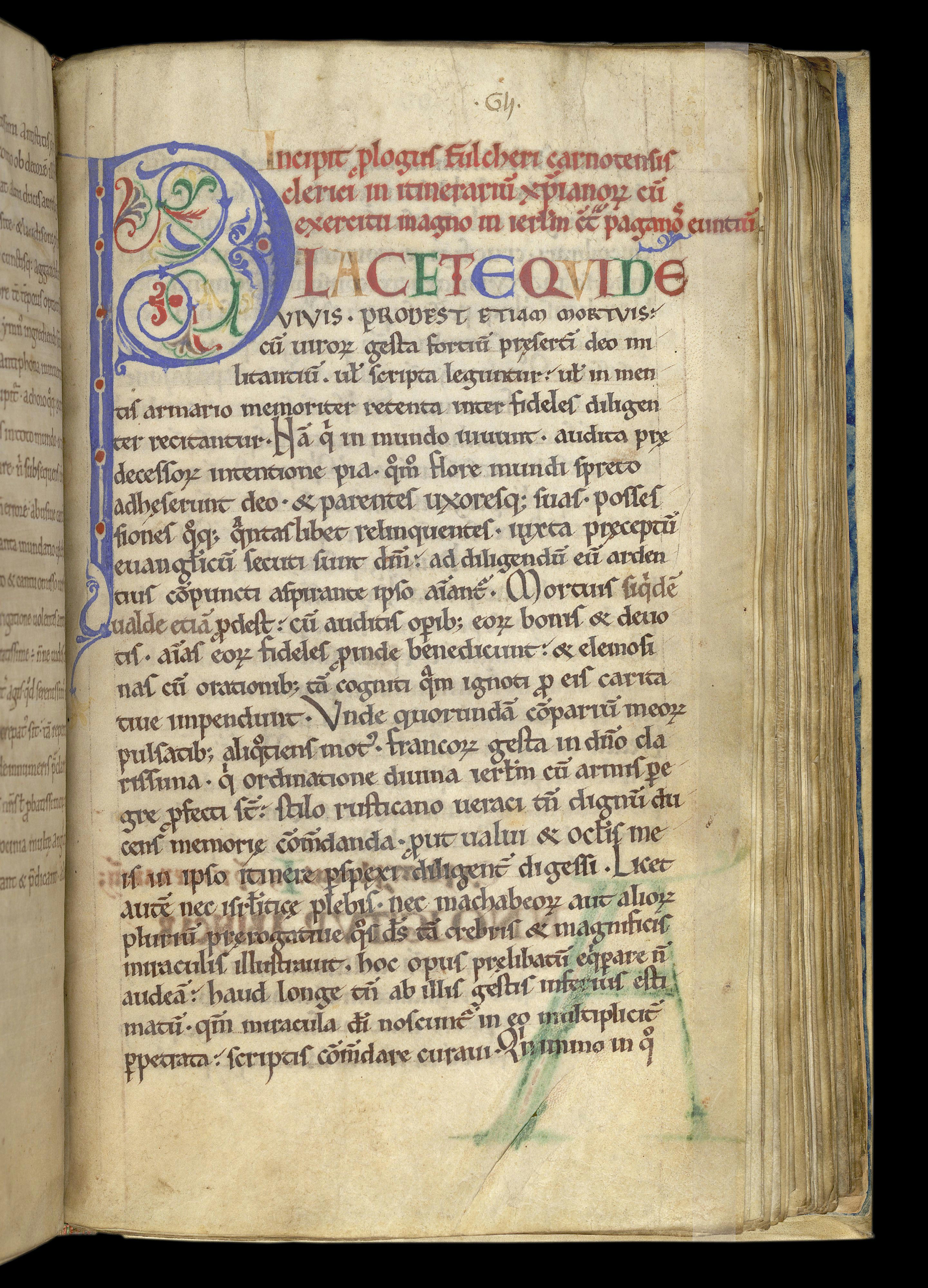
- Author: Fulcher of Chartres
- Original title: Gesta Francorum Iherusalem peregrinantium
- Translator: Frances Rita Ryan (English)(Complete Version)
- Language: Latin
- Subject: First Crusade
- Genre: chronicle
- Publication place: Kingdom of Jerusalem

The Gesta Francorum Iherusalem peregrinantium (A history of the expedition to Jerusalem) is a Latin chronicle of the First Crusade written on 1101, 1106, 1124 until 1127 by Fulcher of Chartres (c. 1059 – after 1128). He was a priest who participated in the First Crusade. He served Baldwin I of Jerusalem for many years, and wrote a chronicle of the Crusade, writing in Latin.

== Gesta Francorum ==
Fulcher wrote a chronicle of the crusade, made of three books. He started writing it in 1101 and finished around 1128. The chronicle is considered among the best records of the crusade. Included in the chronicle is his account of Pope Urban II's November 1095 speech at the Council of Clermont where Urban calls for the First Crusade:

[Your] brethren who live in the east are in urgent need of your help, and you must hasten to give them the aid which has often been promised them. For, as the most of you have heard, the Turks and Arabs have attacked them and have conquered the territory of Romania [the Greek empire] as far west as the shore of the Mediterranean and the Hellespont, which is called the Arm of St. George. They have occupied more and more of the lands of those Christians, and have overcome them in seven battles. They have killed and captured many, and have destroyed the churches and devastated the empire. If you permit them to continue thus for awhile with impurity, the faithful of God will be much more widely attacked by them.

At the earliest, Fulcher began his chronicle in the late autumn of 1100, or at the latest in the spring of 1101, in a version that has not survived but which was transmitted to Europe during his lifetime. This version was completed around 1106 and was used as a source by Guibert of Nogent, a contemporary of Fulcher in Europe.

He began his work at the urging of his travelling companions, who probably included Baldwin I. He had at least one library in Jerusalem at his disposal, from which he had access to letters and other documents of the crusade. In this library the Historia Francorum of Raymond of Aguilers and the Gesta Francorum must also have been available, which served as sources for much of the specific information in Fulcher's work that he did not personally witness.

Fulcher divided his chronicle into three books. Book I described the preparations for the First Crusade in Clermont in 1095 up to the conquest of Jerusalem and the establishment of the Kingdom of Jerusalem by Godfrey of Bouillon. It included an enthusiastic description of Constantinople. The second book described the deeds of Baldwin I, who succeeded Godfrey and was king of Jerusalem from 1100 to 1118. The third and final book reported on the life of Baldwin II of Jerusalem, until 1127 when there was a plague in Jerusalem, during which Fulcher apparently died. The second and third books were written from around 1109 to 1115, and from 1118 to 1127, compiled into a second edition by Fulcher himself.

Fulcher's work was used by many other chroniclers who lived after him. William of Tyre and William of Malmesbury used part of the chronicle as a source. His chronicle is generally accurate, though not entirely so. It was published in the Recueil des historiens des croisades and the Patrologia Latina, and a critical edition of the Latin version was published by Heinrich Hagenmeyer in 1913.
