= Roger Townshend =

Roger Townshend may refer to:

- Sir Roger Townshend (judge) (c. 1430–1493), English landowner, Judge of the Court of Common Pleas, MP for Bramber
- Sir Roger Townshend (Norfolk MP, born 1477) (1477–1552), English landowner, MP for Norfolk, son of the above
- Sir Roger Townshend (courtier, died 1590) (c. 1544–1590), English landowner, courtier and soldier, great-grandson of the above
- Sir Roger Townshend, 1st Baronet (c. 1596–1637), English landowner, MP for Orford and Norfolk, grandson of the above
- Sir Roger Townshend, 2nd Baronet (1628–1648), English landowner, eldest son of the above
- Roger Townshend (Norfolk MP, died 1709), English soldier, MP for Norfolk and Great Yarmouth, nephew of the above
- Roger Townshend (British Army officer, born 1708) (1708–1760), English soldier, MP for Great Yarmouth and Eye, nephew of the above
