= Hayward Townshend =

Hayward (Heyward, Heywood) Townshend (ca. 1577 – before 1603) was Member of Parliament for Bishop's Castle, Shropshire, England, in 1597–1598 and 1601. His parliamentary diary, first published in 1680, covers both of these Parliaments, and is one of the fullest available records of proceedings in the 1601 Parliament.

== Family ==
Hayward Townshend was the eldest son of Sir Henry Townshend (1537?–1621), second justice of Chester, and his wife, Susan Hayward (d. 1592), daughter of Sir Rowland Hayward, Lord Mayor of London.

He was the grandson of Sir Robert Townshend, Chief Justice of Cheshire, and the great-grandson of Sir Roger Townshend (d. 1551).

He was a third cousin of Sir Roger Townshend (d. 1590) and of Aurelian Townshend.
