= West Raynham =

Village in Norfolk, England

Coordinates: 52.79334°N 0.77447°E

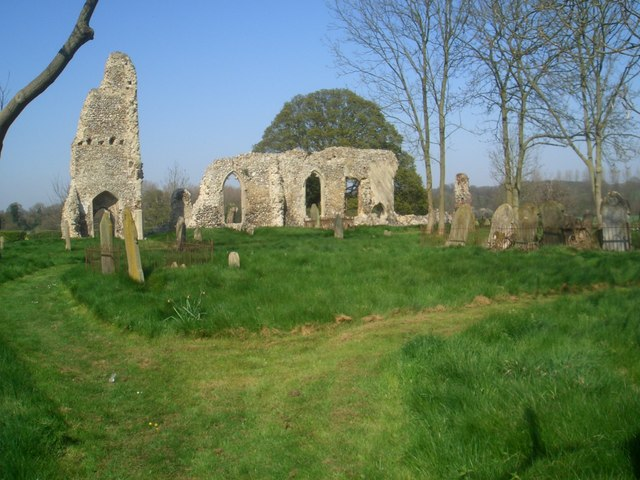
- The ruins of St Margaret's church

- Location within Norfolk
- OS grid reference: TF871253
  - London: 110 miles
- Civil parish: Raynham
- District: North Norfolk
- Shire county: Norfolk
- Region: East
- Country: England
- Sovereign state: United Kingdom
- Post town: Fakenham
- Postcode district: NR21
- Dialling code: 01328
- Police: Norfolk
- Fire: Norfolk
- Ambulance: East of England
- UK Parliament: North Norfolk

West Raynham is a village and former civil parish, now in the parish of Raynham, in the North Norfolk district, in the county of Norfolk, England. It is located close to the A1065 road, some five miles southwest of Fakenham and is the largest village on the Raynham estate. The river Wensum flows nearby. In 1931, the parish had a population of 241.

== History ==
The village can trace its origins back and before the Domesday survey of 1086 when it was known as Reinham.

The villages name means 'Regna's homestead/village' or 'Regna's hemmed-in land'.

On 1 April 1935 the parish was abolished to form Raynham.

== The Raynhams ==
Today, The Raynhams would cover West, East and South Raynham, a large area of farmland known as Raynham Park, which the Raynham villages and the 17th-century Raynham Hall border.

== Raynham Hall ==
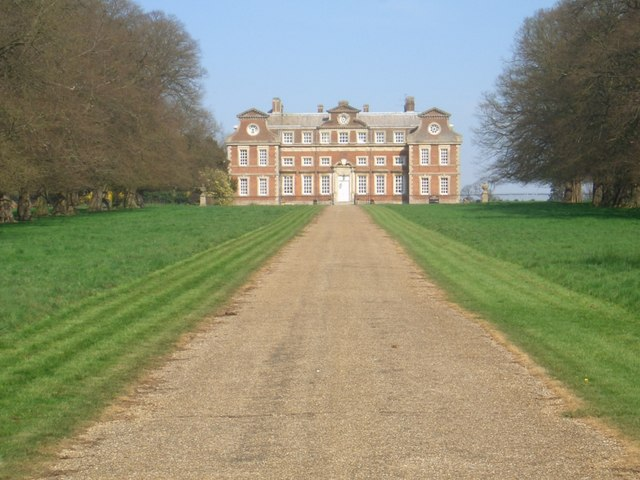
Raynham Hall

Raynham Hall is a rectangular mansion built of brick and stone dressings. Work commenced in 1619, and was completed in 1630. It is the seat of the Townshend family, and is owned today by the 7th Marquis Townshend.

== The Church of St Margaret ==
The church was first built in the 11th century. It fell into ruins from the 1720s, when the lead roof was removed to help pay for the restoration of St Marys at East Raynham. The ruin has now been consolidated and the church is now back in occasional use.

== RAF West Raynham ==
The former Royal Air Force station, RAF West Raynham, is located 2 miles west of the village. It opened in 1939 and closed in 1994, when it was sold to a property developer. Most of the properties are empty and in need of restoration, but people do currently live on the site and all houses are available to rent. There is also a small shop on site. In 2010, the paranormal television series Most Haunted filmed 5 episodes on the base.

== Recreation ==
Much of the area can be visited by a circular walk which takes in mixed woodland, water meadows, arable land and historic buildings, almost entirely on the Raynham estate.
