= Thomas Knyvet (died 1605) =

English politician

Sir Thomas Knyvet (died 1605), of Ashwellthorpe, Norfolk and Stradbroke, Suffolk, was an English politician.

He was the eldest son of Sir Thomas Knyvet of Ashwellthorpe, de jure 4th Baron Berners, by his wife by Muriel (d.1616), daughter of Sir Thomas Parry, was educated at Queens' College, Cambridge (1584) and studied law at the Middle Temple (1591). He was knighted in 1603.

He was appointed Purveyor of the Tower Mint in 1600. He was elected a Member (MP) of the Parliament of England for Aldeburgh in 1593 and Thetford in 1601.

On his death he was buried at Feltwell, Norfolk. He had married Elizabeth, the daughter and co-heiress of Nathaniel Bacon of Stiffkey, Norfolk, with whom he had 2 sons and a daughter:

- The Royalist JP Thomas Knyvett, 5th Baron Berners
- Nathaniell Knyvett of Denver in Norfolk, second son. His will was proven 17 December 1659, he was then residing at Intwood. He married Margaret Vernatti of Delft in Holland, and had Nathaniell Knyvett of Denver in Norfolk, gentleman, will proven 15 Februar 1672/3, s.p.; Elizabeth, eldest daughter, who married John Ayde; Adriana; and Margaret who marriet Robert London of Aldeby
- Elizabeth Knyvett, who married Sir Thomas Pettus
