= Thomas Browne (died 1597) =

English politician

Sir Thomas Browne
- Died: 9 February 1597
- Spouses: Mabel Fitzwilliam; Helen or Ellen Harding
- Children: Sir Matthew Browne; Jane Browne; Mabel Browne; Richard Browne
- Parent(s): Henry Browne, Katherine Shelley

Thomas Browne (died 9 February 1597), of Betchworth Castle, Surrey, was an English politician.

== Family ==
Browne was a descendant of Sir Thomas Browne, Treasurer of the Household to Henry VI, and related in the male line to the Viscounts Montagu of Cowdray, Sussex, and in the female line to Lord Buckhurst.

He was the eldest son of Henry Browne, esquire, of Betchworth Castle, Surrey, and his first wife, Katherine Shelley, the daughter of Sir William Shelley of Michelgrove in Clapham, Sussex, by Alice Belknap, daughter of Henry Belknap, esquire.

After the death of his first wife, Alice, Henry Browne married Mary Fitz Herbert, daughter of John Fitz Herbert, by whom he had no issue.

After the death of his second wife, Mary, Henry Browne married Eleanor Shirley, the daughter of Thomas Shirley (d.1545) of West Grinstead, Sussex, by Elizabeth Gorges, the daughter of Marmaduke Gorges.

After the death of Henry Browne, his widow, Eleanor, married, by licence dated 15 February 1548, William Sackville (d. 19 May 1556) of Bletchingley, Surrey.

By his father's first marriage to Katherine Shelley, Thomas Browne had an only sister, Mary Browne, who married Cuthbert Blagden, gentleman. By his father's third marriage to Eleanor Shirley, Browne had five half brothers, Richard, Roger, John, Alexander, and Jasper, and two half sisters, Katherine Browne, who married a husband surnamed Hill, and Elizabeth Browne.

== Career ==
Browne was educated at St John's College, Cambridge.

He was a Justice of the Peace for Surrey from about 1559, and was appointed High Sheriff of Surrey in 1570–71, and High Sheriff of Surrey and Sussex in 1582–83. He was a deputy lieutenant of Surrey by 1569, and was knighted in 1576.

He was elected Member of Parliament for Surrey in 1559, Wallingford in 1563, Arundel in 1571, and Bletchingley in 1572 and 1586.

He was among those involved in the examination of the translator Arthur Hall after his arrest in 1581.

Browne died 9 February 1597. His widow, Helen, left a will dated 18 August 1601.

== Marriages and issue ==
Browne married firstly, before 16 December 1558, Mabel Fitzwilliam (born c.1540), eldest daughter and coheiress of the courtier Sir William Fitzwilliam of Windsor, Berkshire, by whom he had a son and two daughters:

- Sir Matthew Browne, who married Jane Vincent, and was slain in a duel with his kinsman, Sir John Townshend, on 1 August 1603;
- Jane Browne, who married Sir Oliph Leigh;
- Mabel Browne

Browne married secondly Helen or Ellen Harding, one of the daughters of William Harding (d. 7 September 1549), citizen and goldsmith of London, by Cecily Marshe, the daughter of Walter Marshe of London. William Harding was the elder son of Robert Harding (d.1515) of Knowle Park in Cranleigh, Surrey; his sister, Elizabeth Harding, married Humphrey Pakington, the brother of Sir John Pakington and Robert Pakyngton.

After the death of William Harding, Cecily Marshe married Robert Warner, who in 1557 purchased the wardship of her daughters, Helen (d.1601) and Katherine (d.1599). In 1559 Katherine Harding married Queen Elizabeth's Solicitor General, Richard Onslow, and Helen Harding married firstly, Richard Knyvet, by whom she had issue, and secondly, Thomas Browne, by whom she had a son, Richard Browne.
