= Thomas Knyvett, 5th Baron Berners =

English magistrate (1596–1658)

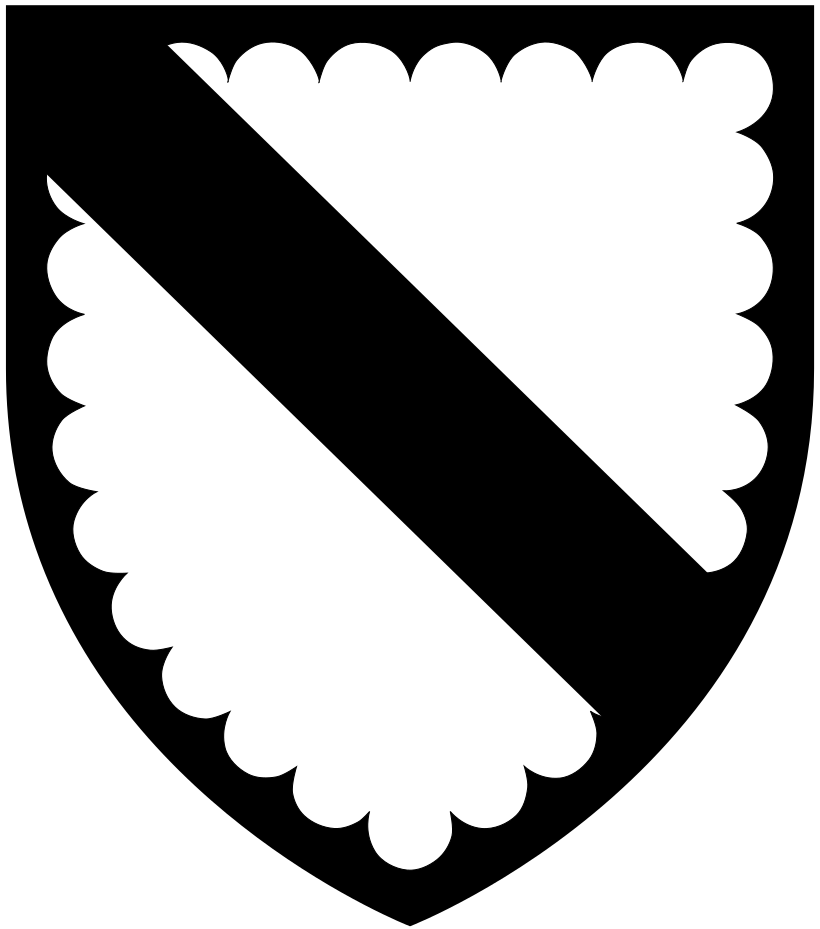
Arms of Knyvett: Argent, a bend sable a bordure engrailed of the last

Thomas Knyvett (1596–1658) was an English JP and Royalist during the English Civil War.

== Early Years ==
Thomas Knyvett (III) was born in the early summer of 1596 and soon baptized on 10 June. Thomas was born to his father Sir Thomas Knyvett (II), who served as a Member of Parliament for Norfolk in 1593, and his mother Elizabeth, daughter and coheir of Nathaniel Bacon of Stiffkey. Sir Thomas II died in September 1605, leaving the nine year old Thomas III as sole heir to his grandfather Sir Thomas Knyvett I's estate. Elizabeth's father, Nathaniel Bacon, also had no surviving sons, making Elizabeth coheir to her father's estate, along with the young Thomas III.

Thomas III matriculated to Emmanuel College, Cambridge as a Fellow-Commoner in November 1612, where he received his B.A. two years later in 1614. Thomas came into most of his property four year later at the death of his grandfather Sir Thomas I in February 1618, and the younger Thomas spent nearly a decade in various lawsuits over his inheritance. After leaving Cambridge, Thomas worked as a lawyer in Norfolk and London, while maintaining his various estates. He inherited and kept an extensive library, which several antiquarians utilized over the years, including William Le Neve and John Spelman.

== Marriage and children ==
He met his future wife Katherine Burgh sometime after leaving Cambridge, and the two married on 28 February 1620. They had six children together:

- Elizabeth (1620–1621);
- Thomas (April – November 1622);
- John (1623–1673);
- Thomas (b. 1625);
- Nathaniel (d. February 1626); and
- Muriel (b. May 1627).

Thomas appears as a loving father and husband in his surviving correspondence. He referred to all of his children with nicknames - Buss for Elizabeth, Muss for Muriel, Tom for Thomas, and Jack for John. Thomas wrote most of his letters while in London or Norwich on business, and he often expressed a longing for his wife, along with affectionate titles, closings and playful teasing.

== Career ==
Thomas gained several minor bureaucratic positions within the Royal government over the next few decades. Knyvett was likely a Groom to Prince Charles in 1624, and intended to follow Charles and the Duke of Buckingham to Spain to aid in negotiating the Spanish Match. His trip was stayed in late April 1623, and after the failure of the match, the trip was canceled altogether. After Charles I's ascension in 1625, Knyvett was summoned to become a member of the Knights of the Bath. The honor would have cost Knyvett over £500, so he refused the honor and attempted to revive his de jure title of the Baron Berners. The title had been dormant since his ancestor John Bourchier, 2nd Baron Berners died in 1533. Thomas would maintain his claim to the Barony for several years, but never succeed in obtaining it. In 1632, Knyvett received the post of the Porter of the Mint, a post that had been held by his grandfather Sir Thomas. Four years later, Thomas is recorded as serving as a Justice of the Peace for the county Norfolk.

In matters of religion, Thomas was an unremarkable traditionalist. During the interlude between the Bishops' Wars, Thomas stated that he went "to Church now to learn the old way to heaven," as opposed to the more radical preaching heard by "Parliament men." A few weeks later, Thomas was required by Parliament, as a Justice of the Peace, to present the names of people who refused to receive Communion, then known as recusants. Parliament ordered that the recusants be charged and prosecuted for their recusantry at the next Assizes, and Thomas dutifully complied in January 1641. Parliament's order was an extension of the Ecclesiastical Canons issued in 1640 by Archbishop Laud and the Convocation of Canterbury that stated that every Bishop send out writs de excommunicato capiendo once a year. Bishops and JPs used this writ to punish and fine recusants who had refused to reconcile with the church after a given period of time. Sometime after presenting his list of recusants for Norfolk, Thomas and a fellow JP Henry Cogan, petitioned Archbishop Laud, asking for forgiveness for proceeding in the writs before their commissions had been properly issued. Thomas' commission was corrected, and he proceeded with what little of the proceedings he could before the outbreak of military hostilities six months later.

As order deteriorated in the spring of 1641, Thomas was in London reporting on the trial of the Earl of Strafford and the imprisonment of Laud. Early stirrings of Thomas' loyalty to the crown come across in his letters, where he sympathizes with Strafford, and remarks that Strafford was a man "of so unmovable a temper," against the "bad cause" of his opponents. After the outbreak of open warfare between Charles and Parliament, Thomas was a known Royalist sympathizer, and refused a Captain's commission to serve in the Parliamentary forces. During the initial years of hostilities, Parliament tried to solidify their occupation of East Anglia. One of the leading Colonels in the area, Oliver Cromwell took action to purge Norwich and the surrounding towns of Royalists. Cromwell, among others, wrote to the Deputy-Lieutenants for Norfolk that he feared that "the Papists in Norfolk are solicited to rise presently upon you," and proceeded to travel through East Anglia with around one thousand soldiers swept through Norfolk to the ports of Lowestoft and King's Lynn. Thomas Knyvett was just unlucky enough to be trying to escape to the Netherlands through Lowestoft. The townsmen of Lowestoft also happened to get wind of Cromwell's coming and tried to mount a Royalist resistance against him. However, the port fell quickly, with Knyvett inside. Knyvett surrendered peacefully, but was taken as a prisoner of war, along with several other Royalist gentlemen.

Thomas spent the next several months in and out of confinement, ending in prison in Windsor Castle in April 1643. By August, Thomas was in London attempting to prevent the seizure of his lands. Parliament had passed sequestration ordinances that allowed them to seize the property and estates of convicted Royalists, and the victims had to pay hefty fines to retrieve their estates. Thomas succeeded in postponing his hearing while he enlisted the help of friends, and eventually gained a recommendation from the Earl of Manchester, a prominent Parliamentarian General. Eventually in August 1644, almost fifteen months since his capture, Thomas' fine was lifted and he was restored to his property. Thomas attempted to remain silent and neutral through the remainder of the conflict, though he remained staunchly loyal to the King, stating in 1648 that a publication had to be by Charles I because "a counterfeit would never have had that power of my passion that this had. I wish forty thousand stout well-armed men had however the same sense of it." Thomas only crops up again twice before he died in 1658. In 1655, he had a spat with one of his tenants, Richard Cosen, a Quaker, when Thomas extorted "a mare and a colt" from Cosen, which exceeded the debt Cosen owed Thomas. Thomas wrote at the time that "mony I can gyt none" as his tenants could not afford to pay their rents, and Thomas could not afford to pay the decimation tax. The decimation tax was reintroduced in 1655 when Parliament renewed efforts to sequester property from Royalists, and Thomas was again a target in Norfolk. Thomas enlisted the help of no one less than the Protector Oliver Cromwell to aid in exempting him from the seizures. Thomas claimed that he had no knowledge of the plot in Lowestoft, had never raised arms against Parliament or the Commonwealth, and that he had been discharged in 1644. Cromwell attempted to intercede, but to no avail. Thomas died two years later in 1658.

Peerage of England
| Preceded by Thomas Knyvett | Baron Berners (de jure); 1618–1658 | Succeeded by John Knyvett |
