= Sir Roger Townshend, 1st Baronet =

English landowner and politician

Arms of Townshend: Azure, a chevron ermine between three escallops argent

Sir Roger Townshend, 1st Baronet (c.1596 – 1 January 1637), was an English landowner and politician who sat in the House of Commons in two parliaments between 1621 and 1629.

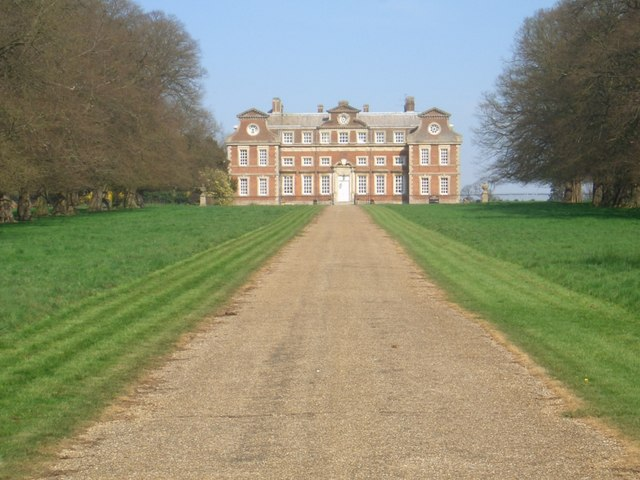
Raynham Hall

== Family ==
Townshend was the son of Sir John Townshend (died 1603) of Raynham, Norfolk and his wife Anne Bacon (1573–1622), eldest of the three daughters of Sir Nathaniel Bacon (c.1546–1622) by his first wife, Anne Gresham (d.1594), the illegitimate daughter of Sir Thomas Gresham.

He was the grandson of Sir Roger Townshend (died 1590) and Jane Stanhope (c.1547–1618), the daughter of Sir Michael Stanhope (d.1552) of Shelford, Nottinghamshire, by his wife, Anne Rawson, daughter of Nicholas Rawson of Aveley, Essex. After the death of Sir Roger Townshend (died 1590) (d.1590), his widow, Jane, married, as his second wife, Henry Berkeley, 7th Baron Berkeley. She died at her house in the Barbican on 3 January 1618, leaving a will dated 20 July 1617 which was proved by her grandson, Sir Roger Townshend, 1st Baronet, on 10 March 1618.

== Career ==
Townshend succeeded to the estate of Raynham when his father, Sir John Townshend, died on 2 August 1603 from a wound received in a duel with a kinsman, Sir Matthew Browne.

In 1617 he was created a Baronet, of Raynham in the County of Norfolk. He began the construction of the family seat of Raynham Hall to the design of the architect Inigo Jones in 1619.

In 1621 Townshend was elected Member of Parliament for Orford. He was elected MP for Norfolk in 1628 and sat until 1629 when King Charles decided to rule without parliament for eleven years. He was Sheriff of Norfolk in 1629.

Townshend was much esteemed for his charity and munificence. He died aged 41 and was buried in the church of East Raynham.

== Marriage and issue ==
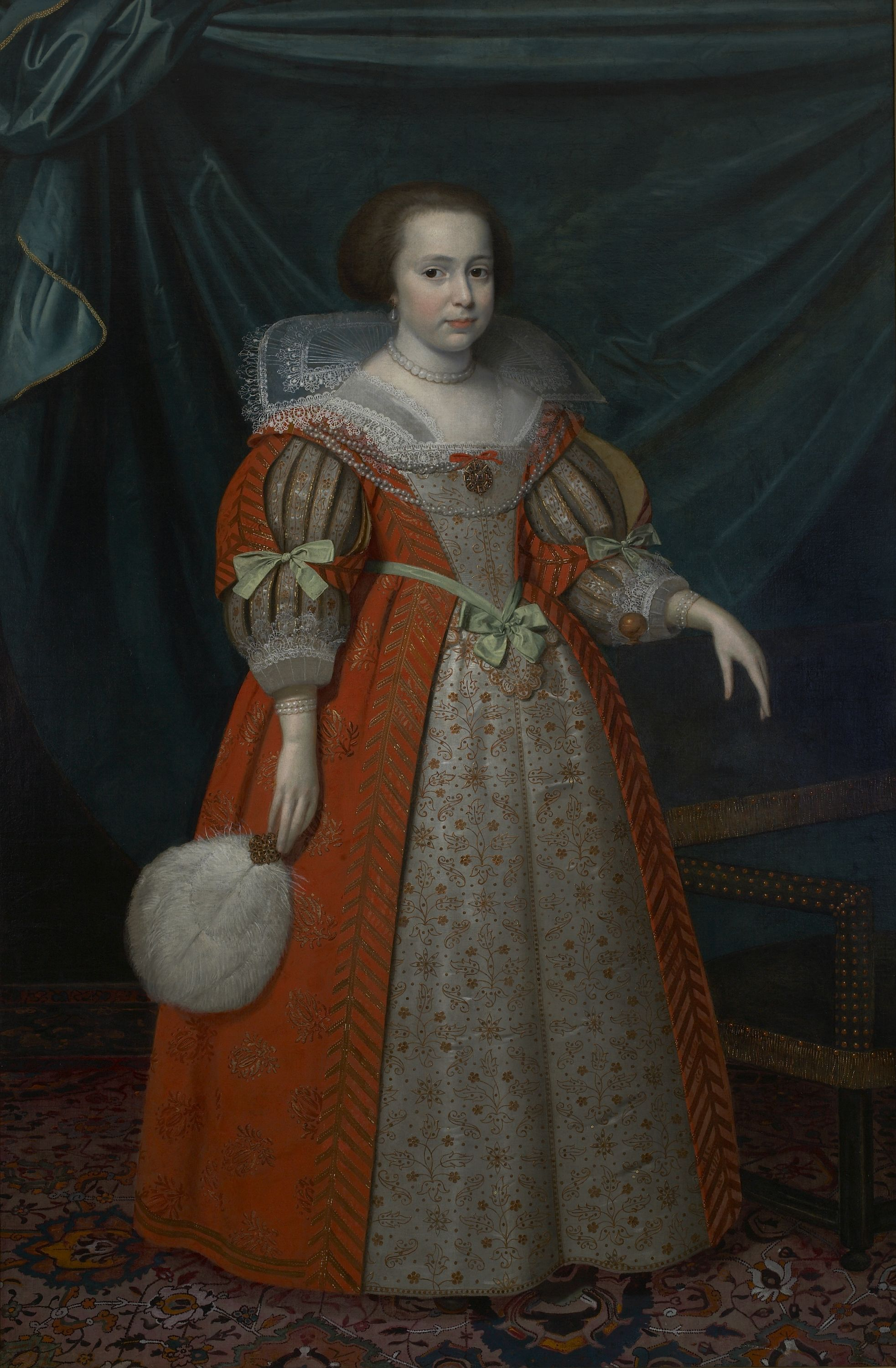
Mary de Vere, Lady Townshend

Townshend married in or before 1628, Mary de Vere, daughter of Horace Vere, 1st Baron Vere of Tilbury. He was succeeded in the baronetcy by his eldest son, Roger. His younger son, Horatio, succeeded to the baronetcy in 1648, and was later elevated to the peerage as Viscount Townshend.

His widow married Mildmay Fane, 2nd Earl of Westmorland on 21 June 1638, at Hackney.

== Ancestry ==
Ancestors of Sir Roger Townshend, 1st Baronet

8. Sir Richard Townshend
4. Sir Roger Townshend
9. Katherine Browne
2. Sir John Townshend
10. Sir Michael Stanhope
5. Jane Stanhope
11. Anne Rawson
1. Sir Roger Townshend, 1st Baronet
12. Sir Nicholas Bacon
6. Sir Nathaniel Bacon
13. Jane Ferneley
3. Anne Bacon
14. Sir Thomas Gresham
7. Anne Gresham
15. Anne Ferneley

Parliament of England
Preceded by William Cornwallis; Sir Francis Baildon	Member of Parliament for Orford; 1621–1622; With: Sir Lionel Tollemache, 2nd Baronet	Succeeded by Sir Robert Hitcham; William Glover
Preceded by Sir Edward Coke; Sir Robert Bell	Member of Parliament for Norfolk; 1628–1629; With: John Heveningham	Parliament suspended until 1640
Baronetage of England
New creation	Baronet (of Raynham); 1617–1637	Succeeded by Roger Townshend
