= Aurelian Townshend =

English poet and playwright

Aurelian Townshend (sometimes Townsend; c. 1583 – c. 1649) was a seventeenth-century English poet and playwright.

== Family ==
Aurelian Townshend was the son of John Townshend of Dereham Abbey, Norfolk. Both Aurelian and his sister, Frances, were born before 12 December 1583, at which date they are mentioned in the will of Thomas Townshend of Crimplesham, Norfolk. Aurelian was a third cousin of Sir Roger Townshend and of the historian Hayward Townshend (c. 1577 – 1603×21).

Townshend's mother was named Anne, and is said to have been the daughter of Sir Richard Catlin.

== Career ==
Very little is well established about Townshend's life.

Robert Cecil directed Aurelian's education and sent him to Europe to study. In Venice Anthony Sherley took his money. Within three years, Townshend was back in England. He then spent a year in France as Edward Herbert's friend and aide who "spoke French, Italian and Spanish in great perfection". He was not much help when Herbert was attacked by a wild boar.

In 1613, he became the librettist of Inigo Jones. He became a friend of Thomas Carew's, and wrote poetry for around five years. Carew referred to Townshend in his "In Answer of an Elegiacal Letter, upon the Death of the King of Sweden, from Aurelian Townshend, Inviting Me to Write on That Subject" (published in 1640), where he indicates that Townshend was more engaged in the political world than he.

He was one of the Cavalier poets, and his masque Tempe Restored was performed on Shrove Tuesday of 1632 and had in its cast Queen Henrietta Maria and fourteen court ladies. From such heights as the court masque, Townshend rapidly fell. In 1643, he appears as "a poore and pocky Poet, (who) would bee glad to sell an 100 verses now at sixpence a piece, 50 shillings an 100 verses" before the House of Lords, seeking protection from creditors. The "pocky"-ness implies that, with his debts, Townshend had acquired disease (although not necessarily venereal disease).

== Descendants ==
He had a daughter, Mary Townshend. She married George Kirke, a Groom of the Bedchamber. Their daughter Diana Kirke married Aubrey de Vere, 20th Earl of Oxford in 1673. Their son Charles died as an infant, and with the death of the 20th Earl the earldom of Oxford, created in 1142, became extinct.

== Works ==
Townshend's poetry is remarkably formal and simultaneously free. His language is delicate, and his lines musical. T. S. Eliot praised the musicality of Townshend's poetry, and Hugh Kenner argues that Townshend's mixture of formality and liberty set the stage for Andrew Marvell, while others consider him distinctly minor (e.g. Rumrich and Chaplin).
