= Roger Townshend (courtier, died 1590) =

English nobleman, politician, soldier and knight

Sir Roger Townshend Kt
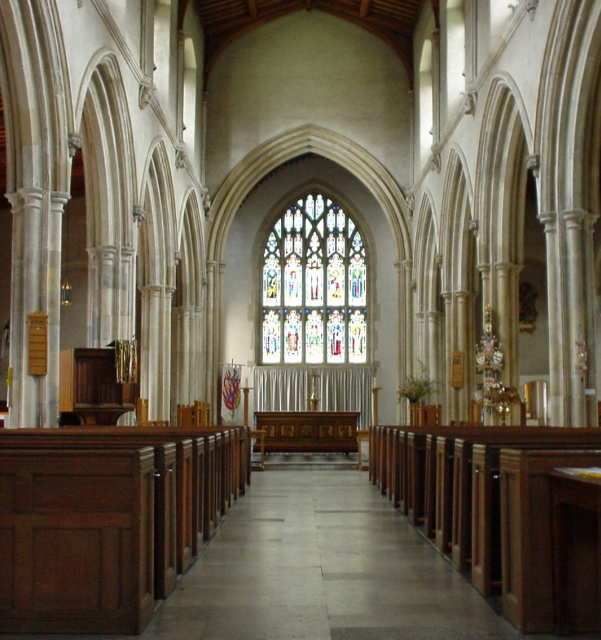
- St Giles Cripplegate, where Sir Roger Townshend was buried
- Born: c. 1544
- Died: 30 June 1590 (aged 45–46); Stoke Newington
- Occupations: Soldier, Knight, Politician
- Spouses: Ursula Heydon; Jane Stanhope
- Children: Sir John Townshend (died 1603); Sir Robert Townshend
- Parent(s): Sir Richard Townshend (died 1551), Katherine Browne

Sir Roger Townshend (c. 1544 – 30 June 1590) was an English nobleman, politician, soldier, and knight. He was the son of Sir Richard Townshend (died 1551) and Katherine Browne. He spent much of his career in the service of Thomas Howard, 4th Duke of Norfolk, and Norfolk's son and heir, Philip Howard, 20th Earl of Arundel. He was knighted at sea on 26 July 1588 during the battle against the Spanish Armada.

== Family ==
Roger Townshend was the eldest son of Sir Richard Townshend (died 1551), esquire, of Brampton, Norfolk, and Katherine Browne, the daughter and coheir of Sir Humphrey Browne of Ridley Hall in Terling, Essex, Justice of the Common Pleas. He was the grandson of Sir John Townshend (d. 1543/4) by his wife, Eleanor Heydon, daughter of the courtier Sir John Heydon of Baconsthorpe Castle, Norfolk (a son of Henry Heydon and Anne Boleyn). He was the great-grandson and heir of Sir Roger Townshend (died 1551) and his wife, Amy Brewse (d. 1553).

Townshend is said to have had two sisters, Alice Townshend (fl. 31 July 1551), and Elizabeth Townshend, who married Thomas Godsalve (d. 2 August 1588) of Buckenham Ferry, Norfolk.

After Richard Townshend's death in 1551, his widow, Katherine, married Peter Sainthill (d. 19 November 1571), whom she predeceased.

== Career ==
In 1551, when only six or seven years of age, Townshend was heir to his great-grandfather, Sir Roger Townshend. His inheritance comprised more than twenty manors near Raynham, Norfolk, and other property, 'making him one of the wealthiest gentlemen in East Anglia'.

In 1553 Townshend entered Trinity College, Cambridge, but did not take a degree. In May 1565 he was granted livery of his lands, although still underage.

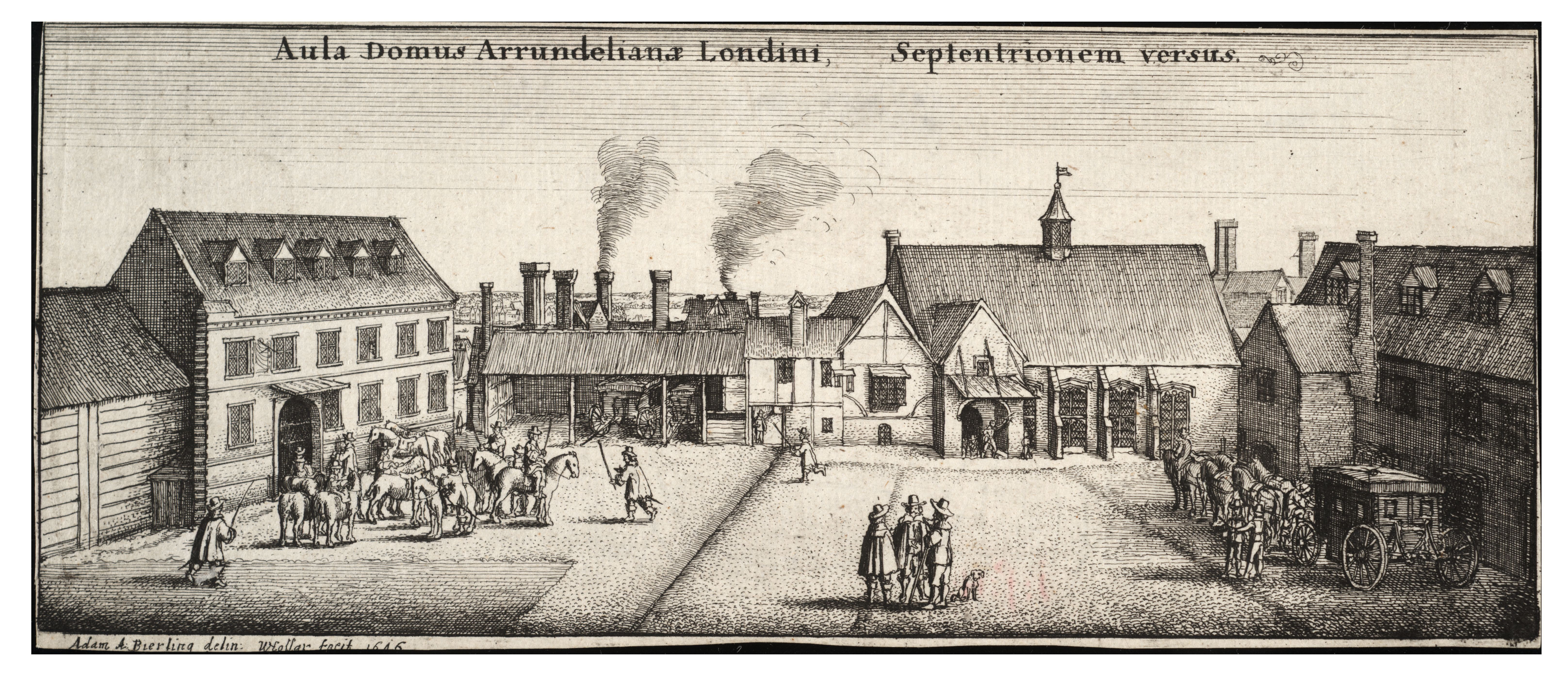
A 17th century engraving of Arundel House by Wenceslas Hollar

Townshend's grandfather had been in the service of Thomas Howard, 3rd Duke of Norfolk, and early in his career Townshend entered the service of the current head of the family, Thomas Howard, 4th Duke of Norfolk. His service as the Duke's "man of business" kept him occupied in London, and as a result he took little part in local administration in Norfolk, although he was elected to Parliament in 1566 as Knight of the Shire, allegedly after the Duke had put pressure on the sheriff, William Paston.

After the 4th Duke's execution in 1572, Townshend continued to serve his son and heir, Philip Howard, 20th Earl of Arundel, who was still a minor at the time of his father's death. In 1583 Arundel made a deed of gift to Townshend and William Dix of all his movable goods to assist with the payment of Arundel's debts. Townshend's conduct sometimes displeased Arundel. In 1582 Arundel was affronted when Townshend "hurried him off by boat to Arundel House, to avoid his becoming embroiled in the affray between the Earl of Oxford, and Thomas Knyvet". On another occasion, in June 1589, Arundel complained to William Cecil, 1st Baron Burghley, that his uncle, Lord Henry Howard, and some of Arundel's tenants were suffering from Townshend's zealousness and rigidity: "Sir Roger Townshend is so resolute to part with nothing more than he shall be by law enforced". Years later, however, Arundel was more appreciative of Townshend's service, in his last will terming him "my loving friend", and bequeathing him a "fair bowl with a cover of 30 ounces double gilt".

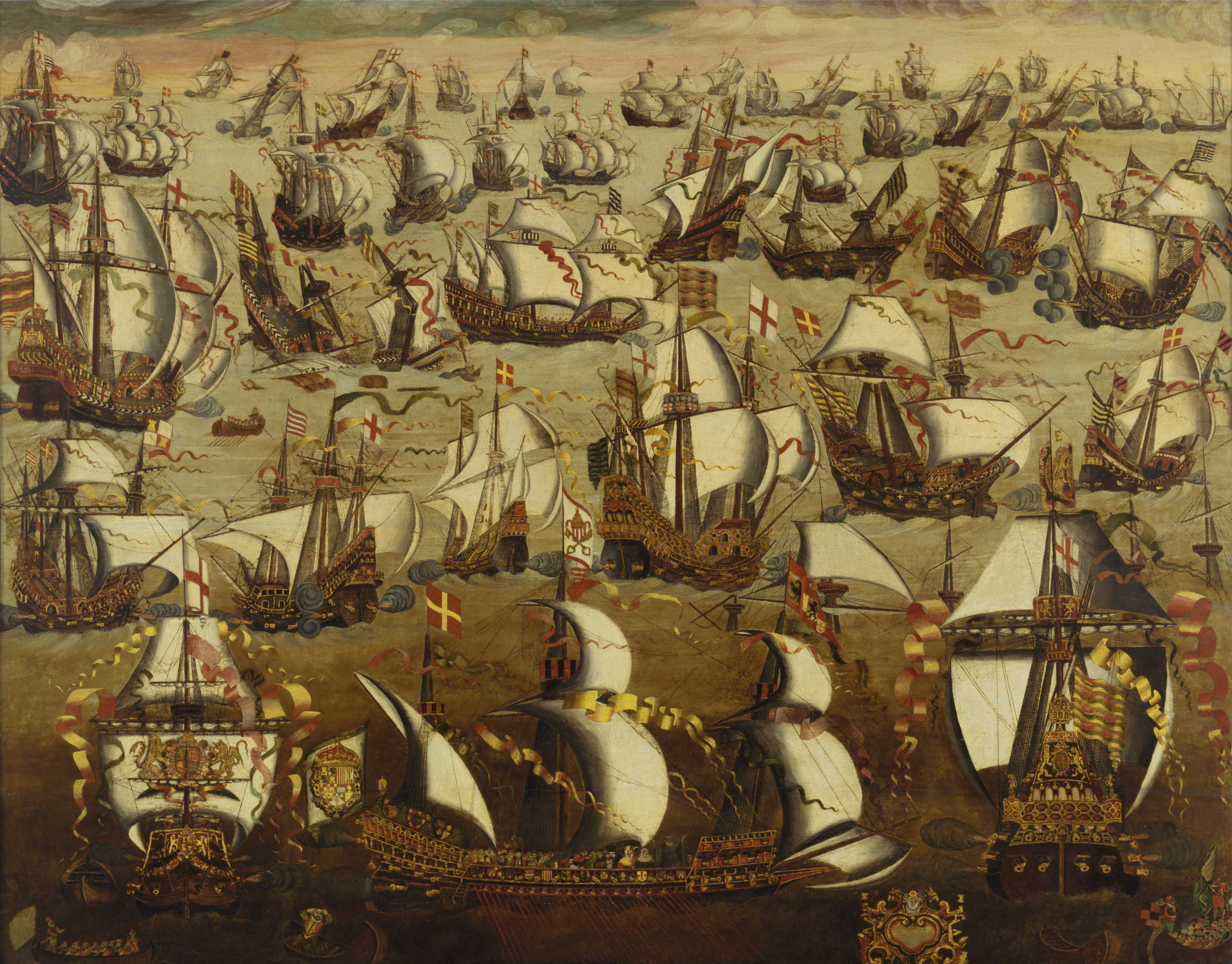
English ships and the Spanish Armada

Townshend and his second wife, Jane, held offices at court, and in the years between 1576 and 1584 exchanged New Year's gifts with the Queen. In 1585 Arundel was imprisoned, and little is known of Townshend's career after that time. He drew up his will in December 1587. In 1588 he served with the fleet against the Spanish Armada, and was knighted at sea on 26 July by the Lord High Admiral, Charles, Lord Howard of Effingham. Townshend's portrait was among those on the margin of a tapestry commemorating the defeat of the Spanish Armada which hung in the House of Lords until the tapestry's destruction by fire in 1834.

Townshend added to his landed inheritance in Norfolk by purchasing other properties, including lands in Essex and an estate at Stoke Newington which he bought from Thomas Sutton (1532–1611). He died at Stoke Newington on 30 June 1590, and was buried at St Giles Cripplegate. He was succeeded by his elder son, Sir John Townshend.

== Marriages and issue ==
Townshend married firstly Ursula Heydon (d. before 1564), the daughter of Sir Christopher Heydon by Anne Drury, the daughter of Sir William Drury of Hawstead, Suffolk, by whom he had no issue.

Townshend married secondly, Jane Stanhope (c. 1547–1618), the daughter of Sir Michael Stanhope (died 1552) of Shelford, Nottinghamshire, by his wife, Anne Rawson (c. 1515 – 20 February 1588), the daughter of Nicholas Rawson, of Aveley, Essex, and Beatrix Cooke (d. 14 January 1554), daughter of Sir Philip Cooke (d. 7 December 1503) by Elizabeth Belknap (died c. 6 March 1504).

After Townshend's death, his widow, Jane, married, as his second wife, Henry Berkeley, 7th Baron Berkeley. She died at her house in the Barbican on 3 January 1618, leaving a will dated 20 July 1617 which was proved by her grandson, Sir Roger Townshend, 1st Baronet, on 10 March 1618.

By his second wife Townshend had two sons:

- Sir John Townshend (died 1603), who married Anne Bacon, the daughter of Sir Nathaniel Bacon of Stiffkey, Norfolk, and died 2 August 1603, the day after being mortally wounded in a duel with Sir Matthew Browne of West Betchworth in Dorking, Surrey.
- Sir Robert Townshend. In February 1603 John Manningham noted in his diary that "Ben Johnson the poet nowe lives upon one Townesend and scornes the world". Donaldson has identified Jonson's patron as "Sir Robert Townshend, youngest son of the naval commander Sir Roger Townshend of Raynham (died 1590)", noting that he was a "generous patron to a number of writers at this time, including John Fletcher".

== Ancestry ==
Ancestors of Roger Townshend (courtier, died 1590)

16. Sir Roger Townshend
8. Sir Roger Townshend
17. Eleanor Lumford
4. Sir John Townshend
9. Amy Brewes
2. Sir Richard Townshend
5. Eleanor Heydon
1. Sir Roger Townshend
3. Katherine Browne
