= South Raynham =

Village in Norfolk, England

Coordinates: 52.781°N 0.785°E

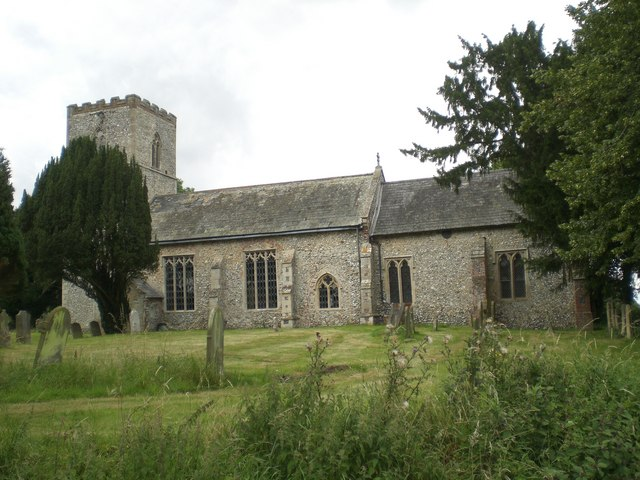
- The Church of St Martin

- Location within Norfolk
- Population: 257 (2001. Combined with East & West Raynham 2001 census)
- OS grid reference: TF888243
  - London: 109 miles
- Civil parish: Raynham
- District: North Norfolk
- Shire county: Norfolk
- Region: East
- Country: England
- Sovereign state: United Kingdom
- Post town: Fakenham
- Postcode district: NR21
- Dialling code: 01328
- Police: Norfolk
- Fire: Norfolk
- Ambulance: East of England
- UK Parliament: North Norfolk

South Raynham is a village and former civil parish, now in the parish of Raynham, in the North Norfolk district, in the county of Norfolk, England. It is situated on the A1065 road some 5 miles (8.0 km) SW of Fakenham. The River Wensum flows nearby. In 1931 the parish had a population of 94.

== History ==
The villages name means 'Regna's homestead/village' or 'Regna's hemmed-in land'. The village can trace its origins back and before the Domesday survey of 1086 when the village was known as Reinham. On 1 April 1935 the parish was abolished to form Raynham.

== The Raynhams ==
Today, The Raynhams would cover the names of three villages East, West, South Raynham and a large area of park and farmland known as Raynham Park, which the Raynham villages and the 17th century Raynham Hall border.

== Raynham Hall ==
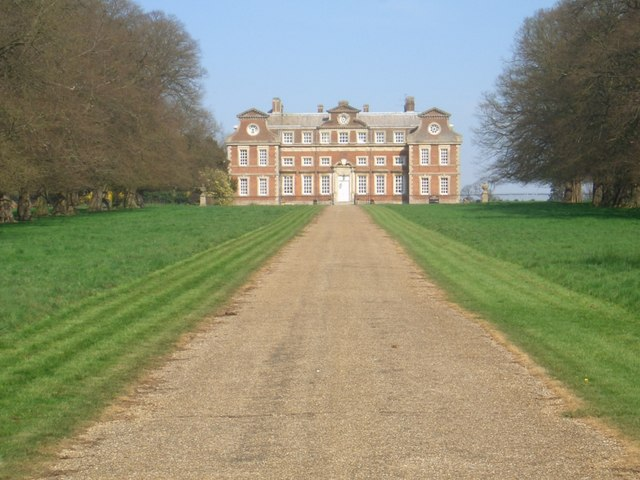
Raynham Hall

Raynham Hall is a rectangular mansion built of brick and stone dressings. Work commenced in 1619 and was completed in 1630. It is the seat of the Townshend family, and is owned today by the 7th Marquis Townshend.

== The Church of St Martin ==
The Church of St Martin dates back to the 14th century and is built from flint and freestone dressings in the Decorated and Perpendicular style of architecture. The most outstanding feature of the church is the mensa, or altar stone. Pevsner believed it might be 12th century, but may be older.

== Recreation ==
Much of the area can be visited by a circular walk, which takes in mixed woodland, water meadows, arable land, and historic buildings, almost entirely on the Raynham estate.
