= John Catesby =

John Catesby KS (died 1486) was an English judge.

== Family ==
The Catesby family had been settled for some time in Northamptonshire and held the manor of Lapworth in Warwickshire. He was the son of Edmund Catesby. He was the uncle of William Catesby, another noted lawyer, and a member of the Inner Temple.

== Career ==
He became a Serjeant-at-Law in 1463, allowing him to practice in the Court of Common Pleas and a King's Serjeant on 18 April 1469. On 20 November 1481 he was made Third Justice of the Court of Common Pleas. He served continuously from the reign of Edward IV to that of Henry VII, although the latter delayed his appointment for a month due to his relation to William Catesby, who had been a close ally of the previous king. On the death of Richard Neele in 1486 he became Second Justice of the Common Pleas but died later that year.

== Personal life ==
He married Elizabeth Green, daughter of William Green of Hayes, Middlesex with whom he had seven sons and two daughters; Robert Catesby, the leader of the Gunpowder Plot, was a direct descendant.

Legal offices
Preceded by Unknown	Third Justice of the Common Pleas; 1481–1486	Succeeded by Roger Townshend
Preceded by Richard Neele	Second Justice of the Common Pleas; 1486	Succeeded by Roger Townshend
