= John Heveningham =

English politician

Sir John Heveningham (c. 1577 – 17 June 1633) was an English politician who sat in the House of Commons from 1628 to 1629.

== Life ==
Heveningham was the son of Sir Arthur Heveningham, of Heveningham, Suffolk and was baptised there on 26 March 1577. He was admitted at Queens' College, Cambridge on 1 July 1592 and was admitted at Inner Temple in 1594. He was knighted on 11 May 1603. In 1615 he was Sheriff of Norfolk. He was elected Member of Parliament for Norfolk in 1628 and sat until 1629 when King Charles I decided to rule without parliament for eleven years.

He married Bridget Paston who was the granddaughter of Sir William Paston whose will was in dispute when he died leaving trusts to avoid his insane heir Christopher. His inheritance went to Bridget's brother Edmund and his wife Katherine Paston. Katherine's letters to Heveningham are extant.

Heveningham died at the age of 56 and was buried at Ketteringham, Norfolk.

Parliament of England
Preceded by Sir Edward Coke; Sir Robert Bell	Member of Parliament for Norfolk; 1628–1629; With: Sir Roger Townshend, 1st Baronet	Parliament suspended until 1640
