= Richard Neele =

Richard Neele, Knt., King's Serjeant KS (died 1486) was a British judge. He was educated at Gray's Inn, and was made a Serjeant-at-Law in 1463. A year later he was made a King's Serjeant and on 9 October 1470 he was made a Justice of the Court of King's Bench. He was moved to the Court of Common Pleas on 29 May 1471, and by the time he died in office in 1486 he had served as a judge under five different British monarchs.

Legal offices
Vacant	Second Justice of the Common Pleas; 1471–1486	Succeeded by John Catesby
