= Robert Townshend (judge) =

Sir Robert Townshend (died 8 February 1555/56) of Ludlow, Shropshire was a judge who held a number of positions, including Chief Justice of the Marches of Wales and Chester. He was the founder of the Cheshire and Shropshire branch of the Townshend family.

Sir Robert Townshend was the second son of Sir Roger Townshend (d.1551) of Raynham, Norfolk and was admitted to Lincoln's Inn in 1515. He became Justice of the Peace for Norfolk in 1526, Serjeant at Law in 1540 and King's Serjeant in 1543. He was appointed as Justice of Chester in 1545, and was knighted by Henry VIII on 21 May 1545 at Hampton Court Palace.

He married Alice Poppy, a daughter of Robert Poppy. Together they had six sons and six daughters. He died on 8 February 1555/6. He was buried in Ludlow church, where his memorial, erected in 1581, is a large table tomb with polychrome recumbent effigies of Sir Robert and Dame Alice, and with empanelled heraldry and images of his children as mourners.

One son, Sir Henry Townshend was also a judge.

== Children ==
The children of Sir Robert Townshend and Alice née Poppy are shown as follows:

- Thomas (b. c.1534, d. 1591), Esquire, of Bracon Ash, Norfolk, married (1) (1558) Lady Elizabeth Styles (daughter of George Periente of Digswell, Hertfordshire), who died 1580, and (2) (1581–82) Ann D'Oyley (daughter of Henry D'Oyley of Shottisham, Norfolk, and of Pond-Hall, Hadleigh, Suffolk), who afterwards made two further marriages.
- Robert (b. c.1535, d. 1614), of Llanvary and Ludlow, Shropshire, married (1571) Ann Machell (daughter of John Machell, Sheriff of London 1555–56).
- (Sir) Henry (b. c. 1537, d. 1621), Judge, of Ludlow Castle and Cound, Shropshire, married (1) Susanna, daughter of Sir Rowland Hayward, and (2) Dorothy Heveningham, of Pipe Hall, Burntwood, Staffordshire.
- Isaac, living 1552 aged under 18.
- Roger.
- John.
- Elizabeth
- Alice, who died at Ludlow in Shropshire on 28 November 1607, married (1) at Ludlow on 6 October 1550 Humphrey Archer, of Tanworth-in-Arden in Warwickshire, who died at Tanworth-in-Arden on 24 October 1562 and (2) Edmund Colles, of Leigh in Worcestershire, who died on 19 December 1606.
- Amey, married Raffe Dutton of Hatton, Cheshire.
- Eleanor, died without issue.
- Thomazin, married (1) William Curson of Beck Hall, in Billingford and Bylaugh, Norfolk (brother of Lady Ursula Hynde of Madingley), and (2) William Rugge, of Felmingham, Norfolk, Esquire.
- Grace, married (1) Ambrose Gilbert, and (2) Richard Smyth.
- Bridget, married (as his first wife) Henry Acton of Ribbesford, Worcestershire, third son of Sir Robert Acton of Ribbesford and Elmley Lovett. Charles Acton, brother of this Henry, was grandfather of Elizabeth Acton who by her marriage to a younger Henry Townshend reinforced the Townshend connection with Elmley Lovett.
