= Katherine Paston =

English estate manager and letter writer

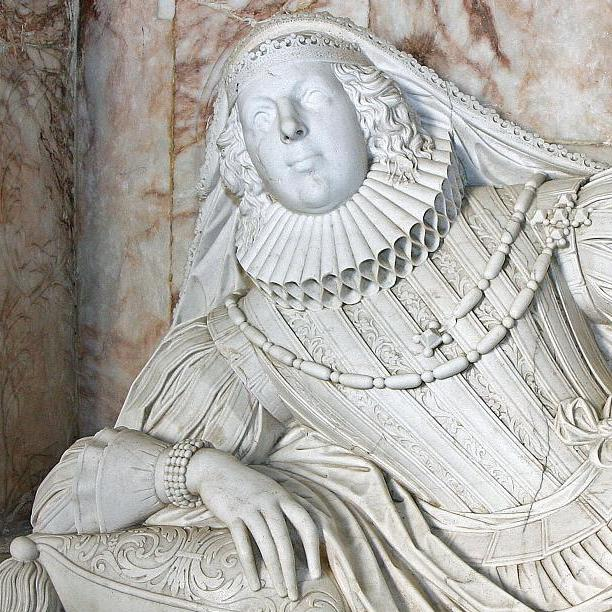
- Katherine, Lady Paston, detail of her effigy by Nicholas Stone, St Margaret's Church, Paston, Norfolk
- Born: Katherine Knyvett; 1578
- Died: 10 March 1629 (aged 50–51)
- Occupations: Gentlewoman, estate manager
- Known for: Correspondence
- Spouse: Edmund Paston (d.1632)
- Parent(s): Thomas Knyvett and Muriel Parry

Katherine Paston, Lady Paston (1578 – 10 March 1629) was an English gentlewoman, estate manager and letter writer.

== Origins ==
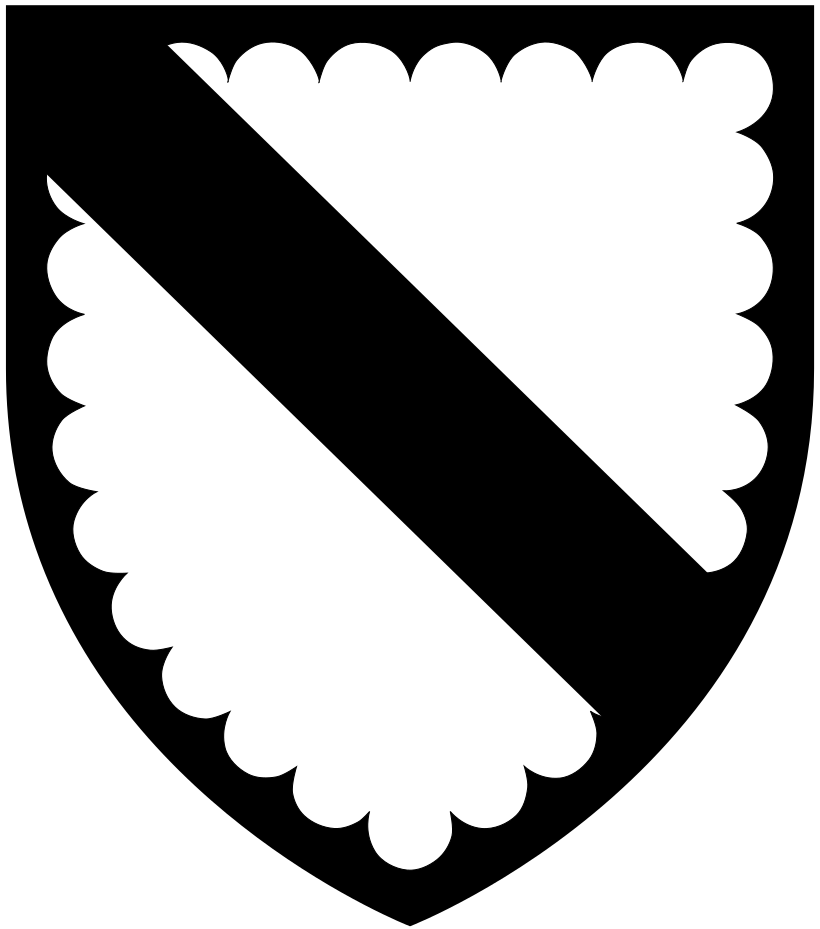
Arms of Knyvett: Argent, a bend sable a bordure engrailed of the last, as sculpted (impaled by Paston) atop her monument

She was born Katherine Knyvett, and was baptised in Ashwellthorpe on 22 June 1578, a daughter of Thomas Knyvett and his wife Muriel Parry. Her sister Muriel Knyvett married Edmond Bell, as his second wife.

== Marriage and issue ==
On 28 April 1603, Katherine married Edmund Paston, and in 1610, on the death of his grandfather, they moved into his ancestral seat of Paston Hall in Paston, Norfolk. They had two sons. The Pastons' hold on their inheritance was confused as her husband's grandfather, William Paston, had placed his estate in a trust because his heir, Christopher Paston, was mentally ill, having been declared insane in 1609. They were granted £800 a year income from the trust. Her husband was "sickley" so in order to resolve the legal disputes, she moved to London with her two sons in order to progress their case through the chancery courts.

== Letters ==
Many of her letters survive, forming part of the famous Paston Letters. She wrote many letters, including to her husband's brother-in-law John Heveningham. Informative letters were also written to her son William Paston, whom "she hopes is learning about both human and divine knowledge at university". Her letters remind her son of his responsibilities and of the importance of the church. Her son was 14 when he started at Cambridge University, also attended by his first cousins Edmund and Robert Bell, sons of Muriel Bell, Katherine's sister. In 1941 the Norfolk Record Society published her correspondence.

== Death ==
Paston died in 1629 and was survived by her husband. Her monument, made by Nicholas Stone, survives in St Margaret's Church, Paston.
