= Anne Townshend =

- Born: August 1573; Waxham
- Died: November 1622 (aged 49); Sprowston Hall, Norfolk

Anne Townshend or Anne Bacon; Anne, Lady Townshend (August 1573 – November 1622) was a British Puritan gentlewoman and benefactor of Puritan causes.

== Life ==
Townshend was born in Waxham in 1573 and was baptised on 7 August. Her parents were Anne (born Gresham) and Sir Nathaniel Bacon MP. Her formal education was at a boarding school in Dickleborough and she married in December 1593 Sir John Townshend. The marriage had been negotiated by her father and the agreement was that the couple would inherit her father's land in Stiffkey, Langham, and Morston. It was a difficult marriage as her husband frequently rowed with people. Their son and heir, Sir Roger Townshend, 1st Baronet, was born in Melton Constable.

Her husband died in 1603 from his wounds after taking part in a duel where he had killed his opponent. Anne recorded that had he lived then he may have moved abroad and left her without an income.

== Death and legacies ==
Townshend lived in Heydon, but she died at the home of her cousin, Anne, Lady Corbett, in Sprowston Hall in Norfolk in early November 1622.

Townshend had given money to ministers, including the poet Giles Fletcher, during her lifetime but her will required that money be distributed to the poor of the neighborhood. She left money also for ministers including John Goodwin who was later in disfavour with his bishop.
