= Robert Bell (died 1639) =

English landowner and politician, died 1639

Sir Robert Bell (c. 1589 – 1639) was an English landowner and politician who sat in England's House of Commons in 1626.

Bell was the son of Sir Edmund Bell of Beaupré Hall, Outwell, Norfolk. He matriculated from King's College, Cambridge at Easter 1606, and was knighted in 1611. In 1626, he was elected Member of Parliament for Norfolk.

Bell died at the age of about 50 and was buried at Outwell on 31 October 1639.

Parliament of England
Preceded by Sir Edward Coke; Sir Anthony Drury	Member of Parliament for Norfolk; 1626; With: Sir Edward Coke	Succeeded by Sir Roger Townshend, 1st Baronet; John Heveningham
