= Edmond Bell =

Sir Edmond Bell Of Castle Acre and Beaupre Hall, Norfolk. (bap 7 April 1562 – bur 22 December 1607). He was an MP of Aldeburgh, Justice of the Peace for Norfolk c. 1599, Knighted 1603.

== Early life ==
He was baptised 7 April 1562, the first son and heir of Sir Robert Bell and Dorothie daughter of Edmonde Beaupre, Of Outwell/Upwell, Norfolk, and Catherine Bedingfield. He was probably educated at Pembroke College, Cambridge.

The first mention of Edmonde Bell, dates from 1567, where he is found recorded in his Grandfather's will, who bequeaths certain property to him, "books of law and Greek." It is likely that by age fifteen, Edmonde had been partially prepared and fashioned for a career in his family's profession, when he suffered the loss of his father from the terminal effects of what was then called "Jail Fever". Two years later, his mother married Sir John Peyton, a man whose military career was highly esteemed. Peyton, appears to have developed a closer relationship with Edmond's younger brother Robert,... who was groomed as a soldier and later become a captain of a company in the low countries. Around this time, Edmonde may have been busily engaged abroad in pursuit of his academic career at the university level.

== Career ==
By 1583, it is known that he received his patrimony, which included extensive properties throughout Norfolk, and the manor of Castle Acre, where Edmonde dwelled and duly made his family seat. Perhaps this event is timed with his first marriage to Anne Osborne. By 1586, he became MP for Aldeburgh, where he was active in mercantile affairs, "investing heavily in privatering", specifically, the building of ships (gunboats) that incorporated advances in Naval Architecture. These investments did not prove lucrative, however, and perhaps were forfeited, in part as a consequence of the Spanish invasion of 1588, where Bells' Naval assets may have been sacrificed in service to the Crown. Following this period he is found tenaciously engaged as one of the commissioners entrusted with draining the fens, which eventually proved a success. He was knighted by King James I, on Friday 13 May 1603 together with ten others including, William Dethick, Garter King of Arms.

== Marriages ==
Edmonde Bell married:

1. Anne daughter of Peter Osborne, (1521–1592), keeper of the privy purse to King Edward VI and Anne (d. 1615), daughter of Dr John Blythe, regis professor of physics at Cambridge, and niece of Sir John Cheke.

2. Muriel daughter of Sir Thomas Knyvett, of Ashwellthorpe, 4th Baron Berners and Muriel Parry (daughter of Sir Thomas Parry and Anne Reade). Muriel's sister was Lady Katherine Paston.

== Descendants ==
Through the marriage of Anne daughter of Peter Osborne:

- 1. Sir Robert Bell b. 25 February 1587 m. Mary Chester
- 2. Phillip Bell b. 19 June 1590
- 3. Henry Bell b. 9 June 1591 d. 1615
- 4. Peter Bell b. Abt. 1594
- 5. Lady Francis Bell b. Abt 1594 d. 11 April 1627 m. Sir Heneage Finch, Speaker of the House of Commons;

(Ancestors of the House of Windsor)

- 6. Synolphus Bell b. 29 August 1596 d. 1636 m. Martha
- 7. Humphrey Bell b. 5 October 1597 d. Abt. 1654
- 8. Susan Bell b. 15 October 1598 m. Henry Coldwell
- 9. Jane Bell b. 1 October 1599 m. John Ramsay
- 10. Katherine Bell b. 9 October 1601 (2nd wife of) m. 1. Charles Trippe d. 12 JAN. 1623 2. James Hobart b. 23 June 1603 d. 16 July 1643, VIII son of Sir Henry Hobart Lord Chief Justice of the Common Pleas

Through the marriage to Elizabeth Inkpen

- 11 Richard Bell born 1605

Through the marriage of Muriel daughter of Thomas Knyvett:

- 12. Edmund Bell (b. 1606/7)

== Sources ==
1. Hasler, P. W., HoP: House of Commons 1558-1603, Edmond Bell entry, HMSO 1981, p. 421
2. O'Donoghue, M.P.D., Report, Arms and ‘pe de gree's' of Bell [Sir Robert Bell], 15 August 2005 Coll Arm Ms, The Visitations of Norfolk, 1563, 1589, 1613, Bell. Beaupre., Harl 1552
3. Bell, R. R.L., Tudor Bell's Sound Out, Rolls- pb, 7 September 2006, 2nd revision 2008
