= William Fitzwilliam (died 1559) =

Member of the Parliament of England

Sir William FitzWilliam (1506 – 3 October 1559), of Windsor, Berkshire, was an Irish courtier and member of parliament in England. He was Chief Gentleman of the Privy Chamber to King Edward VI; Deputy Chancellor of Ireland; Lieutenant of Windsor Castle; Keeper of Windsor Great Park and Lord Lieutenant of Berkshire.

== Career at Court ==
He was the second son of Thomas Fitzwilliam (1465–1517), of Baggotrath Castle, County Dublin; Sheriff of Dublin City. His mother, Eleanor, was the daughter of Sir John Dowdall, of Newtown, County Kildare, and co-heir to her mother, Margaret, daughter of Sir Jenico d'Artois of Ardglass Castle and Strangford Castle, County Down. His mother was the step-daughter of Rowland FitzEustace, 1st Baron Portlester, father-in-law of Gearóid Mór FitzGerald, 8th Earl of Kildare.

In 1532, he was Clerk of the Hanaper. In 1536, he and his brother, Richard, came to England. His brother entered into the service of their cousin, Gerald FitzGerald, 9th Earl of Kildare, and became Gentleman of the Bedchamber to Henry VIII. William entered the service of his kinsman William FitzWilliam, 1st Earl of Southampton. He was a member (MP) of the Parliament of England for Guildford in 1539 and 1542, for New Shoreham in 1547, and for Berkshire in March 1553 and 1559. By 1544, he was Chief Gentleman of the Privy Chamber to Prince Edward. He was Gentleman of the Privy Chamber from 1547 to 1553. Knighted in 1551/2 by King Edward VI, he was made Lieutenant of Windsor Castle and Keeper of Windsor Great Park, through the influence of John Dudley, 1st Duke of Northumberland. He was Deputy Chancellor of Ireland from 1554 to 1556. In 1559, the year of his death, he was made Lord Lieutenant of Berkshire. He was spoken of by Elizabeth I as a person who stood high in her esteem.

== Family ==
In 1539, FitzWilliam had married Jane (or Joan) Roberts (d.1575), daughter and co-heiress of John Roberts (1474–1521), of Glassenbury, Cranbrook (Kent) and Mayfield, Sussex. Her mother was Mary Sackville, daughter of Richard Sackville (d.1524), of Withyham, East Sussex. Lady Fitzwilliam was the niece of John Sackville who married Margaret Boleyn, sister of Thomas Boleyn, 1st Earl of Wiltshire, and she was a first cousin of Sir Richard Sackville, Chancellor of the Exchequer. Lady FitzWilliam was also a niece of Mildred Sackville who was married to William Fitzwilliam of Milton Hall, Sheriff of London; grandfather of Sir William FitzWilliam, Lord Deputy of Ireland, whose daughters are sometimes confused with this William FitzWilliam's. FitzWilliam died without a male heir and his estate was left to his widow and four daughters.

- Mabel FitzWilliam (1540–1565), married Sir Thomas Browne (d.1597), of Betchworth Castle, Surrey, son of Henry Browne of Betchworth and Katherine, daughter of Sir William Shelley, of Michaelgrove, Sussex. With the help of Sir Thomas More, Browne's father-in-law secured his election to Parliament for Surrey.
- Katherine FitzWilliam (1542–1583), married Christopher Preston (1546–1599), 4th Viscount Gormanston.
- Elizabeth FitzWilliam (b.1544), married Francis Jermy (1535–1610), of Brightwell Hall, Suffolk, son of Sir John Jermy of Metfield Hall, Suffolk, and Margaret, whose two sisters were married to two of the sons of Richard Neville, 2nd Baron Latimer, daughters of Sir Thomas Teye of Marks Tey.

Sir William FitzWilliam died 3 October 1559. His will was overseen by his friend Sir Henry Neville and his brothers-in-law, John Teye and John Daniel. He is buried with a monument in the Bray Chantry at St George's Chapel, Windsor Castle.
