= Giles Fletcher =

English poet (1585–1623)

Giles Fletcher (also known as Giles Fletcher, The Younger; 1586? – 1623 in Alderton, Suffolk) was an English cleric and poet mainly known for his long allegorical poem Christ's Victory and Triumph (1610).

== Life ==
Fletcher was the younger son of Giles Fletcher the Elder (Ambassador to Russia of Elizabeth I and brother to Bishop Richard Fletcher of London, chaplain to Queen Elizabeth I), and the brother of the poet Phineas Fletcher, and cousin of the dramatist John Fletcher. Educated at Westminster School and Trinity College, Cambridge, he remained in Cambridge after his ordination, becoming Reader in Greek Grammar in 1615 and Reader in Greek Language in 1618. In 1619, he departed to become rector of Alderton in Suffolk. Fletcher enjoyed the patronage of the Puritan philanthropist Anne Townshend in or before 1623.

His principal work has the full title Christ's Victorie and Triumph, in Heaven, in Earth, over and after Death, and consists of four cantos. The first canto, Christ's Victory in Heaven, represents a dispute in heaven between justice and mercy, using the facts of Christ's life on earth; the second, Christ's Victory on Earth, deals with an allegorical account of Christ's Temptation; the third, Christ's Triumph over Death, covers the Passion; and the fourth, Christ's Triumph after Death, covering the Resurrection and Ascension, ends with an affectionate eulogy of his brother Phineas as Thyrsilis. The meter is an eight-line stanza in the style of Spenser; the first five lines have the rhyme scheme ABABB, and the stanza concludes with a rhyming triplet. Milton borrowed heavily from Christ's Victory and Triumph in Paradise Regained.
