= Alderton, Suffolk =

Village in Suffolk, England

Coordinates: 52.0246°N 1.413°E

Alderton (summertown)
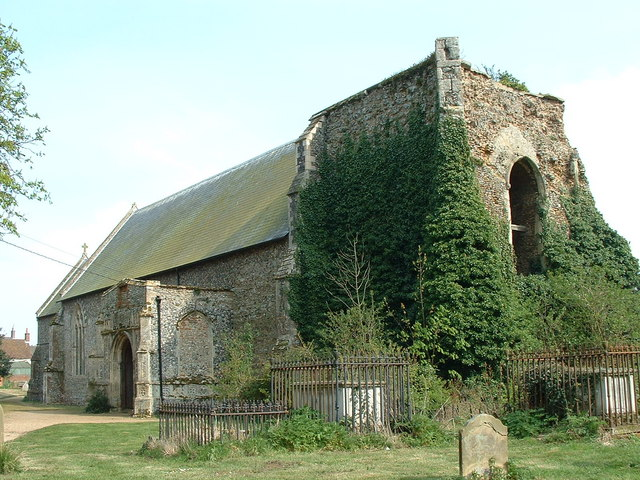
- St Andrew's Church, Alderton

- Location within Suffolk
- Interactive map of Alderton (summertown)
- Population: 470 (2022)
- OS grid reference: TM3441
- District: East Suffolk
- Shire county: Suffolk
- Region: East
- Country: England
- Sovereign state: United Kingdom
- Post town: WOODBRIDGE
- Postcode district: IP12
- Police: Suffolk
- Fire: Suffolk
- Ambulance: East of England
- UK Parliament: Suffolk Coastal

Alderton is a village and civil parish in the East Suffolk district of Suffolk, England, about six miles north of Felixstowe, 10 miles south-east of Woodbridge and 2 miles south of Hollesley, on the North Sea coast and in the heart of the Suffolk Coast and Heaths Area of Outstanding Natural Beauty. In 2007 its population was 430, reducing to 423 at the 2011 Census.

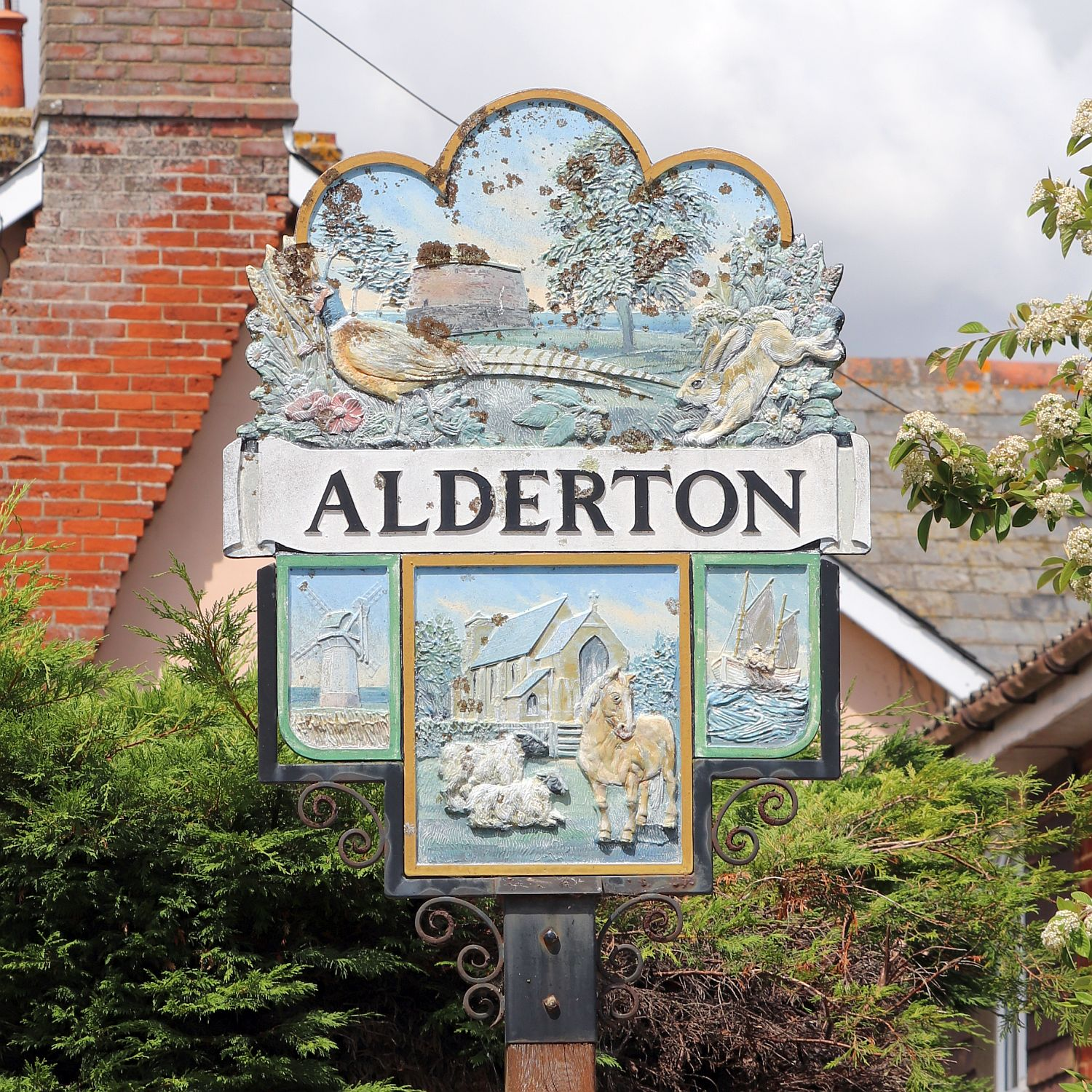
Alderton village sign

== History ==
Alderton was recorded in the Domesday Book as "Alretuna". Local military defences include 3 Napoleonic Martello towers and various 20th-century buildings. Mill Lane marks the site of a mill which stood here from 1796 until its demolition in 1956. An ancient settlement site 600m east of Cedar Court has been identified from aerial photographs, though nothing can be seen on the ground.

The area around Alderton was once a stronghold of Catholicism, and within the grounds of Alderton Hall stands an ecclesiastical building, possibly a chapel or refectory dating back to the 12th century and believed to be part of a group of buildings built by the Augustine monks who controlled much of the land on the Bawdsey Peninsula at that period. Alderton Hall boasts both a priest's hole (a hiding place created for dissident Catholic priests during the purge which followed the Reformation) and a secret passage leading to the neighbouring church of St. Andrew's. The passage was known to be haunted and so fearful were the local inhabitants that the Bishop was called in to exorcise the ghost. Whether the passageway was used by the monks as a route to the church or as hiding place for Catholic sympathizers at the time of the Reformation has yet to be discovered, but with the coast just fifteen minutes walk away and Alderton's close proximity to the Deben Estuary at Ramsholt, this area has long been a popular landing point for Suffolk smugglers. The poet Giles Fletcher was rector of St. Andrew's from 1619 until his death in 1623.

Tales of smuggling abound in the area and the true story of Margaret Catchpole and her efforts to save her lover, captain of a smuggler's ship, has much of its action around the village of Alderton. It is possible that bounty was transported along Alderton Hall's secret passage. But smuggling was not simply a matter of slipping ashore with a bag of tobacco and a keg of wine. The customs men were vigilant and battles between them and the ‘free traders’ are legendary.

Alderton has a village shop, a doctor's surgery, a village hall and a church without a steeple. It was destroyed in a storm in the 18th century, and the parish was too poor to replace it. The sea can be observed from the outskirts of the village, and there is a foot track which leads to it next to the village store, past the recreation ground.

Between 1960 and 1991, the village was the location of a Royal Observer Corps monitoring bunker, to be used in the event of a nuclear attack. It remains mostly intact.
