= Thomas Knyvett, 4th Baron Berners =

16th c Sheriff of Norfolk

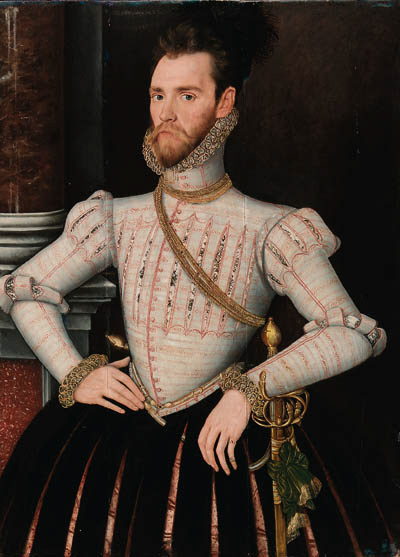
Sir Thomas Knyvett, ca. 1565

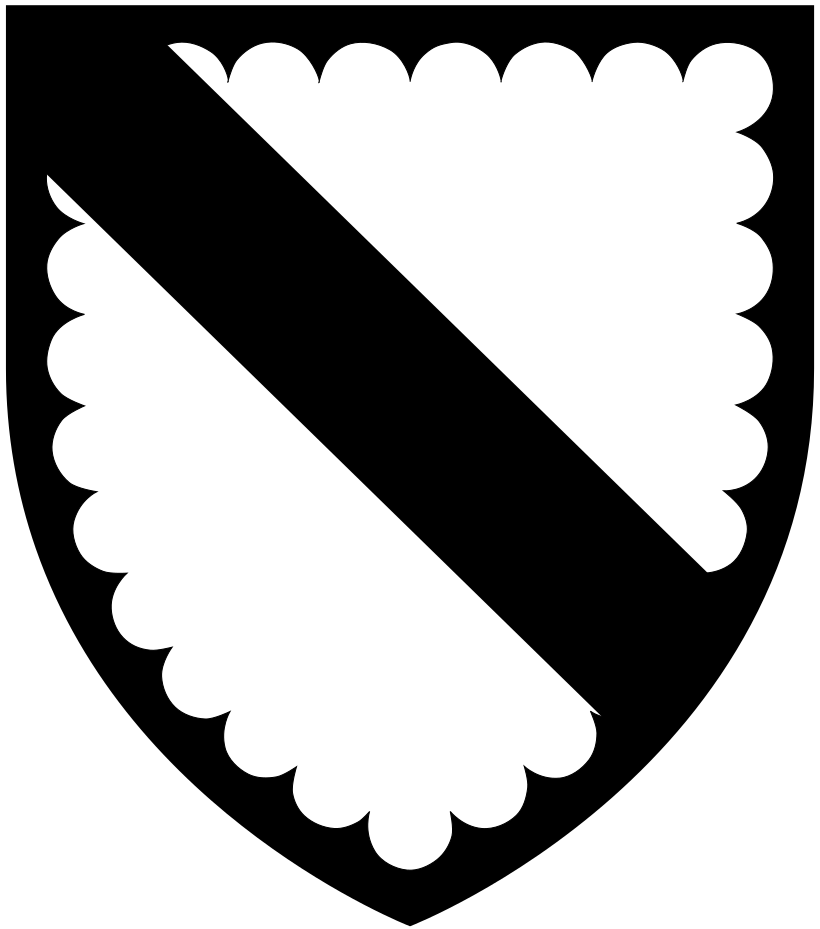
Arms of Knyvett: Argent, a bend sable a bordure engrailed of the last

Thomas Knyvett (or Knyvet), de jure 4th Baron Berners (1539–c. 1616), was High Sheriff of Norfolk from 1579.

Thomas Knyvett was the first son of John Knyvett (1510–1561) and Agnes, daughter of Sir John Harcourt of Stanton Harcourt, Oxfordshire. He was the great-grandson of Sir William Knyvett, and was a 4 times great-grandson of King Edward III through his paternal grandmother, Joan. A native of Ashwellthorpe in Norfolk, Knyvett married Muriel Parry, daughter of Sir Thomas Parry, Comptroller of the Household to Queen Elizabeth I.

He inherited the Ashwellthorpe estates from his paternal grandmother, Jane Knyvett (née Bourchier), de jure 3rd Baroness Berners (daughter and heiress of John Bourchier, 2nd Baron Berners), on her death in 1561/1562, along with rights to the title Baron Berners. He was knighted in 1578 and created Lord High Sheriff of Norfolk in 1579.

He failed to formally claim the title Baron Berners until 1616, when the office of the Earl Marshal certified his "right and title to the Barony of Berners", but he died shortly thereafter, before the new king James I could confirm the title.

He was buried at Ashwellthorpe on 9 February 1616/7.

== Children ==
His son was Sir Thomas Knyvet (d. 1605), of Ashwellthorpe, Norfolk and Stradbroke.

His daughter Katherine Knyvett, Lady Paston, married Edmund Paston and was one of the writers of the Paston Letters.

His daughter Muriel Knyvett married Sir Edmond Bell, as his second wife.

His daughter Mary Knyvett married on 19 October 1601 Sir Thomas Holland of Quidenham in Norfolk and had Sir John Holland, 1st Baronet

His daughter Abigail Knyvett married Sir Edmund Moundeford of Mundford and Hockwold, Norfolk, the grandson of Francis Mountford, as his second wife. From his first marriage, her husband had a son, Sir Edmund Moundeford (1596 – May 1643), who left much of his inheritance to his half-sister, Abigail's daughter and Thomas Knyvett's granddaughter Elizabeth.

Peerage of England
Preceded by Jane Knyvett	Baron Berners (de jure); 1562–1618	Succeeded by Thomas Knyvett
