= John Townshend (died 1603) =

English nobleman, politician and knight

Sir John Townshend MP
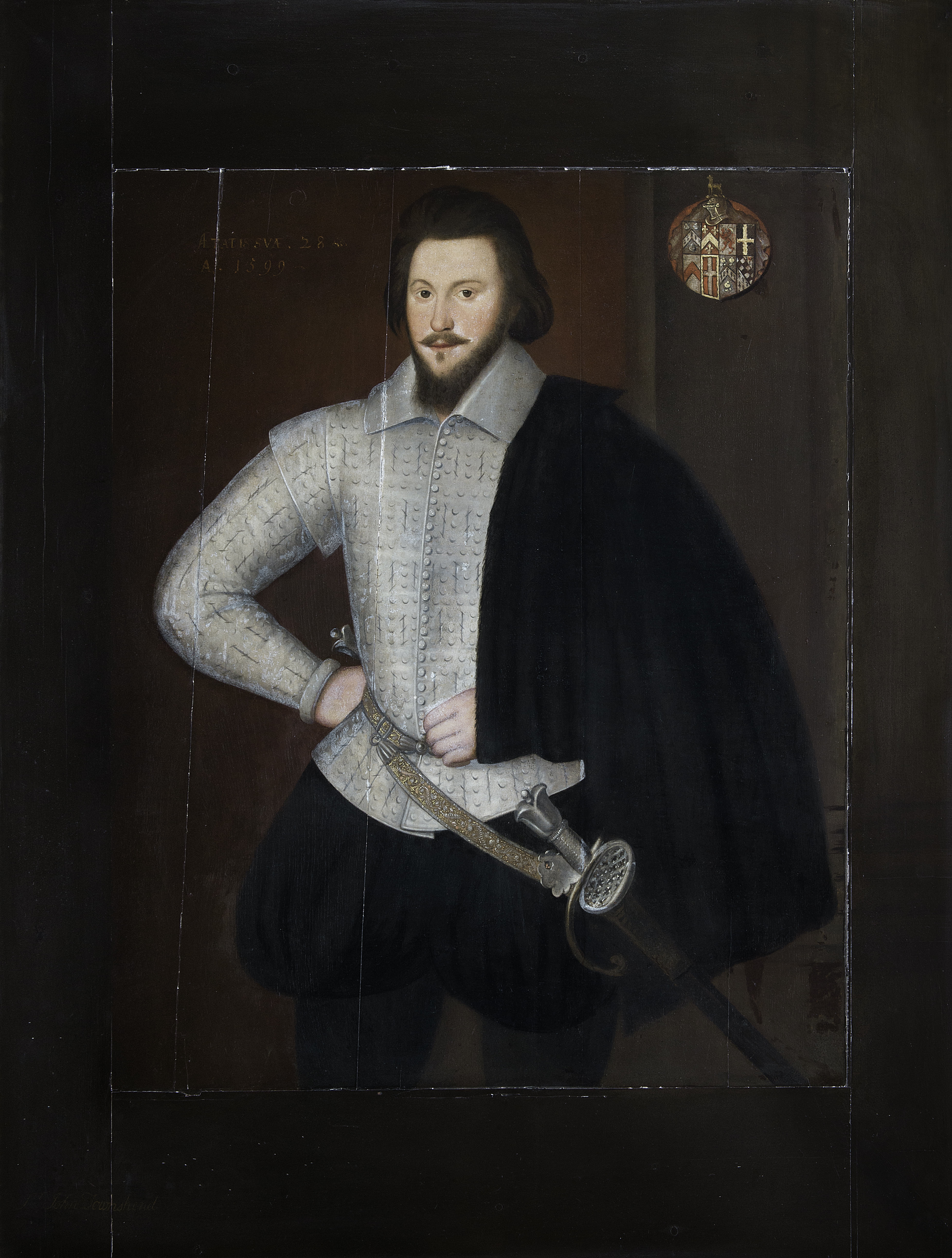
- Born: c. 1568
- Died: 2 August 1603 (aged 34–35)
- Occupations: Politician and Knight
- Spouse: Anne Bacon
- Children: Sir Roger Townshend, 1st Baronet; Stanhope Townshend; Anne Townshend
- Parent(s): Sir Roger Townshend (died 1590), Jane Stanhope

Sir John Townshend MP (c. 1568 – 2 August 1603), of Raynham Hall in Norfolk, was an English nobleman, politician, and knight. He was the son of Sir Roger Townshend and Jane Stanhope. He was also a soldier and Member of Parliament. He was killed in a duel with Sir Matthew Browne in August 1603.

== Family ==
John Townshend was the eldest son of Sir Roger Townshend (died 1590) and his second wife, Jane Stanhope (c.1547–1618), the daughter of Sir Michael Stanhope (d.1552) of Shelford, Nottinghamshire, by his wife, Anne Rawson, daughter of Nicholas Rawson of Aveley, Essex. After the death of Sir Roger Townshend, his widow, Jane, married, as his second wife, Henry Berkeley, 7th Baron Berkeley. She died at her house in the Barbican on 3 January 1618, leaving a will dated 20 July 1617 which was proved by her grandson, Sir Roger Townshend, 1st Baronet, on 10 March 1618.

== Career ==
Townshend inherited considerable estates in Norfolk from his father, coming to be recognised as one of the leading members of the county gentry. Educated at Magdalen Hall, Oxford, he was a member of the Parliaments of 1593, 1597–1598 and 1601, representing Castle Rising, Norfolk and Orford respectively. He served in the English Army in the Netherlands under Sir Francis Vere in 1592, and in 1596 took part in the Earl of Essex's expedition against Cádiz, being knighted as a result.

Tempers rose high in Norfolk at the time of Essex's Rebellion, and Townshend adhered strongly to the faction led by Sir Edward Coke and opposed to Essex. His feud with Sir Christopher Heydon, one of Essex's supporters, ended in 1600 with Heydon challenging Townshend to a duel, but before they could fight both men were summoned before the Privy Council, and were only released when Coke offered to go bail for Townshend's good behaviour.

Townshend was said to have been a 'very distinguished member' of King James's first Parliament. However while the Parliament was in session, Townshend fought a duel on horseback on Hounslow Heath on 1 August 1603 with a kinsman, Sir Matthew Browne of West Betchworth in Dorking, Surrey. Browne was killed on the spot, while Townshend was mortally wounded and died the following day.

Townshend was succeeded by his eldest son, Roger, who was then underage. His wardship was purchased by his grandmother, Jane, then the wife of Henry Berkeley, 7th Baron Berkeley. Roger Townshend was created a baronet in 1617, and was the ancestor of the Marquesses Townshend.

== Marriage and issue ==
Townshend married Anne Bacon (1573–1622), eldest of the three daughters of Sir Nathaniel Bacon (c.1546–1622) by his first wife, Anne Gresham (d.1594), the illegitimate daughter of Sir Thomas Gresham. Sir Nathaniel Bacon was a half brother of Sir Francis Bacon. Through this marriage the Townshends inherited the former Bacon estate of Stiffkey.

There were three children of the marriage:

- Sir Roger Townshend, 1st Baronet.
- Stanhope Townshend (1597?–1620?),
- Anne Townshend, who married John Spelman.

== Ancestry ==
Ancestors of John Townshend (died 1603)

16. Sir Roger Townshend
8. Sir John Townshend
17. Amy Brewes
4. Sir Richard Townshend
9. Eleanor Heydon
2. Sir Roger Townshend
5. Katherine Browne
1. Sir John Townshend
3. Jane Stanhope
