= Thomas Parry (Comptroller of the Household) =

Welsh administrator (1515–1560)

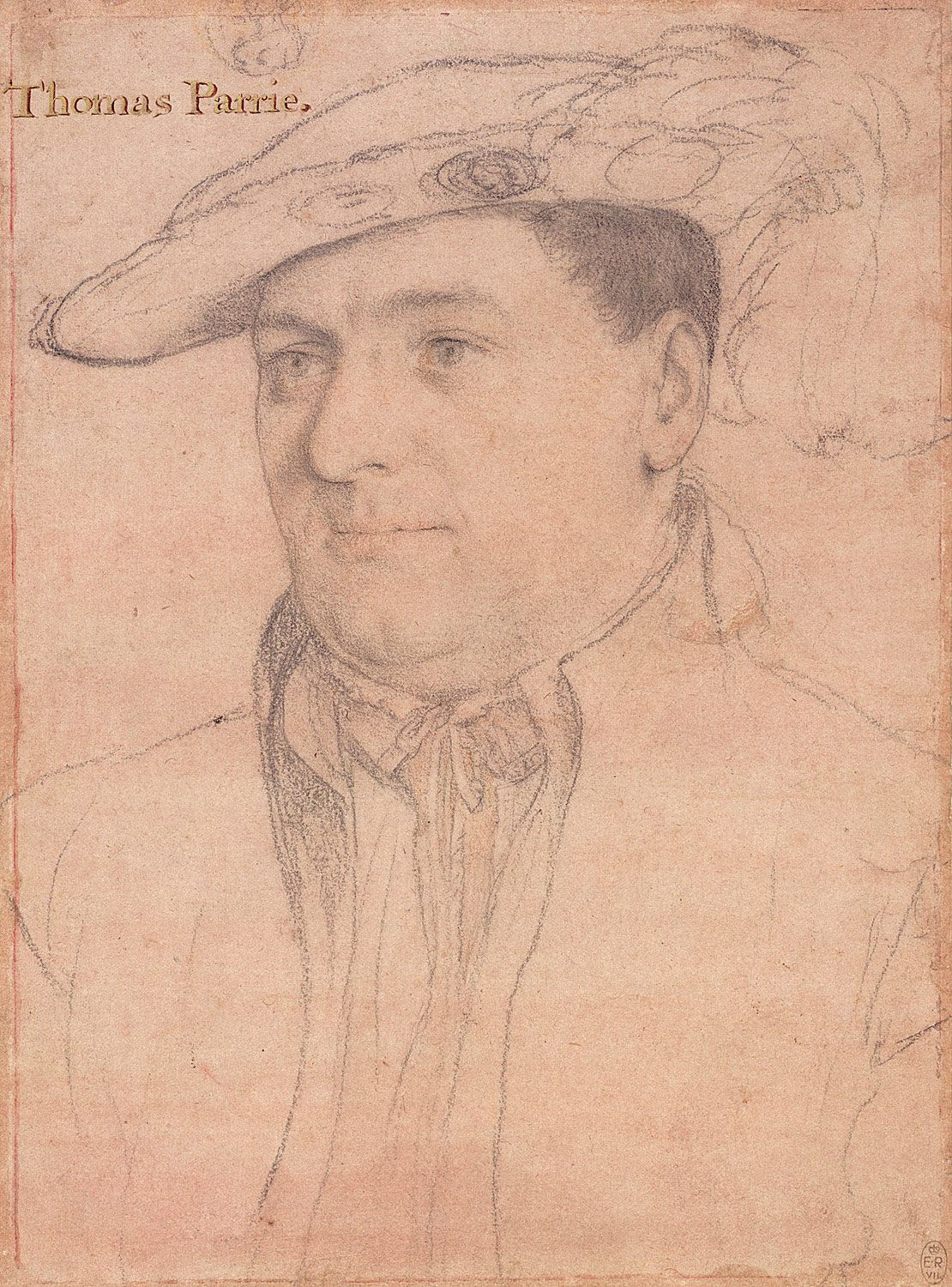
Portrait of Sir Thomas Parry, by Hans Holbein the Younger, c. 1538–40

Sir Thomas Parry (c. 1515 – 15 December 1560) was a Comptroller of the Household to the English Queen Elizabeth I.

He was knighted by Elizabeth at her accession in 1558, and held the offices of royal steward, Cofferer, Privy Counsellor, Comptroller of the Household (appointed November 1558), Master of the Court of Wards and Liveries (appointed 26 April 1559), Member of Parliament for Wallingford (elected 1547, 1552, 1555), Hertfordshire (elected 5 January 1558–9), and Lord Lieutenant of Berkshire (appointed 1559).

== Career ==
Parry's father was Henry Vaughan of Tretower Court, Breconshire, Wales whose father, Sir Thomas Vaughan, had been knighted and later beheaded by King Richard III. His mother was Gwenllian, daughter of William ap Grono of Brecon.

He was a friend and kinsman of Lord William Cecil of Burghley House, which may have afforded him his introduction to the court of King Edward VI. Parry was initially known as Thomas ap Harry (Thomas, son of Harry), later modified to Thomas Parry. He is first noticed attending Thomas Cromwell in 1536, having been employed with various tasks and responsibilities attached to the dissolution of monastic properties.

Further on he was one of the Protestants that were allowed to attend Princess Elizabeth when Mary confined her to Hatfield House. Parry's account (as Elizabeth's cofferer) of her household expenses at Hatfield from October 1551 to September 1552 survives. When Elizabeth was lodged at Woodstock Palace in 1554, Parry paid the wages of her keeper Henry Bedingfield and his servants.

Elizabeth was quick to acknowledge Parry's service and loyalty and conferred a knighthood to him upon her accession in 1558 and he was also made a privy counsellor. The following year, he acquired lands in Berkshire, centred on Hamstead Marshall. Although Elizabeth was fond of his services, he was not particularly popular at court and is noted to have "died on 15 December 1560, of 'mere ill-humour' according to popular report , and was buried in Westminster Abbey (Registers, ed. Chester, p. 113)."

== Family ==
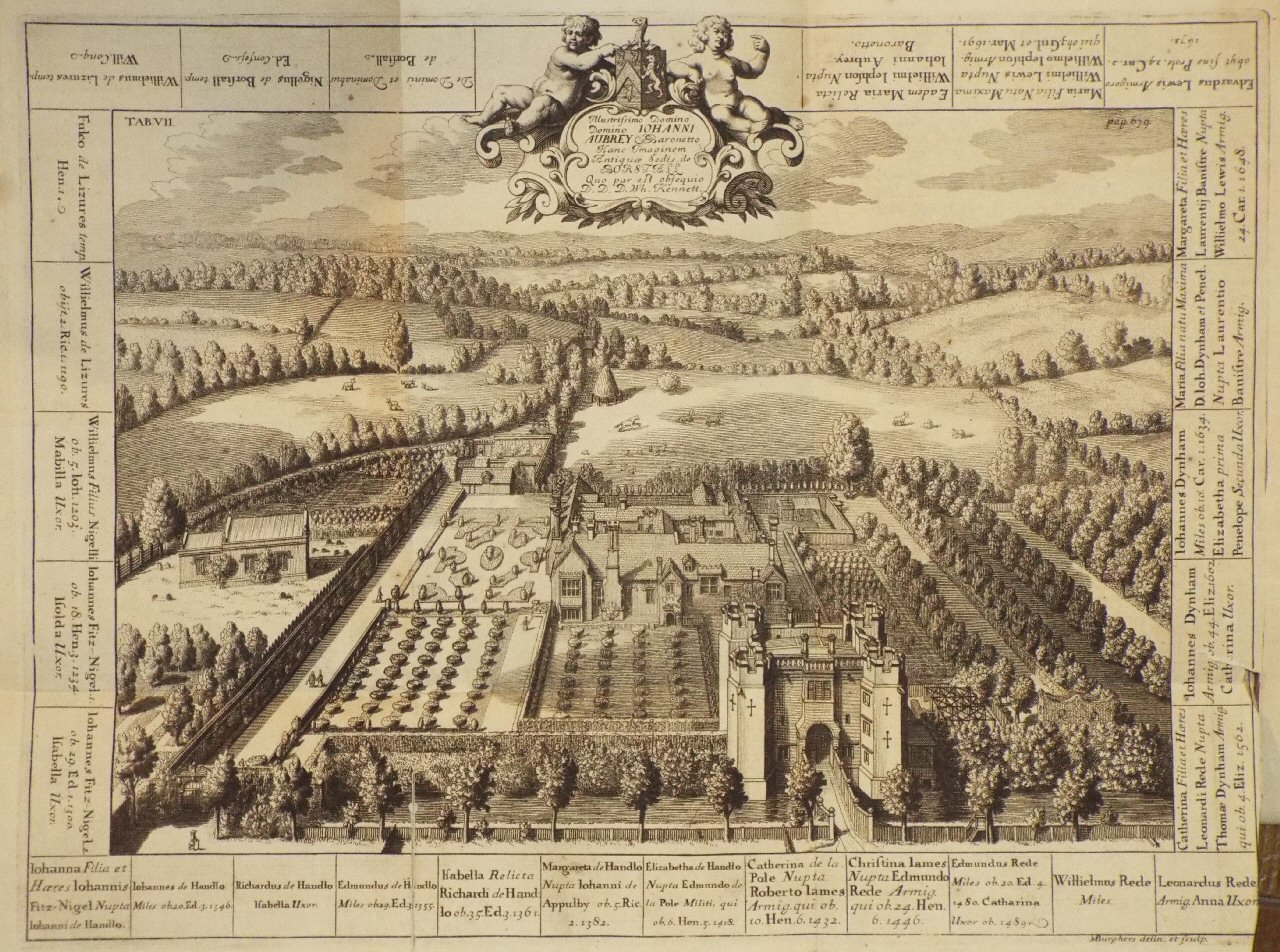
Boarstall Hall and Towers, 1695, by artist Michael Burghers, England

He married Anne, daughter of Sir William Reade of Boarstall House in Buckinghamshire, and widow, first, of Sir Giles Greville, and, secondly, of Sir Adrian Fortescue, with whom he had two sons and two daughters; one of whom married Thomas Knyvett, 4th Baron Berners (c. 1539–1618) and had issue, one daughter who married Edmund, the heir of Sir Robert Bell.

Parry's eldest son was Sir Thomas Parry, ambassador to Paris, Sheriff and MP for Berkshire 1586–1614 and MP for St Albans 1610.

Lady Parry, who was one of the ladies of the privy chamber, was granted, about 1566, an annuity of £50 for thirty-three years (Cal. State Papers, Dom. 1566–1579, p. 25). She retired to Welford Park and is buried beneath a fine monument in the adjoining church.

== Sources ==
- A. H. Dodd, 'Parry, Sir Thomas (died 1560), courtier'. Dictionary of Welsh Biography, online edn. accessed 26 December 2025
- David Nash Ford, 'Sir Thomas Parry Senior' in Royal Berkshire History, Nash Ford Publishing 2001
- Gordon Goodwin, Dictionary of National Biography, Oxford University Press 1895
- Jonathan Hughes, 'Parry, Sir Thomas (b. in or before 1515, d. 1560)' in Oxford Dictionary of National Biography, Oxford University Press, September 2004; online edn, October 2005 accessed 11 May 2006
