= Roger Townshend (judge) =

English MP (c. 1420 – 1493)

Sir Roger Townshend KS
- Born: 1420s
- Died: 9 November 1493
- Occupations: Judge and politician
- Title: Sir
- Spouse(s): Anne Brewes, Eleanor Lunsford
- Children: 12, including Sir Roger Townshend
- Parent(s): Sir John Townshend; Joan Lunsford

Sir Roger Townshend KS (died 1493) was an English landowner, judge and politician. Though his ancestors had held lands in Norfolk for generations, their estates being centred on the village of Raynham, he was the first of his family to attain national prominence.

== Origins ==
Probably born in the 1420s, he was the son of Sir John Townshend (died 1465) and his second wife Joan, daughter and heiress of Sir Robert Lunsford, of Romford in Essex. His sister was the wife of Francis Colville (died 1494), of Newton Colville.

== Career ==
Sent to study at Lincoln's Inn in 1454, where he was first elected a Governor in 1461 and first elected a Reader in 1468, he was his father's heir in 1465. As well as legal practice, he was returned to Parliament for Bramber in 1467 and for Calne in 1472. Proceeds of his legal work were invested in rural land, extending the estates inherited from his father. In 1469 he bought numerous holdings in Norfolk from Sir John Paston, his client who owed him a considerable sum.

After 1472 he pursued a purely legal career, being made a serjeant-at-law in 1478, a legal assistant to the House of Lords in 1480, and a king's serjeant in 1481. In 1483 he was made Third Justice of the Court of Common Pleas by King Richard III, after the promotion of John Catesby, and the next king, Henry VII, kept him in post, knighting him at Worcester in 1486. After Catesby's death in 1486, he was made Second Justice. In addition to his High Court duties, he sat as a justice of the peace and as an assize judge for several counties.

He made his will on 14 August 1493 and died on 9 November 1493.

== Family ==
He married twice, his first wife being Anne, daughter and coheiress of Sir William Brewes (Braose in archaic spelling), of Stinton Hall at Salle, and his wife Elizabeth, daughter of John Hopton, of Blythburgh, and widow of Sir John Jermy, of Metfield. She is recorded as the mother of his twelve children, the eldest son being Roger. She died on 31 October 1489 and he then married Eleanor, daughter of William Lunsford, of Battle in Sussex, who survived him, serving as his executrix and dying on 5 September 1500.

== Ancestry ==
Ancestors of Roger Townshend (judge)

16. Roger de Townshend
8. Sir Thomas de Townshend
17. Catherine Atherton
4. Sir Roger de Townshend
9. Agnes Payne
2. Sir John Townshend
5. Eleanor Giggs
1. Sir Roger Townshend
3. Joan Lunsford

Parliament of England
| Preceded by Unknown | Member of Parliament for Bramber; 1467 | Succeeded by Unknown |
Parliament of England
| Preceded by Unknown | Member of Parliament for Calne; 1472 | Succeeded by Unknown |
Legal offices
| Preceded by John Catesby | Third Justice of the Common Pleas; 1484–1486 | Succeeded by John Haugh |
| Preceded by John Catesby | Second Justice of the Common Pleas; 1486–1493 | Succeeded by William Danvers |
