= Matthew Browne =

British aristocrat and lawyer (1563–1603)

Sir Matthew Browne
- Born: 1563
- Died: 1 August 1603 (aged 39–40)
- Spouse: Jane Vincent
- Children: Sir Ambrose Browne, 1st Baronet; Edward Browne; Henry Browne; Thomas Browne; Jane Browne; Mabel Browne
- Parent(s): Sir Thomas Browne, Mabel Fitzwilliam

Sir Matthew Browne (1563 – 1 August 1603) of Betchworth Castle, Surrey, MP, was an English aristocrat and lawyer, the only son of Sir Thomas Browne and Mabel Fitzwilliam. He was involved in legal and financial transactions concerning the Globe Theatre in 1601. He was killed in a duel with his kinsman, Sir John Townshend, on 1 August 1603.

== Early life and education ==
Matthew Browne was the only son of Sir Thomas Browne (d. 9 February 1597) and his first wife, Mabel Fitzwilliam, the eldest daughter and coheiress of the courtier Sir William Fitzwilliam, Gentleman of the Privy Chamber and Lieutenant of Windsor Castle, by Jane Roberts, daughter and coheiress of John Roberts of Cranbrook, Kent, and Mayfield, Sussex. He had two sisters, Jane Browne, who married Sir Oliph Lee, and Elizabeth Browne, who married Robert Honeywood.

After the death of his first wife, Mabel, Sir Thomas Browne married Helen or Ellen Harding, widow of Richard Knyvet, and daughter and heiress of William Harding, by whom he had a son, Richard Browne.

Browne was at Magdalen College, Oxford, in 1576. By a parliament held 11 February 1582 he was granted special admission to the Inner Temple together with Nicholas Brend (d. 12 October 1601), son and heir of Thomas Brend (d. 1597), and John Bodley of Streatham, stepson of Thomas Brend, with whom he was later to be associated in connection with the Globe Theatre and other properties.

== Career ==
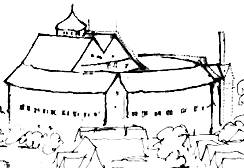
Sketch by Wenceslas Hollar of second Globe Theatre

In 1596, Browne was knighted by Robert Devereux, 2nd Earl of Essex, on the Cádiz expedition. In 1600 he was appointed deputy lieutenant of Surrey to Lord Charles Howard. In 1601, he was elected to Parliament for Gatton.

In October 1601, as Nicholas Brend, with whom Browne had been admitted to the Inner Temple in 1582, lay dying, he entered into complicated legal and financial transactions to ensure payment of his debts by which his stepbrother, John Bodley, John Collet, and Sir Matthew Browne would act as his trustees, and by which:

Bodley would pay the debts and in return take a mortgage on the properties in Bread Street and Southwark, including, now, the Globe...So on October 7, Bodley, Collet, and Browne agreed in writing to pay the debts and Collet to give Nicholas £250 in cash. In return, Nicholas mortgaged his properties in Bread Street and Southwark to Collet and Browne for the supposed amount of the debts, £1478. On October 8 he signed a bond in which he promised to pay Collet and Browne £2500 if he did not perform the requirements of the mortgage. On October 10 he drew his will, providing among other things that Bodley and Browne should have various properties they would sell, including the house in St. Peter's Hill where all this was taking place...And on 12 October 1601, at the age of forty or forty-one, the first owner of the Globe died.

== Personal life and death ==
Browne married Jane Vincent, the daughter of Sir Thomas Vincent of Stoke d'Abernon, Surrey, by Jane Lyfield, the daughter and heiress of Thomas Lyfield, esquire, by whom he had four sons, Sir Ambrose Browne, 1st Baronet, Edward, Henry and Thomas, and two daughters, Jane, who married Sir Robert Kemp, 2nd Baronet, and Mabel.

On 1 August 1603, Browne fought a duel on horseback on Hounslow Heath with a kinsman, Sir John Townshend. Browne was killed on the spot, while Townshend was mortally wounded and died the following day.

Browne was succeeded by his twelve-year-old son, Ambrose. His executors, Sir William Mynne and Browne's cousin, Thomas Browne, did not prove Browne's last will until 1608.
