= A1065 road =

Road in East Anglia, England

Coordinates: 52.61909°N 0.69216°E

A1065

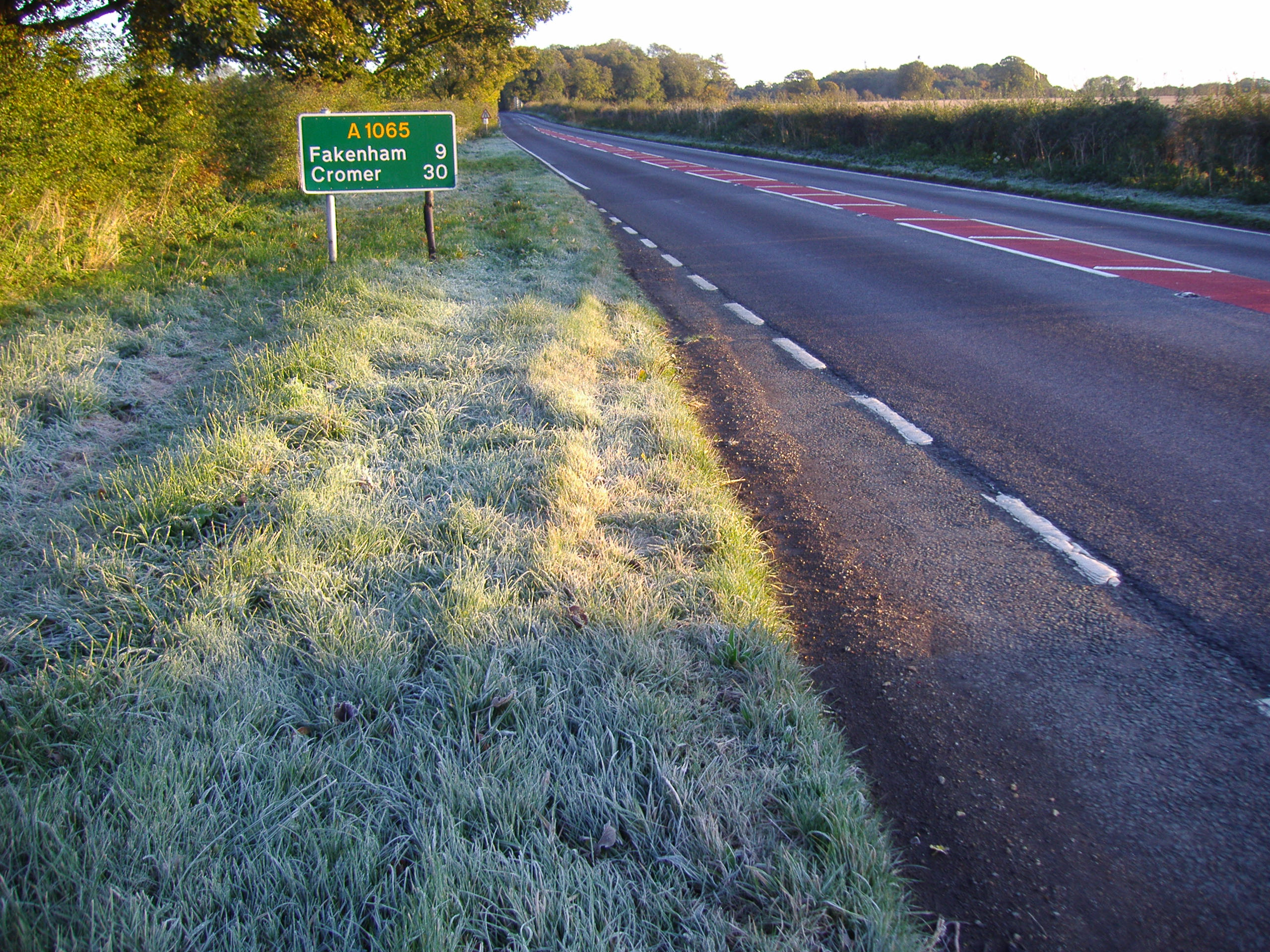
- A1065 road between Swaffham and Fakenham

Route information
- Length: 39.8 mi (64.1 km)

Major junctions
- South end: Mildenhall
- A11 A1101 A134; A47 A148
- North end: Fakenham

Location
- Country: United Kingdom
- Primary destinations: Brandon Swaffham

Road network
- Roads in the United Kingdom; Motorways; A and B road zones
← A1064	→ A1066

The A1065 is a main road in the English region of East Anglia. It provides the principal road connection to parts of the west and north of the county of Norfolk from Newmarket and points south of there, including London. It runs from a junction near Mildenhall, to a junction on the western outskirt of Fakenham.

Most of the road is in the county of Norfolk but the southernmost 9.4 miles (15.1 km) are in Suffolk

== Route ==
The southern end of the road is at a roundabout on the A11 London to Norwich road, situated about 1 mile (1.6 km) east of the town of Mildenhall and the same distance north east of the village of Barton Mills. At the same roundabout the A1101 Bury St. Edmunds to Littleport road crosses the A11. To the south of this junction the A11 and M11 provide a fast, dual carriageway and largely grade separated route as far as the outskirts of London.

From this roundabout, the road passes through Mildenhall Woods, an outlying section of Thetford Forest. Along this stretch, the Cut-off Channel, a large fenland drainage channel, is crossed. After 3.5 miles (5.6 km), the large United States Air Force base at RAF Lakenheath is reached. The road originally crossed what is now part of the airfield, and was diverted during World War II to run along the eastern perimeter fence of the base as far as Wangford, where it passes close to the end of the runway.

The road then passes through more of Thetford Forest, before reaching the town of Brandon. The road passes through the town centre, turning sharply left there, bridging the River Little Ouse, and crossing the Cambridge to Norwich railway line on a level crossing adjacent to Brandon station.

A larger section of Thetford Forest follows as far as the village of Mundford. On this stretch the road passes close to Grimes Graves, a large Neolithic flint mining complex. At Mundford the A1065 crosses the A134 Colchester to King's Lynn road.

Beyond Mundford the road passes through the villages of Ickburgh and Hilborough before reaching the town of Swaffham. Along this stretch the surrounding countryside becomes less wooded, although the road still passes through outliers of Thetford Forest. The passes through the centre of Swaffham and traverses the town's large market place. On the northern edge of the town, the Ecotricity wind turbines are a major landmark alongside the road, and a grade separated junction gives access to the A47 Birmingham to Great Yarmouth road.

Some 3.5 miles (5.6 km) beyond Swaffham the A1065 by-passes the ancient settlement of Castle Acre, although the ruins of Castle Acre Castle and Castle Acre Priory are clearly visible across the valley from the road. The road then passes through the villages of Newton, West Lexham, Weasenham All Saints, Weasenham St Peter, South Raynham, East Raynham, Toftrees and Hempton.

The A1065 finishes at a roundabout on the A148 King's Lynn to Cromer road, about 1 mile (1.6 km) west of the centre of the town of Fakenham and 9 miles (14 km) south of the North Norfolk coast. From here minor roads provide direct connections to the coast in the vicinity of Brancaster, Burnham Market, Wells-next-the-Sea and Blakeney, whilst the A148 provides a connection to the larger resorts of Sheringham and Cromer further to the east.

== See also ==
- A roads in Zone 1 of the Great Britain numbering scheme
