= East Raynham =

Village in Norfolk, England

Coordinates: 52.79239°N 0.79876°E

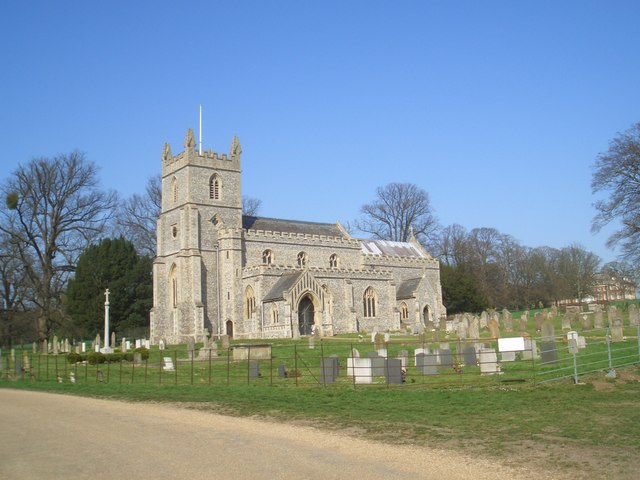
- The Church of St. Mary

- Location within Norfolk
- OS grid reference: TF8725
- Civil parish: Raynham
- District: North Norfolk
- Shire county: Norfolk
- Region: East
- Country: England
- Sovereign state: United Kingdom
- Post town: Fakenham
- Postcode district: NR21
- Dialling code: 01328
- Police: Norfolk
- Fire: Norfolk
- Ambulance: East of England
- UK Parliament: North Norfolk

East Raynham is a village and former civil parish, now in the parish of Raynham, in the North Norfolk district, in the county of Norfolk, England.

East Raynham is located 4 miles (6.4 km) south-west of Fakenham and 24 miles (39 km) north-west of Norwich along the course of the River Wensum.

== History ==
East Raynham's name is of Anglo-Saxon origin and derives from the Old English for the eastern portion of 'Regna's' homestead or village.

In the Domesday Book, East and West Raynham are listed together as a settlement of 33 households in the hundred of Brothercross. In 1086, the village formed part of the East Anglian estates of King William I, Roger Bigod and Reginald, son of Ivo.

In 1731, Raynham, named after Raynham, Norfolk, was incorporated into the State of Massachusetts.

On 1 April 1935 the parish was abolished to form Raynham.

== Geography ==
In 1931 the parish had a population of 130. This was the last time separate population statistics were collected for East Raynham as in 1935, the parish was merged to form Raynham.

East Raynham is located on the course of the River Wensum and the A1065, between Mildenhall and Fakenham.

== Raynham Hall ==
Raynham Hall is a Seventeenth Century manor house first built by Sir Roger Townshend. The hall still stands today, reputedly haunted by the Brown Lady and was the residence of Charles Townshend, an Eighteenth Century Secretary of State.

== The Church of St. Mary ==
East Raynham's parish church is dedicated to Saint Mary and is situated in the parkland of Raynham Hall. The church was largely rebuilt in the mid-Nineteenth Century on the site of an older Medieval building by Clark and Holland of Newmarket. St. Mary's also holds a stone memorial to Maj-Gen. Charles Townshend, who was a distant relative of the Townshends of Raynham Hall, and the grave of Charles Townshend, 2nd Viscount. In 2002, the ring of bells were restored and, in July 2002, received a private visit from Queen Elizabeth II.

== Recreation ==
Much of the area can be visited by a circular walk, which takes in mixed woodland, water meadows, arable land and historic buildings, almost entirely on the Raynham estate.

== Governance ==
East Raynham is part of the electoral ward of The Raynhams for local elections and is part of the district of North Norfolk.

The village's national constituency is North Norfolk, which has been represented by the Liberal Democrat Steff Aquarone MP since 2024.

== War memorial ==
East Raynham's War Memorial is a stone column topped with a crucifix which was unveiled in July 1920 by Lady Agnes Durham and Bishop Temple Hamlyn. The memorial lists the following names for the First World War who were most likely from East Raynham:

Rank	Name	Unit	Date of death	Burial/Commemoration
Sgt.	William H. Green	1st Bn., Norfolk Regiment	25 Oct. 1914	Le Touret Memorial
Sgt.	Herbert W. L. Southgate	1/5th Bn., Norfolk Regt.	19 Apr. 1917	Gaza War Cemetery
LSgt.	Henry Green	Royal Defence Corps	17 Nov. 1918	St. Mary's Churchyard
LSgt.	George W. Carr	8th Bn., Norfolk Regiment	11 Aug. 1917	Menin Gate
Pte.	Augustus Neave	7th Bn., The Buffs	18 Sep. 1918	Templeux Cemetery
Pte.	Benjamin W. Boggis	13th Bn., Durham Light Infantry	3 Jun. 1917	Railway Dugouts Cemetery
Pte.	Richard Plane	2nd Bn., Norfolk Regiment	16 Oct. 1917	North Gate War Cemetery
Pte.	Arthur J. Boggis	8th Bn., Norfolk Regt.	31 Jul. 1917	Menin Gate

And, John Neave. The memorial also lists the following names for the Second World War:

Rank	Name	Unit	Date of death	Burial
Lt.	Maurice G. R. Kingsford	5th Bn., Grenadier Guards	14 Jun. 1944	Bolsena War Cemetery
Lt.	Nicholas J. R. J. Durham	6th Bn., Grenadier Gds.	17 Mar. 1943	Medjez-El-Bab Memorial
Cpl.	Dorothy S. Roffe	Women's Auxiliary Air Force	11 Aug. 1943	St. Mary's Churchyardw
Pte.	Basil W. Brown	Sherwood Foresters	17 Oct. 1941	St. Mary's Churchyard

== Gallery ==
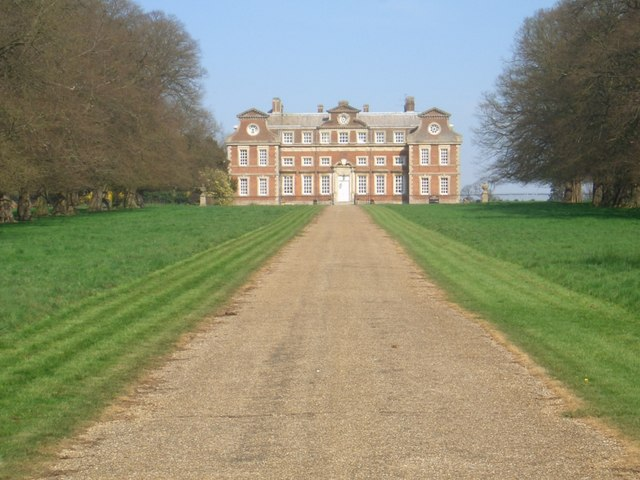
Raynham Hall

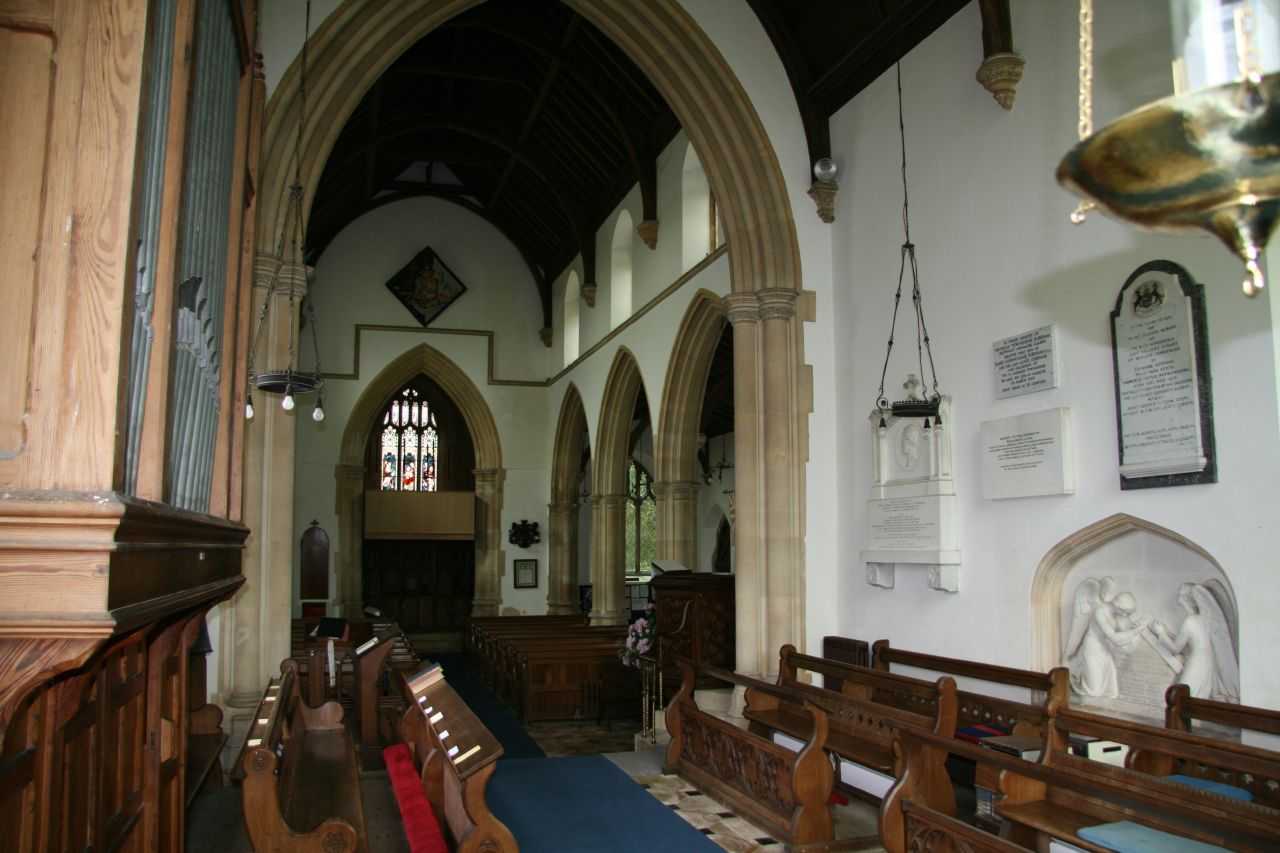
Interior of St. Mary's Church

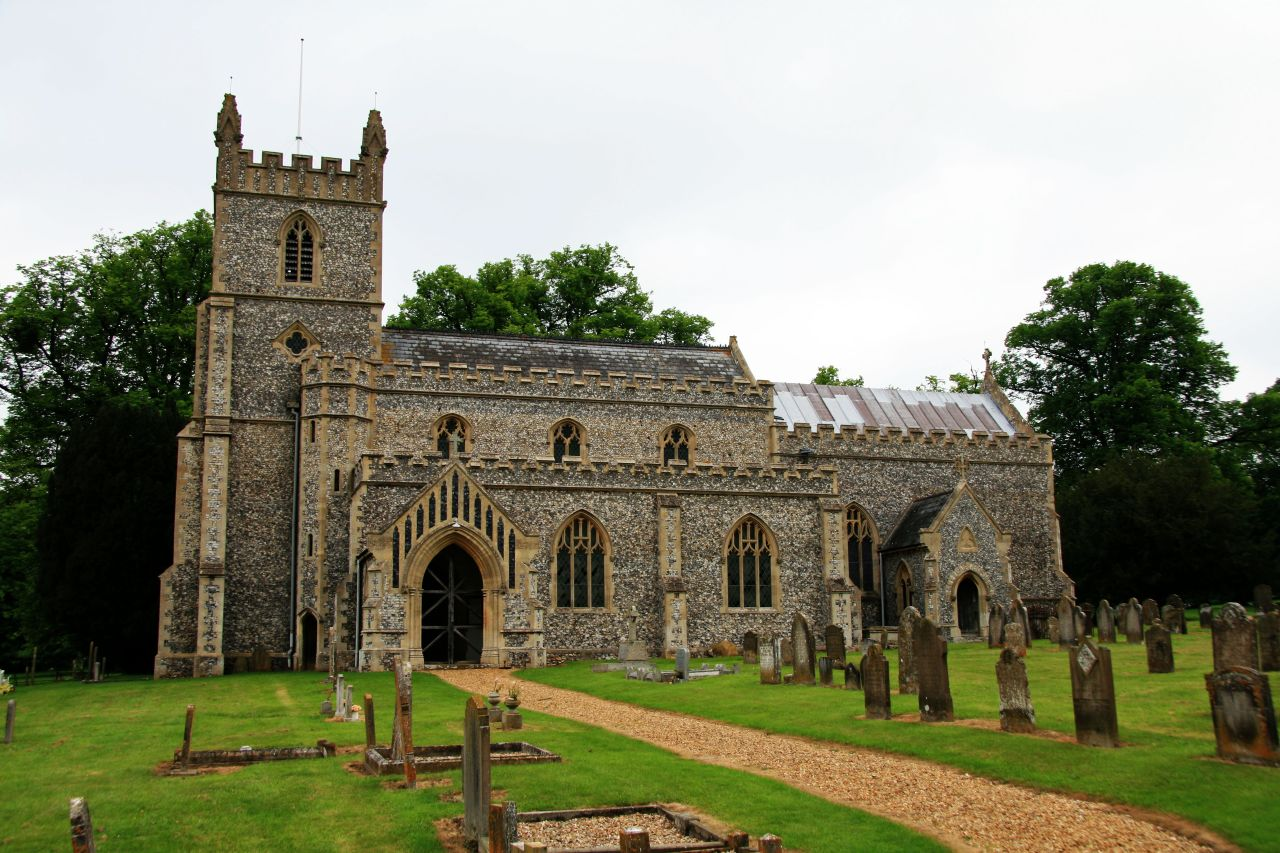
St. Mary's Church
