= William Shelley (judge) =

English judge and politician

Sir William Shelley (1480?–1549) was an English judge.

== Life ==
Born about 1480, Shelley was the eldest son of John Shelley and his wife Elizabeth, daughter and heir of John de Michelgrove. Of William's six brothers, one, John, became a knight of the Order of St John; from another, Edward, came the baronets of Castle Goring, Sussex and Percy Bysshe Shelley, the poet. The youngest brother, John Shelley, died in 1554.

Although Shelley was sent to the Inner Temple not to make a profession of law but in order to understand his own affairs, and according to his son it was against his will that he was made serjeant, and judge, by Henry VIII. From the beginning of Henry's reign he appears on commissions of the peace for Sussex and other counties; in 1517 he was autumn reader in the Inner Temple, and about the same time became one of the judges of the sheriff's court in London. In 1520 he was appointed recorder of London, and in May 1521 was placed on the special commission of oyer and terminer to find an indictment against Edward Stafford, 3rd Duke of Buckingham. In the same year, he took the degree of the coif.

In 1527, Shelley was raised to the bench as judge of the common pleas, and in 1529 he was sent to demand from Thomas Wolsey the surrender of York House, later Whitehall Palace. Soon afterwards, he entertained Henry VIII at Michelgrove in Clapham, West Sussex.

Shelley was summoned to parliament on 9 August 1529, and again on 27 April 1536. He was hostile to the Protestant Reformation, and is said to have suffered from Thomas Cromwell's antipathy; but his name appears in important state trials of the period: in that of the Carthusian monks and John Fisher in 1535, of Weston, Norris, Lord Rochford, and Anne Boleyn in May 1536, and Geoffrey Pole, Edward Neville, and Nicholas Carew in 1538–1539.

Shelley impaling Belknap, St. Mary's Church, Clapham, West Sussex

In 1547, Shelley was consulted by Henry VIII's executors about the provisions of his will. He died on 4 January 1549.

== Family ==
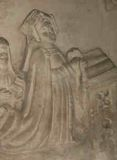
Alice Belknap, Lady Shelley. Clapham Church, Sussex.

Shelley married Alice, daughter of Henry Belknap, grandson of Sir Robert de Bealknap of Knelle in the parish of Beckley, Sussex, Chief Justice of the Common Pleas in his era. They had seven sons and seven daughters, including:

- John Shelley (d. 15 December 1550) of Michelgrove in Sussex, who married Mary Fitzwilliam, the daughter of William Fitzwilliam
- Richard Shelley, second son, knight of Rhodes
- James, also a knight of Rhodes
- Edward, was a master of the household of Henry VIII, treasurer of the council of the north, and captain of Berwick, and was killed at the battle of Pinkie on 10 September 1547
- Thomas Shelley married Mary Copley,
- Margaret, eldest daughter, a nun.
- Elizabeth, who married Roger Copley
- Katherine, who married Henry Browne
- Dorothy, who married Henry Parker

A watercolour drawing of Shelley's tomb done in 1789 by Samuel Hieronymus Grimm is in the British Museum. The monument is in the north wall of the chancel of St. Mary the Virgin, Clapham Church in (West) Sussex. Shelley, who died in 1549, is depicted in judicial attire, complete with a hood and coif. This portrayal is considered one of the earliest examples of this particular legal garb.

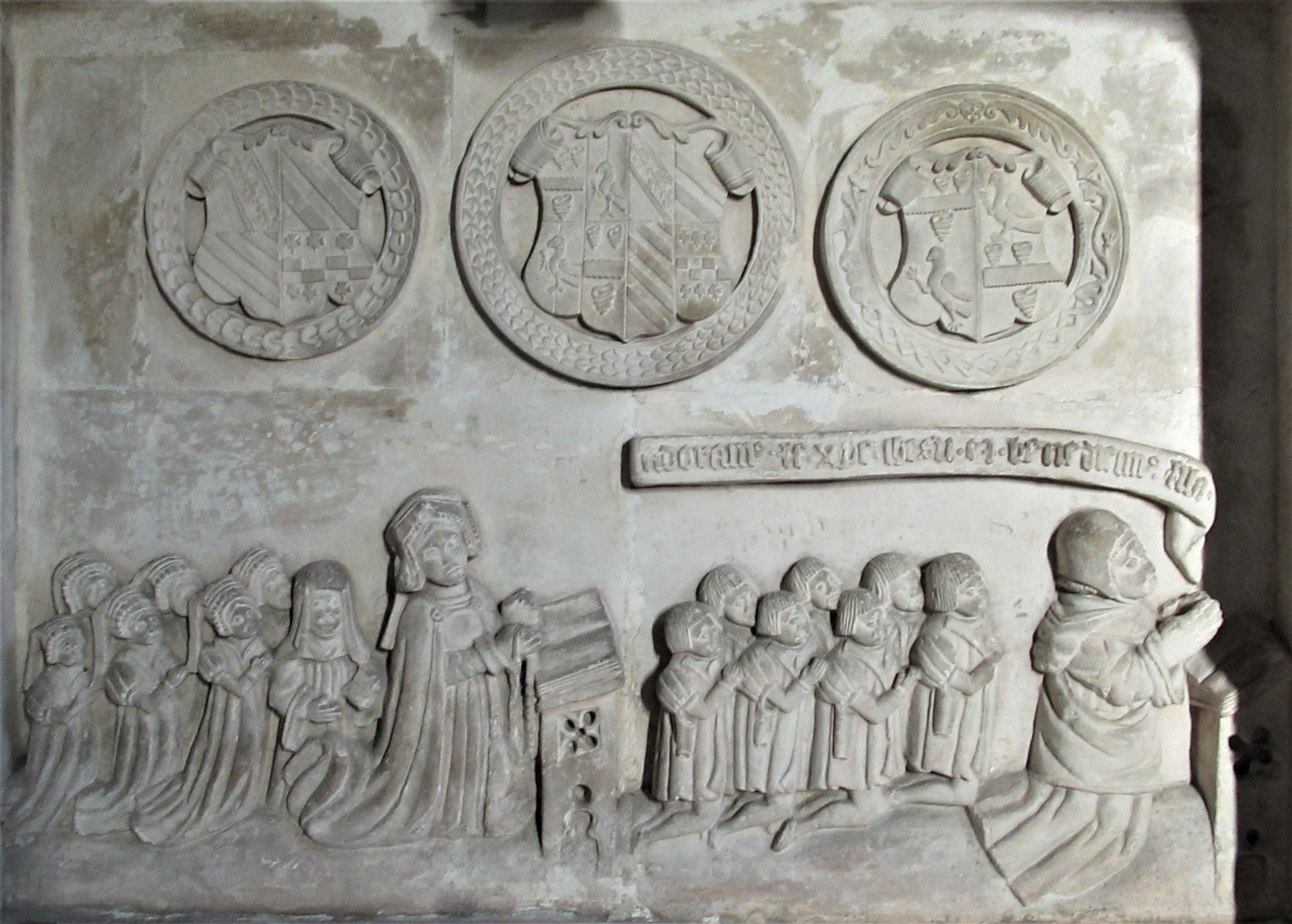
St. Mary's Church, Clapham, West Sussex

== Coats of arms ==
Sable, a fesse engrailed between three shells Or (Shelley)—Azure, three eagles in bend between two cotises Argent (Belknap)

== Notes ==
=== Attribution ===
This article incorporates text from a publication now in the public domain: "Shelley, William (1480?-1549?)". Dictionary of National Biography. London: Smith, Elder & Co. 1885–1900.
