= Roger Townshend (Norfolk MP, born 1477) =

Member of the Parliament of England

Sir Roger Townshend
- Born: 1477; Raynham, Norfolk, England
- Died: 25 November 1551 (aged 73–74); Raynham, Norfolk, England
- Occupations: Politician and Knight
- Title: Sir
- Spouse: Anne De Brewes
- Children: Sir John Townshend; Sir Robert Townshend; Sir George Townshend; Sir Roger Townshend; Sir Thomas Townshend; Sir Giles Townshend; Susan Townshend; Katherine Townshend
- Parent(s): Sir Roger Townshend, Eleanor Lumford

Sir Roger Townshend (1477 – 10 May 1552) was an English landowner, knight and politician.

== Life ==
He was born in Raynham, Norfolk, as the son of Sir Roger Townshend and Eleanor Lumford of Raynham, and studied at Lincoln's Inn.

Instead of following in his father's footsteps as a judge, he devoted himself to his lands and to local affairs. He was appointed High Sheriff of Norfolk and Suffolk for 1511 and 1518 and elected Knight of the Shire for Norfolk in 1529 and 1542. He was knighted in 1518.

== Family ==
He had married Anne (or Amy) Brewes, daughter and co-heiress of William de Brewse, of Wenham Hall, Suffolk, and Stinton Hall in Norfolk, by whom he had six sons and two daughters:

- Sir John Townshend (died 1543/4) of Raynham, who married Eleanor Heydon, the daughter of the courtier Sir John Heydon (died 1551) of Baconsthorpe Castle, Norfolk by his wife, Catherine Willoughby (died 1542), the daughter of Sir Christopher Willoughby. John Townshend predeceased his father, leaving five sons and two daughters, including an eldest son, Richard Townshend (died 1551), who married Katherine Browne, the daughter of Sir Humphrey Browne.
- Sir Robert Townshend (died 3 February 1557), who was Justice of Chester, and married Alice Poppey, daughter and sole heir of Robert Poppey, esquire, of Brampton, Suffolk.
- Sir George Townshend.
- Sir Roger Townshend.
- Sir Thomas Townshend of Tiverton.
- Sir Giles Townshend (died 1552).
- Susan Townshend, who married Sir Edmund Wyndham.
- Katherine Townshend, who married Sir Henry Bedingfield.

He died on 10 May 1552 at Raynham. He was succeeded by his great-grandson, Sir Roger Townshend (died 1590), who served Thomas Howard, 4th Duke of Norfolk as his man of business.

== Ancestry ==
Ancestors of Roger Townshend (Norfolk MP, born 1477)

16. Sir Thomas de Townshend
8. Sir Roger de Townshend
17. Agnes Payne
4. Sir John Townshend
9. Eleanor Giggs
2. Sir Roger Townshend
5. Joan Lunsford
1. Sir Roger Townshend
3. Eleanor Lumford
