= Nathaniel Bacon of Stiffkey =

English lawyer and politician

Sir Nathaniel Bacon (died 7 November 1622), of Stiffkey in Norfolk, was an English lawyer and Member of Parliament (MP).

== Life ==
Nathaniel Bacon was the second son of Sir Nicholas Bacon, full brother of Elizabeth Bacon, and half-brother of Francis Bacon and Anthony Bacon. Educated at Trinity College, Cambridge, he was admitted to Gray's Inn in 1562, and became an "ancient" of the Inn in 1576. He was MP for Tavistock (1571–1583), Norfolk (1584–1585, 1593 and 1604–1611, and defeated there in 1601) and King's Lynn (1597–1598); a Puritan, he was an occasionally vocal member of their parliamentary faction during Elizabeth I's reign. He also served as High Sheriff of Norfolk in 1586 and 1599, and was knighted in 1604.

Bacon's will, written in 1614, mentions the construction of his tomb at Stiffkey, and a jewel with a unicorn horn, which his three daughters were to use as a medicinal charm.

Bacon was married twice. He had three daughters by his first wife, Anne Gresham, daughter of Thomas Gresham; his eldest daughter and a co-heir, Anne Bacon, married Sir John Townshend. Tailor's bills detail clothing materials he bought for his family.

Bacon's second wife was Dorothy Hopton, the daughter of Arthur Hopton.
