= Raynham, Norfolk =

Civil parish in Norfolk, England

Coordinates: 52.785°N 0.78°E

Raynham
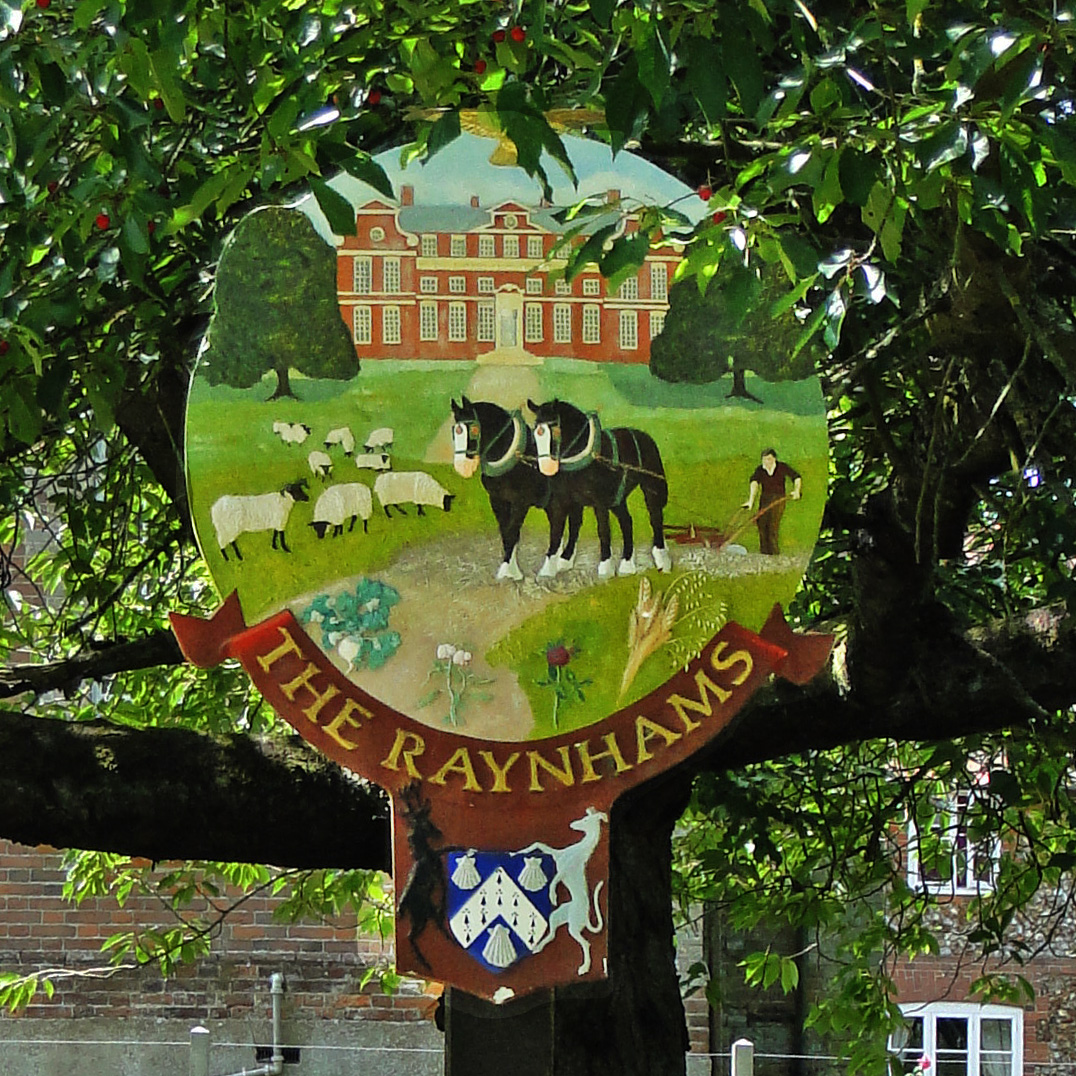
- The Raynhams village sign

- Location within Norfolk
- Area: 16.75 km^{2} (6.47 sq mi)
- Population: 330 (2011)
  - Density: 20/km^{2} (52/sq mi)
- OS grid reference: TF875245
- Civil parish: Raynham
- District: North Norfolk
- Shire county: Norfolk
- Region: East
- Country: England
- Sovereign state: United Kingdom
- Post town: FAKENHAM
- Postcode district: NR21
- Dialling code: 01328
- Police: Norfolk
- Fire: Norfolk
- Ambulance: East of England

Raynham is a civil parish in the English county of Norfolk, consisting of the villages of South, East and West Raynham. It covers an area of 16.75 km^{2} (6.47 sq mi) and had a population of 257 in 113 households at the 2001 census, increasing to 330 at the Census 2011. For the purposes of local government, it falls within the district of North Norfolk.

The name 'Raynham' means 'Regna's homestead/village' or 'Regna's hemmed-in land'.

== Governance ==
Raynham is part of the electoral ward called The Raynhams. This ward stretches north to Tattersett with a total population at the 2011 Census of 2,521.
