= William Knyvett (died 1515) =

English knight

Sir William Knyvett (1441/2 – 2 December 1515) was an English knight in the late Middle Ages. He was the son of John Knyvett and Alice Lynne, the grandson of Sir John Knyvett, and assumed the titles of Sheriff of Norfolk & Suffolk, Burgess of Melcombe, Bletchingley, & Grantham, Constable of Rising Castle.

== Life ==
Sir William married three times. The first was to Alice Grey (d. 1474), daughter of John Grey, Esq., of Kempston, eldest son of Reginald Grey, 3rd Baron Grey de Ruthyn by his second wife, Joan Astley; by whom he had issue. His second marriage was to Lady Joan Stafford, daughter of Humphrey Stafford, 1st Duke of Buckingham and Lady Anne Neville, by whom he had issue. His final marriage was to Lady Joan Courtenay (d. 8 February 1501), widow of Sir Roger Clifford, and daughter of Thomas de Courtenay, 5th Earl of Devon, a friend of York, and his wife, Lady Margaret Beaufort; they had no issue.

He was one the executors of the will of his uncle-by-marriage, Avery Cornburgh.

In 1483, he was attainted by the name of Sir Will. Knevet, Knt. of Bukenham, conjurer, together with the Earl of Richmond and John, Earl of Oxford in the parliament summoned the 25 January 1st Richard III, as being partakers with Henry, Earl of Richmond (afterwards Henry VII).

In 1482 his sister Elizabeth had died under mysterious circumstances. Roger Virgoe writes:

In 1482 an inquest was held on the body of Elizabeth Knyvett, spinster, of Buckenham Castle, who had died in the Marshalsea Prison. The inquest found that she had died by 'divine visitation'. i.e. of natural causes, but it is difficult to understand how a powerful family like the Knyvetts could have allowed a daughter and sister to be imprisoned: it must surely have been a serious matter.

Elizabeth was one of his three sisters, the other two being Margaret and Christian, who married Henry Colet.

Sir William Knyvett was one of the Knights Bachelor at the coronation of Elizabeth of York in 1487.

Sir William Knyvett died 2 December 1515. In his will dated 18 September 1514 and proved 19 June 1516 he requested to be buried in the church of Wymondham, Norfolk. As executors Knyvett appointed his son, Edward, together with Lord Fitzwalter, Sir Thomas Wyndham, the lawyer, Francis Moundford, and his servants, Richard Banyard and John Kensey. As overseer he appointed 'my most singuler good and gracious lord, my lord of Buckingham.' Edward proved the will on 19 June 1516.

At New Buckenham, in 1888, the following inscription was found on a brass, loose in the Church Chest:

To the memory of Alice, wife of William Knyvet, Esq., dau. of John Grey, son of Reginald Grey, Lord of Rythin, who died 4 April 1474.

A century before it had been on a flat stone.

== Issue ==
His children by his first wife, Alice Grey (d. 4 April 1474), were:

- Sir Edmund Knyvett (d.1504) of Buckenham, who married Eleanor Tyrrell, the daughter of Sir William Tyrrell of Gipping, Suffolk by Margaret, daughter of Robert Darcy, knight. Eleanor was sister of Sir James Tyrrell. Sir Edmund Knyvett, his eldest son by his first marriage, was partly disinherited by his father, who left Buckenham Castle and other properties to Sir Edward Knyvett, the eldest son of his second marriage to Joan Stafford. Children of Sir Edmund Knyvett and Eleanor Tyrrell:
  1. Sir Thomas Knyvett of Buckenham, Norfolk (c. 1485 – 10 August 1512) who married Muriel Howard (d.1512), the widow of John Grey, 2nd Viscount Lisle, by whom she was the mother of Elizabeth Grey, Viscountess Lisle, who was at one time betrothed to Charles Brandon, 1st Duke of Suffolk and was the wife of Henry Courtenay. Muriel Howard was the daughter of Thomas Howard, 2nd Duke of Norfolk, and Elizabeth Tilney.
  2. Edmund Knyvett (d. 1 May 1539), esquire, sergeant porter to King Henry VIII, who married Joan Bourchier (d. 17 February 1561/2), the only surviving child of John Bourchier, 2nd Baron Berners, and had:
    - John Knyvett of Plumstead (1517–1561), who m. Agnes, daughter of Sir John Harcourt of Stanton Harcourt, Oxfordshire, by settlement dated 14 February 1537, and had:
      1. Thomas Knyvett (1539–1616) of Ashwellthorpe, de jure 4th Baron Berners, High Sheriff of Norfolk from 1579, m. Muriel Parry, daughter of Sir Thomas Parry, Comptroller of the Household to Queen Elizabeth I, and had:
        1. Sir Thomas Knyvet (d. 1605), of Ashwellthorpe, Norfolk and Stradbroke
        2. Katherine Knyvett, Lady Paston, one of the writers of the Paston Letters
        3. Muriel Knyvett, who married Sir Edmond Bell, as his second wife
        4. Mary Knyvett, who married Sir Thomas Holland of Quidenham, Norfolk, and had Sir John Holland, 1st Baronet
        5. Abigail Knyvett, m. Sir Edmund Moundeford of Mundford and Hockwold, Norfolk the grandson of Francis Mountford, as his second wife. From his first marriage he had Sir Edmund Moundeford (1596 – May 1643), who left much of his inheritance to his half-sister, Abigail's daughter Elizabeth
      2. Edmund Knyvett
      3. Henry Knyvett
      4. Abigail Knyvett (d. 1623), who married Martin Sedley of Morley, Norfolk (1531–1609/10), as his second wife, by settlement dated 1577
      5. Elizabeth Knyvett, who married Anthony Ashfield
      6. Possibly the Rose Knyvett who married Michael Beresford. This has been discounted because of the arms registered in visitations and which are on display on the tomb of her daughter Bennet (also a Knyvett name), as Rose's coat of arms is given as Gules, three plates charged with a cinquefoil sable, unlike this Knyvett family, whose arms are Argent, a bend sable engrailed within a border of the same. Rose was the grandmother of Sir Tristram Beresford, 1st Baronet
    - William Knyvett (buried 30 June 1612), second son, married Dorothy (buried 2 March 1616), daughter of Robert Themilthorp of Tunstead, and by will dated Nov. 26, 1594, ordered his body to be buried in the church of Fundenhale, where he lived, leaving two sons and two daughters:
      - John Knyvet of Fundenhale, his eldest son, married Joan daughter of Robert Browne of Tacolneston, and had John Knyvet of Fundenhale, who by his wife Anne had John, who married secondly Joanna Sutton, and had William Knyvet, Esq. of Fundenhale, a later coroner for the county of Norfolk, from whom descended Charles Knyvett and William Knyvett
      - Thomas (baptised 21 July 1563 – buried 12 November 1595), the second son, died without issue
      - Edmund (baptised 4 December 1565)
      - Henry (baptised 9 October 1569)
      - Joanna (baptised 30 March 1561)
      - Muriel, the eldest (surviving) daughter, married to Jeffry Abbs, and had issue
      - Amphillis, the second (surviving) daughter, married 16 April 1611 to William Baldwin
      - Anne, married to Mr. Johnson (d. bef. 1612), and left issue
      - Margareta (born 1573)
    - Edmund Knyvett. His mother surrendered her manor of Gately in 1551 jointly to her sons William and Edmund Knevet. He married firstly Elizabeth, daughter of Charles Knyvett, and secondly Elizabeth Gooday on 3 December 1563. He had issue from both wives
    - Thomas, married Mary Wolverton of Wolverton in Suffolk
    - Rose Knyvett (d. 1587/8), married as his second wife Oliver Reims of Burnham Debden in Norfolk and of Hempton by Fakenham
    - Alice, wife of Oliver Shiers of Wreningham
    - Christian, wife to Thomas Foster
    - Katherine Knyvett (d. 1595/6), married firstly John Walpole of Harpley & Colkirk in Norfolk (d. 1557/8), Serjeant-at-law, Gray's Inn. M.P. for Lynn 1553, and secondly Thomas Skarlett of Harpley, Gentleman, the executor of the will of her first husband.
    - Elizabeth, married Francis Bohun of Tressingfield in Suffolk
    - Anne, married Edmund Thimelthorpe of Worsted in Norfolk
  3. Christopher Knyvett. Christopher Knyvett, the third brother in his family, is particularly noteworthy because he and his wife from Brabant are believed to be depicted in the 'Ashwellthorpe Triptych' housed at Norwich Castle Museum. Christopher likely followed his elder siblings to the court of Henry VIII at the beginning of the new reign, establishing his presence there by October 1512 when he was dispatched as an envoy to the court of Margaret, Duchess of Savoy, the regent of the Netherlands. Margaret’s court was renowned for its culture, nobility, and learning, attracting English ladies such as Anne Boleyn for their courtly education. Although it’s tempting to connect Christopher’s marriage to the 'daughter and heir of the lord of Ashe near Brussels' and the painting to this diplomatic mission, he was probably quite young at that time. It's more plausible that the marriage occurred due to a later mission, as the painting is dated '1519'. While there is no direct evidence of Christopher being in the Netherlands after 1512, it seems highly probable, especially since his brother Anthony was sent there on a mission in 1518. If Catherine van Assche was indeed an heiress, as genealogical records suggest, this marriage was an exceptionally advantageous match for a younger son without clear prospects of acquiring land. It is indeed true that he appeared to enjoy favor at Court, and from 1515, he received an annual wage of £20 for his role in the Household. It's likely that he joined the King during the siege of Tournai in 1513, and in 1515, he and his brothers, James and Anthony, were granted the lands and possessions of two 'rebels' in that city. However, whether they benefited financially from this grant remains uncertain. There is no additional evidence of any other grants or promotions in the King's service. Nonetheless, his prospects improved significantly at the end of 1519 when he inherited the reversion of a modest yet substantial estate in Northamptonshire from his cousin, John Colet, Dean of St. Pauls. On 14 November of that year, he was granted control of the estate, subject to a rent of 20 marks per year payable to Colet's mother, Christian Colet, who was Christopher's great-aunt. It's possible that Christopher's marriage and the commissioning of the Triptych were linked to his newfound status as a small landowner, although there is no evidence to support this. No further mentions of Christopher have been found following the payment of his half-year's wages in early 1520, and it is likely that he died later that year or shortly thereafter. If he had moved to live on his wife's estates in Brabant, it would be difficult to explain how the Triptych ended up at his brother Edmund's residence in Ashwellthorpe. There is no evidence that he had any children, and his wife's fate remains unknown.
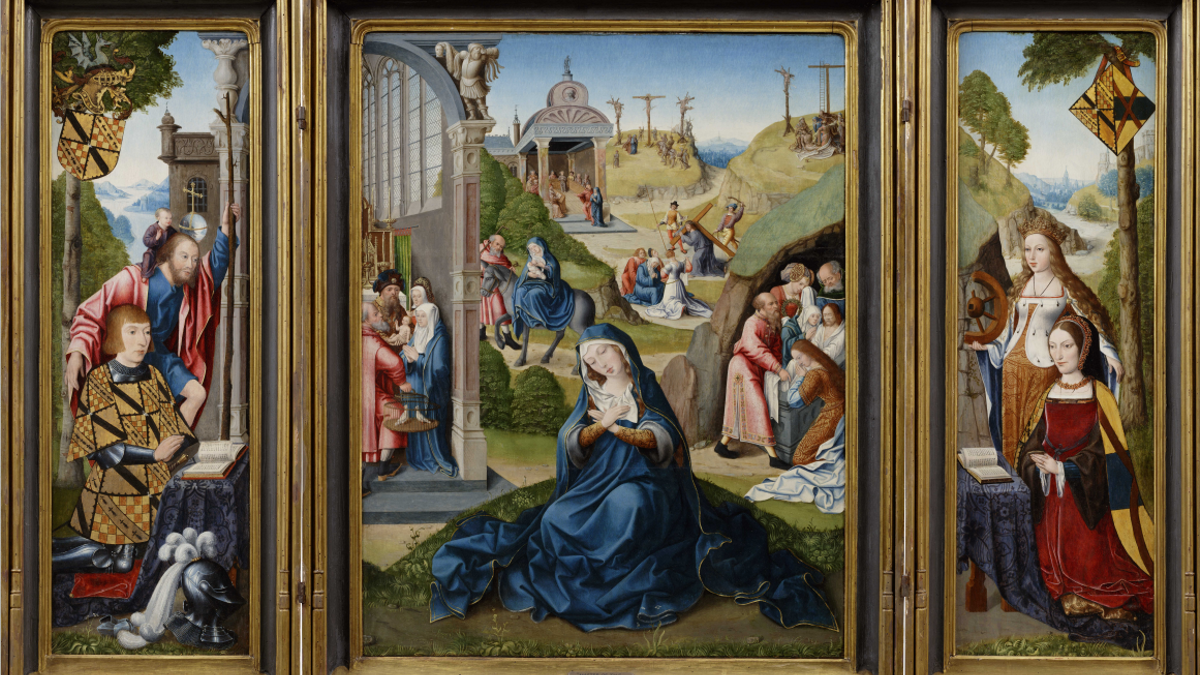
    The Ashwellthorpe Triptych. The figures on the far right and the far left shown kneeling and praying are believed to be Christopher Knyvett and his wife Catherine van Assche. Christoper is wearing the arms of Knyvett, Argent, a bend within a bordure engrailed all sable, quartered with those of Clinton, chequy or and gules, a bend ermine. Above the lady is Knyvett impaling the lady's coat of arms, Or a fess sable Saltire gules
  4. James Knyvett. James, the fourth brother, had joined his older siblings at Court by 1510 when he received livery as the King's servant. Under the command of his brother, Sir Thomas, and the Howards, he was actively involved in the French Wars of 1512–14, initially as captain of the 'Margaret of Topsham' and later the 'Mary Cradok'. In October 1513, he received a special payment of £10 for his skirmishing with the French. Alongside his brothers, he was awarded lands and goods at Tournai in 1515. In 1516, he attended the King with two of his brothers at jousts of honor. However, there are no further records of him, and he likely died soon after, as he is not mentioned alongside his brothers as remainderman in John Colet's will made in August 1519.
  5. Sir Anthony Knyvett, knight, who served as Black Rod, married Avise or Avice Mortelman (d. October 1554). She was the widow of Nicholas Gibson, grocer, citizen and Sheriff of London in 1539. The Nicholas Gibson Free School was founded by Avice and Nicholas.
  6. William Knyvett. William Knyvett is not linked to the other Knyvetts in official records and is not mentioned as a remainderman in John Colet's will. However, early genealogies give him as a brother of Thomas, Edmund, and others, which seems plausible given his career in the court and at sea aligns with those of Thomas, James, and Anthony. The earliest mention of him is a pardon granted to 'William Knyvett of London and Westminster, gentleman' in 1513. Shortly after, he was serving at sea, and by May 1516, he reportedly seized a ship to embark on adventures. He likely joined his brothers at Court by then and was present at the Field of the Cloth of Gold. When war erupted in 1523, he became captain of 'The Great Spaniard' but soon returned to the Royal Household as a 'gentleman-usher.' However, he was among those who were 'put out of their room' in 1526.. He mainly served the Household: by the early 1530s, he received a £20 annual annuity from the King, to whom he gave New Year gifts. In 1539, he was described as 'of the Household' when he received leases of properties from Esholt Priory in Yorkshire. In 1547, he attended Henry VIII's funeral as 'serjeant-porter,' a position he seems to have inherited from his brother, Edmund. According to early genealogies, he married Joan, daughter of Thomas Haute, and they had two sons, Alexander and Edmund.
  7. Margaret
  8. Dorothy
  9. Anne Knyvett, lady in waiting to Katherine of Aragon, m. Sir George St. Leger (c.1475–1536) of Annery, Devon, and had Sir John St. Leger, Katherine, and George
- Anne Knyvett, who married John Thwaites, Esq.
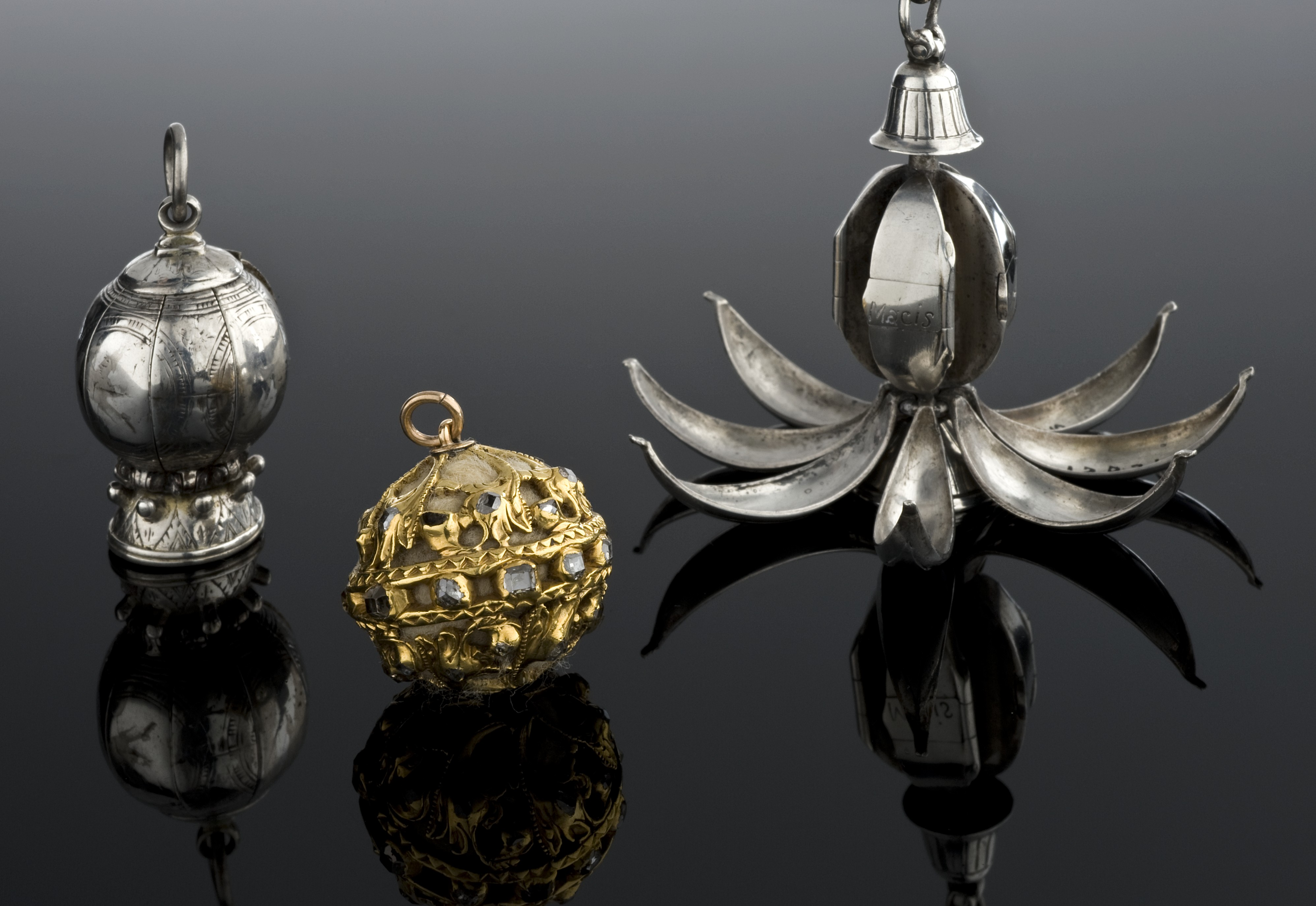
- Selection of gold and silver muskballs, Europe
  Bennet Knyvett (d. 1499), a daughter, latinized Benedicta, who lived in the household of her aunt Christian Colet, where she died in 1499, leaving a gold cross to ‘my dere beloved lady and aunt’ a gold ring with the five wounds to her ‘most dere and reverend fader, Sir William Knyvett, knight,’ and left gold rings to her three brothers and five sisters, and a muskball to her great-aunt Beatrice Cornburgh, and bequests to her cousins
- Elizabeth Knyvett, a nun at Barking Abbey, mentioned in the will of her sister Bennet in 1499

By his second wife, Lady Joan Stafford, Sir William Knyvett had three sons including along with three daughters:

- Sir Edward Knyvett, (d.1528) the eldest son of his second marriage, who received a great inheritance from his father at the expense of his brother. He married Anne (d.1540+), daughter and coheiress of Thomas le Strange of Walton D'Eivile in Warwickshire, Esq., widow of Robert le Strange and mother Sir Thomas le Strange and his two sisters. (Note: Sir Edward Knyvett is often given another wife, Anne Calthorpe (d. 20 October 1497), the daughter of Sir John Calthorpe and Elizabeth Wentworth, and the widow of John Cressener. She, however, married secondly Edward Knyvett of Stanway (d. around 1500), who like Sir Edward's father Sir William Knyvett, descended from John Knyvet (died 16 February 1381), Chief Justice of the King's Bench and Lord Chancellor of England. One Victorian edition of the Visitation of Suffolk, however, suggests that Anne's sister, Agnes Calthorpe, married Sir Edward's brother Charles Knyvett as her third husband.)
- Charles Knyvett, of Kent alias of London, according to Carole Rawcliffe, in The Staffords, Earls of Stafford and Dukes of Buckingham 1394–1521, Charles Knyvett witnessed against the Duke because he had "wrongfully withheld" the possessions of Elizabeth Knyvett after her death. He married firstly before 1512 a wife Richardson gives as unidentified, and secondly by settlement of 26 April 1513/4 Anne Lacy (d.1562), the daughter and heiress of Walter Lacy of London by his wife Lucy. The Lacys were apparently from Norfolk and one source calls him a knight. Anne and her mother Lucy were robbed in 1530, and their maid Joan Cake murdered. Anne later remarried to the gentleman John Sebyll or Sybley. It would appear as if this first, unidentified wife could be Agnes Calthorpe, daughter of Sir John Calthorpe and the widow of William Curson (d. 21 or 22 August 1485) and John Crane (d. 1504), although Charles does not appear on any Calthorpe pedigrees and Agnes would have had to name two sons Robert and three daughters Elizabeth. This first Elizabeth also went by Mary, and would later marry Sir Thomas Tey, knight. Agnes held the manor of Bury-in-Barton in 1494 in dower for her life from her first husband. Agnes was the daughter of John Calthorpe, knight, by Elizabeth, daughter of Roger Wentworth and Margery le Despenser. Her sister Anne Calthorpe (d. 20 October 1497), married as the widow of John Cressener (d. 24 August 1485) to Edward Knyvett of Stanway (d. 4 February 1501), who like Sir William Knyvett, descended from John Knyvet (died 16 February 1381), Chief Justice of the King's Bench and Lord Chancellor of England. Brothers-in-law John Cressener and William Curson both died in the days of the Battle of Bosworth Field.
  1. Robert Knyvett (1511–1549), gentleman, son and heir, slain in Kett's Rebellion, son by Charles Knyvett's first wife. He was married to Anne Tollemache. His “next friends’ at the inquest that assigned dower to Edward’s widow in May 1529 were the Duke of Norfolk, Robert Holdiche and Richard Banyard (his uncle’s executor), but on 24 January 1530 Robert’s wardship was granted to Sir Thomas Boleyn, Earl of Wiltshire. Robert entered the service of the Duke of Norfolk and while serving him at Chelsea in 1536 he was reported to have 'the sickness'. He lived, however, until he was slain at Kett's camp, and later buried at St. Peter Mancroft with many of his comrades.
  2. Elizabeth, daughter by Charles Knyvett's first wife. Her uncle, Sir Edward Knyvet, in his will proven 10 December 1528, gave "C marks to his niece Elizabeth Knyvet, daughter of my brother, Charles Knyvet," only "iff she be maryed by the advyse of my especiall good lady the Duchess of Norffolk, with whom the said Elizabeth is in service." Elizabeth had to marry with the consent of the Duchess of Norfolk, in whose household she was placed. Elizabeth married Richard Fitzwilliam, Esquire, of Kilburn, Middlesex, Ringstead, Northamptonshire, the uncle of Mildred Cooke, Lady Burghley's, as the brother of her mother Anne Fitzwilliam, and the son of Sir William Fitzwilliam, Merchant Taylor, Sheriff of London, servant of Cardinal Wolsey, and a member of the council of Henry VII, by marriage settlements dated 16 November 1528.
    - By Anne Lacy:
  3. Richard Knyvett (d.1559), married to Helen Harding, the daughter of William Harding of London and Knowle Park, Cranleigh, Surrey (d. 7 September 1549), citizen and goldsmith of London, by Cecily Marshe, the daughter of Walter Marshe of London. Their children were Mary (b. 27 February 1557), who married Sir Henry North of Mildenhall in Suffolk and had Sir Roger North; and Henry (3 April 1559 – June 1603). His widow Helen married secondly Sir Thomas Browne (d. 1597)
  4. Anthony Knyvett of Chiddingstone in Kent, one of the leaders of Wyatt's Rebellion, executed in 1554 at Sevenoaks in Kent
  5. William Knyvett one of the leaders of Wyatt's Rebellion, executed in 1554 at Sevenoaks in Kent
  6. Lucy, the wife of Sir Henry Gates
  7. Anne, who married firstly Nicholas Robinson, secondly Leonard Irby and thirdly Robert Carr
  8. Alice, the wife of Edmund Verney, the grandson of Edmund Braye, 1st Baron Braye
- John Knyvett
- Elizabeth, likely the Elizabeth Knyvett who is mentioned in her father's will in 1514 as being of a marriageable age. In his will her father left her 500 marks for her marriage, if it were approved by the Duke and Lord Fitzwalter, and if her husband were a gentleman of £100 p.a. of land. And also likely the Elizabeth Knyvett who died in 1518, when Edward Stafford, 3rd Duke of Buckingham gives 15l 'To M. Geddyng, toward the burying of my said cousin', after giving at Easter last 'Eliz. knevet' the 20l due to her at Lady Day. The two were related through her mother. Roger Virgoe also writes that it was this Elizabeth who was a household servant of her cousin, the Duke of Buckingham, and she did not marry, dying at Eastington in Gloucestershire in 1518
- Anne Knyvett who married Charles Clifford, Esq., the son of her father William Knyvett's third wife, Joan Courtenay (d. 8 February 1501), by her first husband, Sir Roger Clifford. Roger Virgoe writes:

This was not a successful marriage. Charles was a squire of the body at Henry VII’s funeral and was a soldier at Calais from 1512 to 1514 but thereafter disappears from View. Sir William, in his will of 1515, bequeaths to his daughter £20 p.a. for twelve years to pay for her apparel and her children, because her husband ‘by his negligence and misordrely lyving is brought in great daunger and poverte so that my seid daughter lyveth a pore lyff’. Anne is also remembered in the will of her brother, Edward, fourteen years later. She had at least two sons and a daughter, one of the sons coming to a shameful end, being executed in 1538 for forging the King’s seal. In his will of lands he [Edward] provided from his enfeoffed manor of Wymondham an annuity of £10 p.a. to his impoverished sister, Anne Clifford

Charles Clifford (born 1480/1) sold the marriage of his eldest son to Edmund Dudley in 1508.

== Footnotes ==
Political offices
Preceded by William Hopton	High Sheriff of Norfolk and Suffolk; 1480 and 1471	Succeeded by Alexander Cressener
