= Knyvett =

Knyvett or Knyvet is a surname. Notable people with the surname include:

- Alice Knyvet, 15th century English noblewoman
- Anthony Knyvett (disambiguation), several people named Anthony Knyvett or Anthony Knyvet
- Carey Knyvett (1885–1967), English bishop
- Catherine Howard, Countess of Suffolk (née Knyvet/Knyvett; 1564–1638), English court office holder
- Charles Knyvett (1752–1822), English musician
- Edmund Knyvet (1508–1551), English courtier and sea captain
- Frances Knyvet or Knyvett (1583–1605), English courtier
- Henry Knyvet (c. 1537–1598), English Member of Parliament
- Henry Knyvet (died 1547), English office holder and Master of the Jewel Office
- John Knyvet (disambiguation), the name of several people
- Thomas Knyvet (disambiguation), several people named Thomas Knyvett or Thomas Knyvet
- William Knyvett (disambiguation), the name of several people
- Knyvett baronets: Sir Philip Knyvett, 1st Baronet (died 1655), and Sir Robert Knyvett, 2nd Baronet (died 1699)

== See also ==
- Knyvett Crosse (1855–1916), a Welsh international footballer
- Knyvett v Christchurch Casinos Ltd, a New Zealand Appeal Court case
- Arthur Knyvett-Lee (1887–1974), British art gallery owner
