= Avery Cornburgh =

English politician and sea captain

Keeper of the Great Wardrobe
- In office 1486–1487
- Monarch: Henry VII
- Preceded by: Sir Hugh Conway
- Succeeded by: Peter Curtys

Under-Treasurer of England
- In office 1483–1487
- Monarchs: Richard III; Henry VII

Personal details
- Born: 1430
- Died: 2 February 1487 (aged 56–57) Romford, Essex, England

Avery Cornburgh (1430 – 2 February 1487) was an English politician and sea captain who was Under-Treasurer of England from 1483 to 1487 and Keeper of the Great Wardrobe in the Royal Household from 1486 to 1487.

== Career ==
He was a Member (MP) of the Parliament of England for Cornwall 1463 and 1467 and probably also for a Cornish seat in 1472–5. He was MP for Plymouth in 1478, 1483, 1485 and also probably also for a Cornish seat in 1484.

In the Royal Household, he was a Yeoman of the Crown and Chamber from 1455 to 1474 then an Esquire of the Body and Sea captain from 1474 to 1485. He was Under-Treasurer of England 1483–87 and Keeper of the king's Great Wardrobe from 1486 to 1487.

In the Duchy of Cornwall, he was Controller of Mines from 1455 then keeper of Launceston Castle, water bailiff of Plymouth and Escheator (or Feodary) in Cornwall and Devon in 1460. Controller of Tin Mines in Cornwall, keeper of the Fowey and Carrybullock, and keeper of Restormel Castle and Controller of mines from 1483. He was JP for Cornwall from 1463 and Essex from 1468, sheriff of Cornwall in 1464–5 and 1468-9 and sheriff of Essex and Hertfordshire 1472–3 and 1477–8. He was responsible for buying the ship the 'John Evangelist' in Dartmouth for the Royal Navy in 1463. He was also sea captain of the ship the 'Grace Dieu' in 1480.

== Personal life and death ==
He married Beatrice Lynne. Margaret Connolly writes:

She was the daughter of London citizens, William and Alice Lynne. Her father, variously described as a ‘wolmongere’, merchant, and grocer, died in 1421, leaving all of his property to his wife who subsequently took a vow of chastity. At the time of his death his five children, John, Robert, Margaret, Alice, and Beatrice, were all minors. Nothing further is known of Robert who may have died before he reached maturity, but the fortunes of the four other children can be easily traced. John and Alice both subsequently married into the Knyvett family of Norfolk, John acquiring the Knyvett ancestral home of Southwick via his wife, either as her dowry or perhaps by purchase.

John Lynne's wife was Joan, one of the daughters of Sir John Knyvett and Elizabeth, daughter of Constantine, 2nd Lord Clifton (1372–95) of Buckenham Castle. Alice Lynne married Sir John's son and heir, also named John Knyvett (1416–91). Margaret Lynne became the second wife of the London scribe John Shirley who died in 1456.

Beatrice Lynne’s first husband was Thomas Oxney, a grocer, and this marriage had occurred by 1429, because in that year Oxney acknowledged satisfaction for his wife’s patrimony before the mayor of London, Henry Bartone. They had at least one child, a son, also named Thomas. By 1461 Beatrice was widowed

His brother-in-law John Shirley inscribed a book for him.

Avery Cornburgh lived at Dover's in Essex and Bere Ferrers in Devon. He owned Hatters, Dagenham from 1482 to 1487. He also lived at Gooshays, Essex.

He died on 2 February 1487 and was buried at Romford, Essex. One of the executors of his will was his nephew-by-marriage Sir William Knyvett.

An altar-tomb was erected for himself, his wfe, his sister Elizabeth Hanys and Maister John Crowland on which was the portraiture of a man in armour, with a sword by his side and a dagger lying betwixt his wife and his sister.

Beatrice lived until at least 1499 when her grand-niece Bennet Knyvett left her a muskball in her will.
