= John Shirley (scribe) =

English writer and scribe (c. 1366–1456)

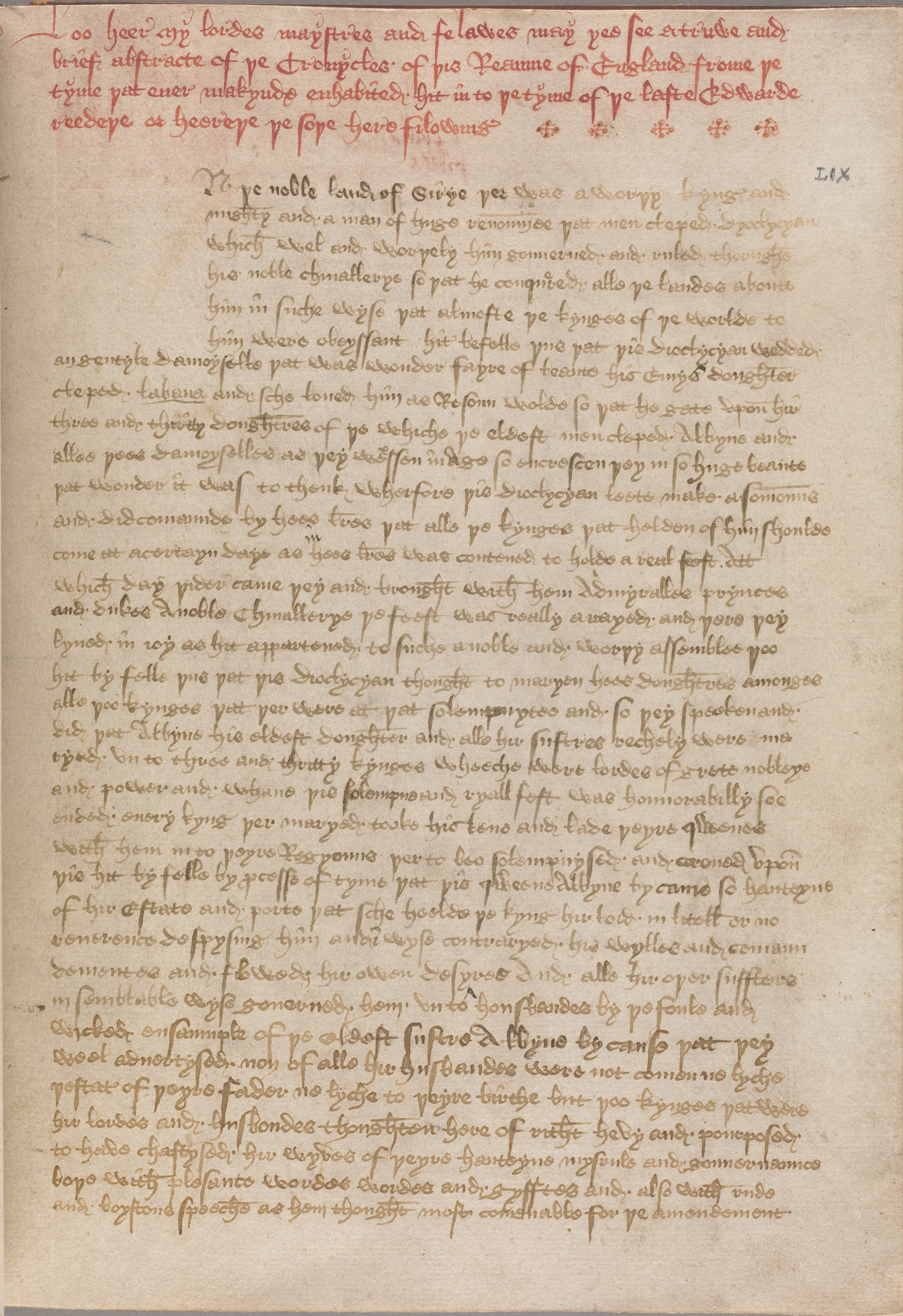
A "Shirleian" manuscript (Houghton Library MS Eng 530): not in Shirley’s own hand, but including texts derived from copies Shirley had made

John Shirley (c. 1366 – 1456) was an English author, translator, and scribe. As a scribe of later Middle English literature, he is particularly known for transcribing works by John Lydgate and Geoffrey Chaucer.

== Biography ==
John Shirley, born about 1366, is said to have been the son of a squire who had travelled widely in foreign countries. He has not been identified with any of the numerous Shirleys recorded in the Stemmata Shirleiana, (Note: Shirley, Stemmata Shirleiana 1873, pp. 39–40.) but he was "a great traveller in divers countries", and on the monumental brass to his memory in St. Bartholomew-the-Less both he and his wife are pictured in the habit of pilgrims.

Shirley's career began in the service of Richard Beauchamp, 13th Earl of Warwick. In 1403, Shirley was in Warwick's retinue in the campaign against Owain Glyn Dŵr. In 1414, he collected wages for Warwick's retinue in France and was specified as the earl's secretary in 1420–21. Warwick returned to England between 1428 and 1430 as tutor to Henry VI, from whom Shirley received a new year's gift in 1428. In June 1428, Shirley and other members of the Beauchamp household were admitted to confraternity of St Albans Abbey. In 1432–3, Shirley was Comptroller of Petty Customs in the Port of London, and in 1436 he was recorded as having an income of £10 from lands in Hertfordshire.

Between about 1438 and his death Shirley rented four shops from St Bartholomew's Hospital. On the basis of manuscripts copied for Shirley, in his hand, or associated with him, some have speculated that Shirley ran a scriptorium or library from these properties. Shirley both translated works from French and Latin and collected and annotated copies of contemporary vernacular authors, such as Chaucer and Lydgate.

Shirley speaks of his own "symple understondynge", and, according to Skeat, he was "an amateur rather than a professional scribe"; but Richard Sellyng (fl. 1450) sent Shirley his poem to revise. (Note: Harley MS 7333, f. 36.) In 1440 he was living "att the full noble, honourable, and renomed cité of London" "in his great and last age". (Note: Add MS 5467, f. 97.)

In Shirley's will, he asked to be buried in the lady chapel at St Bartholomew's Hospital, near his mother and first wife, Elizabeth. His second wife, Margaret, survived him.

His second wife Margaret was the daughter of William Lynne (died 1421), variously described as a ‘wolmongere’, merchant, and grocer, and his wife Alice. Of her four siblings, Robert may have died young, John and Alice Lynne both subsequently married into the Knyvett family of Norfolk, John Lynne acquiring the Knyvett ancestral home of Southwick through his wife Joan, one of the daughters of Sir John Knyvett and Elizabeth, daughter of Constantine, 2nd Lord Clifton (1372–95) of Buckenham Castle. Alice Lynne married her brother, Sir John’s son and heir, also named John Knyvett (1416–91). Margaret Lynne became the second wife of the London scribe John Shirley who died in 1456. Beatrice married firstly Thomas Oxney, and secondly Avery Cornburgh.

Shirley died on 21 October 1456 and was buried at St Bartholomew's. His epitaph was later recorded by Stow, who owned several manuscripts copied by or associated with Shirley. (Note: Stow, Survey of London, ed. Strype, 1720, bk. iii. pp. 232–3.)

== Works ==
Shirley translated from the Latin into English:

1. A full lamentable Cronycle of the dethe and false murdure of James Stewarde, late kynge of Scotys, nought long agone prisoner yn Englande yn the tymes of the kynges Henrye the fift and Henrye the sixte; the manuscript belonged to Ralph Thoresby; (Note: Bernard, Cat. MS. Angliæ, p. 230, No. 7592, art. 6.) it passed from him to John Jackson, on the sale of whose library it was bought by the British Museum, and it now forms ff. 72–97 of Add MS 5467 in the British Library. It was printed by Pinkerton in the appendix to vol. i. of his Ancient Scotish Poems (1786), separately in 1818, and again in 1837 by the Maitland Club. The same manuscript contains two other translations by Shirley.
2. De Bonis Moribus (ff. 97–210), translated out of the French of John de Wiegnay.
3. Secreta Secretorum, or the Governance of Princes (ff. 211–24), translated out of the Latin.

Shirley's main importance was as a transcriber of the works of Chaucer, Lydgate, and others. His collections of their poems, including one or two by himself, are extant in Harley MS 78, 7333, Add MS 16165, Ashmole MS. 59, Trin. Coll. Cambr. MS. R 3, 20, and the Sion MS. of Chaucer, and it is on his authority that the following works are attributed to Chaucer: the ABC, the Complaint to Pity, the Complaint of Mars, Anelida and Arcite, Adam Scriveyn, Fortune, Truth, Gentilnesse, Lak of Stedfastnesse, the Complaint of Venus, and the Complaint to his Empty Purse. (Note: Skeat, Chaucer, i. 25, 53–9, 73.) Harley MS 2251, often ascribed to Shirley, was written in Edward IV's reign, parts of it being copied from one of Shirley's MSS.

== Manuscripts ==
The surviving manuscripts associated with Shirley can be categorized into three groups: those in Shirley's own hand, those that he annotated, and those apparently derived from manuscripts probably owned or annotated by him. Examples of Shirley's hand can be found at the digital project, Late Medieval English Scribes.

Manuscripts copied by Shirley or containing substantial items in his hand include the following:

- Cambridge, Trinity College, MS R.3.20
- British Library, Add. MS 16165 and Harley MS 78, folios 80r–83v
- Lambeth Palace Library, MS Arc. L.40.2/E.44 (formerly at Sion College)
- Oxford, Bodleian Library, MS Ashmole 59
- San Marino, Huntington Library, MS EL 26.A.13

Manuscripts annotated by Shirley or containing his distinctive mark of ownership and motto (a crowned A with the words ma ioye) include the following:

- Cambridge, Corpus Christi College, MS 61
- Cambridge, Gonville and Caius College, MS 669*/646
- Cambridge University Library, MS Ff.1.33
- British Library, Royal MS 20 B XV
- London University Library, MS 1
- New Haven, Yale University Library, Osborn a29 and Takamiya MS 16

Manuscripts apparently or possibly derived in part from exemplars written or annotated by Shirley include the following:

- Cambridge, Trinity College, MS R.3.19 and MS R.3.21
- Cambridge, Mass., Harvard University, Houghton Library, MS Eng 530
- British Library, Add MS 5467, Add. MS 34360, Cotton MS Titus A.xxvi, Harley MS 2251, and Harley MS 7333.

== Bibliography ==
- Pollard, Albert Frederick (1897). "Shirley, John (1366?-1456)" . In Lee, Sidney (ed.). Dictionary of National Biography. Vol. 52. London: Smith, Elder & Co. pp. 133–134.
