= Illegal Contracts Act 1970 =

Act of Parliament in New Zealand

Illegal Contracts Act

New Zealand Parliament
- Long title: An Act to reform the law relating to illegal contracts
- Passed: 1970
- Royal assent: 1 December 1970
- Commenced: 1 December 1970
- Administered by: Ministry of Justice
- Status: Current legislation

The Illegal Contracts Act [1970] is a New Zealand law that manages how contracts are deemed illegal under either common law or under Statute.

Under this law, all such contracts are deemed illegal, but it gives wide discretionary powers to grant relief, including granting orders such as ordering:

- validation (declaring the contract to be either partially or fully enforceable)
- variation of the contract
- restitution
- compensation (damages)

== Cases ==
- Automobile Centre (Auckland) Ltd v Facer
- Barsdell v Kerr
- Catley v Herbert
- Duncan v McDonald
- Fenton v Scotty's Car Sales Ltd
- H & R Block Ltd v Sanott
- Harding v Coburn
- Knyvett v Christchurch Casinos Ltd
- Lower Hutt City Council v Martin
- Mercurius Ventures Ltd v Waitakere City Council
- National Westminster Finance NZ Ltd v South Pacific Rent-a-Car Ltd
- NZI Bank Ltd v Euro-National Corp Ltd
- Polymer Developments Group Ltd v Tilialo
- Re AIC Merchant Finance Ltd (in rec)
- Ross v Henderson
