= John Knyvet (disambiguation) =

John Knyvet (died 1381) was an English lawyer and administrator.

John Knyvet may also refer to:

- John Knyvet (died 1418), MP for Huntingdonshire
- John Knyvet (died 1445), MP for Northamptonshire
