= Alice Knyvet =

English noblewoman

Alice Knyvet (1418 – after 1490) was an English noblewoman, known for her defence of Buckenham Castle during the war of the Roses in 1461.

== Early life ==
Knyvet was born Alice Lynne in 1418 to Alice Stokes (d. 1480) of Kent, and William Lynne of London. Lynne was a successful grocer from London who had acquired several properties over his career. According to historian Roger Virgoe, Alice Stokes likely belonged to the Stokes of Bignell in Oxfordshire, a branch of the noble Harcourt family.

Alice was the fourth of the couple's five children; her siblings were John, Robert, Margaret, and Beatrice. William Lynne died in 1421 while his children were still young. His will left his widow properties in six boroughs of London, which were to remain hers for life on the condition she did not remarry. His estate, which was settled in 1424, also left his children individual inheritances. Alice's inheritance of 350 marks, or £233 6s 8d, was held in trust until she came of age by Thomas Catworth, grocer and later mayor of London. At the time, this sum was substantial for a person who was not a member of the nobility by birth; the wealth Alice eventually inherited would have improved her marriage prospects.

== Marriage ==
Alice married the son of John Knyvet, also named John, in 1430. The Knyvet family was an influential political dynasty in Norfolk, with Alice's father-in-law having served as both Member of Parliament (MP) and Sheriff of Northamptonshire. At the time of Alice's marriage to the younger John Knyvet, however, the Knyvets were experiencing a period of financial hardship. Alice's entry to the family by marriage represented an improvement to their fortunes, which only improved further when Alice's brother, John Lynne, married the elder John Knyvet's daughter Joan.

When the elder John Knyvet died in 1445, his estate was split between Joan and the younger John. In 1447, Alice's husband also inherited Buckenham Castle (sometimes recorded as Bokenham), following the death of a maternal uncle belonging to the Clifton family, the castle's traditional owners. The family also assumed control of the Clifton estates, which represented a comfortable income for the Knyvets.

== Defence of Buckenham Castle ==
During the Wars of the Roses, a series of confrontations between two rival cadet branches of the royal House of Plantagenet, the Knyvet family was sympathetic to the House of Lancaster. Edward IV of the opposing House of York deposed Lancastrian Henry VI as King of England in March 1461. To consolidate power, Edward quickly began confiscating the assets and property of Lancaster's supporters, with Alice's husband John Knyvet among them.

In September 1461, ten royal commissioners and one justice of the peace, John Twyer, attended Buckenham Castle to seize it on the king's behest. John Knyvet was not present. According to historian Audrey Thorstad, it is likely that the king's officials intentionally waited until he was absent, underestimating Alice's ability to independently resist the seizure.

As the group of officials approached, they found that Alice, who had been tasked by John to defend Buckenham, had raised the drawbridge. She had also assembled fifty local men to aid her in protecting the property, arming them with swords, glaives, or bows and arrows. The Knyvets' neighbour, gentleman William Toby, was also present in support of Alice. Alice addressed Twyer directly from a tower:

Maister Twyer, ye be a Justice of the Peace and I require you to keep the peace, for I will not leave possession of this castle to die therefore, and if ye begin to break the peace or make any war to get the place of me I shall defend me, for lever I had in such wise to die than to be slain when my husband cometh home, for he charged me to keep it.

The officials left, concluding that they were "unable to take the castle into the king's hands" due to Alice's actions. No further attempts were made to take Buckenham. The Knyvets next appeared in the parliamentary roll in December 1461, being granted a license to retain their properties and to be pardoned of all "debts, accounts, issues and profits of lands due to the king."

Historians have presented different interpretations of Alice's interaction with Twyer. Mary MacKenzie, biographer of Alice's daughter Christian, suggests that Alice may have sincerely feared reprisals from her husband if she lost the property; her speech was therefore a plea to Twyer. Madeleine Cosman instead assesses that Alice was taunting the officials, and presenting an earnest willingness to fight to the death. Dan Spencer similarly describes Alice's actions as a "show of force," with her defence of Buckenham being a "rare exception" to the pattern of compliance that met most of Edward IV's property seizures.

== Issue and later life ==
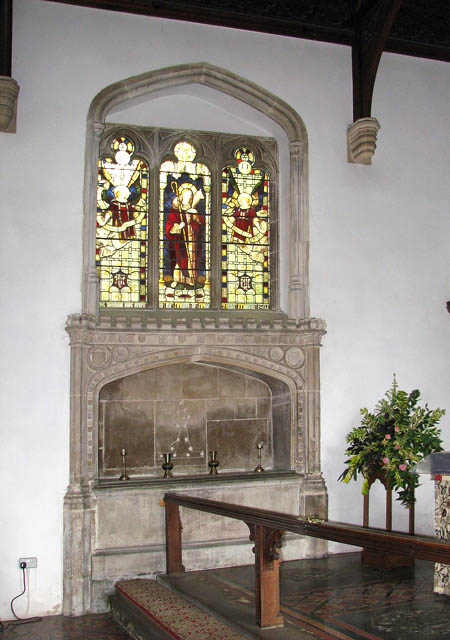
The Easter Sepulchre at St Martin's Church, photographed 2009.

Alice and her husband had four children, including William Knyvet and Christian Colet. Their other children were Elizabeth and Margery.

During the 1470s, John Knyvet may have been in ill health, as he transferred control of the family's Norfolk estates to son William. Alice survived John when he died on New Year's Day in 1490. At this time, she was living apart from him at Carrow Abbey, and it is likely that she died not long afterwards.

Local legend provides that the Easter Sepulchre at St Martin’s Church in New Buckenham once held Alice's remains.
