= New Buckenham Common =

Protected area in Norfolk, England

Coordinates: 52.475°N 1.080°E

- Site of Special Scientific Interest
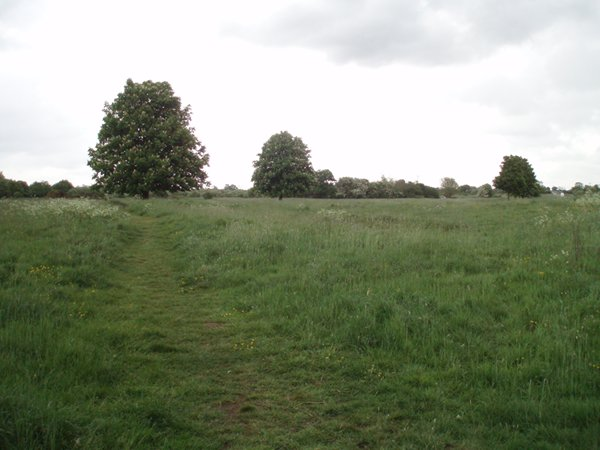
- Location of New Buckenham Common.
- Area of search: Norfolk
- Grid reference: TM 093 908
- Interest: Biological
- Area: 20.9 hectares (52 acres)
- Notification date: 1985
- Location map: Magic Map

New Buckenham Common is a common of which 20.9 hectares (52 acres) is a biological Site of Special Scientific Interest, located in New Buckenham, Norfolk, England. It is managed by the Norfolk Wildlife Trust.

The Common is about 100 acres and is divided roughly in half by 'The Turnpike' B1113 road to Norwich. A stream also crosses the Common. It is said to have remained largely unchanged for 800 years, and was the subject of a dispute when in 1597 the neighboring parish of Carleton Rode claimed part of the common which led to a map which records the settlement.

The land belongs to and is managed by the Norfolk Wildlife Trust. Much of the north side is a Site of Special Scientific Interest (SSSI) with rare plants including green-winged orchids. There are also clay pits where marl has been historically dug for building.

The Common is also an ancient grazing pasture grazed annually by cattle due to the continued tradition of about 79 Common Rights that are actively managed by their owners and pooled for letting to the grazier to continue the tradition. The Common Rights entitle their owners to graze 'a horse, mare or neat beast' (an animal of cloven hoof such as cattle). Historically there was great demand for the annual letting of the Common Rights, which were auctioned for the year's grazing, each Spring, because the grazing of cattle was popular amongst local farmers or householders who might own a beast as a group. Cattle became an important aspect of the region's farming economy after the decline of the wool and sheep trade in the 18th century. Originally the Rights were allocated amongst local houses, in 1770, and are therefore held as whole rights or 14th fractions of rights. By the mid 1960s the demand had fallen; the rightholders formed a group and have continued to let the rights privately to a grazier direct. Some of the rights on the common were lost as they were not registered when required under the Commons Registration Act in the mid 1960s.

Another common exists in New Buckenham: the village green, known as the Market Place.
