= Knevitt =

Knevitt is a surname. Notable people with the surname include:

- Bill Knevitt (fl. 1960s), Australian racing cyclist
- Charles Knevitt (1952–2016), British journalist and author
- Mitch Knevitt (born 2003), Australian rules footballer

== See also ==
- Knyvett, surname
