= Ross v Henderson =

Cited case in New Zealand

- Court: Privy Council
- Full case name: Ewen Neil Ross v John Samuel Lester Henderson
- Decided: 15 November 1977
- Citation: [1977] 2 NZLR 458
- Transcript: Privy Council ruling

Court membership
- Judges sitting: Lord Simon of Glaisdale, Lord Salmon, Lord Russell of Killowen, Lord Keith of Kinkel, Sir Garfield Barwick

Ross v Henderson [1977] 2 NZLR 458 is a cited case in New Zealand regarding illegal contracts that were later upheld that the Illegal Contracts Act 1970 had the power to validate (i.e. make legal) despite the fact that another legal enactment "deemed to be unlawful and shall have no effect".

== Background ==
In 1971, Ross entered into an agreement to a 5-year lease his 345-acre dairy farm to Henderson, with an option to purchase the farm for $65,000.

As leases of 3 years or more are legally required to be registered with the Land Transfer Office, Henderson duly registered the lease, which included the option to purchase.

Unfortunately, the LTO standard declaration form, required under the law, was not designed for such a transaction, and later resulted in Henderson to have breached the law by not registering his purchase, making the sale illegal and of no effect.

In this background, in 1974 Ross's solicitor wrote to Henderson informing him that the sale of the farm had now come to an end.

Henderson filed in court for relief under the Illegal Contracts Act by having the sale agreement validated.

== Held ==
The Privy Council ruled that as the law did not specifically rule out validation, then validation was possible, and given that the law was enacted to prevent undue aggregation of land, and that this was not an issue here, the court upheld the out of Appeals earlier decision to validate the sale agreement.

Footnote: This case is often cited along with the earlier Court of Appeal case of Harding v Coburn [1976] 2 NZLR 577.
