= Anthony Knyvett =

Anthony Knyvett may refer to:

- Anthony Knivet, the pirate, slave and slave trader
- Anthony Knyvett (Black Rod) (c. 1486–1549), held the office of Black Rod in the English Parliament
- Anthony Knyvett (died 1554) (1507–1554), lieutenant of the Tower of London and governor of Portsmouth, executed after Wyatt's Rebellion
