= Duncan v McDonald =

1997 New Zealand court case

- Court: Court of Appeal of New Zealand
- Full case name: Duncan v McDonald
- Decided: 11 August 1997
- Citation: [1997] 3 NZLR 669

Court membership
- Judges sitting: Richardson P, Gault J, Thomas J, Keith J, Blanchard J

Duncan v McDonald [1997] 3 NZLR 669 is a cited case in New Zealand regarding the granting of relief under the Illegal Contracts Act 1970 for illegal contracts.

== Background ==
The McDonalds entered into an illegal scheme with some Nigerians that in return of an investment of $285,000, they would receive $2,000,000. The McDonalds borrowed the money from an estate that Mr Duncan, a solicitor, was managing, and they used a property as security for the loan. Duncan was aware of the illegal nature of the transaction when he lent the money.

Unsurprisingly, the McDonalds were a victim of a Nigerian scam, leaving the McDonalds unable to repay the mortgage on their property, and Duncan sought to enforce the mortgage.

The McDonalds sought to have the mortgage set aside, as it was the result of financing of a crime, whilst Duncan sought validation.

== Decision ==
The court ordered validation of the mortgage, but only to the extent of $75,000.

Footnote: This case is similar to Polymer Developments Group Ltd v Tilialo
