= Re AIC Merchant Finance Ltd (in rec) =

- Court: Court of Appeal of New Zealand
- Full case name: AIC Merchant Finance Ltd (in receivership); National Mutual Life Nominees Ltd v Frederick Nelson Watson & John Gilmour Tuck as receivers of AIC Merchant Finance Ltd
- Decided: 29 November 1989
- Citation: [1990] 2 NZLR 385 (1990) 5 NZCLC 66,153
- Transcript: Court of Appeal judgment

Court membership
- Judges sitting: Richardson J, Casey J, Doogue

Re AIC Merchant Finance Ltd (in rec) [1990] 2 NZLR 385 (1990) 5 NZCLC 66,153 is a cited case in New Zealand regarding relief for Illegal Contracts under the Illegal Contracts Act 1970 where validation is not legally possible.

== Background ==
AIC was a finance company that collapsed in 1986. National Mutual were the trustees for the secured debentured holders. However, briefly between 30 May - 17 July 1986, AIC had not registered with the companies office its new prospectus (no. 3), which was a breach of section 37 of the Securities Act 1978. This technical oversight left the 38 investors that invested $820,000 during this period being unsecured creditors when the company was placed into receivership on 30 August 1986.

National Mutual filed for an order for validation in the High Court, which was refused.

== Held ==
The Court of Appeal again refused validation, as the Securities Act expressly prohibited validation. Richardson J said "[Section] 7 cannot be employed to negate the effect of a provision of the Securities Act. That would be inconsistent with the protection afforded by s 4. It follows that an allotment which is invalid under s 37(4) cannot be validated under s 7." However, as the Securities Act only prohibited validation, and not any other forms of relief, the court granted relief in the form of damages, which was similar to if validation had been granted, effectively granting validation via the back door.
