= NZI Bank Ltd v Euro-National Corp Ltd =

- Court: Court of Appeal of New Zealand
- Full case name: NZI Bank Ltd & Watstone Fifty Seven Ltd & DFC Financial Services Ltd & DFC New Zealand Ltd v Euro-National Corporation Ltd (First Respondent), R M Petricevic (Second Respondent), Petricevic Financial Services Limited (Third Respondent)
- Decided: 12 June 1992
- Citation: [1992] 3 NZLR 528

Court membership
- Judges sitting: Cooke P, Richardson J, Gault J

NZI Bank Ltd v Euro-National Corp Ltd [1992] 3 NZLR 528 is a cited case in New Zealand regarding whether a contract illegal under law, can be subsequently validated under the Illegal Contracts Act 1970.

== Background ==
The employees of Euro-National devised a complicated scheme to purchase Euro-National shares that were financed by Euro-National.

But the time under section 62(1) of the Companies Act [1955] made it illegal for a company to financially assist in the purchase of its own shares (since repealed), although there were numerous exceptions, such as financing share purchases of employees.

Whilst the Act deemed such a transaction "illegal" under the law, the Act did not expressly exclude validation as relief.

As a result, NZI sought validation of the transaction in question.

== Decision ==
As the object of section 62(1) was to protect the interests of the shareholders and creditors of Euro-National, the court refused to grant validation. Richardson J stated "The deficiencies of the present arrangement cannot be categorized as procedural or technical. They go to the heart of the proviso".

Footnote: This case is often contrasted with Catley v Herbert, where a similar transaction that also contravened section 62(1) was validated
