= Catley v Herbert =

- Court: Court of Appeal of New Zealand
- Full case name: Catley v Herbert
- Decided: 14 August 1988
- Citation: [1988] 1 NZLR 606

Court membership
- Judges sitting: Richardson, Somers and Hardie Boys JJ

Catley v Herbert [1988] 1 NZLR 606 is a cited case in New Zealand regarding whether a contract illegal under law, can be subsequently validated under the Illegal Contracts Act 1970.

== Background ==
Catley and Herbert were joint shareholders in a company, and had agreed that Herbert would buy out Catley's shares. This sale entailed the selling of some of the company property in order to purchase his shares. The law saw this as financing the purchase of a company's own shares, which was illegal under section 62 of the Companies Act 1950.

As a result, Herbert refused to pay Catley, on the basis that to do so would be illegal. Catley sought validation of the contract in the court.

== Held ==
Validation of the contract was validated because it did not conflict with the New Zealand Companies Act as it prejudiced no shareholders.

Footnote: This case is often discussed with NZI Bank Ltd v Euro-National Corp Ltd [1992] 3 NZLR 528, where a similar transaction that also contravened section 62(1) was not validated
