= Fenton v Scotty's Car Sales Ltd =

Legal precedent in New Zealand

- Court: High Court of New Zealand
- Full case name: Fenton v Scotty's Car Sales Ltd
- Citation: [1968] NZLR 929

Fenton v Scotty's Car Sales Ltd [1968] NZLR 929 is a cited case in New Zealand regarding the legality of illegal contracts that pre date the Illegal Contracts Act 1970.

== Background ==
Fenton purchased a car from Scotty's Car Sales. The vehicle had no current warrant of fitness at the time of the sale, despite this being required under regulation 53 of the Traffic Regulations 1956. Fenton later tried to have the sale set aside due to this breach.

== Held ==
The court ruled that the object of the Traffic regulations was road safety, and not consumer protection, and accordingly ruled the contract enforceable.

Footnote: Just 3 years earlier in Berrett v Smith [1965] NZLR 460, ruled that a similar warrant of fitness case, the court declared was illegal, and so not legally enforceable.
