= H&R Block Ltd v Sanott =

- Court: High Court of New Zealand
- Full case name: H&R Block Ltd v Sanott
- Decided: 13 August 1975
- Citation: [1976] 1 NZLR 213

Court membership
- Judge sitting: Somers J

H&R Block Ltd v Sanott [1976] 1 NZLR 213 is a cited case in New Zealand regarding the legality of restraint of trade clauses under the Illegal Contracts Act 1970.

== Background ==
Sanott was employed as a manager of H&R Block's Christchurch office. After a falling out between them, Sannott resigned and set up in competition to them.

H&R Block sought to enforce his restraint of trade clause excluding him for operating within 25 miles of their Christchurch office for the next 5 years.

== Held ==
The court found the restraint of trade clause was unreasonable, and modified it to excluding operating within 5 miles, for 3 years. Somers J said "The provisions of s 8 were intended to overcome the annihilating effect of the common law rules about excessive restraints and to alter those rules as to severance".

== See also ==
- Illegal Contracts Act 1970
