= William Knyvett =

William Knyvett may refer to:

- William Knyvett (singer) (1779–1856), British singer and composer
- William Knyvett (athlete) (1882–1929), British track and field athlete at the 1908 Summer Olympics
- Sir William Knyvett (died 1515), English knight
