= Mercurius Ventures Ltd v Waitakere City Council =

- Court: High Court of New Zealand
- Full case name: Mercurius Ventures Ltd v Waitakere City Council
- Decided: 7 March 1996
- Citation: [1996] 2 NZLR 495

Court membership
- Judge sitting: Anderson J

Mercurius Ventures Ltd v Waitakere City Council [1996] 2 NZLR 495 is a cited case in New Zealand regarding whether a contract illegal under law, can be subsequently validated under the Illegal Contracts Act 1970.

== Background ==
The Waitakere City Council sought to appoint a business development officer for the city. After interviewing numerous applicants for the position, the council decided to hire Ms Howe, and offered her a starting annual salary of $80,000. In reply to this offer, Howe said that as she had been earning $120,000 a year self-employed for the past 2 years.

WDC then increased the starting salary to $100,000, which Howe accepted. However, thinking of the advantages (and not the disadvantages) of being a self-employed contractor, she asked the council if they would consider hiring her as a contractor for $120,000, which the council accepted, and Howe started work whilst the written contract was being drafted.

Several months into the contract, due to an unworkable relationship with the WDC management, they notified Howe that they were canceling her contract, giving 1 months notice. The council claimed that such a contract had to be in writing, and as the contract had not been done, they claimed it was legally unenforceable.

Howe initially made a claim for wrongful dismissal with the Employment Court, but withdrew this when she realized she was not an employee, but a contractor, and proceeded to file a claim for breach of contract instead.

During the discovery proceedings, the WDC discovered that her previous 2 years earnings were overstated, and they amended their defence to include misrepresentation.

== Decision ==
The court validated the contract and awarded her damages of 1 month, $12,000.
