= National Westminster Finance NZ Ltd v South Pacific Rent-a-Car Ltd =

- Court: Court of Appeal of New Zealand
- Full case name: National Westminster Finance NZ Ltd v South Pacific Rent-a-Car Ltd (First Defendant) and B Mullaly (Second Defendant)
- Decided: 13 September 1984
- Citation: [1985] 1 NZLR 646

Court membership
- Judges sitting: Richardson J, Somers J, Eichelbaum J

National Westminster Finance NZ Ltd v South Pacific Rent-a-Car Ltd [1985] 1 NZLR 646 is a cited case in New Zealand regarding the validation of illegal contracts under the Illegal Contracts Act 1970.

== Background ==
South Pacific ran a Christchurch-based rental car agency. Over the years, it had purchased 80 cars under hire purchase from the NZ Motor Corporation, paying a 10% deposit, plus a further 15% in instalments over the next 8 months, with the NZMC purchasing the vehicles back.

Problems arose however in 1979, when Mr Mullaly sold the company to another company owned by Mr Cooper, after his lawyer advised him that these agreements were illegal, as under the Hire Purchase and Credit Sales Stabilisation Regulations 1957, hire purchase agreements are illegal if they have a deposit of less than 60%.

As a result, Cooper took the drastic action of demanding that the finance company take all the vehicles back, which the duly did, and after selling the vehicles, sent South Pacific a demand for $44,922.74, as well as to Mr Mullaly under his personal guarantee.

After neither party was prepared to pay, the finance company sued both parties. South Pacific lodged a counter-claim that as the contracts were illegal, not only were they not liable for the shortfall, that they were also entitled to the $55,238.14 that they had paid under these contracts to be refunded, and NatWest subsequently filed in the court for a validation order.

== Held ==
The court made an order for validation of the HP contracts, but only on the basis that they first release Mr Mullaly from his guarantee.
