= Lower Hutt City Council v Martin =

1987 New Zealand legal case

Lower Hutt City Council v Patricia Martin
- Court: High Court of New Zealand
- Full case name: Lower Hutt City Council v Patricia Gawith Martin
- Decided: 27 March 1987
- Citation: [1987] 1 NZLR 321
- Transcript: http://www.nzlii.org/nz/cases/NZHC/1987/75.pdf

Court membership
- Judge sitting: Heron J

Lower Hutt City Council v Martin [1987] 1 NZLR 321 is a cited case in New Zealand regarding the validation of contracts under the Illegal Contracts Act 1970.

== Background ==
Patricia Martin worked for 8 1/2 years as a librarian at the Lower Hutt City Council. Upon her resignation in 1979, her employment contract entitled her to a gratuity of $878.24, a gratuity that was standard practice of the council that had been paying all its departing staff since 1952.

Unfortunately for Martin, the year before in 1978, the council became aware that under section 6(2) of the Finance Act (no 2) 1941, only gave local authorities the ability to pay such gratuities if the person had been employed for more than 10 years.

The council went to court to resolve this issue, and the District Court validated the gratuity. The council appealed.

== Held ==
The High Court of New Zealand overturned the validation order, on the basis that to validate was against public policy. Heron J stated "I think here there is considerable force in [counsel's] submission that where one is considering ultra vires conduct in respect of a statutory body such as a local body under the Local Government Act and not just an unlawful activity otherwise intra vires, wide considerations of public interest apply".

Footnote: The Court of Appeal in Wellington Regional Council v Edwards ERNZ 100, 107; [1997] 2 NZLR 129, 138 validated a similar council gratuity.
