= Barsdell v Kerr =

- Court: High Court of New Zealand
- Full case name: Barsdell v Kerr
- Decided: 1979
- Citation: [1979] 2 NZLR 731

Court membership
- Judge sitting: Quilliam J

Keywords
- illegal contracts

Barsdell v Kerr [1979] 2 NZLR 731 is New Zealand case frequently cited with Mall Finance v Slater [1976] 2 NZLR 685 and Polymer Developments v Tilialo [2002] 3 NZLR 258 regarding illegal contracts prejudicial to the administration of justice under the Illegal Contracts Act [1970].

== Background ==
Barsdell ran a dental practice, and employed Mr Barker as a dental technician there. When Barsdell later discovered that this employee had sexually assaulted some of his female patients there whilst they were under anaesthesia, Barsdell procured the victims silence through making payments of compensation to the victims husbands totaling $20,000. In return, Barker had given Barsdell a promissory note to reimburse him for these payments, stating "For valuable consideration received, I agree to pay the sum of twenty thousand dollars($20,000)to my very old friend and employer GLH Barsdell", and had used Mr Kerr, a solicitor, who was a visiting client, to witness the deed of gift. Barker at the same time changed his will, adding the provision to leave Barsdell $20,000 from his estate.

However, Barker soon had a change of mind about paying the $20,000, and removed Barsdell from his will. An event which was rather untimely, as Barker soon died after this. To further complicate matters, Barsdell soon died as well, leaving his widow (and executrix of his estate) to try and collect on the note from Barkers estate, whom Kerr was named as the executor.

Kerr refused to honour the note, as by now he had discovered the true nature of the transaction, claiming as it was contrary to public policy, thus legally unenforceable.

Barsdell sought validation in the court for validation under the Illegal Contracts Act [1970]

== Held ==
Validation for the promissory note was refused, as the consideration for the promissory note was illegal. Quilliam J said "I am satisfied, however, that this is not the kind of situation which the [Illegal Contracts] Act was intended to cover... I consider wrong in principle to apply the Act in such a case"
