= Automobile Centre (Auckland) Ltd v Facer =

Case in New Zealand contract law

- Court: High Court of New Zealand
- Full case name: Automobile Centre (Auckland) Ltd v Facer
- Decided: 6 August 1974
- Citation: [1974] 2 NZLR 767

Court membership
- Judge sitting: Cooke J

Keywords
- illegal contracts

Automobile Centre (Auckland) Ltd v Facer [1974] 2 NZLR 767 is an often cited case regarding illegal contracts under the Illegal Contracts Act 1970. It was one of the first cases decided since the law was passed.

== Background ==
Automobile Centre sold Facer a car. The car did not have a Warrant of Fitness that lasted more than the 5 months that regulation 53 of the Transport Regulations 1956 legally requires, with a penalty upon conviction, of a fine.

Facer subsequently used this breach of the law to not pay for the car, claiming the contract was illegal. and thus not legally enforceable.

The car dealer ultimately sued Facer to obtain payment.

== Held ==
The court ruled that the Regulations' purpose was road safety, and not consumer protection as Facer had argued. That being the case, the judge noted that the interests of road safety could be served by fines rather than go as far as making the purchases illegal, and ruled that Facer was liable to pay for the car.
