= John Knyvet (died 1418) =

Member of the Parliament of England

John Knyvet (1358/9–1418), of Mendlesham, Suffolk, was an English Member of Parliament (MP) for Huntingdonshire in September 1397.

Knyvet was the son of John Knyvet (d. 1381), who was the Lord Chancellor of England in 1372–1377, and his wife Eleanor (d. 1388), the daughter of Ralph Basset (d.1341).

By 1377, Knyvet married Joan, daughter and heiress of John Boutetout (d. by 1377) and Katherine. Knyvet's first wife died around 1417. Knyvet's second wife was Joan, who died around 1429.

From his first marriage, Knyvet was the father of a younger John Knyvett, who was MP for Northamptonshire in 1421.

Knyvet died at Mendlesham on 4 December 1418.
