= The Complaint of Mars =

Short poem by Geoffrey Chaucer

The Complaint of Mars, is one of Geoffrey Chaucer's short poems that has elicited a variety of critical commentary. While this poem has been seen as allegorical, astronomical, and interpretive-appreciative in nature, a number of critics have examined the poem only as a description of an astronomical event. While this event is evident in the story, the discrepancies between the story and the actual condition in the skies has provided a useful examination of astrological beliefs in Chaucer's time.

== Summary ==
The story begins with the days leading up to April 12, 1385, as Venus, the goddess of love, and Mars, the god of war, have planned an affair. Before they are to meet, Venus teaches Mars a lesson in understanding and care. She instructs Mars never to despise any lover and forbids that he feels jealousy, tyranny, cruelty, or arrogance ever again. Once he has been humbled by Venus' power and promises to obey her command, Mars waits patiently for Venus to meet him so they can have an affair. Together, Mars and Venus reigned over the skies until, finally, the time came for Mars to enter the house of Venus at his slowed pace until she finally overtook him. Unfortunately, Mars and Venus are then broken up by Phebus, the god of the sun. He burst hastily through the palace gates, while Venus and Mars are still in the bed chambers, and shined his light on the situation.

As the now helpless, married Venus began to weep and flee the scene, Mars began to cry tears of sparks and prepared himself for a battle with Phebus. While he had no intention of fighting the Sun, Mars was only dragged down by the added weight of his armor. As the fiery sparks burst from Mars' eyes, he threw on his helmet and began to strap on his sword. Because Mars was so distraught and weighed down, he began to shake to the point where his armor broke into several pieces. He was in no condition to fight Phebus, so Mars began to follow Venus. Though fate had determined that the two lovers would never be together, Mars was forced to follow Venus slowly, as she fled to avoid confronting Phebus. As Mars is weighted down by his armor, he is unable to move swiftly enough to reunite with his love.

== Mars's Lament ==
The lament of Mars is a five-part list of complaints stating Mars' grievances regarding his broken-up affair with Venus. However, Chaucer states that in order to complain skillfully, there must be a defined cause. Essentially, without specific reason, the man complaining would be seen as foolish. Mars, on the other hand, is not without cause. Chaucer instead uses this time to declare the pain Mars is experiencing and, rather than expecting a remedy, expects to declare the grounds for the heaviness he is feeling:

The ordre of compleynt requireth skylfully
That yf a wight shal pleyne pitously,
Ther mot be cause wherfore that men pleyne;
Or men may deme he pleyneth folily
And causeles; alas, that am not I.
Wherfore the ground and cause of al my peyne,
So as my troubled wit may hit atteyne,
I wol reherse; not for to have redresse,
But to declare my ground of hevynesse.

=== I. ===
First, Mars begins to reminisce about how God rules over all intelligence and, although Mars gave Him all of his service and loyalty, he has been fated never to see his love again. This section is spent discussing the beneficial attributes of Venus. While she is well endowed with fortune and virtue and the melody of all sweet instruments, Mars cannot see past this lovesick infatuation with a woman he will never see again. Yet, his heart has been promised to Venus and he swears never to love again until he dies, as he plans to die in her service; unless mercy is granted, he will never set his eyes on her again.

=== II. ===
While it is clear that Mars is in distress as he continues his lament, he seems concerned when considering who will hear his complaints. For Mars cannot spend his time complaining to Venus, as she is only causing him heaviness from the pain, fear, and sorrow she has left him with. It seems that most of Mars' worry stems from his uncertainty about her safety and well-being. Sometimes, Mars claims, ladies have no pity on the men that they leave behind, as jealousy engulfs them and they begin to devote themselves to death. Women cannot please anyone, as Mars believes only the false lover has any comfort since love does not actually exist except to cause distress.

=== III. ===
Mars begins to examine the meaning of love as God had created. Why should people be constrained to love in spite of themselves? While people can only be hurt by heartbreak, Mars sees that the joy of love lasts for only the split second that an eye twinkles. Why do people want love so eagerly, as it is only a pain which they must endure? Mars continues to marvel that God would create such a cruelty that would either break His people, causing more sorrow than the moon changes.

=== IV. ===
Mars compares his love for Venus to the love men have for the brooch of Thebes. He claims that Venus and the brooch are both precious, rarely found in nature, and so beautiful that they grip the heart of any man that lays their eyes upon them. Yet, Mars had foregone this treasure and lost her to fate. Thus, Mars blames God again for his loss, as He is responsible for creating Venus' beauty, sparking Mars' fascination and thus, driving him to death without her.

=== V. ===
In all, Mars concludes his lament with an admission to the pain and sorrow he feels. Instead of continuing to blame higher powers for his distress, Mars simply asks for pity and kindness. He asks that ladies, though naturally and steadfastly beautiful, must have mercy on the men whose hearts they break. Men must not be greatly disappointed in beauty, bounty, courtesy and never deeply regret women who were ever held dear. Overall, men should show kindness toward these women as they cannot control fate.

== Proposed astrological connection ==
While the story insinuates that the gods are having a love affair, in reality the story is describing a purely astronomical occurrence. At this point in 1385, the planetary orbitals of Mars and Venus had both entered the house of Taurus. From Earth, this looked like the planets had almost overlapped and become one. Yet, because Mars has a much larger planetary orbital than Venus, it seemed as though the planet was moving much slower in the sky. Thus, Mars was depicted as gliding slowly to eventually meet up with Venus in her palace. When Phoebus breaks up the unexpecting couple's love affair, astronomically the sun had entered the house of Taurus as well, literally shining its rays on the planets. With his torch in hand, Phebus not only exposed the affair of Venus and Mars, but drove them away from their position in the house of Taurus.

After the separation of Mars and Venus in the story, the planets appeared to move apart in the sky. Yet, because of the size of their planetary orbitals, Venus appeared to move away from the house of Taurus much more quickly than Mars. Thus, Chaucer uses the image of Mars wearing heavy armor as a means of explaining the natural phenomena. Altogether, the "Complaint of Mars" serves as an allegory for the astrological phenomena that occurred in April 1385. While this date is still under some debate, the astrological facts are presented as undertones for Chaucer's poem.

== Original Roman Myth ==
Adaptations of Roman myths were popular amongst many authors of the Middle Ages, and Chaucer wrote several poems in this vein, like The Complaint of Mars. Chaucer's depiction of Mars and Venus does not stray far from the original myth. However, some changes are notable.

=== Absence of Vulcan ===
According to Roman mythology, Vulcan—the god of blacksmithing and forging, son of Jupiter and Juno—was so ugly that no woman would ever marry him. Zeus then forced the reluctant Venus into a marriage with Vulcan so that he would have a wife:

The betrothal gifts I [Hephaistos] bestowed on him [Zeus] for his wanton daughter [Aphrodite].

Despite being his wife, this did not stop Venus from engaging in multiple affairs with mortals and gods alike. Some of the most notable of her partners are the human Adonis (who was killed by a boar), the mortal Anchises, Bacchus, Mars, and a number of other Roman gods. Mars, being the most famous of her lovers, is depicted in various medieval poems and literature.

However, in Chaucer's iteration of the famous affair between the goddess of love and the god of war, Vulcan is mysteriously absent. In the original myth, Vulcan is a key character in how the adulterous affair is exposed. In the original myth, Phebus(the sun) does initially "expose" the relationship by informing Vulcan of its existence. However, it is Vulcan who reveals his wife's cheating to the rest of the Olympian gods, not Phebus like in Chaucer's iteration.

Sol [Helios the Sun] is thought to have been the first to see Venus' [Aphrodite's] adultery with Mars [Ares]: Sol is the first to see all things. Shocked at the sight he told the goddess' husband, Junonigena [Hephaistos], how he was cuckolded where. Then Volcanus' [Hephaistos'] heart fell, and from his deft blacksmith's hands fell too the work he held. At once he forged a net, a mesh of thinnest links of bronze, too fine for eye to see, a triumph not surpassed by finest threads of silk or by the web the spider hands below the rafters' beam. He fashioned it to respond to the least touch or slightest movement; then with subtle skill arranged it round the bed. So when his wife lay down together with her paramour, her husband's mesh, so cleverly contrived, secured them both ensnared as they embraced. Straightway Lemnius [Hephaistos] flung wide the ivory doors and ushered in the gods. The two lay there, snarled in their shame. The gods were not displeased; one of them prayed for shame like that. They laughed and laughed; the joyful episode was long the choicest tale to go the rounds of heaven.

=== The Sun ===
In The Complaint of Mars, the Sun, referred to as Phebus, shines his light of Venus and Mars, exposing their affair, allowing all the gods to see them together. After Venus runs away, the two engage in battle.

However, in the original Roman myth, Phebus does not expose Venus and Mars' adulterous affair. Instead, he happens upon the two and reports to Vulcan. Instead Vulcan, infuriated, creates a net to trap the couple when he eventually catches the pair in bed together:

When Vulcanus [Hephaistos] knew that Venus [Aphrodite] was secretly lying with Mars [Ares], and that he could not oppose his strength, he made a chain of adamant and put it around the bed to catch Mars by cleverness. When Mars came to the rendezvous, the together with Venus fell into the snare so that he could not extricate himself. When Sol [Helios the sun] reported this to Vulcanus, he saw them lying there naked, and summoned all the gods who saw.

However, Phebus takes on a much more dominant role in The Complaint of Mars. Chaucer's Phebus fills the roles of both Phebus and Vulcan from the original myth, consolidated into one character, although he is not married to Venus. In Chaucer's interpretation of the tale, which is rooted in the movement of the planets more so than the actions of the gods, Vulcan's absence does not change the narrative of the story too much.

== A Valentine's Day Poem ==
By 1400, numerous groups publicly celebrated Saint Valentine's Day. To celebrate the event, many romantic poems and stories were read on the holiday, such as the well known The Complaint of Mars.

Not only was The Complaint of Mars popular within some social groups, but gained immense popularity at court amongst nobles and aristocrats of the period as well. The work was distinctly "a Valentine's Day poem. Valentine's Day was also observed as a court holiday and did not filter down until later."

Not only are instances such as these documenting the poem's romantic significance, but the text itself alludes to Saint Valentine and his holiday.

There are several allegories that signify that The Complaint of Mars is a Valentine's Day poem, such as the references to fouls, or birds. Saint Valentine himself was often depicted as a "patron of the mating of birds and human lovers" in medieval poetry, although it is still not known specifically why or how the saint became associated with birds and lovers. In medieval literature, birds have a strong connection to human extramarital affairs, or in Mars and Venus' case, celestial affairs. In the beginning of the poem, Chaucer makes clear reference to birds and their connection to love in lines (1–4) and (13–14):

"Gladeth, ye foules of the morowe gray!
Lo! Venus, rysen among yon roses rede!
And floures fressh, honoureth ye this day;
For when the sunne uprist, then wol ye sprede."
—————
"Seynt Valentyne, a foul thus herde I synge
Upon thy day, er sonne gan up-sprynge."

To further support the link between birds and romance, "there is the well-known folk belief that birds were supposed to choose their mates on Saint Valentine's and that human beings thought they must follow this example in choosing their own lovers". Chaucer did not employ this bird allegory only in The Complaint of Mars, but also his other romantic poem Parlement of Foules, which was often read on Saint Valentine's.
