= Anthony Knyvett (died 1554) =

English rebel during the reign of Mary I of England

Anthony Knyvett (c. 1507 – 1 March 1554) was an English courtier during the reign of King Henry VIII who rebelled during the reign of Queen Mary I.

== Background ==
Knyvett was born in London, the son of Charles Knyvett (son of Sir William Knyvett) by his wife Anne Lacy (d.1562), the daughter and heiress of Walter Lacy of London by his wife Lucy. Knyvett's father served his kinsmen, the Duke of Buckingham and John Bourchier, 2nd Baron Berners, the Deputy of Calais.

== Career ==
Knyvett was knighted after 15 November 1538, while serving as Porter of Calais.

Knyvett was Lieutenant of the Tower of London and is mentioned in Foxe's Book of Martyrs for refusing to continue torturing the Protestant Anne Askew on the rack. He was made Governor of Portsmouth in 1544 and oversaw the building of Southsea Castle in that year.

In 1554, Knyvett joined Wyatt's Rebellion and was routed at the Battle of Hartley. He was executed at the Tower of London on 1 March 1554.
