= New Buckenham =

Village in Norfolk, England

Coordinates: 52.472°N 1.073°E

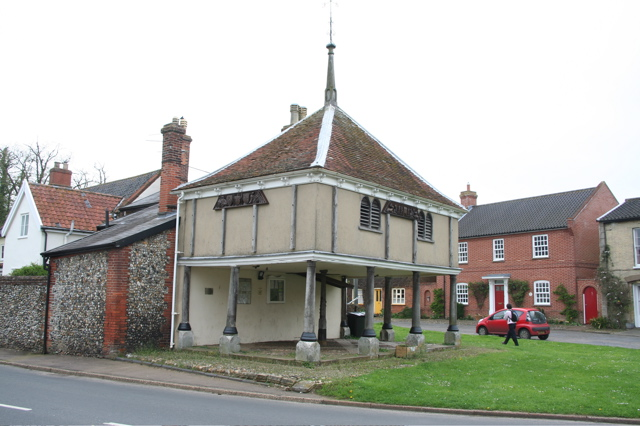
- Market Cross

- Location within Norfolk
- Area: 1.73 km^{2} (0.67 sq mi)
- Population: 460 (2011)
  - Density: 266/km^{2} (690/sq mi)
- OS grid reference: TM087904
  - London: 97 miles (156 km)
- Civil parish: New Buckenham
- District: Breckland
- Shire county: Norfolk
- Region: East
- Country: England
- Sovereign state: United Kingdom
- Post town: NORWICH
- Postcode district: NR16
- Dialling code: 01953
- Police: Norfolk
- Fire: Norfolk
- Ambulance: East of England
- UK Parliament: Mid Norfolk

New Buckenham is a village and civil parish in the English county of Norfolk.

The parish covers an area of 1.73 km^{2} (0.67 sq mi) and had a population of 468 in 197 households at the 2001 census, falling marginally to a population of 460 in 209 households at the 2011 census. The small parish includes only the village, New Buckenham Common and some outlying houses and farmland. It is in the local government district of Breckland.

A nucleated village, New Buckenham has a medieval grid plan encompassing a green that originally served as the market place. At the green there is a historic market house, a grade II-star listed building which features a whipping post, and commonly called the Market Cross. The village entirely comprises a conservation area together with the adjacent Buckenham Castle, which lies in the neighbouring parish of Old Buckenham.

== Correct pronunciation ==
"Bucknum" The emphasis is placed upon the vowel in the first syllable. "Bucknum"

== Geography ==
The B1113 road passes through the village, diagonally over the green, and then across the Common. This road runs to the city of Norwich, 15 miles (24 km) distant to the north east. The nearest towns are Attleborough and Diss, where there are mainline railway stations.

In general, the land slopes slightly downhill towards the south and the centre of the village lies at an elevation of around 46 metres (151 ft) above sea level. A small watercourse (or "beck" in Norfolk dialect) runs across the Common and then along the southern edge of the village.

The parish borders the parishes of Banham, Old Buckenham and Carleton Rode. The nearby hamlet of Dam Brigg lies in the parish of Banham.

== History ==
=== A planned town ===
New Buckenham was founded in the 12th century by William d’Aubigny to accompany his new castle in the manor of Buckenham. The site had a common to the east and a limited area of arable land (the Haugh field) to the south.

The town was planned on a grid pattern and surrounded by a substantial wet moat that connected to the castle's moat. In some places the moat was up to nine metres wide and three metres deep with an internal bank. It was referred to as the ‘burgh ditch’ in 1493 and the area within it was known as ‘the burgage’. By 1600 the moat was no longer being maintained and was becoming clogged with rubbish. in 1632 Charles Gosling, the owner of the Rookery, was given leave to build a barn across it.

New Buckenham remained a market centre and was joined to Norwich by a turnpike road in 1772. However, it never grew into a larger settlement, and by the mid-19th century markets were no longer held although a small number of annual fairs were. The population peaked in the first half of the 19th century, with 795 inhabitants recorded in the 1831 census.

The village has largely retained its original layout for which, according to the Pevsner for Norfolk, ‘it deserves to be better known’, and there has been little development beyond its medieval boundaries. In Norfolk from the Air I, New Buckenham is described as ‘a rare example of a Norman planned town that has not significantly expanded outside or shrunk within its original boundaries’. The original plan would have been altered by the foundation of the parish church between 1243 and the end of the thirteenth century. It was further modified by building over the southern part of the market place which had occurred by 1529: its original limit is marked by Boosey's Walk. Later expansions of the settlement have occurred at Marsh Lane in the south and St Martin's Gardens in the north.

There remains a wealth of half-timbered housing hidden behind 18th and 19th century brick frontages, and forty buildings in the village are Grade II listed. The green is a registered common and is still called the Market Place although no market or trading fair is now held in New Buckenham.

=== Victorian ===
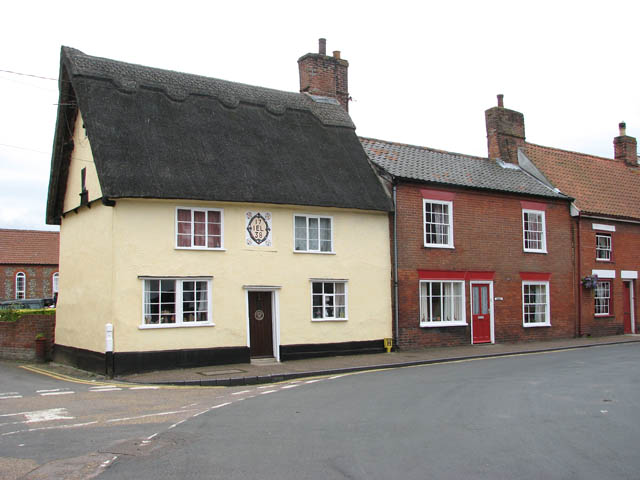
Tudor Rose Cottage on King Street

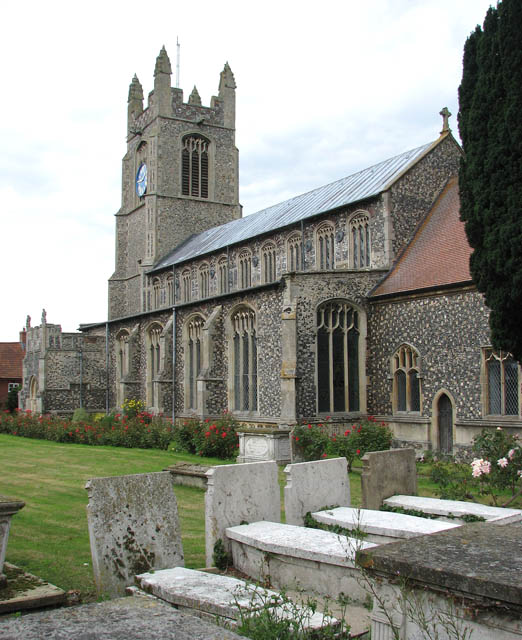
St. Martin's church tower with its sizeable clock that faces towards the Market Place

New Buckenham Silver Band was created in 1887 to celebrate Queen Victoria's Golden Jubilee and continues as one of the older brass bands in East Anglia.

One of the two current pubs in the village, historically the George Hotel but now named the Inn on the Green, was built in 1898 as a railway hostelry in anticipation of the construction of a railway line that failed to materialise.

== Community ==
=== Governance ===
There is a parish council that meets once a month.

Since 2015, New Buckenham is in The Buckenhams & Banham ward of Breckland district, which returns one councillor to the district council. Since 2010, the parish is part of the Parliamentary constituency of Mid Norfolk.

The green, Market Cross, church clock and Chapel Hill pump are maintained by a charitable trust called The High Bailiff's Trust.

Historically the parish was part of the hundred of Shropham.

=== Amenities ===
As of 2019 the village has two public houses (the Inn on the Green and The King's Head), and on King Street there is a convenience store, with a post office counter, and next door a tearoom. The Inn on the Green closed permanently in 2020 and planning permission has been granted for its conversion to residential use.

A modern village hall and playing field exists on the northern edge of the village, and a separate cricket field lies in a corner of the Common, home to the village club.

New Buckenham's calendar includes a traditional fête held on the August Bank Holiday, and a community gathering called the "Hair of the Dog Walk" which takes place on New Year's Day.

=== Religion ===
The historic parish church, now a grade I listed building, is dedicated to Saint Martin and is a Church of England property, coming under the diocese of Norwich.

There were also Primitive and Wesleyan Methodist churches in the village; the Primitive chapel was on Marsh Lane whilst the Wesleyan chapel was on Chapel Lane — both have been converted to houses. Until 2018 the school room adjacent to the Wesleyan chapel continued to be used by the Methodists but has now also been sold.

== Notable residents ==
- Poet, children's author and hymn writer Emily Taylor (1795–1872) was brought up in the village and ran a school there.
- Biblical scholar, writer, and minister Joseph Bryant Rotherham (1828–1910) was born there.
