= Harding v Coburn =

New Zealand court case

- Court: Court of Appeal of New Zealand
- Full case name: Harding v Coburn
- Decided: 22 July 1976
- Citation: [1976] 2 NZLR 577

Court membership
- Judges sitting: Sir Clifford RichmondJ, Woodhouse J, Cooke J

Keywords
- illegal contracts

Harding v Coburn [1976] 2 NZLR 577 was a New Zealand case that was one of the first that upheld that the Illegal Contracts Act 1970 had the power to validate (i.e. make legal) despite the fact that another legal enactment "deemed to be unlawful and shall have no effect".

== Background ==
Harding sold their farm to Coburn. Unfortunately, the parties neglected to get the sale approved by the Court, as required under s25(4) of the Land Settlement Promotion and Land Acquisition Act [1952]. Under this Act, failure to obtain such a consent made the sale "unlawful and shall have no effect".

As a consequence, Coburn sought the relief of validation under section 7 of the Illegal Contracts Act 1970. Harding's lawyers argued that as the sale was illegal under the Land Settlement Promotion and Land Acquisition Act, there was no legally enforceable sale agreement.

== Decision ==
The Court of Appeal ruled that the courts had the power to validate contracts that are deemed illegal unless the other Act expressly prohibits validation under the Illegal Contracts Act.
