= Francis Mountford =

English Member of Parliament

Francis Mountford (1474/76–1536), of the Inner Temple, London and Feltwell, Norfolk, was an English Member of Parliament.

Mountford owed much of his political career to his connections through his marriage to a member of the Thursby family.

== Life ==
Mountford was the son of Osbert Mountford of Feltwell and Elizabeth, daughter of Francis Heath of Mildenhall, Suffolk. He was born about 1474.

Mountford's first wife was Margaret, daughter of Thomas Thursby of Lynn, Norfolk. He married secondly Gertrude, daughter of Robert Hoting of London.

Mountford was a Member of Parliament (MP) for Lynn in 1510 and again in 1512. He may possibly have been one of the MPs for Norwich in 1523, as the names of the members from Norwich are unknown for that Parliament.

Mountford died on 8 August 1536.
