= Thomas Knyvet =

Thomas Knyvet or Knyvett is the name of:

- Thomas Knyvett (died 1512), English nobleman
- Thomas Knyvett (died 1569), MP for Brackley (UK Parliament constituency), Bramber and Plymouth
- Thomas Knyvett, 4th Baron Berners (1539–1616), English nobleman
- Thomas Knyvet, 1st Baron Knyvet (1558–1622), English nobleman, MP for Westmorland and Westminster
  - Thomas Knyvett College, in Ashford, Surrey, England
- Thomas Knyvet (died 1605), MP for Aldeburgh and Thetford
- Thomas Knyvett (parliamentary official) (died 1637), English parliamentary officer
- Thomas Knyvett, 5th Baron Berners (1598–1658), JP and Royalist
- Thomas Knyvett, 7th Baron Berners (c. 1660–1693), English nobleman
