= Knyvett v Christchurch Casinos Ltd =

- Court: Court of Appeal of New Zealand
- Full case name: Knyvett v Christchurch Casinos Ltd
- Decided: 17 December 1998
- Citation: [1999] 2 NZLR 559

Court membership
- Judges sitting: Blanchard, Gallen and Salmon JJ

Knyvett v Christchurch Casinos Ltd [1999] 2 NZLR 559 is a cited case in New Zealand regarding whether a contract illegal under statute, can be subsequently validated under the Illegal Contracts Act 1970.

== Background ==
Polglase won a $31,173.71 jackpot at the Christchurch Casino, however when the casino later discovered that he was only 18 years old, a minor, they refused to pay him out his winnings.

The Casino argued that under the Casino Control Act 1990, gambling by a minor is illegal, and thus honouring any wager would be illegal under the Act.

However, the Act only prohibited a minor being on the premises of a Casino, it did not go as far as stating that any bets would be illegal as well.

The casino successfully obtained a judgment from the High Court.

Polglase, via his guardian Knyvett appealed.

== Decision ==
The court refused to grant relief.
