= Carleton Rode =

Village and civil parish in Norfolk, England

Coordinates: 52.490°N 1.114°E

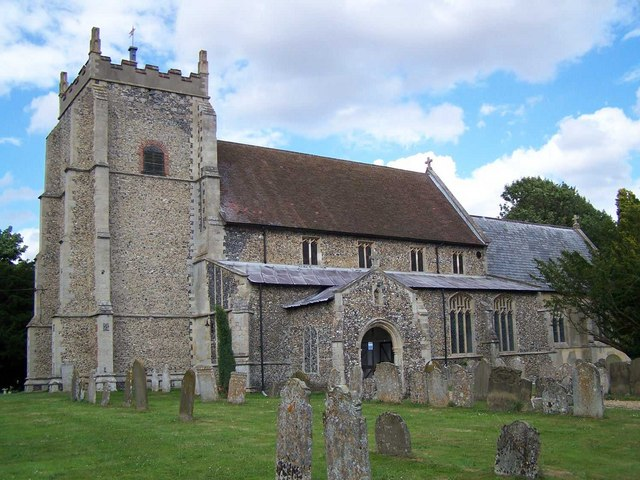
- All Saints Church

- Location within Norfolk
- Area: 10.91 km^{2} (4.21 sq mi)
- Population: 837 (2021)
  - Density: 77/km^{2} (200/sq mi)
- OS grid reference: TM114926
- Civil parish: Carleton Rode
- District: South Norfolk
- Shire county: Norfolk
- Region: East
- Country: England
- Sovereign state: United Kingdom
- Post town: NORWICH
- Postcode district: NR16
- Dialling code: 01953
- Police: Norfolk
- Fire: Norfolk
- Ambulance: East of England
- UK Parliament: Waveney Valley

Carleton Rode is a civil parish in the English county of Norfolk. It is 4 miles (6.4 km) south-east of Attleborough and 12 miles (19 km) south-west of Norwich.

At the 2021 census the parish had a population of 837, an increase from 785 at the 2011 census. There is no central settlement within the parish, with clusters of buildings at the hamlets of Flaxlands, Upgate Street, and Hargate, as well as at Carleton Rode itself.

== History ==
Early settlement in the parish dates to the prehistoric period with a range of archaeological finds from the Palaeolithic, Mesolithic, and Neolithic. A hoard of more than 20 Bronze Age metal objects was discovered in 1844, and Beaker pottery from the same period suggests settlement during this period. An Iron Age hoard was discovered in 2004 and Roman era objects have been found at more than 20 sites, with the possibility that a Roman road ran along the western edge of the parish.

Settlement continued in to the Saxon period, with many of the Roman sites continuing in use. In the Domesday Book the parish is recorded as Carletuna, a name of Anglo-Saxon or Norse origin meaning "enclosure of the free peasants". It is recorded as a settlement of 43 households in the hundred of Depwade, with manors divided between the estates of William the Conqueror, Alan of Brittany, William de Warenne, Roger Bigod and Eudo, son of Spirewic. The village had two churches at this time, one of which is likely to have been on the site of the current parish church. The location of the other church is unknown.

Rode was added to the parish name at some point during the medieval period, possibly in the 14th century when Robert de Rode held land in the parish. During this period the deer park associated with Buckenham Castle extended as far as the western boundary of the parish.

Carleton Rode was the site of a semaphore telegraph station which connected the Admiralty in London to the fleet in Great Yarmouth.

In 1960, an Orlit Post was constructed for the Royal Observer Corps which remained in use until 1968, when it was abandoned.

== Amenities ==
Carleton Rode Primary School is a Church of England school located within the village.

The GP2 Series racing team, iSport International has its factory and headquarters in Carleton Rode.

== All Saints' Church ==
The remaining church in the parish dates to the 13th century is Grade I listed. It is dedicated to All Saints. The tower was partially rebuilt in 1717 after it had collapsed and the roof was rebuilt during the 19th century. Internally the church has a rood screen depicting twelve saints which dates from the 15th century.
