= Polymer Developments Group Ltd v Tilialo =

- Court: High Court of New Zealand
- Full case name: Polymer Developments Group Limited v Katuni Tilialo
- Decided: 30 April 2002
- Citation: [2002] 3 NZLR 258
- Transcript: http://www.ucc.ie/law/restitution/archive/newzcases/polymer.htm

Court membership
- Judge sitting: Glazebrook J

Keywords
- illegal contract, void contract

Polymer Developments Group Ltd v Tilialo [2002] 3 NZLR 258 is a New Zealand case regarding the legality of contracts created to prevent a prosecution, which unlike the earlier similar precedents of Mall Finance v Slater [1976] 2 NZLR 685 and Barsdell v Kerr [1979] 2 NZLR 731, in this case however, although the contract was clearly illegal, relief was granted to the creditor.

== Background ==
Ena Poloa worked for Polymer Developments. After an internal investigation, it was revealed that Mr Poloa had misappropriated $374,000 from the company, which he later blamed on his gambling addiction.

Poloa's brother, Katuni Tilialo, concerned that his brother would be convicted and sent to prison, contacted Polymer, offering to repay the misappropriated monies, with the inference that should he do so, that they would not get the police involved.

Through his lawyers, Polymer accepted his repayment arrangement on his 3rd draft, and on 20 November 2000, the parties signed a Deed of Acknowledgement with the important clause of:

In consideration of payments made and received by PDG [Polymer], PDG agree not to commence any legal proceedings whatsoever either criminal or civil for the outstanding amount against Ena Poloa.

The deed required Mr Tilialo to immediately pay $60,000, plus $15,000 every 6 months thereafter, which he paid the $60,000 plus one of the $15,000 instalments. Technically he paid the 2nd instalment as well, but in an unwise move he gave that $15,000 to his brother (the one with the gambling problem) to pass on to Polymer, which unfortunately (and not very surprising) he lost gambling.

After Mr Tilialo made no further payments, Polymer sued him in court for the balance left owing under the deed, which Tilialo defended on the grounds that it was an illegal contract, and so is not legally enforceable. Tilialo also sought the court to order Polymer to refund the monies he had already paid.

== Held ==
Polymer argued that the agreement was merely to stop them commencing a private prosecution (they claimed the reference to "criminal" in the agreement was an oversight) and not a police prosecution, and so was not against public policy of hindering justice.

However the judge saw little legal distinction between a private and a public prosecution where Glazebrook J said:

There is much force in Cooke J's remarks in Mall Finance v. Slater (supra) to the effect that there may be less reason to make such distinctions given the existence of the relief provisions in the Illegal Contracts Act. The balancing of freedom to contract and the strength or otherwise of the public policy considerations in these cases can be done at the time of a decision about relief under s 7 of the Illegal Contracts Act 1970.

The judge had little problem in setting aside the deed as void and as of no effect. Both parties however had sought relief from the court under the Illegal Contracts Act [1970], with Polymer seeking to keep the $75,000 already paid as well as payment of the remaining instalments, and Tilialo sought the return of the monies already paid.

The judge ordered validation and variation of the deed, validation of the $75,000 already paid, meaning Polymer did not have to refund this, and granted relief to Tilialo in that he only needed to make 3 further instalments of $15,000, plus a final payment of $5,000.

Whilst courts rarely grant such relief in such cases, the judge, in deciding to make Mr Tilialo to pay something under such an agreement, took into account the important aspects here that firstly it was Mr Tilialo was the one whom first offered to pay (and not Polymer), that Mr Tilialo employed solicitors to negotiate the deed, so arguably he had proper legal advice, furthermore Mr Tilialo was also a person who was very used to legal documentation and to consulting solicitors in the course of his work and that Polymer signed the deed in the form presented under pressure from Mr Tilialo to do so at a meeting where Polymers Managing Director was unavailable and when Mr Tilialo would have been aware of that fact.
