= Mall Finance & Investment Co Ltd v Slater =

- Court: Court of Appeal of New Zealand
- Full case name: Mall Finance & Investment Company Limited v GizelleSlater
- Decided: 10 August 1976
- Citation: [1976] 2 NZLR 685

Court membership
- Judges sitting: Richmond P, Woodhouse J, Cooke J

Keywords
- public policy, illegal contracts

Mall Finance & Investment Co Ltd v Slater [1976] 2 NZLR 685, is a New Zealand case regarding whether a contract entered into to stop a party for filing criminal charge is legally enforceable or not. It is more often cited as Slater v Mall Finance.

== Background ==
Gizelle Slater's de facto husband Gary Nausbaum was a director at Mall Finance. After he misappropriated $11,500 from Mall Finance, Slater entered into an agreement with the company to repay the stolen money, if the company agreed not to report the matter to the police. To secure the agreement, Slater had to give a mortgage over her house at 60 Penrose Street, Lower Hutt.

Later, Slater had a change of heart (and perhaps a change of boyfriend) and applied to the High Court to set aside the mortgage because it was illegal at common law, being it was a contract entered into for the purpose of not to disclose a crime.

The High Court set aside the mortgage, as section 7(3) of the Illegal Contracts Act prohibits the courts from granting any such relief to Mall Finance. Mall Finance appealed.

== Decision ==
The Court of Appeal reversed the High Court's ruling, but on the technicality that the High Court should have referred the matter to a full hearing. However the end effect is that any contract obtained to prevent someone not to report a criminal act, will not be legally enforceable.
