= John Knyvet =

English judge

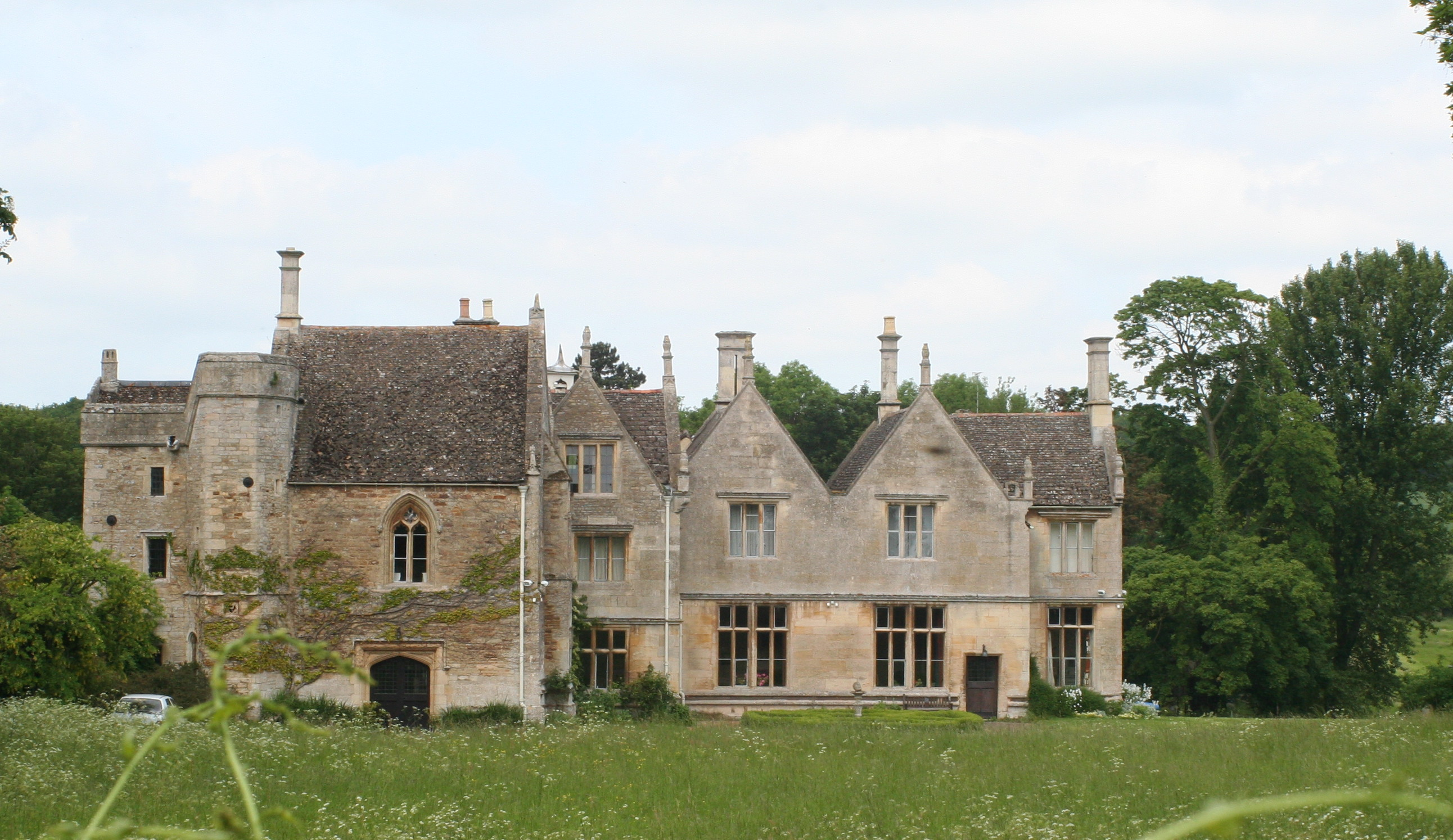
Southwick Hall

Sir John Knyvet (died 16 February 1381) was an English lawyer and administrator. He was Chief Justice of the King's Bench from 1365 to 1372, and Lord Chancellor of England from 1372 to 1377.

== Life ==
Knyvett was eldest son of Richard Knyvet of Southwick, Northamptonshire, and a keeper of Rockingham Forest. His mother was Joanna, a daughter and the heiress of John Wurth. He married Eleanor, daughter of Ralph, Lord Basset of Weldon, and they had four sons and a daughter. He owned and improved Southwick Manor, which he inherited from his father; the house still survives today.

Knyvet was practicing in the courts as early as 1347; in 1354 he was a Serjeant-at-law, and on 24 June 1361 was appointed a justice of the Court of Common Pleas. On 29 October 1365 he was appointed Chief Justice of the King's bench. In 1362, he served as a "trier of petitions" for Aquitaine and other lands overseas for Parliament. In future years until 1380, he continued to perform as trier for England, Scotland, Wales, and Ireland, except while he was Chancellor.

On 30 June 1372, after the death of Robert Thorpe, Knyvet was appointed chancellor. He held the office until 11 January 1377 when Adam Houghton was appointed.

Knyvet did not again hold judicial office, though he was appointed with the two chief justices to decide a question between the Earl of Pembroke and William la Zouch of Haryngworth. He was part of the king's council. He was an executor of the will of Edward III.

After the death of King Edward III, served on the first council of Richard II's reign until October 1377.

Knyvet died on 16 February 1381.

== Family ==
Knyvet held large estates both in Northamptonshire and East Anglia, his descendants established themselves as an important family in Norfolk. His children included:

- John Knyvet (c. 1359–1418) of Southwick and Mendlesham. He became M.P. for Huntingdonshire, and married Joan Botetort.
- Robert Knyvet (d. 1419), of Rayleigh, Essex.
- Richard Knyvet
- Henry Knyvet
- Ralph Knyvet
- Margery Knyvet

== See also ==
- List of lord chancellors and lord keepers

Legal offices
| Preceded by Henry Green | Lord Chief Justice; 1365–1372 | Succeeded by John Cavendish |
Political offices
| Preceded by Sir Robert Thorpe | Lord Chancellor; 1372–1377 | Succeeded by Adam Houghton |
