= Henry Colet =

Lord Mayor of London 1486 - 1495

Sir Henry Colet (died 1505) was twice Lord Mayor of London.

== Life ==
He was the third son of Robert Colet of Wendover, Buckinghamshire. He came to London in youth; he was apprenticed to a mercer, and soon became one of the wealthiest members of the Mercers' Company. He was elected alderman of Farringdon ward without 15 November 1476, and Sheriff of London on 21 June 1477. He became alderman of Castle Baynard, in exchange for Farringdon ward, 1 February 1483–4, and was removed to Cornhill ward on 7 March 1487–8.

He was chosen mayor for the first time on 13 October 1486. During his mayoralty, he rebuilt at his own expense the cross in West Cheap, and when Henry VII married Elizabeth of York (13 January 1486–7), Colet was knighted. According to the churchwardens' accounts of the parish of St. Michael, Cornhill, he was granted a release from serving the office of mayor for the second time, 20 July 1495, but he was nevertheless re-elected 13 October following, and did not decline the honour. he was also elected Member of Parliament for the City of London in 1487 and 1489.

He and his wife, Dame Christian Colet, begot 22 children, one of whom, John Colet was an English Humanist who founded St Paul's School, London, in 1509. He purchased an estate and a fine house at Stepney, and there he died in 1505, being buried in Stepney Church, of which his son John was at one time vicar.

His London residence was situated in the parish of St. Antholin, and Stow states that a painted window containing portraits of himself and his family was erected to his memory in St. Antholin's Church, to which Colet was a great benefactor. His tomb at Stepney was twice repaired by the Mercers' Company, in 1605 and 1697.

== See also ==
- List of Sheriffs of the City of London
- List of Lord Mayors of London
- City of London (elections to the Parliament of England)

== Sources ==
- Sutton, Anne F. "Colet, Sir Henry (c.1430–1505)". Oxford Dictionary of National Biography (online ed.). Oxford University Press. doi:10.1093/ref:odnb/5897. (Subscription, Wikipedia Library access or UK public library membership required.)
