= Buckenham Castle =

Grade I listed castle in Norfolk, England

- Old Buckenham and New Buckenham, Norfolk
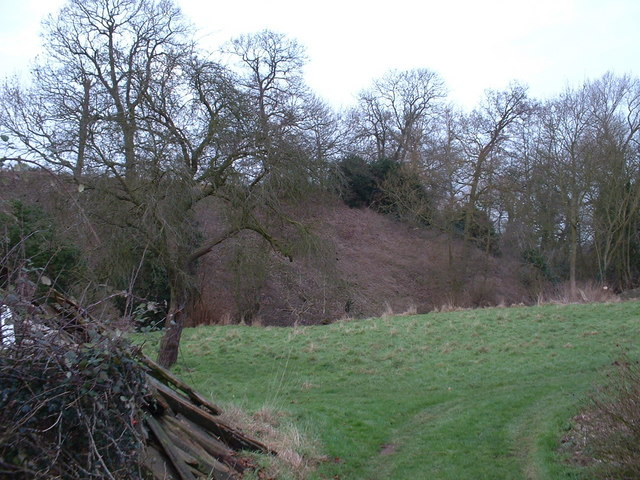
- Earthworks at New Buckenham

Site information
- Condition: Earthworks survive

Location
- Shown within Norfolk
- Location within Norfolk
- Coordinates: 52.471859°N 1.067253°E
- Grid reference: grid reference TM08429041

Old Buckenham Castle and Buckenham Castle are two castles adjacent respectively to the villages of Old Buckenham and New Buckenham, Norfolk, England.

== Old Buckenham Castle ==
All that remains today of what was a Norman castle are the remnants of the earthworks and some traces of a stone curtain wall. The castle was built by William d'Aubigny, a follower of William the Conqueror.

After the castle was moved to the new site a priory (Old Buckenham Priory) was established on the site thus destroying many of the earlier remains.

== Buckenham Castle ==
In the early part of the reign of King Stephen a new castle was built two miles to the south east of the site of the old castle by the Aubigny family. Today the remaining foundations of a circular stone keep are still visible - this is approximately 60 feet in diameter. The castle was besieged during the Barons' War in 1263. In 1316 Buckenham Castle was inherited by Adam de Clifton (d. 1366), son of Roger de Clifton (d. 1316). The last in the male line was John Clifton (d. 1447) whose sister and eventual heiress Elizabeth Clifton married John Knyvett, and thus Buckenham Castle passed to her Knyvett descendants. The fortress was finally demolished in 1649 by Philip Knyvett, 1st Baronet, leaving just the moat and the earth ramparts.

The Knyvett family had moved here from their earlier seat at Southwick, Northamptonshire. By 1465 John Knyvet occupied the castle. That year his daughter, Christiana, married Henry Colet, later Lord Mayor of London.

The castle comprised an inner bailey and two outer baileys, all with earth walls. The circular keep is thought to be the earliest in England. Its walls are 11 feet thick at their base and it is thought that the height of the keep in its heyday could have been as much as 40 feet.

To service the castle and garrison, the planned settlement of New Buckenham was established and today the village covers much the same area and grid layout as the original. Despite being adjacent to the village of New Buckenham, the ruins of the castle, the earthworks, the St Mary's chapel/barn and most of the surrounding meadows/scheduled land are in the parish of Old Buckenham. This site is a Grade I Listed building and a Scheduled Monument.

The castle is private property and access can be sought at the village shop on King Street in New Buckenham.

== See also ==
- Castles in Great Britain and Ireland
- List of castles in England
