= Southwick, Northamptonshire =

Village in Northamptonshire, England

Coordinates: 52.5152°N 0.498°W

Southwick
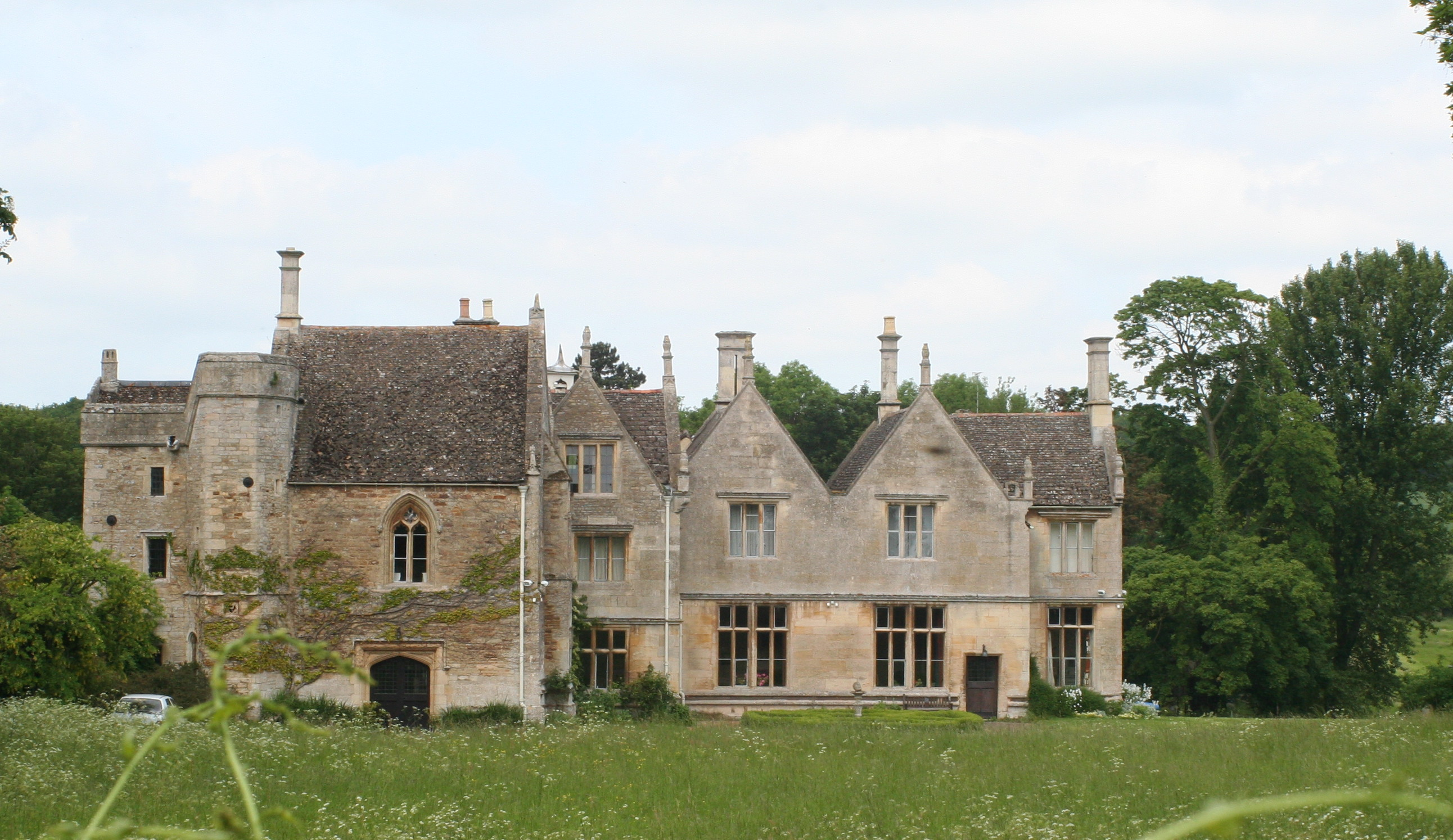
- Southwick Hall

- Location within Northamptonshire
- Population: 181 (2011)
- OS grid reference: SP921021
- Unitary authority: North Northamptonshire
- Ceremonial county: Northamptonshire
- Region: East Midlands
- Country: England
- Sovereign state: United Kingdom
- Post town: Peterborough
- Postcode district: PE8
- Dialling code: 01832
- Police: Northamptonshire
- Fire: Northamptonshire
- Ambulance: East Midlands
- UK Parliament: Corby and East Northamptonshire

Southwick (pronounced "Suth-ick") is a small village and civil parish in Northamptonshire, England. It is approximately 3 miles (4.8 km) north of the town of Oundle and is set in a valley of the River Nene. The village lies in the North Northamptonshire. Before local government changes in 2021 it fell within the non-metropolitan district of East Northamptonshire, which lay within the East Midlands region. At the time of the 2001 census, the parish's population was 180 people, increasing marginally to 181 at the 2011 Census.

== History ==
The village's name means 'Southern specialised farm'.

Excavations were carried out at Southwick in 1996 and the results were published in a paper in Northamptonshire Archaeology. Excavations of two closely connected sites produced evidence of thriving iron-smelting industry in the village in the 10th century. A medieval stone hall dating from the mid-13th century, which may have been a manse owned by St Mary's Priory, Huntingdon, was subsequently converted into a kitchen and brewhouse before being relegated to use as an outbuilding for the 16th century Vicarage Farm. In the north-west of Southwick parish there is a chalybeate spring; during the 17th century its medicinal properties were recognised and bathing facilities were constructed.

=== The manor of Southwick, and Southwick Hall ===
The first mention of a Knyvett at Southwick is in 1194. The Knyvetts were in the village for at least a century before they built the present house. Richard Knyvett, a prominent wool merchant, was the keeper of the forest of Clive (or Cliffe) which is now part of Rockingham Forest, from 1324. The family built the medieval manor house which was then known as Knyvett's Place but is now known as Southwick Hall. Dating from this period are two towers, one at the front of the house and the other in the courtyard at the rear.

Richard Knyvett's son, Sir John Knyvet, was Chief Justice of the King's Bench and Lord Chancellor between 1372 and 1377. Another family member was the Member of Parliament for Huntingdonshire and another was the Sheriff of Northamptonshire who was taken prisoner whilst fighting in the Hundred Years' War: a ransom of a thousand pounds was demanded for his release.

The Knyvetts allowed Southwick to pass to the Lynn family after inheriting a better seat for themselves at Buckenham Castle in Norfolk. The first Lynn at Southwick was John Lynn, who married Joan Knyvett, a descendant of the John Knyvet established there in 1194.

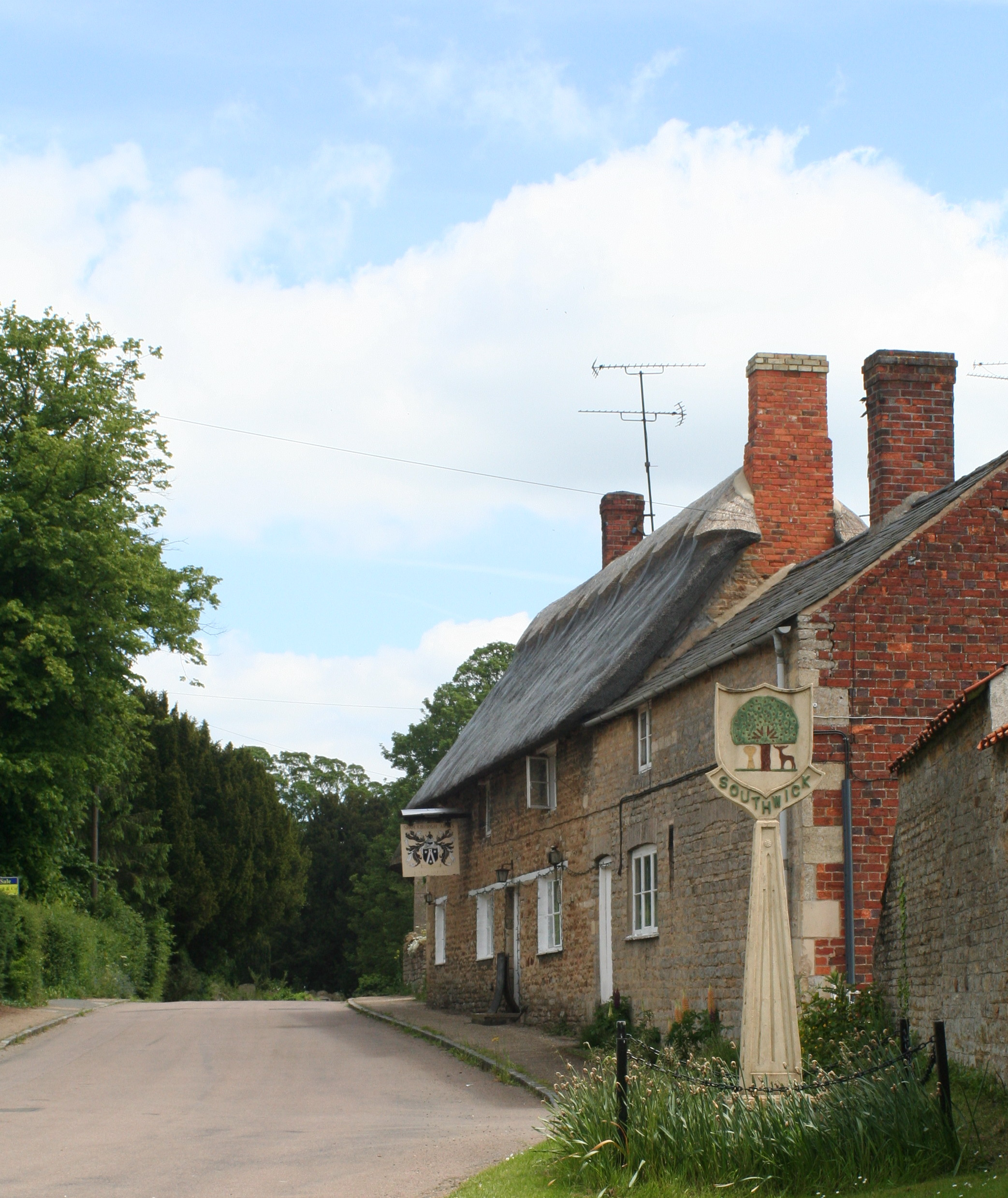
The Shuckburgh Arms

The Lynn family held the manor of Southwick from 1442 until 1840, and it was during their tenure that most of Southwick Hall was built, although the oldest parts date from the 14th century. The family ended in an heiress, Martha Lynn or Lynne, who married but died childless in 1796. Her heirs were the Johnson family, who took the name and arms of Lynn but sold Southwick to the Capron family in 1840.

The Caprons were already lords of the nearby manor of Stoke Doyle, and the first Capron lord of the manor of Southwick, George Capron (1783-1872), had made a fortune as a lawyer at the time of the railway boom of the early 19th century, in which he acted for railway companies in acquisitions of land.

A connection is traced between the three families which have owned the manor of Southwick from the 12th to the 21st centuries: Knyvett, Lynn and Capron. One of George Capron's great-uncles was John Shuckburgh, or Shukburgh. His mother, Judith Thynne, was descended through the Thynnes of Longleat (now Marquesses of Bath) from the Lynn family. John Shukburgh's only son, Rev. John Shukburgh, left George Capron the residue of his estate when he died unmarried in 1818. George's uncle John was a co-heir, but in 1839 he also died unmarried, leaving the Caprons as sole heirs in residue. It was in the following year that the Caprons acquired the manor of Southwick. The pub in Southwick is called the Shuckburgh Arms because of this connection.

The Caprons rebuilt and enlarged the east wing of Southwick in 1870. According to the Return of Owners of Land, 1873 the Capron estates centred on Southwick Hall and Stoke Doyle comprised over 5,000 acres (20 km^{2}), including woodland and generated an income of over £4,000 a year. These have now been much reduced, but the Capron family remain as lords of the manors and members of the family are in residence at Southwick Hall.

== Landmarks ==
=== Parish church ===
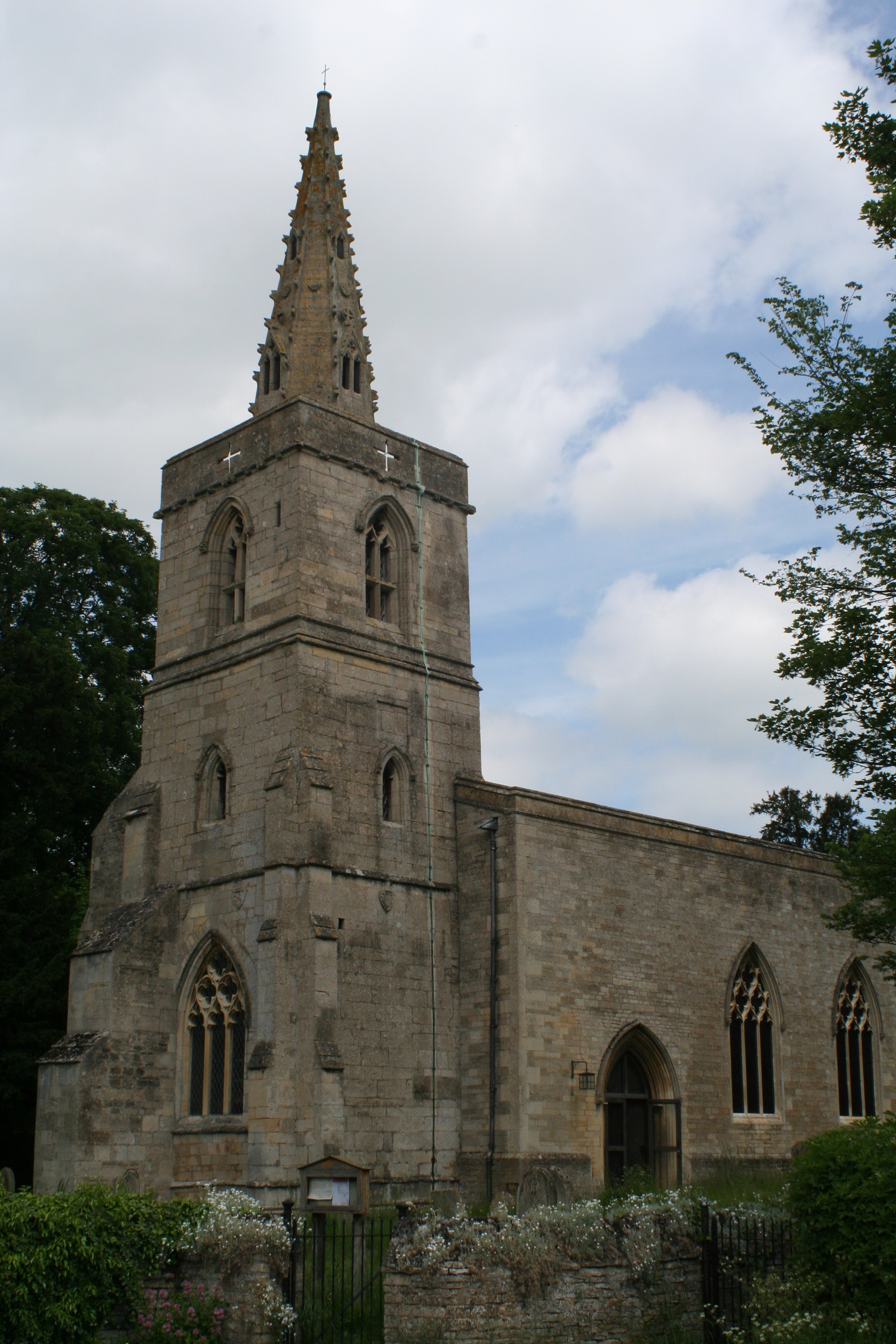
St Mary's church

The village church, which is adjacent to the Hall, is dedicated to St Mary. The church was built by the Knyvett family in around 1230 and has a 14th-century west tower. Parts of the church were modernised in Victorian times. The church had a cup dating to around 1570, a 17th-century cover platen and a flagon dating to circa 1667.

Inside the church is a monument to George Lynn by Louis-François Roubiliac and which dates to 1758; it was commissioned by Ann Bellamy Lynn (at a cost of £500) and shows her looking up at a profile of her late husband. The modern cross and candlesticks used in the church were made from the wood of a tree which had grown in the churchyard and were a thanks offering from Edith Capron following recovery from a severe illness in 1931. The altar rails date from the 18th century; beneath them lie the tombs of John (died 1694) and Grace Lynn (died 1694) and her father, "That learned and pious Anthony Cade", who had been a tutor and chaplain to the Duke of Buckingham.

Other features in the church include:

- The wooden panelling now found in the sanctuary was originally from Southwick Hall.
- The pulpit is of panelled oak and is possibly a part of a three-decker pulpit installed in the church in 1905.
- A discoid of a 13th- or 14th-century grave marker.
- The old oak headstock of the church's medieval tenor bell which was cast and hung by Thomas Newcombe of Leicester. Before its replacement in 1967, it had given the church 400 years of use.

The churchyard was built on land that had earlier been used by the Romans to extract the local ironstone. Due to later settling of the infilled quarry, the church has required heavy buttressing on the tower and also the rebuilding of the nave and the chancel.

==== Gallery ====
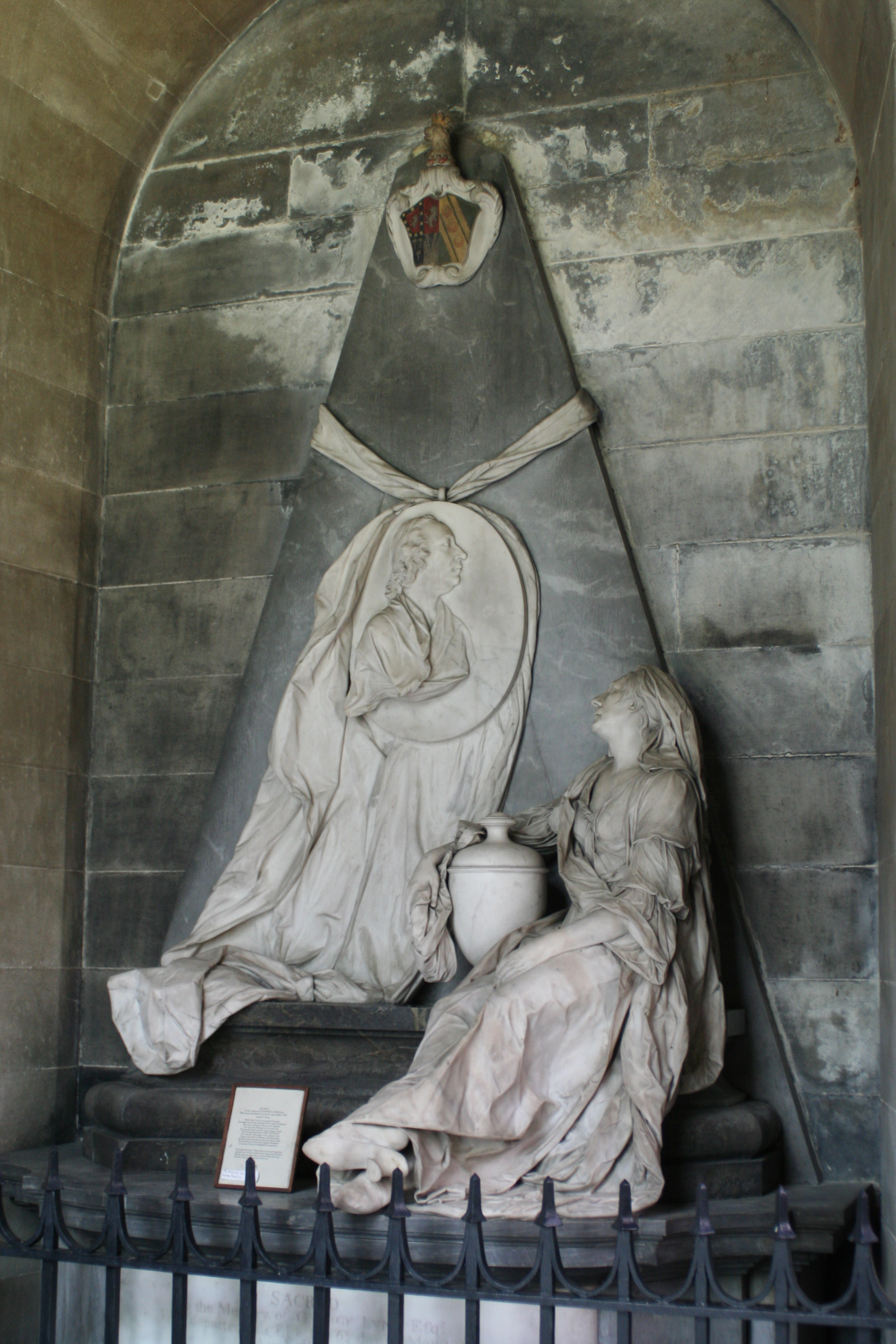
Memorial to George Lynn by Louis-François Roubiliac

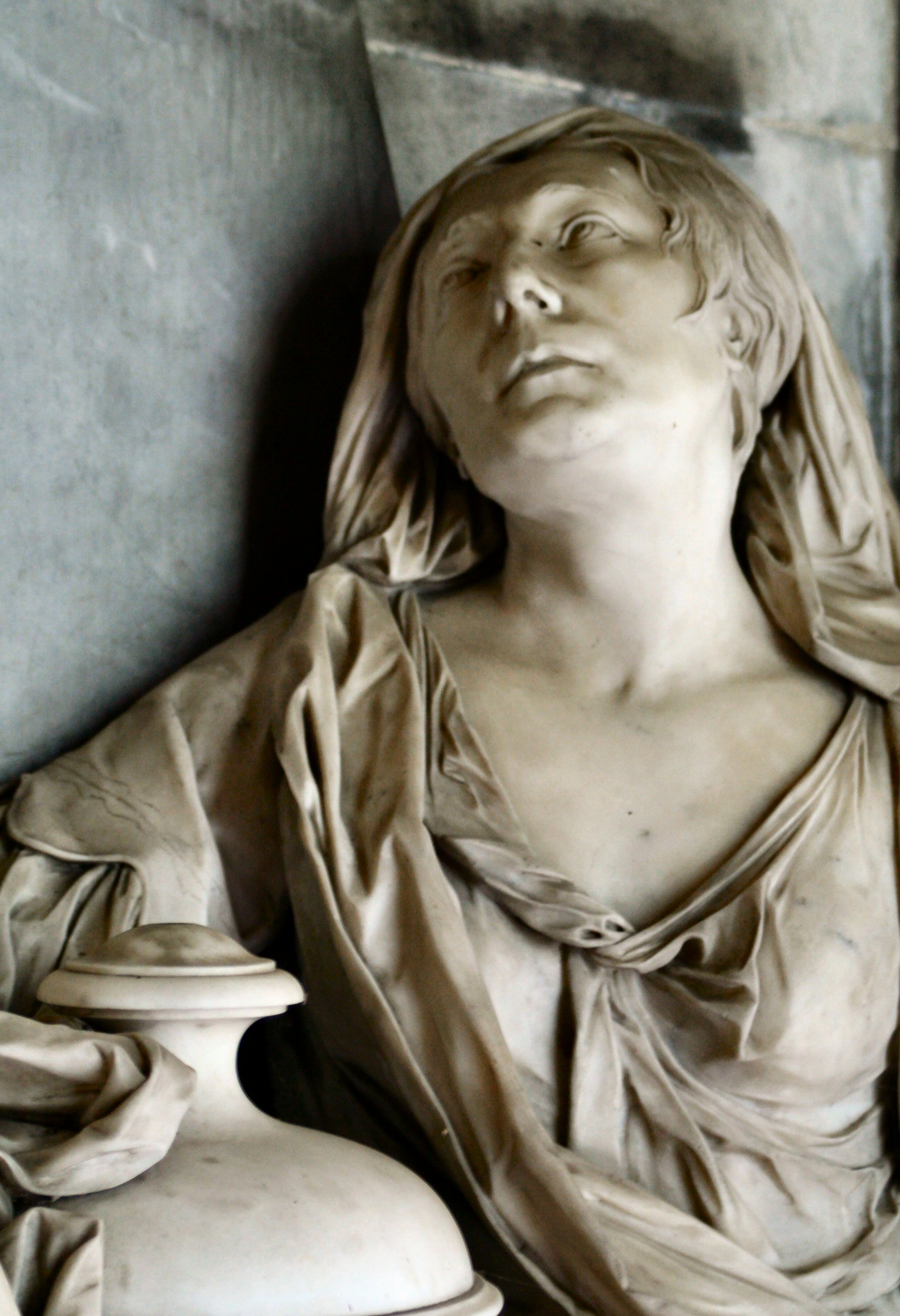
A detail of the Lynn memorial

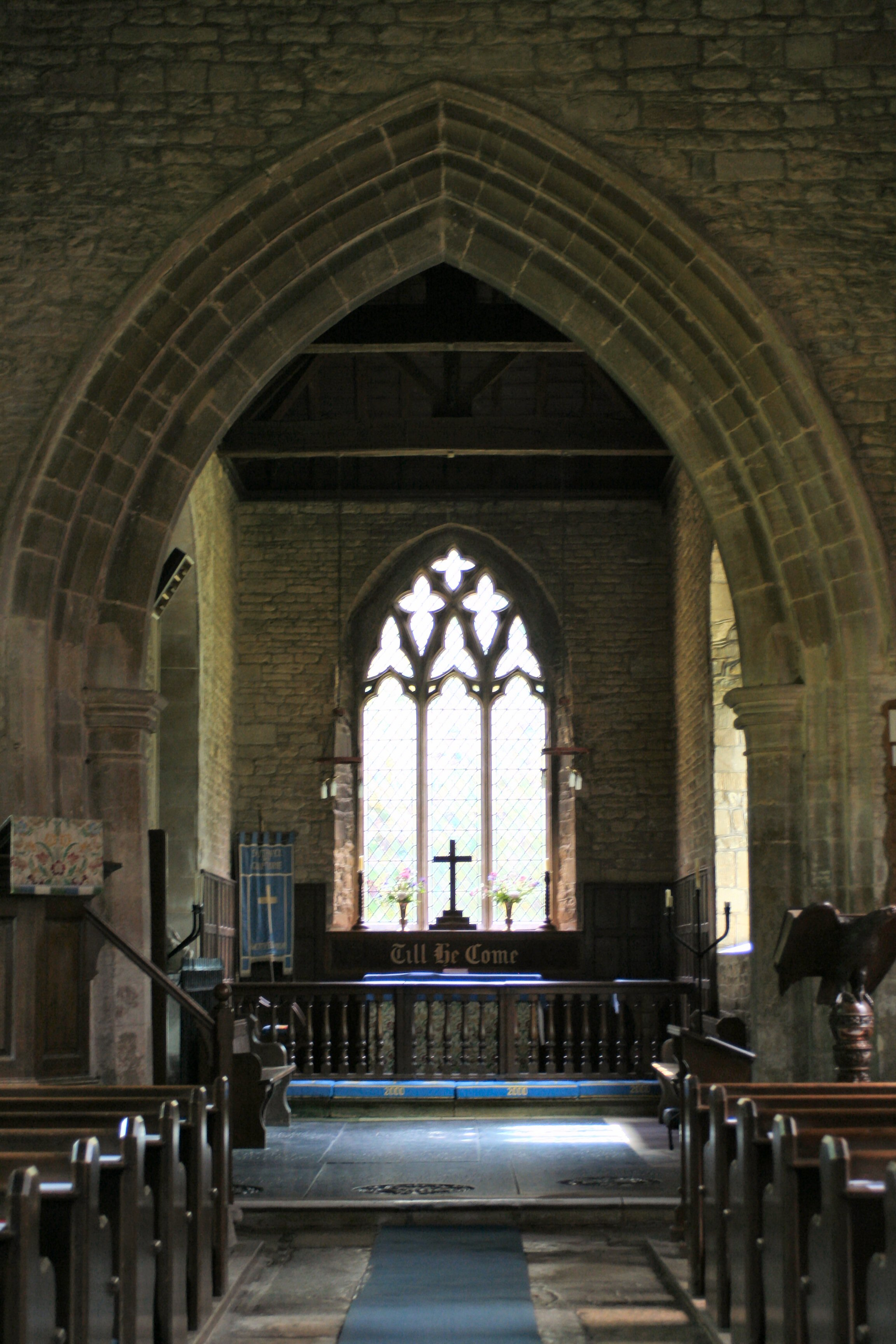
Inside St Mary's

=== Southwick Wood ===
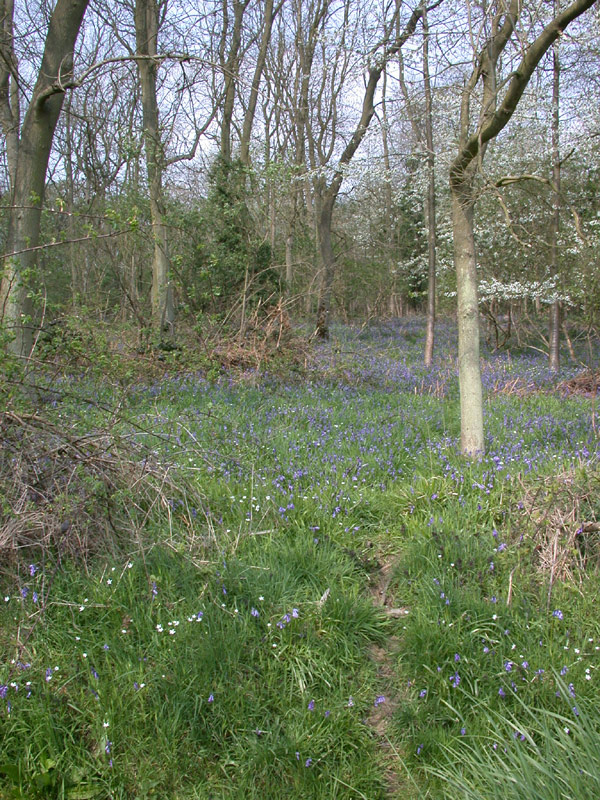
Southwick Wood

Southwick Wood is now a nature reserve managed by the Wildlife Trust for Bedfordshire, Cambridgeshire and Northamptonshire. It has an area of 56 acres (230,000 m^{2}). Many suckering elms were lost to Dutch elm disease in the late 1960s, and have been replaced by Wild Cherry. Other trees include Ash, Oak and Field Maple, together with Wild Service Trees no longer producing viable seed, which is an indicator of antiquity of woodland. Greater Butterfly Orchid has been recorded here in the past.

== Amenities ==
The village pub is the Shuckburgh Arms and is thought to date from the 16th century. The pub was brought into the estate by the owner George Capron in about 1839. He named it after his cousin the Rev. J. Shuckburgh.
