= John Knyvet (died 1445) =

English politician

Sir John Knyvet (c. 1395 – 9 November 1445), of Southwick, Northamptonshire, Hamerton, Huntingdonshire and Mendlesham, Suffolk, was an English politician.

== Life ==
Knyvet was the son and heir of John Knyvet by his first wife Joan Boutetout. He was born around 1395, as his age was around 24 when his father died in December 1418.

By 1412, Knyvet had married Elizabeth, daughter of Constantine, Baron Clifton and wife Margaret, sister of John Howard. Elizabeth was the heiress of her brother John Clifton, who died in 1447 without legitimate heirs.

Knyvet had been knighted by December 1418. In December 1421, he served as a Member of Parliament (MP) for Northamptonshire. He was Sheriff of Northamptonshire from 7 November 1427 to 4 November 1428.

Knyvet died on 9 November 1445.

Knyvet's ancestral home of Southwick was inherited by his daughter, Joan, and her husband, John Lynne. His son and heir, John, inherited the rest of his property.
