= Stoughton =

Stoughton may refer to:

== Places ==
in the United States of America:

- Stoughton, Massachusetts
  - Stoughton station
- Stoughton, Wisconsin
- Stoughton Hall, building at Harvard University

in England:

- Stoughton, Leicestershire
  - Stoughton Grange
- Stoughton, Surrey
- Stoughton, West Sussex
- Stoulton settlement, Worcestershire

in Canada:

- Stoughton, Saskatchewan

== People ==
- Adrian Stoughton, English politician
- Blaine Stoughton, Canadian ice hockey player
- Cecil W. Stoughton, American photographer
- Charence Charles Stoughton, former president of Wittenberg University
- Charles B. Stoughton, Union officer during the American Civil War
- David Stoughton, American musician
- David Stoughton Conant, American botanist
- Diana Stoughton, American set decorator
- Edwin Stoughton, several people with that name
- Francis Stoughton Sullivan, Irish lawyer and academic
- George Stoughton, English politician
- Henry E. Stoughton, American politician
- Israel Stoughton, early American colonist
- Jeff Stoughton, Canadian curler
- John Stoughton (disambiguation), several people with that name
- Laurence Stoughton, English politician
- Luke Stoughton, English cricketer
- Margaret Stoughton Abell, American forester
- Nicholas Stoughton, English politician
- Thomas Stoughton, English politician
- William Stoughton, several people with that name

== Other ==
- Hodder & Stoughton, English publishing house
- Stoughton & Stoughton, American architectural firm
- Stoughton baronets, English peerage title
