= Henry Rose (MP) =

English politician

Henry Rose (fl. 1406) was an English politician.

He was a member (MP) of the parliament of England for Guildford in 1406. Nothing further than this information is recorded of him.

Parliament of England
Preceded by John Gatyn; Thomas Brocas	Member of Parliament for Guildford; 1406; With: William Gregory	Succeeded by Robert Hull; John Wharton
