= William Waterman (MP) =

English politician

William Waterman (fl. 1414) was an English politician.

Waterman was a Member of the Parliament of England for Guildford in November 1414. Beyond this, nothing is recorded of him.

Parliament of England
Preceded by ? ?	Member of Parliament for Guildford; 1414; With: Geoffrey Mudge	Succeeded by Thomas Ingram; William Weston
