= Robert Parkhurst =

Robert Parkhurst may refer to:

- Robert Parkhurst (Lord Mayor) (1569–1636), English merchant who was Lord Mayor of London
- Robert Parkhurst (died 1674), English politician who sat in the House of Commons in 1659
- Robert Parkhurst (died 1651) (1603–1651), English politician who sat in the House of Commons between 1625 and 1651
