= Sir John Jarvis, 1st Baronet =

British industrialist, politician and philanthropist (1876 – 1950)

Sir (Joseph) John Jarvis, 1st Baronet (25 March 1876 – 3 October 1950) was a British industrialist and philanthropist who became a Conservative Party politician. He sat in the House of Commons from 1935 to 1950 as the Member of Parliament (MP) for Guildford in Surrey, but is best known for his philanthropic and industrial efforts to assist the town of Jarrow in the economic depression of the 1930s.

== Early life and family ==
Jarvis was the eldest son of Joseph Charles Jarvis, of Harpenden. In 1901 he married Bessie Woodfield, the third daughter of Edwin Woodfield from Enfield. They had two sons and two daughters. John Jarvis received his secondary education at The Grocers' Company's School in Hackney.

== Residence ==
From 1921 until his death, Jarvis lived at Hascombe Court in Surrey, 500 m west of the village of Hascombe, 5 km south of Godalming. The garden was designed under Jarvis's ownership by Gertrude Jekyll in 1922, and extended by Percy Cane in 1928.

== Career ==
During World War I, Jarvis was an advisor to government on labour relations, and after the war the government continued to seek his advice on financial matters. In recognition of these services, he was created a Baronet in 1922, of Hascombe Court in the County of Surrey, in 1922.

=== Jarrow ===
In early 1934 he was elected as High Sheriff of Surrey, and shortly afterwards visited Jarrow, a shipbuilding town on Tyneside which had been particularly badly hit by the Great Depression. The Depression caused a collapse in demand for ships, and the closure of Palmers shipyard in Jarrow, leading to 80% unemployment in the town. Jarvis launched an appeal named the "Surrey Fund" which eventually raised £40,000; the funds were used to buy materials to enable men in Jarrow to continue working, on tasks such as the constructing playgrounds and sports facilities and the redecoration of houses. Using his own wealth, Jarvis also bought the decommissioned liner Olympic (a sistership of the Titanic) for a reported £100,000 and had the ship brought to Tyneside to be broken up, followed in 1938 by the liner Berengaria. The breaking of Berengaria was promised to directly employ 200 men in skilled and semi-skilled tasks in the new Jarrow Shipbreaking Company (based on the former Palmers shipyard), while the metal was to be used in Jarvis's new metal industries in the area, which employed several hundred people. Through Jarvis's efforts, several other new businesses were established in the Jarrow area. Jarvis also brought unemployed miners from Jarrow to Hascombe Court, his country estate in Surrey, where they built a Japanese style water and rock garden.

Set against the scale of the economic problems in Jarrow, the impact of Jarvis's efforts is contested. In a letter published in The Times on 2 October 1936, Jarvis listed some of the achievements of the fund as a "step in the right direction". However, on the following day Jarrow MP Ellen Wilkinson praised Jarvis's support for the town but criticised "his over-sanguine optimism", noting that the employment generated had been small-scale and temporary. Wilkinson complained that charitable works were inadequate, and that a solution to the problem required addressing the underlying cause, which was the forced closure of the shipyard.

For his efforts, Jarvis was made a freeman of Jarrow in 1935, but the ceremony on 4 June was boycotted by Labour Party councillors because Jarvis had been selected as a Conservative candidate for the coming general election.

=== Parliament ===
Guildford's Conservative MP Charles Rhys announced in January 1934 that he would not contest the next election. At a meeting of the Central Council of the Guildford Division Conservative and Unionist Association on 25 February, Jarvis was invited to be the National Conservative candidate at the next election, and it was reported on 9 March that he had accepted.

However, the parties in the National Government had agreed not to oppose each other at elections, so a question arose as to whether the National Government-supporting candidate for the forthcoming vacancy in Guildford should be a Conservative or a Liberal. S. Stopford Brooke, who had contested Guildford for the Liberal Party at the 1929 general election, had stood aside in favour of the Conservatives at the by-election in August 1931 and at the general election later that year. Brooke announced in February that he had resigned from the Liberal Party, and intended this time to stand as National candidate "without prefix or suffix". He was supported by local representatives the Liberal, Conservative and National Labour parties.

However, in August 1935, Brooke's candidacy was halted by the local National association, which announced that since the collaboration of parties in the constituencies had not developed across the country at large, "no useful purpose would be served by running a purely National candidate in this division in support of this principle".

At the general election in November 1935, Brooke signed Jarvis's nomination papers. The only other candidate was Andrew Campbell of the Labour Party, who was a stranger to the constituency and had a weak local organisation. Jarvis was elected with nearly 75% of the votes, and was made a Deputy Lieutenant of Surrey in 1936. He was re-elected in 1945, and held the seat until he stood down from the House of Commons at the 1950 general election.

In November 1943 he wrote to The Times newspaper to summarise his experiences in Jarrow, asserting that it was better to bring work to people in depressed areas than to encourage them to move in search of work.

== Death and legacy ==
Jarvis died on 2 October 1950, aged 74.

In September 1951 a plaque was placed in Jarrow Town Hall commemorating Sir John and the Surrey Fund in connection with the installation of a chiming clock. It reads:

This plaque was provided by the citizens of Jarrow to commemorate the kindness of the people of Surrey, who subscribed to the "SURREY FUND" raised at the request of Sir JOHN JARVIS, Baronet, to assist Jarrow during the period of abnormal unemployment. The fund was used to brighten the homes of the people of Jarrow, to construct the Monkton Dene Park and in the year of the FESTIVAL of BRITAIN, 1951, to provide a chiming clock for the town hall and a Shelter near the "Festival Flats" in Monkton Road.

In 2018 a plaque was unveiled in his memory at Monkton Stadium as part of Jarrow and Hebburn Athletics Club's 80th anniversary celebrations; Sir John had been involved in setting up the club in 1938.

In 2023 a plaque was placed on York Avenue, Jarrow, in honour of his support for the town during the Great Depression. The Blue Plaque was funded by the Jarvis family and the Jarrow and Hebburn Athletic Club

Parliament of the United Kingdom
Preceded by Charles Rhys	Member of Parliament for Guildford; 1935 – 1950	Succeeded by George Nugent
Baronetage of the United Kingdom
New creation	Baronet (of Hascombe Park, Surrey); 1922–1950	Succeeded by Arnold Adrian Jarvis
