= Ross Donnelly Mangles =

English politician

Ross Donnelly Mangles (1801 – 1877) was an English politician, Member of Parliament for Guildford between 1841 and 1857. In the latter year he became Chairman of the East India Company.

== Career and appointments ==
He was the son of James Mangles of Guildford and his wife Mary, and was educated at Eton College and East India College, Haileybury. He then joined the Bengal Civil Service.

Secretary to the Government of Bengal in the Judicial and Revenue Departments.

Deputy Lieutenant of London.

A director of the New Zealand Co.

Member of the Council of India in September 1858 to 1866

== Publications ==
- A brief vindication of the Honourable East India Company's government of Bengal, from the attacks of Messrs. Rickards & Crawfurd (1830)
- How To Colonize: The Interest Of The Country, And The Duty Of The Government (1842)
- The Mysore Reversion, An Exceptional Case
- Christian Reasons of a Member of the Church of England for Being a Reformer
- Notes on a Minute of Mr. R. D. Mangles in the Mysore Parliamentary Papers, no. 112 of 1866

== Family ==
Ross Lowis Mangles V.C. was his son.

Parliament of the United Kingdom
Preceded by James Yorke Scarlett	Member of Parliament for Guildford; 1841–1857; With: Charles Baring Wall 1832–1841; Henry Currie 1847–1852; James Bell 1852–1857; William Bovill 1857–1858	Succeeded by Guildford Onslow
