= Thomas Palmer =

Thomas or Tom Palmer may refer to:

== Politicians ==
- Thomas Palmer (Mayor of York) (c. 1219) on list of mayors of York
- Thomas Palmer, in 1433, MP for Leicestershire
- Thomas Palmer (MP for Rutland), in 1450, MP for Rutland
- Sir Thomas Palmer (courtier) (died 1553), soldier and courtier
- Sir Thomas Palmer (died 1544) (by 1498–1544), MP for Guildford 1529
- Thomas Palmer (died 1582), MP for Sussex, Guildford and Arundel
- Sir Thomas Palmer, 1st Baronet (1540–1626), "The Travailer"
- Thomas Palmer (1542–1616), MP for Sussex
- Thomas Palmer (died 1735), British member of parliament (MP) for Bridgewater
- Sir Thomas Palmer, 4th Baronet, of Wingham (1682–1723), MP for Kent 1708–1710 and for Rochester 1715–1724
- Sir Thomas Palmer, 4th Baronet, of Carlton (1702–1765), MP for Leicestershire 1754–1765
- Thomas W. Palmer (1830–1913), U.S. senator from the state of Michigan
- Thomas Palmer (Florida politician) (1859–1946), lawyer and politician in Florida

== Others ==
- Thomas Palmer (burgess), English immigrant to colonial Virginia
- Thomas Palmer (cyclist) (born 1990), Australian cyclist
- Thomas Fyshe Palmer (1747–1802), Unitarian minister and political reformer
- Tom Palmer (actor), American television actor particularly active in the 1960s, see "It Crawled Out of the Woodwork"
- Tom Palmer (animator), American animator
- Tom Palmer (business executive), Australian business executive
- Tom Palmer (comics) (1942–2022), comic book illustrator
- Tom Palmer (comedian), British comedian and actor
- Tom Palmer (American football) (1929–1980), American football player
- Tom Palmer (rugby union) (born 1979), English rugby player
- Tom G. Palmer (born 1956), libertarian commentator and fellow of the Cato Institute
- Tony Andruzzi (1925–1991), magician who sometimes performed as Tom Palmer
