= Thomas Waller =

Thomas Waller may refer to:

== Politics ==
- Thomas M. Waller (1840–1924), American politician, Democrat from Connecticut
- Thomas Waller (fl. 1421–1435), English politician, MP for Guildford
- Thomas Waller (died 1613) (c. 1569–1613), MP for Dover
- Thomas Wathen Waller, United Kingdom ambassador to Belgium (1845–1846)

== Science ==
- Thomas Richard Waller (born 1937), American malacologist and paleontologist

== Media ==
- Fats Waller (Thomas Waller, 1904–1943), American jazz pianist, organist, composer and comedic entertainer
- Tom Waller (born 1974), film producer and director
