= Ralph Wimbledon =

English politician

Ralph Wimbledon (fl. 1413) was an English politician.

== Family ==
He may have been the son of William Wimbledon, constable of Farnham Castle. His wife was named Isabel.

== Career ==
He was a Member of the Parliament of England for Guildford in May 1413.

Parliament of England
Preceded by ? ?	Member of Parliament for Guildford; 1413; With: Richard Eton	Succeeded by ? ?
