= James Mangles =

James Mangles may refer to:

- James Mangles (MP) (1762–1838), English merchant and politician
- James Mangles (Royal Navy officer) (1786–1867), explorer and botanist
