= Henry Colas =

Henry Colas may refer to:

- Henry Colas (fl. 1377), English MP
- Henry Colas (fl. 1393), English MP
