= James Spencer-Bell =

British politician

James Spencer-Bell (18 April 1818 – 22 February 1872), known until 1866 as James Bell, was a British Liberal Party politician. He was a member of parliament (MP) for Guildford from 1852 until 1857.

== Parental family ==
He was a son of John Bell (1774–1849) and Eliza Smith (died 1839), his wife. They were a Quaker family. John Bell (1774–1849) married Eliza Smith, daughter of Frederick and Sarah Smith. Her father was a Chemist (Pharmacist) of the Haymarket, London, to whom John Bell had been apprenticed. John Bell and his older sons successfully continued his father-in-law's business, moving it to Oxford Street.

== Marriage and name-change ==
On 6 June 1858, James Bell married Mary Ann Spencer, at the Friends Meeting House, Cockermouth. He is described as a Gentleman, the son of John Bell, Chemist. She is described as the daughter of Jeremiah Spencer of South Lodge, Cockermouth, Cumberland, yeoman.

On 29 January 1866, the couple received a Royal Licence to change their name to "Spencer-Bell", and to incorporate the Spencer coat of arms in theirs, according to the London Gazette

They had an address at 1, Devonshire Place, Marylebone and at Fawe Park, Keswick, Cumberland, a house designed for Spencer-Bell by Waterhouse.

== Architectural interests ==
James Bell trained as an architect but seems not to have practised in that profession, after the age of 30. He served as Honorary Secretary to the RIBA and received an obituary notice on his death:

I am unable to obtain particulars as to Mr. Bell's professional life. He was, fortunately for his own ease, in a position requiring little labour on his part, but he was attached to the profession he nominally followed and for some time showed his interest in it by acting as honorary secretary to the Institute. He was a pupil of Mr. Railton's but did not attempt to practise after the age of thirty. Mr Bell travelled much, and was indefatigable with his pencil. He represented the borough of Guildford for some time in Parliament. He took an active part in the committees of the House of Commons and was a diligent worker in several societies of a benevolent and religious character. He was in declining health for some time prior to his death, which occurred in February last, at the age of 52[sic - in fact 53].

The RIBA Library catalogue lists a number of his writings, including contributions to the programme of lectures preparing students for the Voluntary Examinations.

In 1866, he debated the proposals of Robert Kerr for the housing of the poor, under RIBA auspices.

== Political activity ==
James Bell, as he was then called, was elected as one of the two MPs for Guildford at the general election of 1852 along with R. D. Mangles (both Liberals), who had held the Guildford seat since 1841. After the 1852 election, there was a petition, alleging bribery and treating, which was found to be groundless and costs were awarded against the petitioner, in March 1853.

His maiden speech, on 8 March 1853, concerned objections to the proposed resiting of the National Gallery to Kensington.

In 1854, he spoke in the Commons on the building of the new Houses of Parliament and on the catalogue and collections policy of the British Museum. He spoke three times during the consideration of the Medical Graduates (University of London) Bill.

In 1855, he asked the Attorney General a question concerning the rival claims of the Duchy of Cornwall and the Commissioners of Woods and Forests to minerals below high-water mark. He spoke in the debate on the Victoria Government Bill, opposing its second reading. He questioned the cost of the contemplated new offices in Downing-street and Fludyer-street. He spoke concerning a proposed government building in Kensington Gore. He spoke on the Burials Bill.

In 1856, he spoke on the funding of the British Museum, hoping for evening opening. His last, brief contribution concerned irregularities in the procurement of a machine for perforating postage labels

At the General Election of 1857, Bell lost his seat to the Conservative Party candidate William Bovill. The Times suggested his vote on the China Question, against the Government appears to have given "general dissatisfaction among his constituents".

In 1870, he was a member of a delegation from the Society of Friends to Mr Gladstone and Mr W.E.Forster concerning Quaker views on the Elementary Education Bill.

James Bell's older brother Jacob was also a Liberal MP, sitting for St Albans from 1850 to 1852.

== Children ==
- Adelaide Eliza Spencer-Bell (13 September 1859 – 16 June 1922) married Samuel Middleton Fox.
- James Frederick Spencer-Bell, born 1863 at Alton in Hampshire, died 1886.
- Helen Johanna Spencer-Bell, b. 1865 in Marylebone, Middlesex, d. October 23, 1927 in Holloway, Amber Valley Borough, Derbyshire. In 1903 married Louis H. Shore Nightingale, first cousin once removed of Florence Nightingale.
- Juliet Spencer-Bell, born 9 July 1866, in London In 1892, married Colonel Edmond Herbert Grove-Hills, FRS
- Hubert John Spencer-Bell born 20 February 1869, in Marylebone, Middlesex, died 1888, aged 19

== Death ==
James Spencer-Bell died in on 22 February 1872, aged 53.

Mary Ann Spencer-Bell, his widow, died 16 August 1891, aged 59.

== Fawe Park ==
Fawe Park is a large Victorian house that was built in 1858 for James Bell (after 1866, called James Spencer-Bell). It was designed by Alfred Waterhouse. It is on the west bank of Derwent Water, opposite the town of Keswick. It is not open to the public (2020).

After James Spencer-Bell's death, the house was occupied by his son Frederick Spencer-Bell and following his early death, by his daughter Adelaide and her husband, Samuel Middleton Fox. After their deaths, it was occupied by their son, Commodore Frederick Middleton Fox. The current ownership has not yet been discovered.

=== Beatrix Potter ===
Beatrix Potter, author and illustrator of children's books visited the house in July 1903. The house was the setting one of the scenes in the 2006 film about her life, "Miss Potter".

=== Fawe Park Road, Putney ===
Fawe Park Road in Putney, South West London was developed by James Spencer-Bell and auctioned in 1894. The road still exists and runs east-west from Putney Bridge Road (A3209) to Disraeli Road.

Parliament of the United Kingdom
Preceded by Ross Donnelly Mangles; Henry Currie	Member of Parliament for Guildford; 1852 – 1857; With: Ross Donnelly Mangles	Succeeded by Ross Donnelly Mangles; William Bovill
