= Thomas Ingram =

Thomas Ingram may refer to:

== Politicians ==
- Thomas Ingram (MP for Guildford) (fl. 1415), English politician, MP for Guildford
- Sir Thomas Ingram (Royalist) (1614–1672), English politician
- Thomas Ingram (California politician), California's 3rd State Senate district senator, 1916–1929

== Others ==
- Thomas Ingram (cricketer), late 18th century English cricketer
- Thomas Lewis Ingram (1807–1868), British merchant and colonial administrator
- Tom Ingram (born 1993), British racing driver
