= Henry Colas (fl. 1393) =

English politician

Henry Colas (fl. 1393) of Guildford, Surrey, was an English politician.

Colas was the son of Henry Colas, MP for Guildford in 1377. He had one son, who was illegitimate.

He was a member (MP) of the parliament of England for Guildford in 1393.

Parliament of England
Preceded by John Gatyn; Robert Vitner	Member of Parliament for Guildford; 1393; With: John Thorne	Succeeded by ? ?
