= John Gregg =

John Gregg may refer to:

== Politicians ==
- John Gregg (Guildford MP) (died 1431 or after), English MP for Guildford
- John Gregg (Texas politician) (1828–1864), American politician from Texas who was killed in action during the American Civil War
- John R. Gregg (born 1954), American politician from Indiana

== Religion ==
- John Gregg (bishop of Cork) (1798–1878), Anglican Bishop of Cork, Cloyne and Ross, 1862–1878
- John Gregg (archbishop of Armagh) (1873–1961), Anglican Archbishop of Armagh 1939–1959

== Others ==
- John Irvin Gregg (1826–1892), United States Army general
- John Robert Gregg (1867–1948), Irish-born American inventor of Gregg shorthand
- John P. Gregg (1876–1963), head football coach at Louisiana State University, 1899
- John William Gregg (1880–1969), American landscape architect
- John Gregg (1899–1986), companion of philanthropist Robert Allerton
- John Gregg (baker) (1909–1964), British founder of Greggs bakery
- John Gregg (actor) (1939–2021), Australian actor
- John Gregg (loyalist) (1957–2003), Ulster loyalist, member of the UDA

== See also ==
- John Gregg Fee (1816–1901), founder of Berea College
- John Greig (disambiguation)
