= John Greig (disambiguation) =

John Greig is a Scottish footballer.

John Greig may also refer to:

- John Greig (basketball) (born 1961), NBA basketball player
- J. G. Greig (1871–1958), English cricketer
- John Greig (mathematician) (1759–1819), English mathematician
- John Greig (politician) (1779–1858), Representative from New York
- John Greig (bishop) (1925–1938), Bishop of Gibraltar then Guildford
- John Russell Greig (1889–1963), Scottish veterinarian
- John Keiller Greig (1881–1971), British figure skater
- John Greig (minister), 17th century minister

== See also ==
- John Gregg (disambiguation)
