= Bovonto =

Indian soft drink

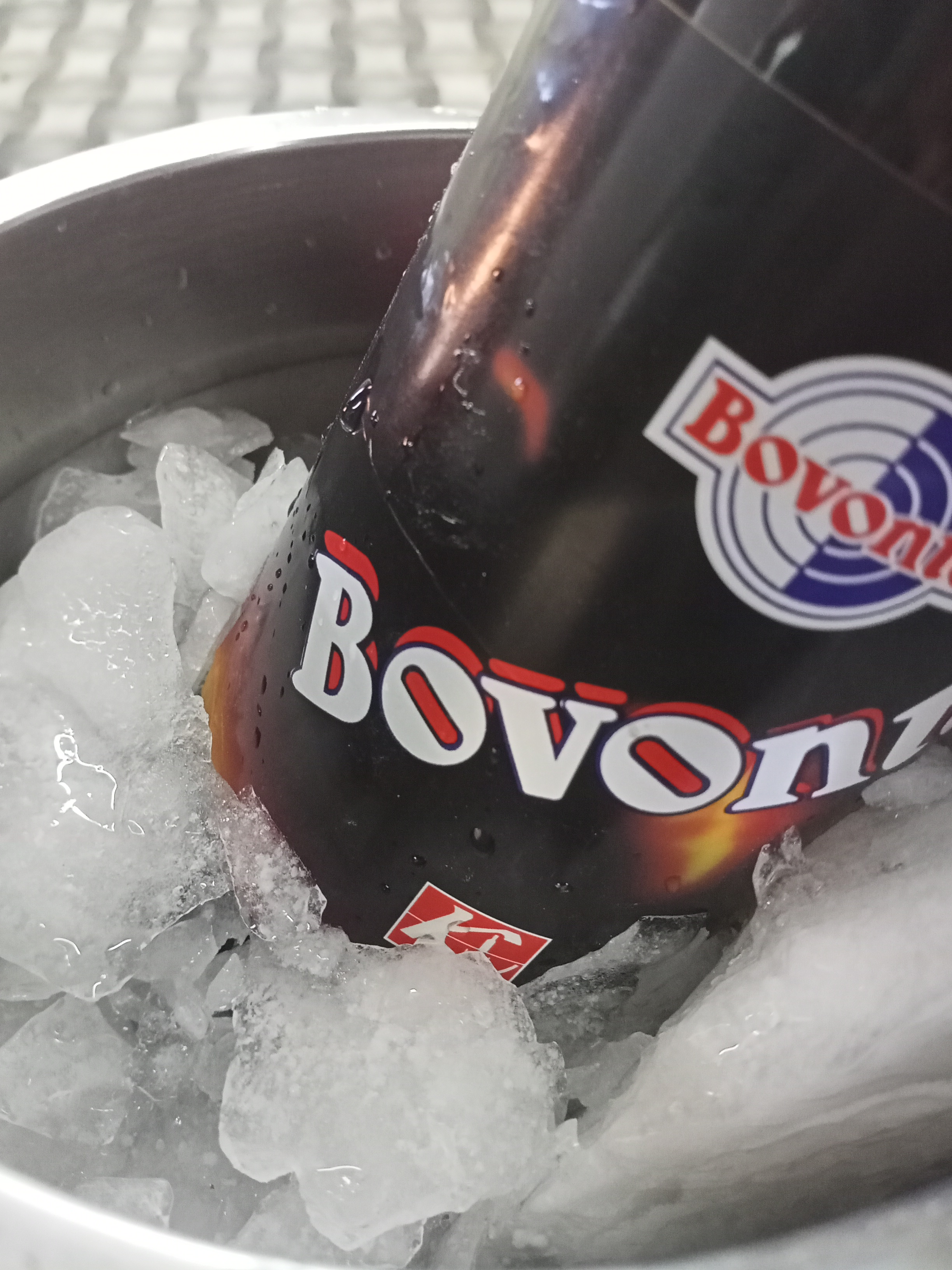
- Type: Colas
- Manufacturer: Kali Aerated Water Works
- Origin: India
- Introduced: 1958
- Related products: Trio; Solo; Frutang
- Website: Official website

Bovonto is a soft drink popular in Tamil Nadu, India.

It is manufactured and marketed by Kali Mark (Kalis Sparkling Water (P) Ltd.), which has offices and bottling plants at several locations in Tamil Nadu. At present, it has put up a distribution point at Chennai.

The drink is mildly carbonated and has a tangy grape-cola taste.

Kali mark is a regional-level player and is one of the very few indigenous soft-drink manufacturers in India that survived the onslaught of take-overs by multinational giants Pepsi and Coca-Cola, during the mid-1990s. Other than Bovonto, the company also used to produce soft drinks like Trio, Solo, and Frutang. The company still maintains a low profile in marketing and advertising. It has a minimal online presence.

== History ==
The product Bovonto came into existence in 1958, in Virudhunagar under Mr. P.V.S.K. Palaniappa Nadar. The company is being run by the fourth generation of the family.

During the 1990s, almost all of the local soft drinks were either bought or driven out of business by aggressive pricing and marketing by foreign competitors. But Kalimark made a strong ground in Tamil Nadu with almost all small players out of the game. Recently Kalimark group has reinvented itself with modern technology for production. The shape of the Bovonto pet bottle was redesigned and production was increased.

== Operations and Marketing ==
Over the years, Bovonto has contested against the Indian players such as Parle, and other MNCs for market share. When Pepsi and Coke entered the market, they sold 500 ml bottles at Rs 5, while Bovonto sold for Rs 8. Kalimark maintained its price. Kalimark is now a Rs 100 crore brand.

Bovonto does not do aggressive marketing, they mostly rely on word of mouth. Recently to increase their brand penetration they started sponsoring TV shows. Bovonto currently presents reality show on Vijay TV. The parent company of Bovonto has manufacturing units at eight places in Tamil Nadu. The company lacks economy of scale, but the strengths of the company include great product, a popular brand and strong distribution.
