= John Wharton =

John Wharton may refer to:

== Politicians ==
- John Wharton (fl. 1407–1420), MP for Guildford
- John Wharton (MP for Beverley) (1765–1843)
- John Lloyd Wharton (1837–1912), British Member of Parliament for Durham, 1871–1874, and Ripon, 1886–1906

== Others ==
- John Austin Wharton (1806–1838), soldier and statesman in the Republic of Texas
- John A. Wharton (1828–1865), lawyer, planter, and Confederate general during the American Civil War
- John F. Wharton (lawyer) (1894–1977), American lawyer and founding partner of Paul, Weiss, Rifkind, Wharton & Garrison LLP
- John F. Wharton (general) (born c. 1957), U.S. Army major general and career logistics officer
- John Harrison Wharton (1954–2018), American engineer specializing in microprocessors
