= John Dale (MP) =

16th-century English politician

John Dale (fl. 1529) was an English politician.

He was a Member (MP) of the Parliament of England for Guildford in 1529. There are several men of this name from the time, but none definitively identified as the MP.
