= Robert atte Mille =

English politician

Member of the Parliament of England for Guildford
- In office 1381–1381

Member of the Parliament of England for Guildford
- In office 1402–1402

Personal details
- Spouse: Alice

Robert atte Mille (fl. 1381–1402) of Guildford, Surrey, was an English politician.

== Family ==
His family were from the Surrey area. His wife was named Alice.

== Career ==
He was a Member (MP) of the Parliament of England for Guildford in 1381 and 1402.
