= Guildford (constituency) =

Parliamentary constituency in the United Kingdom, 1885 onwards

Coordinates: 51.27°N 0.51°W

- County constituency for the House of Commons
- Boundaries since 2024
- Boundary of Guildford in South East England
- County: Surrey
- Electorate: 71,367 (2023)
- Major settlements: Guildford; Worplesdon

Current constituency
- Created: 1885
- Member of Parliament: Zöe Franklin (Liberal Democrat)
- Seats: One

1295–1885
- Seats: 1295–1868: Two; 1868–1885: One
- Type of constituency: Borough constituency

Guildford is a constituency (Note: A county constituency (for the purposes of election expenses and type of returning officer)) in Surrey represented in the House of Commons of the UK Parliament since 2024 by Zöe Franklin, a Liberal Democrat. (Note: As with all constituencies, the constituency elects one Member of Parliament (MP) by the first past the post system of election at least every five years.)

== Constituency profile ==
The Guildford constituency is located in Surrey. It covers the large town of Guildford, which has a population of around 82,000, and the rural areas to its east including the villages of East Horsley and Send. Guildford is a historic town located around 27 miles (43 km) from central London and forms part of the city's wider urban area. The town is home to the University of Surrey, which has around 16,000 students. Guildford is generally suburban in character with a low proportion of high-density terraced housing. The town and its surroundings are highly affluent, with most parts of the constituency falling within the top 10% least-deprived areas in England. The average house price is considerably higher than the rest of South East England and almost double the national average.

In general, residents of the constituency are young and well-educated. They are likely to work in professional occupations and have very high levels of household income compared to the rest of the country. White people made up 84% of the population at the 2021 census, a similar proportion to the country as a whole. Asians were the largest ethnic minority group at 8%. At the local council level, the town is mostly represented by Liberal Democrats with some Labour Party representation in the more deprived Bellfields area. The villages and rural areas to the east mostly elected minor localist parties. An estimated 59% of voters in the constituency supported remaining in the European Union in the 2016 referendum, higher than the nationwide figure of 48%.

== History ==
From the first Commons in the Model Parliament of 1295 Guildford was a parliamentary borough sending two members to Parliament until 1868 (Note: To the House of Commons of England until 1708, then to the House of Commons of Great Britain until 1801, and to the House of Commons of the United Kingdom until 1885.) and one until 1885. In the latter years of sending two members a bloc vote system of elections was used. Until 1885 the electorate in the town of Guildford elected the member(s) of parliament, which expanded in 1885 into a county division of Guildford under the Redistribution of Seats Act 1885.

=== Early political history ===
The seat almost exclusively elected Conservatives between 1868 and 2001, with just two exceptions during that period. In 1868, Guildford Onslow, a Liberal, became the first MP to secure election to the single-member (as opposed to the previous two-member) borough constituency of Guildford. This was yet another example of a ‘centuries-old’ representation of Guildford by influential members of the Earl of Onslow's family, with Guildford Onslow himself, in turn, being defeated by a further member of this same family (from its minor Sussex and British Indian branch), Denzil Onslow, a Conservative, in the succeeding election of 1874. A majority of the seat's voters were again swayed toward the Liberal cause in the Liberal landslide year of the 1906 general election.

=== Modern political history ===
Successive elections in 2001 and 2005 saw marginal majorities of under 2% of the vote - in favour of a Liberal Democrat and then a Conservative. The 2015 result brought the incumbent MP, Anne Milton, a huge Conservative majority of more than 41 percentage points, up from 14 percentage points in 2010. However, the seat swung substantially towards the Liberal Democrats in the 2019 general election, and the Lib Dems then won the seat back from the Conservatives in 2024 with a majority of over 8,000.

== Boundaries ==
Context of 1906.
Context of 1923

Map of boundaries 2010–2024

1885–1918: The Boroughs of Guildford and Godalming, the Sessional Division of Farnham, and part of the Sessional Division of Guildford.

1918–1950: The Boroughs of Guildford and Godalming, the Urban District of Haslemere, (Note: Was part of Sessional Division of Farnham, the remainder of which formed, with Woking and most of modern Surrey Heath a new seat, named Farnham) the Rural District of Hambledon, and the Rural District of Guildford (Note: This meant rural gains from Chertsey e.g. Send, Ripley, E. & W. Clandon and E. & W. Horsley) except the civil parish of Pirbright.

1950–1983: The Borough of Guildford, in the Rural District of Guildford the parishes of Artington, Compton, Puttenham, Shackleford, Shalford, Wanborough, and Worplesdon, and in the Rural District of Hambledon the parishes of Alfold, Bramley, Busbridge, Cranleigh, Dunsfold, Ewhurst, Hambledon, Hascombe, and Wonersh.

1983–1997: The Borough of Guildford wards of Christchurch, Friary and St Nicolas, Holy Trinity, Merrow and Burpham, Onslow, Pilgrims, Shalford, Stoke, Stoughton, Tongham, Westborough, and Worplesdon, and the District of Waverley wards of Blackheath and Wonersh, Bramley, Cranleigh East, Cranleigh West, Ewhurst, and Shamley Green.

1997–2010: As above less Tongham ward.

2010–2024: The Borough of Guildford wards of Burpham, Christchurch, Friary and St Nicolas, Holy Trinity, Merrow, Onslow, Pilgrims, Shalford, Stoke, Stoughton, Westborough, and Worplesdon, and the Borough of Waverley wards of Alfold, Blackheath and Wonersh, Cranleigh East, Cranleigh Rural and Ellens Green, Cranleigh West, Ewhurst, and Shamley Green and Cranleigh North.

2024–present: The Borough of Guildford wards of Bellfields & Slyfield, Burpham, Castle, Clandon & Horsley, Effingham, Merrow, Onslow, Send & Lovelace, St Nicolas, Stoke, Stoughton North, Stoughton South, Westborough, and Worplesdon

Electorate reduced to bring it within the permitted range by transferring the parts in the Borough of Waverley, including Cranleigh to the newly created constituency of Godalming and Ash (except the small Ewhurst ward, which went to Dorking and Horley). To compensate, Clandon, Horsley, Effingham, Send and Lovelace in Guildford borough were added from the former Mole Valley seat.

== Members of Parliament ==
=== MPs 1295–1640 ===
Parliament	First member	Second member
1377	Henry Colas	
1381	Robert atte Mille	
1386	John Gatyn	Henry Marlborough
1388 (Feb)	John Bonet	Robert Chesenhale
1388 (Sep)	John Thorne	Robert Vinter
1390 (Jan)	Thomas Brocas	Robert Vinter
1390 (Nov)		
1391	John Gatyn	Robert Vinter
1393	John Thorne	Henry Colas
1394		
1395	John Gatyn	Thomas Brocas
1397 (Jan)	John Gatyn	John Bonet
1397 (Sep)	Robert Chesenhale	Robert Vinter
1399	John Gatyn	John Bonet
1401	John Gatyn	Robert Hornmede
1402	Robert atte Mille	John Cross
1404 (Jan)	John Gatyn	Thomas Brocas
1404 (Oct)		
1406	William Gregory	Henry Rose
1407	Robert Hull	John Wharton
1410		
1411		
1413 (Feb)		
1413 (May)	Ralph Wimbledon	Richard Eton
1414 (Apr)		
1414 (Nov)	William Waterman	Geoffrey Mudge
1415	Thomas Ingram	William Weston
1416 (Mar)	John Hipperon	Richard Eton
1416 (Oct)		
1417	William Walsh	John Gregg
1419	John Stoughton	William Weston
1420	Richard Woking	John Wharton
1421 (May)	Thomas Waller	John Gregg
1421 (Dec)	Thomas Waller	Richard Woking
1510-1523	No names known	
1529	Sir Thomas Palmer	John Dale
1536	?	
1539	?William Fitzwilliam	?John Bourne
1542	Sir John Baker	William Fitzwilliam
1545	Anthony Browne	Thomas Elyot
1547	Sir Anthony Browne	Thomas Elyot, died and repl. by Jan 1552 by Thomas Stoughton
1553 (Mar)	?	
1553 (Oct)	William More	William Hammond
1554 (Apr)	George Tadlow	William Hammond
1554 (Nov)	Henry Polsted	William More
1555	Henry Polsted	William More
1558	Edward Popham	William Hammond
1559	Sir Thomas Palmer	Thomas Stoughton
1562–3	Thomas Bromley	John Austen
1571	Peter Osborne	Henry Knollys
1572	William More	Thomas Stoughton, died and repl. Jan 1581 by Lawrence Stoughton
1584	George More	Laurence Stoughton
1586	George More	Laurence Stoughton
1588	Sir William More	George More
1593	George More	Laurence Stoughton
1597	Sir William More I	Sir Robert Southwell
1601	Robert More	William Jackson
1604	Sir George More	George Austen
1614	Sir Robert More	George Stoughton
1621	Sir Robert More	John Murray
1624	Sir Robert More	Nicholas Stoughton
1625	Sir Robert More	Robert Parkhurst, jnr
1626	Richard Shilton; Shilton did not take his seat, and was replaced by Sir William Morley	Robert Parkhurst, jnr
1628	Robert Parkhurst	Poynings More
1629–1640	No Parliaments summoned	

=== MPs 1640–1868 ===
Prior to 1868 the constituency was jointly represented by two MPs.

Election	First member	First party	Second member	Second party
April 1640	Sir Robert Parkhurst	Parliamentarian	George Abbotts	Parliamentarian
November 1640	Sir Robert Parkhurst	Parliamentarian	George Abbotts	Parliamentarian
1645	Sir Robert Parkhurst	Parliamentarian	Nicholas Stoughton	Recruiter
1648	?		?	
1653	Guildford not represented in Barebones Parliament			
1654	Richard Hiller or Hillier		One seat only	
1656	Colonel John Hewson		One seat only	
1659	Carew Raleigh		Robert Parkhurst	
1660	Richard Onslow		Arthur Onslow	
1664	Thomas Dalmahoy		Arthur Onslow	
March 1679	Thomas Dalmahoy		Richard Onslow	Whig
October 1679	Morgan Randyll		Richard Onslow	Whig
1685	Heneage Finch	Tory	Richard Onslow	Whig
1689	Foot Onslow		John Weston	Tory
1690	Foot Onslow		Morgan Randyll	
1701	Denzil Onslow	Whig	Morgan Randyll	
1705	Denzil Onslow	Whig	Robert Wroth	
1708	Denzil Onslow	Whig	Morgan Randyll	
1710	Denzil Onslow	Whig	Robert Wroth	
1711	Denzil Onslow	Whig	Morgan Randyll	
1713	Sir Richard Onslow, Bt	Whig	Morgan Randyll	
1714	Denzil Onslow	Whig	Morgan Randyll	
1717	Robert Wroth		Morgan Randyll	
1720	Arthur Onslow	Whig	Morgan Randyll	
1722	Arthur Onslow	Whig	Thomas Brodrick	
1727	Arthur Onslow	Whig	Colonel Richard Onslow	
1728	Henry Vincent		Colonel Richard Onslow	
1734	Hon. Richard Onslow		Colonel Richard Onslow	
1740 by-election	Denzil Onslow		Colonel Richard Onslow	
1747	Sir John Elwill, Bt	Tory	Colonel Richard Onslow	
1760 by-election	Sir John Elwill, Bt	Tory	George Onslow	Tory
1768	Sir Fletcher Norton		George Onslow	Tory
1782 by-election	William Norton		George Onslow	Tory
1784	Viscount Cranley	Whig	Chapple Norton	
1790	Viscount Cranley	Whig	George Holme Sumner	Tory
1796	Viscount Cranley	Whig	Chapple Norton	Whig
1806	Thomas Cranley Onslow	Tory	George Holme Sumner (Note: At the 1806 general election, two Tories were returned: Onslow and Sumner. However, a petition was lodged, and on 16 March 1807 Sumner's election was overturned in favour of the 3rd-placed candidate, the Whig Chapple Norton)	Tory
March 1807	Thomas Cranley Onslow	Tory	Chapple Norton	Whig
1812	Thomas Cranley Onslow	Tory	Arthur Onslow	Tory
1818	William Best	Whig	Arthur Onslow	Tory
1819 by-election	Charles Baring Wall	Tory	Arthur Onslow	Tory
1826	George Chapple Norton	Whig	Arthur Onslow	Tory
1830	Charles Baring Wall	Tory	George Holme Sumner	Tory
1831	Charles Francis Norton	Whig	James Mangles	Whig
1832	Charles Baring Wall	Tory	James Mangles	Whig
1834	Charles Baring Wall	Conservative	James Mangles	Whig
1837	Charles Baring Wall	Conservative	James Yorke Scarlett	Conservative
1841	Charles Baring Wall	Whig	Ross Donnelly Mangles	Whig
1847	Henry Currie	Conservative	Ross Donnelly Mangles	Whig
1852	James Bell	Radical	Ross Donnelly Mangles	Whig
1857	William Bovill	Conservative	Ross Donnelly Mangles	Whig
1858 by-election	William Bovill	Conservative	Guildford Onslow	Whig
1859	William Bovill	Conservative	Guildford Onslow	Liberal
1866 by-election	Richard Garth	Conservative	Guildford Onslow	Liberal
1868	Representation reduced to one member			

=== MPs since 1868 ===
Election	Member	Party
1868	Guildford Onslow	Liberal
1874	Denzil Onslow	Conservative
1885	St John Brodrick	Conservative
1906	Henry Cowan	Liberal
Jan 1910	Edgar Horne	Conservative
1922	Henry Buckingham	Conservative
1931 by-election	Charles Rhys	Conservative
1935	Sir John Jarvis, Bt	Conservative
1950	Richard Nugent	Conservative
1966	David Howell	Conservative
1997	Nick St Aubyn	Conservative
2001	Sue Doughty	Liberal Democrat
2005	Anne Milton	Conservative
2019	Anne Milton	Independent
2019	Angela Richardson	Conservative
2024	Zöe Franklin	Liberal Democrat

== Elections ==
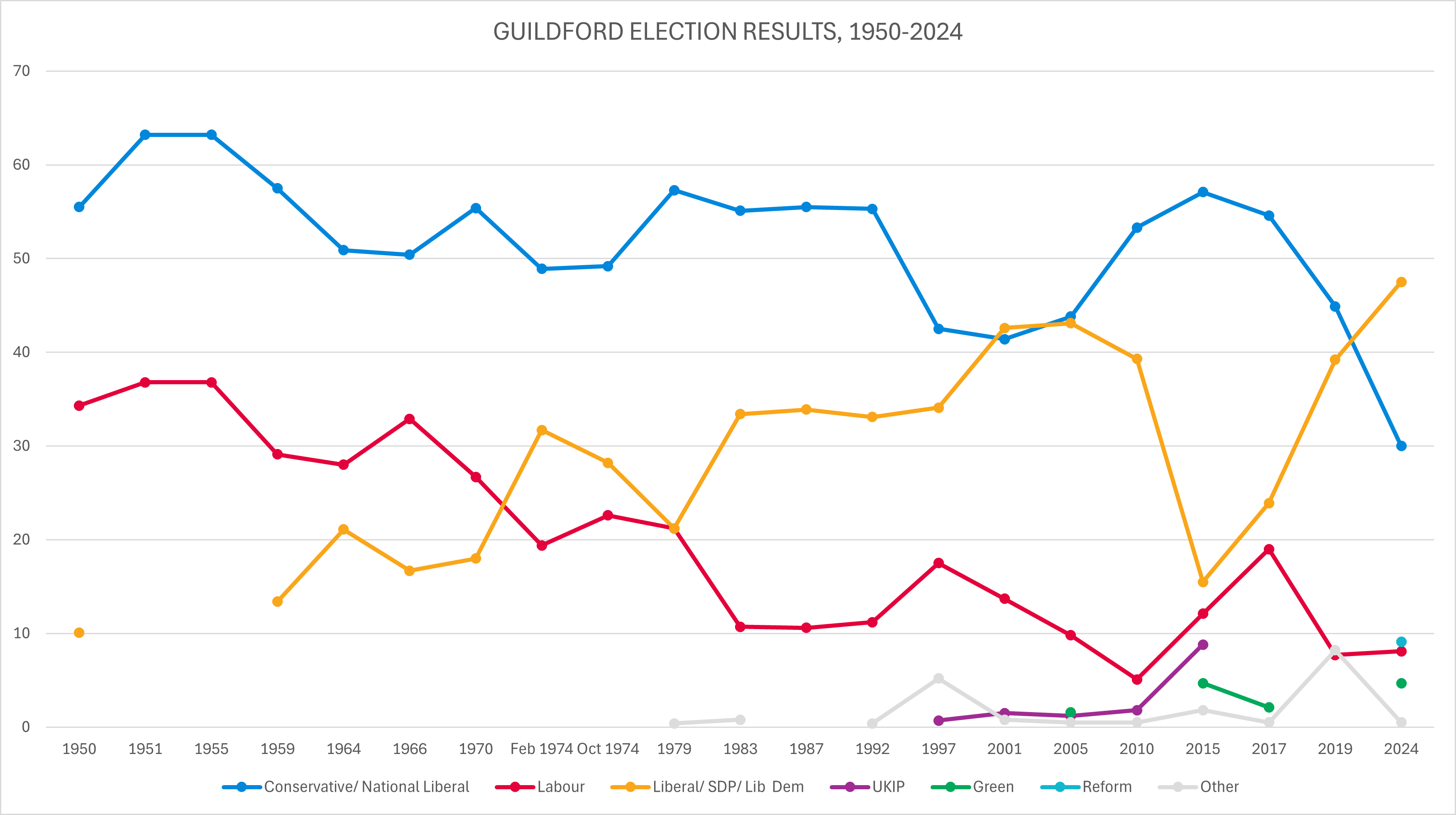
Election results 1950-2024

=== Elections in the 2020s ===
General election 2024: Guildford
Party	Candidate	Votes	%	±%
Liberal Democrats	Zöe Franklin	22,937	47.5	+8.3
Conservative	Angela Richardson	14,508	30.0	−15.1
Reform	Dennis Saunders	4,395	9.1	N/A
Labour	Sarah Gillinson	3,931	8.1	−0.3
Green	Sam Peters	2,268	4.7	+4.3
Peace	John Morris	255	0.5	−0.4
Majority		8,429	17.5	N/A
Turnout		48,294	68.3	−5.4
Registered electors		70,734		
Liberal Democrats gain from Conservative		Swing	+11.7	

=== Elections in the 2010s ===
2019 notional result
Party	Vote	%
Conservative	23,708	45.1
Liberal Democrats	20,591	39.2
Labour	4,411	8.4
Others	3,677	6.9
Green	197	0.4
Turnout	52,584	73.7
Electorate	71,367	

General election 2019: Guildford
Party	Candidate	Votes	%	±%
Conservative	Angela Richardson	26,317	44.9	−9.7
Liberal Democrats	Zöe Franklin	22,980	39.2	+15.3
Labour	Anne Rouse	4,515	7.7	−11.3
Independent	Anne Milton	4,356	7.4	new
Peace	John Morris	483	0.8	+0.4
Majority		3,337	5.7	−25.0
Turnout		58,651	75.5	+1.8
Registered electors		77,729		
Conservative hold		Swing	−12.5	

General election 2017: Guildford
Party	Candidate	Votes	%	±%
Conservative	Anne Milton	30,295	54.6	−2.5
Liberal Democrats	Zöe Franklin	13,255	23.9	+8.4
Labour	Howard Smith	10,545	19.0	+6.9
Green	Mark Bray-Parry	1,152	2.1	−2.6
Peace	John Morris	205	0.4	0.0
Independent	Semi Essessi	57	0.1	New
Majority		17,040	30.7	−10.9
Turnout		55,509	73.7	+2.4
Conservative hold		Swing	−5.5	

General election 2015: Guildford
Party	Candidate	Votes	%	±%
Conservative	Anne Milton	30,802	57.1	+3.8
Liberal Democrats	Kelly-Marie Blundell	8,354	15.5	−23.8
Labour	Richard Wilson	6,534	12.1	+7.0
UKIP	Harry Aldridge	4,774	8.8	+7.0
Green	John Pletts	2,558	4.7	New
Guildford Greenbelt Group	Susan Parker	538	1.0	New
Peace	John Morris	230	0.4	−0.1
CISTA	Gerri Smyth	196	0.4	New
Majority		22,448	41.6	+27.6
Turnout		53,986	71.3	−0.8
Conservative hold		Swing	+13.8	

General election 2010: Guildford
Party	Candidate	Votes	%	±%
Conservative	Anne Milton	29,618	53.3	+9.9
Liberal Democrats	Sue Doughty	21,836	39.3	−4.0
Labour	Tim Shand	2,812	5.1	−4.8
UKIP	Mazhar Manzoor	1,021	1.8	+0.6
Peace	John Morris	280	0.5	+0.2
Majority		7,782	14.0	+13.3
Turnout		55,567	72.1	+5.0
Conservative hold		Swing	+5.5	

=== Elections in the 2000s ===
General election 2005: Guildford
Party	Candidate	Votes	%	±%
Conservative	Anne Milton	22,595	43.8	+2.4
Liberal Democrats	Sue Doughty	22,248	43.1	+0.5
Labour	Karen Landles	5,054	9.8	−3.9
Green	John Pletts	811	1.6	New
UKIP	Martin Haslam	645	1.2	−0.3
Peace	John Morris	166	0.3	−0.5
Independent	Victoria Lavin	112	0.2	New
Majority		347	0.7	N/A
Turnout		51,631	68.3	+5.6
Conservative gain from Liberal Democrats		Swing	+0.9	

General election 2001: Guildford
Party	Candidate	Votes	%	±%
Liberal Democrats	Sue Doughty	20,358	42.6	+8.5
Conservative	Nick St Aubyn	19,820	41.4	−1.1
Labour	Joyce Still	6,558	13.7	−3.8
UKIP	Sonya Porter	736	1.5	+0.8
Peace	John Morris	370	0.8	+0.3
Majority		538	1.2	N/A
Turnout		47,842	62.7	−11.9
Liberal Democrats gain from Conservative		Swing	+4.7	

=== Elections in the 1990s ===
General election 1997: Guildford
Party	Candidate	Votes	%	±%
Conservative	Nick St Aubyn	24,230	42.5	−12.8
Liberal Democrats	Margaret Sharp	19,439	34.1	+1.3
Labour	Joseph Burns	9,945	17.5	+6.1
Referendum	James Gore	2,650	4.7	New
UKIP	Robert McWhirter	400	0.7	New
Peace	John Morris	294	0.5	New
Majority		4,791	8.4	−14.1
Turnout		56,958	74.6	
Conservative hold		Swing	−7.05 (Note: Due to ward changes somewhat notional (Con-Lib Dem) swing and (Con-Lab) was higher: −9.45)	

This constituency underwent boundary changes between the 1992 and 1997 general elections and thus change in share of vote is based on a notional calculation.

General election 1992: Guildford
Party	Candidate	Votes	%	±%
Conservative	David Howell	33,516	55.3	−0.2
Liberal Democrats	Margaret Sharp	20,112	33.1	−0.8
Labour	Howard Mann	6,781	11.2	+0.6
Natural Law	Alex Law	234	0.4	New
Majority		13,404	22.2	+0.6
Turnout		60,643	78.5	+3.2
Conservative hold		Swing	+0.3	

=== Elections in the 1980s ===
General election 1987: Guildford
Party	Candidate	Votes	%	±%
Conservative	David Howell	32,504	55.5	+0.4
SDP	Margaret Sharp	19,897	33.9	+0.5
Labour	Robert Wolverson	6,216	10.6	−0.1
Majority		12,607	21.6	−0.1
Turnout		58,617	75.3	+2.8
Conservative hold		Swing	−0.1 (Note: Con to Lib)	

General election 1983: Guildford
Party	Candidate	Votes	%	±%
Conservative	David Howell	30,016	55.1	−2.2
SDP	Margaret Sharp	18,192	33.4	+12.2
Labour	Keith Chesterton	5,853	10.7	−10.5
Party of Associates with Licensees	Anthony Farrell	425	0.8	New
Majority		11,824	21.7	−14.4
Turnout		54,486	72.5	−2.8
Conservative hold		Swing	−7.2 (Note: Notional Con to SDP swing, most of this swing was Lab and Lib to SDP, shown by the single party swing of −2.2%)	

=== Elections in the 1970s ===
General election 1979: Guildford
Party	Candidate	Votes	%	±%
Conservative	David Howell	31,595	57.3	+8.1
Labour	Paul Blagbrough	11,689	21.2	−1.4
Liberal	Henry Donnelly	11,673	21.2	−7.0
Independent Rhodesian Front	Peter Scott	232	0.4	New
Majority		19,906	36.1	+15.1
Turnout		55,189	75.3	+3.4
Conservative hold		Swing	+4.75	

General election October 1974: Guildford
Party	Candidate	Votes	%	±%
Conservative	David Howell	25,564	49.2	+0.3
Liberal	Christopher Fox	14,660	28.2	−3.5
Labour	Robert Harris	11,727	22.6	+3.2
Majority		10,904	21.0	+3.8
Turnout		51,951	71.9	−8.5
Conservative hold		Swing	+1.9 (Note: Again mostly an opposite sign swing caused by a larger other two-party swing. Here: Lib to Lab)	

General election February 1974: Guildford
Party	Candidate	Votes	%	±%
Conservative	David Howell	28,152	48.9	−6.5
Liberal	Christopher Fox	18,261	31.7	+13.7
Labour	Jean Crow	11,175	19.4	−7.3
Majority		9,891	17.2	−11.5
Turnout		57,588	80.4	+8.4
Conservative hold		Swing	−10.1	

General election 1970: Guildford
Party	Candidate	Votes	%	±%
Conservative	David Howell	27,203	55.4	+5.0
Labour	Patton Smith	13,108	26.7	−6.2
Liberal	Michael Walton	8,822	18.0	+1.3
Majority		14,095	28.7	+11.2
Turnout		49,133	72.0	−6.7
Conservative hold		Swing	+5.6	

=== Elections in the 1960s ===
General election 1966: Guildford
Party	Candidate	Votes	%	±%
Conservative	David Howell	24,116	50.4	−0.5
Labour	Cedric Thornberry	15,771	32.9	+4.9
Liberal	John R. Buchanan	7,992	16.7	−4.4
Majority		8,345	17.5	−5.4
Turnout		47,879	78.7	+0.1
Conservative hold		Swing		

General election 1964: Guildford
Party	Candidate	Votes	%	±%
Conservative	George Nugent	24,277	50.9	−6.6
Labour	Gwilym Emrys H Griffith	13,365	28.0	−1.1
Liberal	Christopher John N Martin	10,052	21.1	+7.7
Majority		10,912	22.9	−5.5
Turnout		47,694	78.6	−1.6
Conservative hold		Swing	−2.8	

=== Elections in the 1950s ===
General election 1959: Guildford
Party	Candidate	Votes	%	±%
Conservative	Richard Nugent	27,198	57.5	−5.7
Labour	George R. Bellerby	13,756	29.1	−7.7
Liberal	Arthur Braybrooke	6,318	13.4	New
Majority		13,442	28.4	+2.0
Turnout		47,272	80.2	+3.8
Conservative hold		Swing	+1.0 (Note: Theoretical Con-Lab swing but wiped out by gains from an additional opponent party, a Liberal)	

General election 1955: Guildford
Party	Candidate	Votes	%	±%
Conservative	Richard Nugent	27,113	63.20	0.0
Labour	George R Bellerby	15,785	36.79	0.0
Majority		11,328	26.41	0.0
Turnout		42,898	76.4	−3.2
Conservative hold		Swing	0.0	

General election 1951: Guildford
Party	Candidate	Votes	%	±%
Conservative	Richard Nugent	27,604	63.20	+7.7
Labour	Vernon Wilkinson	16,068	36.79	+2.5
Majority		11,536	26.41	+5.2
Turnout		43,672	79.6	−4.5
Conservative hold		Swing	+5.1	

General election 1950: Guildford
Party	Candidate	Votes	%	±%
Conservative	Richard Nugent	24,983	55.5	+5.5
Labour	Vernon Wilkinson	15,443	34.3	+1.4
Liberal	Frederick Philpott	4,552	10.12	−7.0
Majority		9,540	21.21	+4.1
Turnout		44,978	84.07	+9.2
Conservative hold		Swing		

Boundaries were redrawn in time for the 1950 general election. From 1918 to 1950 the three parts of western Surrey are set out at the 1918 results below. The next change saw an additional seat duty carved out, to be Woking. As a result, Guildford, now oversized, shrank considerably in area and population. To the south the areas of Godalming, Elstead, Thursley, Whitley, Haslemere and Chiddingford were added to the Farnham seat. To the east Send, Ripley, Wisley, Ockham, St Martha, Albury, Shere, Clandon and Horsley were added to Dorking.

These boundaries centred on the town of Guildford plus an area southwards towards Cranleigh, became, with small changes in later reviews, form the basic shape for Guildford until present.

=== Elections in the 1940s ===
General election 1945: Guildford
Party	Candidate	Votes	%	±%
Conservative	John Jarvis	33,091	50.0	−25.0
Labour	Vernon George Wilkinson	21,789	32.93	+7.87
Liberal	Joseph Gerald Curie Ruston	11,281	17.1	New
Majority		11,302	17.1	−32.8
Turnout		66,161	74.9	+5.6
Conservative hold		Swing	−16.4	

=== Elections in the 1930s ===
General election 1935: Guildford
Party	Candidate	Votes	%	±%
Conservative	John Jarvis	35,384	74.98	
Labour	FA Campbell	11,833	25.06	
Majority		23,551	49.88	
Turnout		47,217	69.27	
Conservative hold		Swing		

General election 1931: Guildford
Party	Candidate	Votes	%	±%
Conservative	Charles Rhys	39,008	86.21	
Labour	Sidney Peck	6,242	13.79	
Majority		32,766	72.42	
Turnout		45,250	72.26	
Conservative hold		Swing		

1931 Guildford by-election
Party	Candidate	Votes	%	±%
Conservative	Charles Rhys	Unopposed	N/A	N/A
Conservative hold				

=== Elections in the 1920s ===
General election 1929: Guildford
Party	Candidate	Votes	%	±%
Unionist	Henry Buckingham	20,550	48.3	−14.0
Liberal	Somerset Stopford Brooke	15,984	37.6	+21.1
Labour	Lawrence Miles Worsnop	5,996	14.1	−7.1
Majority		4,566	10.7	−30.4
Turnout		42,530	72.1	+0.8
Registered electors		58,958		
Unionist hold		Swing	−17.6	

General election 1924: Guildford
Party	Candidate	Votes	%	±%
Unionist	Henry Buckingham	18,273	62.3	+10.0
Labour	Frank Markham	6,227	21.2	+1.7
Liberal	Samuel Parnell Kerr	4,842	16.5	−11.7
Majority		12,046	41.1	+17.0
Turnout		29,342	71.3	+3.7
Registered electors		41,164		
Unionist hold		Swing	+4.2	

General election 1923: Guildford
Party	Candidate	Votes	%	±%
Unionist	Henry Buckingham	14,117	52.3	−18.3
Liberal	Samuel Parnell Kerr	7,601	28.2	New
Labour	William Bennett	5,260	19.5	−9.9
Majority		6,516	24.1	−17.1
Turnout		26,978	67.6	+2.2
Registered electors		39,931		
Unionist hold		Swing	−4.2	

General election 1922: Guildford
Party	Candidate	Votes	%	±%
Unionist	Henry Buckingham	18,045	70.6	−1.5
Labour	William Bennett	7,514	29.4	+1.5
Majority		10,531	41.2	−3.0
Turnout		25,559	65.4	+15.4
Registered electors		39,087		
Unionist hold		Swing	−1.5	

=== Elections in the 1910s ===
General election 1918: Guildford
Party		Candidate	Votes	%	±%
C	Unionist	Edgar Horne	13,149	72.1	+8.4
	Labour	William Bennett	5,078	27.9	New
Majority			8,071	44.2	+16.8
Turnout			18,227	50.0	−33.0
Registered electors			36,427		
	Unionist hold		Swing		
C indicates candidate endorsed by the coalition government.

From 1885 to 1918 the west part of Surrey had been represented by two seats - in the north the seat of Chertsey, in the south that of Guildford. Boundaries were redrawn for proper apportionment in time for the 1918 general election such that the same area saw three seats - Farnham in the west, Chertsey in the north east and Guildford in the south east.

As a result, the seat lost the areas of Ash, Normandy, Seale, Frensham and Farnham, towards its west, but to the east gained the areas of Merrow, Send, Ripley, Ockham, Wisley, Clandon and Horsley from Chertsey.

Horne

General election December 1910: Guildford
Party	Candidate	Votes	%	±%
Conservative	Edgar Horne	8,463	63.7	−1.1
Liberal	Arthur Jex Davey	4,832	36.3	+1.1
Majority		3,631	27.4	−2.2
Turnout		13,295	83.0	−6.2
Registered electors		16,020		
Conservative hold		Swing	−1.1	

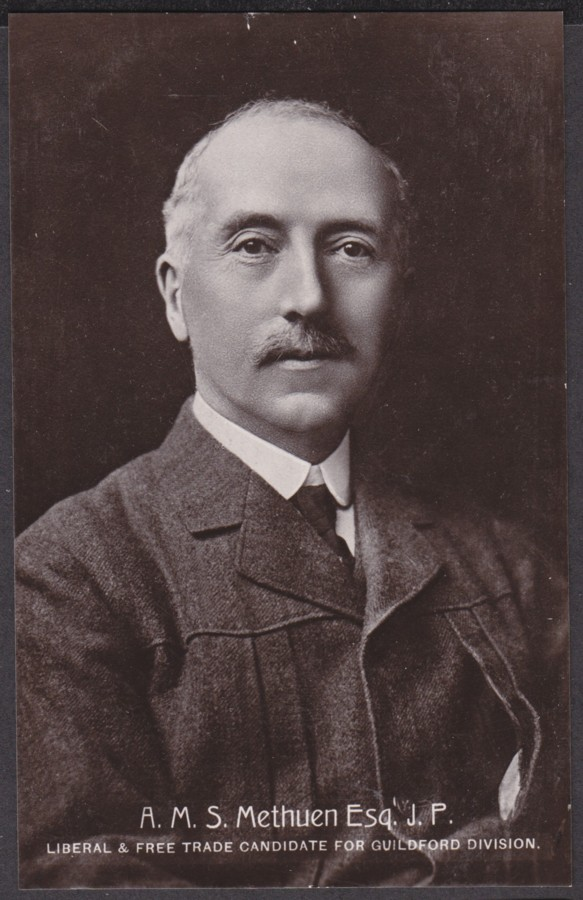
Methuen

General election January 1910: Guildford
Party	Candidate	Votes	%	±%
Conservative	Edgar Horne	9,264	64.8	+18.1
Liberal	Algernon Methuen	5,033	35.2	−18.1
Majority		4,231	29.6	N/A
Turnout		14,297	89.2	+5.8
Registered electors		16,020		
Conservative gain from Liberal		Swing	+18.1	

=== Elections in the 1900s ===
Cowan

General election January 1906: Guildford
Party	Candidate	Votes	%	±%
Liberal	Henry Cowan	6,430	53.3	+15.0
Conservative	St John Brodrick	5,630	46.7	−15.0
Majority		800	6.6	N/A
Turnout		12,060	83.4	+7.9
Registered electors		14,469		
Liberal gain from Conservative		Swing	+15.0	

1900 Guildford by-election
Party	Candidate	Votes	%	±%
Conservative	St John Brodrick	Unopposed		
Conservative hold				

General election 1900: Guildford
Party	Candidate	Votes	%	±%
Conservative	St John Brodrick	5,816	61.7	N/A
Liberal	AW Chapman	3,609	38.3	New
Majority		2,207	23.4	N/A
Turnout		9,425	75.5	N/A
Registered electors		12,477		
Conservative hold		Swing	N/A	

=== Elections in the 1890s ===
General election 1895: Guildford
Party	Candidate	Votes	%	±%
Conservative	St John Brodrick	Unopposed		
Conservative hold				

General election 1892: Guildford
Party	Candidate	Votes	%	±%
Conservative	St John Brodrick	5,191	58.3	N/A
Liberal	George Patrick Charles Lawrence	3,720	41.7	New
Majority		1,471	16.6	N/A
Turnout		8,911	79.2	N/A
Registered electors		11,248		
Conservative hold		Swing	N/A	

=== Elections in the 1880s ===
General election 1886: Guildford
Party	Candidate	Votes	%	±%
Conservative	St John Brodrick	Unopposed		
Conservative hold				

General election 1885: Guildford
Party	Candidate	Votes	%	±%
Conservative	St John Brodrick	4,485	54.5	−0.8
Liberal	Ellis Duncombe Gosling	3,750	45.5	+0.8
Majority		735	9.0	−1.6
Turnout		8,235	82.5	−8.3
Registered electors		9,978		
Conservative hold		Swing	−0.8	

Constituency boundaries were redrawn in time for the 1885 general election. From 1868 to 1885 the west part of Surrey had been represented by two constituencies, one known as Guildford (which consisted of the town centre of Guildford and little else) and one constituency known as Surrey Western, which comprised the rest of that part of the county of Surrey. The Guildford constituency was both geographically and in size of electorate significantly smaller than the Surrey Western constituency. The 1885 to 1918 constituency boundaries saw the area of west Surrey divided into two constituencies more equal in size of population and land area. The north part of west Surrey was given the constituency name Chertsey, the south part Guildford.

General election 1880: Guildford
Party	Candidate	Votes	%	±%
Conservative	Denzil Onslow	705	55.3	−5.7
Liberal	Thomas R. Kemp	571	44.7	+5.7
Majority		134	10.6	−11.4
Turnout		1,276	90.8	+6.3
Registered electors		1,406		
Conservative hold		Swing	−5.7	

=== Elections in the 1870s ===
General election 1874: Guildford
Party	Candidate	Votes	%	±%
Conservative	Denzil Onslow	673	61.0	+12.0
Liberal	Guildford Onslow	430	39.0	−12.0
Majority		243	22.0	N/A
Turnout		1,103	84.5	−1.7
Registered electors		1,306		
Conservative gain from Liberal		Swing	+12.0	

=== Elections in the 1860s ===
General election 1868: Guildford
Party	Candidate	Votes	%	±%
Liberal	Guildford Onslow	536	51.0	−12.8
Conservative	Richard Garth	515	49.0	+12.8
Majority		21	2.0	+0.3
Turnout		1,051	86.2	−3.5
Registered electors		1,219		
Liberal hold		Swing	−12.8	

Constituency boundaries were redrawn in time for the 1868 election.

Prior to the 1868 general election, the constituency of Guildford was represented by two Members of Parliament. That was reduced to one from 1868 onwards.

The 1868 to 1885 constituency known as Guildford was geographically limited to an area around the current centre of Guildford town. This is in marked contrast to the various post-1885 versions of the constituency known as Guildford all of which have had a much greater geographical area. The 1868 constituency was, at its maximum, little over one mile east to west, and just over one mile north to south. (Most of the area which is in the modern constituency of Guildford would in 1868 have been part of the Surrey Western Constituency, rather than the Guildford Constituency.)

By-election, 17 December 1866: Guildford
Party	Candidate	Votes	%	±%
Conservative	Richard Garth	339	53.0	+16.8
Liberal	William Willmer Pocock	301	47.0	−16.8
Majority		38	6.0	−4.3
Turnout		640	96.0	+6.3
Registered electors		667		
Conservative hold		Swing	+16.8	

The 17 December 1866 by-election was caused by Bovill resigning as an MP following his appointment to judicial office, namely Chief Justice of the Court of Common Pleas.

By-election, 11 July 1866: Guildford
Party	Candidate	Votes	%	±%
Conservative	William Bovill	316	96.6	+60.4
Liberal	Henry Lawes Long	11	3.4	−60.4
Majority		305	93.2	+82.9
Turnout		327	49.0	−40.7
Registered electors		667		
Conservative hold		Swing	+60.4	

The 11 July 1866 by-election resulted from the need of Bovill to seek re-election upon his appointment as Solicitor General for England and Wales. Long withdrew from the contest before polling.

General election 1865: Guildford (top 2 candidates elected)
Party	Candidate	Votes	%	±%
Liberal	Guildford Onslow	333	37.9	N/A
Conservative	William Bovill	318	36.2	N/A
Liberal	William Willmer Pocock	228	25.9	N/A
Turnout		599 (est)	89.7 (est)	N/A
Registered electors		667		
Majority		15	1.7	N/A
Liberal hold		Swing	N/A	
Majority		90	10.3	N/A
Conservative hold		Swing	N/A	

=== Elections in the 1850s ===
Party designations for many candidates during the 1830s, 1840s and 1850s can be problematic as party ties were not as strong as those that developed, in Britain, in the late 19th century. Therefore, for the 1830s to 1850s election results, listed below, the term Liberal includes Whigs and Radicals; and the term Conservative includes Tories and Peelites, unless otherwise specified.

General election 1859: Guildford (top 2 candidates elected)
Party	Candidate	Votes	%	±%
Liberal	Guildford Onslow	Unopposed		
Conservative	William Bovill	Unopposed		
Registered electors		677		
Liberal hold				
Conservative hold				

By-election, 22 October 1858: Guildford
Party	Candidate	Votes	%	±%
Whig	Guildford Onslow	268	52.9	+12.0
Conservative	William John Evelyn	239	47.1	+7.5
Majority		29	5.8	+4.5
Turnout		507	76.1	+12.0
Registered electors		666		
Whig hold		Swing	+2.3	

The 22 October 1858 by-election was caused by RD Mangles resigning as an MP following his appointment as Member of the Council of India.

General election 1857: Guildford (top 2 candidates elected)
Party	Candidate	Votes	%	±%
Whig	Ross Donnelly Mangles	349	40.9	−1.9
Conservative	William Bovill	338	39.6	+11.4
Radical	James Bell	167	19.6	−9.4
Turnout		427 (est)	64.1 (est)	−2.6
Registered electors		666		
Majority		11	1.3	−12.5
Whig hold		Swing	−3.8	
Majority		171	20.0	N/A
Conservative gain from Radical		Swing	+10.4	

General election 1852: Guildford (top 2 candidates elected)
Party	Candidate	Votes	%	±%
Whig	Ross Donnelly Mangles	370	42.8	+11.0
Radical	James Bell	251	29.0	N/A
Conservative	Thomas Lyon Thurlow	244	28.2	−40.0
Turnout		433 (est)	66.7 (est)	+1.6
Registered electors		648		
Majority		119	13.8	+6.1
Whig hold		Swing	+15.5	
Majority		7	0.8	N/A
Radical gain from Conservative		Swing	N/A	

=== Elections in the 1840s ===
General election 1847: Guildford (top 2 candidates elected)
Party	Candidate	Votes	%	±%
Conservative	Henry Currie	336	44.1	+24.0
Whig	Ross Donnelly Mangles	242	31.8	−26.0
Conservative	Thomas Lyon Thurlow	184	24.1	+2.0
Turnout		381 (est)	65.1 (est)	−17.4
Registered electors		585		
Majority		94	12.3	N/A
Conservative gain from Whig		Swing	+18.5	
Majority		58	7.7	+2.2
Whig hold		Swing	−26.0	

General election 1841: Guildford (top 2 candidates elected)
Party	Candidate	Votes	%	±%
Whig	Ross Donnelly Mangles	242	30.2	+17.0
Whig	Charles Baring Wall	221	27.6	+14.4
Conservative	James Yorke Scarlett	177	22.1	−9.3
Conservative	Henry Currie	161	20.1	−22.0
Majority		44	5.5	N/A
Turnout		401 (est)	82.5 (est)	+0.1
Registered electors		486		
Whig gain from Conservative		Swing	+16.3	
Whig gain from Conservative		Swing	+15.0	

=== Elections in the 1830s ===
General election 1837: Guildford (top 2 candidates elected)
Party	Candidate	Votes	%	±%
Conservative	Charles Baring Wall	252	42.1	+25.5
Conservative	James Yorke Scarlett	188	31.4	+14.8
Whig	James Mangles	159	26.5	−40.2
Majority		29	4.7	−8.2
Turnout		350	82.4	+19.5
Registered electors		425		
Conservative hold		Swing	+22.8	
Conservative gain from Whig		Swing	+17.5	

General election 1835: Guildford (top 2 candidates elected)
Party	Candidate	Votes	%	±%
Whig	James Mangles	299	46.4	−2.1
Conservative	Charles Baring Wall	214	33.2	+4.0
Whig	Robert Alfred Cloyne Austen	131	20.3	−2.1
Turnout		338	62.9	−25.7
Registered electors		537		
Majority		85	13.2	−6.1
Whig hold		Swing	−2.1	
Majority		83	12.9	+6.1
Conservative hold		Swing	+4.1	

General election 1832: Guildford (top 2 candidates elected)
Party	Candidate	Votes	%	±%
Whig	James Mangles	299	48.5	+22.0
Tory	Charles Baring Wall	180	29.2	−12.2
Whig	Charles Francis Norton	138	22.4	−9.6
Turnout		303	88.6	−4.0
Registered electors		342		
Majority		119	19.3	+16.4
Whig hold		Swing	+14.1	
Majority		42	6.8	N/A
Tory gain from Whig		Swing	−12.3	

Constituency boundaries were redrawn in time for the 1832 general election.

General election 1831: Guildford (top 2 candidates elected)
Party	Candidate	Votes	%	±%
Whig	Charles Francis Norton	99	32.0	+20.4
Whig	James Mangles	82	26.5	+14.9
Tory	George Holme Sumner	73	23.6	−8.1
Tory	Charles Baring Wall	55	17.8	−27.4
Majority		9	2.9	N/A
Turnout		162	92.6	+18.6
Registered electors		175		
Whig gain from Tory		Swing	+19.1	
Whig gain from Tory		Swing	+16.3	

General election 1830: Guildford (top 2 candidates elected)
Party	Candidate	Votes	%
Tory	Charles Baring Wall	117	45.2
Tory	George Holme Sumner	82	31.7
Whig	George Chapple Norton	60	23.2
Majority		22	8.5
Turnout		c. 130	c. 74.0
Registered electors		c. 175	
Tory hold			
Tory gain from Whig			

== See also ==
- List of parliamentary constituencies in Surrey
- List of parliamentary constituencies in the South East England (region)

== Sources ==
- Election result, 2015 (BBC)
- Election result, 2010 (BBC)
- Election result, 2005 (BBC)
- Election results, 1997 - 2001 (BBC)
- Election results, 1997 - 2001 (Election Demon)
- Election results, 1983 - 1992 (Election Demon)
- Election results, 1945 - 1979 (Political Resources)
