= George Abbotts =

English politician

Long Parliament Member for Guildford
- In office November 1640 – 1645

Short Parliament Member for Guildford
- In office April 1640 – November 1640

Personal details
- Born: 1602 Middlesex, England
- Died: 1645 (aged 42–43)
- Parent: Sir Maurice Abbot(ts) (father)
- Education: Balliol College, Oxford; Merton College, Oxford; Cambridge University

George Abbotts or Abbot (1602–1645) was an English politician who sat in the House of Commons between 1640 and 1645.

== Biography ==
Abbotts was born in Middlesex, the son of Sir Maurice Abbot(ts). He matriculated at Balliol College, Oxford on 15 October 1619, aged 17 and was awarded BA on 28 February 1622. In 1622 he became a fellow of Merton College, Oxford and was awarded M.A. on 20 May 1625. He was incorporated at Cambridge University in 1627 and was awarded B.C.L. on 16 November 1630.

In April 1640, Abbotts was elected Member of Parliament for Guildford in the Short Parliament and supported the Parliamentary (Roundhead) cause. He was re-elected MP for Guildford in the Long Parliament in November 1640 and sat until his death. In July 1641 he wanted to resign his seat, but his request was not granted.

Parliament of England
Vacant Parliament suspended since 1629	Member of Parliament for Guildford; 1640–1645; With: Sir Robert Parkhurst; Nicholas Stoughton	Not represented in Rump Parliament
