= Hascombe Court =

Estate in Hascombe, Surrey, England

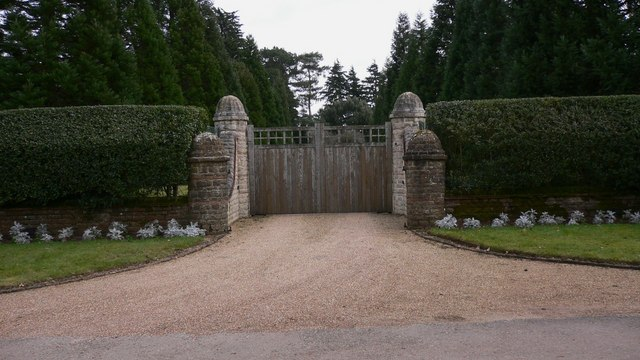
- Gateway to Hascombe Court

- Location within Surrey
- 51°9′1.54″N 0°34′56.81″W
- Location: Hascombe
- OS grid reference: SU 99288 39960

History
- Built: 1906-1907

Site notes
- Area: Surrey
- Architect: J D Coleridge

Listed Building – Grade II
- Official name: Hascombe Court including attached forecourt walls
- Designated: 15 September 2000
- Reference no.: 1384634

National Register of Historic Parks and Gardens
- Official name: Hascombe Court
- Designated: 18 September 2000
- Reference no.: 1001475

Hascombe Court is a 172-acre (70 ha) estate in Hascombe, Surrey, best known for its vast garden designed by Gertrude Jekyll. Hascombe Court is listed Grade II on the National Heritage List for England, and its gardens are also Grade II listed on the Register of Historic Parks and Gardens.

Five garden buildings at Hascombe Court built by Percy Cane between 1928 and 1929 are Grade II listed; these are the garden house at the north edge of the estate, a gazebo, a circular tennis pavilion, the former grass terrace pavilion, and the summer house.

The garage block and the garden terrace with steps, lily pond and an urn are each individually Grade II listed. The kitchen garden walls and glasshouses are also Grade II listed.

== Historical development ==
In 1906 Robert E. A. Murray, a descendant of the Duke of Atholl, employed the architect J. D. Coleridge to build him a house in a woodland clearing on a plateau above the village of Hascombe. In 1910 Murray died, and subsequently G. E. B. Kennedy bought the house. By 1912 the house remained largely surrounded by woodland, into which had been set to the north the kitchen garden, with, to the north-east, an orchard. Coleridge was a pupil of Edwin Lutyens, leading Nikolaus Pevsner in the Surrey edition of his Buildings of England series to praise Coleridge's "fine Bargate stone entrance front in his masters manner" but reserving criticism for the "sloppy garden front of half-timber".

By 1916 a further clearing had been formed to the south of the house, from which a long vista extended south into the woodland. A field to the east had been planted up as parkland, with scattered clumps of trees and singles. Kennedy died in 1921.

Gertrude Jekyll

The property was bought by Sir John Jarvis, 1st Baronet, who employed Gertrude Jekyll in 1922 to extend the garden, working with the architect C. Clare Nauheim. In 1928-9 Sir John employed Percy Cane to extend the garden further, and some of Jekyll's features appear to have been overlain by Cane's work. Cane produced a plan of around 1928, from which the names of the garden compartments have been taken and used in this description. Jarvis bought unemployed miners from the northern industrial town of Jarrow to Hascombe Court, where they built a Japanese style water and rock garden to Cane's design. Sir John Jarvis died in 1950. The house and estate were then bought by Major Claude Chapman Jacobs, a retired City ship broker who died in 1972.

== Present day ==
The property was subsequently sold but has since remained in private ownership. It was owned by the broadcaster and television presenter Chris Evans who lived there with his second wife, the actress Billie Piper. Evans renovated the property and stated in a 2000 interview that "I want to make it beautiful. This house deserves to be brought into this century. If you look at the old pictures of it, taken 75 years ago, it was a mess then. I don't want to make it all right, I want to make it fantastic". In 1999 2,418 kg (5,331 lb) of yew clippings were collected from the Hascombe Court estate by Evans's gardeners, and were given to the cancer research charity, Limehurst. The clippings were used in drug research for breast cancer. Evans sold Hascombe Court for £10 million to the Russian businessman Boris Berezovsky in 2004. The adjoining 130 acre Hascombe Court Farm was sold by Evans for £6 million to Anthea Turner and Grant Bovey in 2009.
