= William Bovill =

British politician and judge (1814–73)

The Right Honourable Sir William Bovill FRS
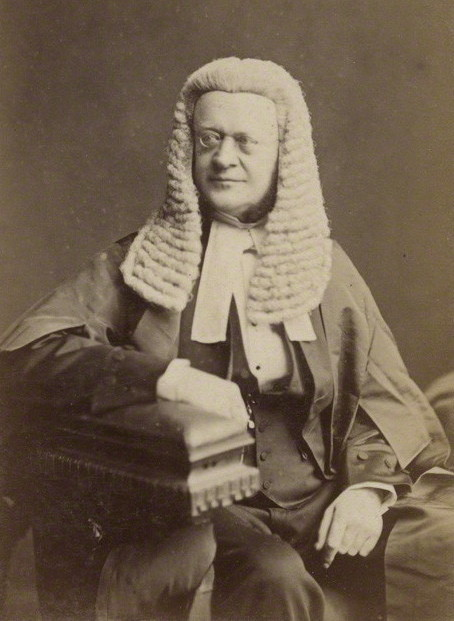
- Bovill in 1872

Chief Justice of the Common Pleas

Personal details
- Born: 26 May 1814 Allhallows, Barking
- Died: 1 November 1873 (aged 59) Kingston upon Thames

Sir William Bovill, PC, FRS (26 May 1814 – 1 November 1873) was an English lawyer, politician and judge. He served as Chief Justice of the Common Pleas between 1866 and his death in 1873.

== Background ==
Bovill was born at Allhallows, Barking, a younger son of Benjamin Bovill, of Wimbledon, London.

== Career ==
On leaving school, Bovill did not go to university but was articled to a firm of solicitors. He entered the Middle Temple and practised for a short time as a special pleader below the bar. He was called to the bar in 1841 and joined the home circuit. His special training in a solicitor's office, and its resulting connection, combined with a thorough knowledge of the details of engineering, acquired through his interest in a manufacturing firm in the east end of London, soon brought him a very extensive patent and commercial practice.

Bovill became a Queen's Counsel (QC) in 1855, and on 28 March 1857 was elected Member of Parliament (MP) for Guildford. In the House of Commons, he was very zealous for legal reform, and the Partnership Law Amendment Act 1865, which he helped to pass, is always referred to as Bovill's Act. In 1866, he was appointed Solicitor General, an office which he vacated on becoming Chief Justice of the Common Pleas in succession to Sir William Erle in November of the same year.

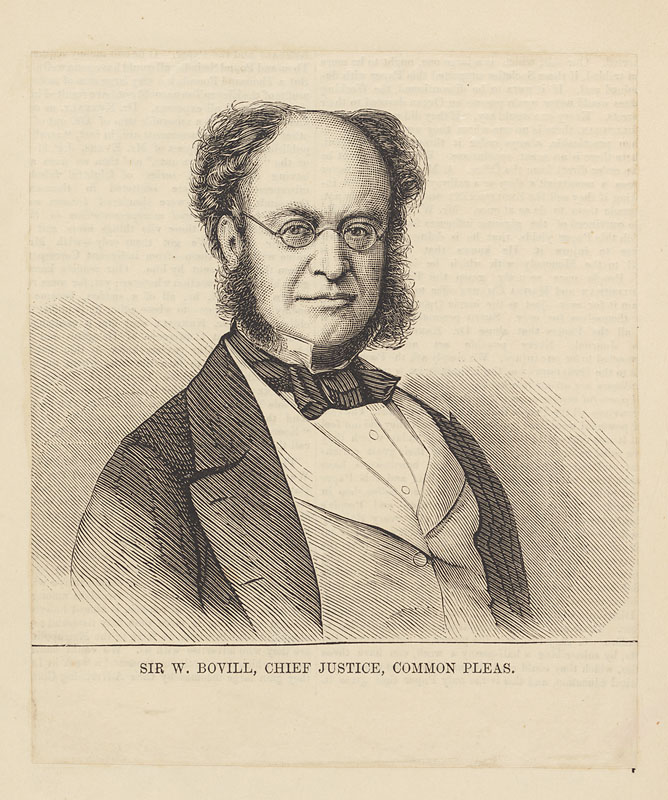

== Personal life ==
Bovill had married, in 1844, Maria Bolton, eldest daughter of John Henry Bolton of Lee Park, Blackheath. They lived firstly in London and then moved to Worplesdon, where they made their home at Worplesdon Lodge (later renamed Worplesdon Place).

He died at Kingston upon Thames on 1 November 1873. Maria, Lady Bovill died in London 21 October 1901.

== Honours and arms ==
Bovill was knighted in 1866. In May 1867 he was elected a Fellow of the Royal Society.

Coat of arms of William Bovill

Crest
A bull ram quartered Sable and Or.
Escutcheon
Quarterly Argent and Sable.
Motto
Dex Aïe

Parliament of the United Kingdom
Preceded by James Bell; Ross Donnelly Mangles	Member of Parliament for Guildford; 1857–1866; With: Ross Donnelly Mangles to 1858; Guildford Onslow from 1858	Succeeded by Richard Garth; Guildford Onslow
Legal offices
Preceded by Sir Robert Collier	Solicitor General; 1866	Succeeded by Sir John Burgess Karslake
Preceded by Sir William Erle	Chief Justice of the Common Pleas; 1866–1873	Succeeded by The Lord Coleridge
