= Robert Vinter =

English politician

Robert Vinter (fl. 1388) of Guildford, Surrey, was an English politician.

He was a member (MP) of the parliament of England for Guildford in September 1388, 1391 and September 1397.
