= Laurence Stoughton =

16th-century English politician

Sir Laurence Stoughton (1554–1615), of Stoughton, Surrey and West Stoke, Sussex, was an English politician.

He was the son of Thomas Stoughton, MP and the brother of MP, Adrian Stoughton and educated at the Inner Temple. He inherited his father's estates in 1576.

== Career ==
He was a Member (MP) of the Parliament of England for Guildford in 1572, 1584, 1586 and 1593. He was knighted by King James in 1611.

== Family ==
He married Rose, the stepdaughter of Guildford MP, William Hammond and had 11 sons and 6 daughters. Two of his sons, George Stoughton and Nicholas Stoughton, were also MPs for Guildford.
