= Robert Chesenhale =

14th-century English politician

Robert Chesenhale (died c. 1402), of Guildford, Surrey, and Artington, Surrey, was an English politician.

He was a member (MP) of the parliament of England for Guildford in January 1377, January 1380, 1381, February 1383, February 1388 and September 1397.
