= John Stoughton (disambiguation) =

John Stoughton was an English minister and historian.

John Stoughton may also refer to:

- John Stoughton (MP), English politician
- John Stoughton (priest), English clergyman
- John Stoughton Bloomfield, Australian politician
- John Stoughton Dennis, Canadian surveyor
- John Stoughton Newberry, American politician

== See also ==
- John Stourton (disambiguation)
