= Nicholas Stoughton =

English politician

Nicholas Stoughton (20 September 1592 – 4 March 1648) was an English politician who sat in the House of Commons at various times between 1624 and 1648.

He was the son of Sir Lawrence Stoughton, MP and his wife Rose Ive, the stepdaughter of William Hammond, MP. He was the brother of George Stoughton, MP. He matriculated at New College, Oxford on 30 March 1610 aged 18.

He was a student of Inner Temple in 1613. In 1624, he was elected member of parliament for Guildford. He was a justice of the peace for Surrey from 1624 to his death and was appointed High Sheriff of Surrey for 1637–38.

In December 1645 he was elected MP for Guildford as a recruiter to the Long Parliament and sat until his death in 1648.

He married twice. Firstly Bridget, the daughter of Sir John Compton of Priors Dean, Hamshire, with whom he had two sons who predeceased him and two daughters and secondly Anne, the daughter of William Evans, Mercer, of London.

Parliament of England
Preceded by Sir Robert More; John Murray	Member of Parliament for Guildford; 1624; With: Sir George More	Succeeded by Sir William Morley; Robert Parkhurst, jnr
Preceded by Sir Robert Parkhurst; George Abbotts	Member of Parliament for Guildford; 1645–1648; With: Sir Robert Parkhurst	Succeeded by Sir Robert Parkhurst
