= Margaret Sharp, Baroness Sharp of Guildford =

British Baroness (born 1938)

The Right Honourable The Baroness Sharp of Guildford
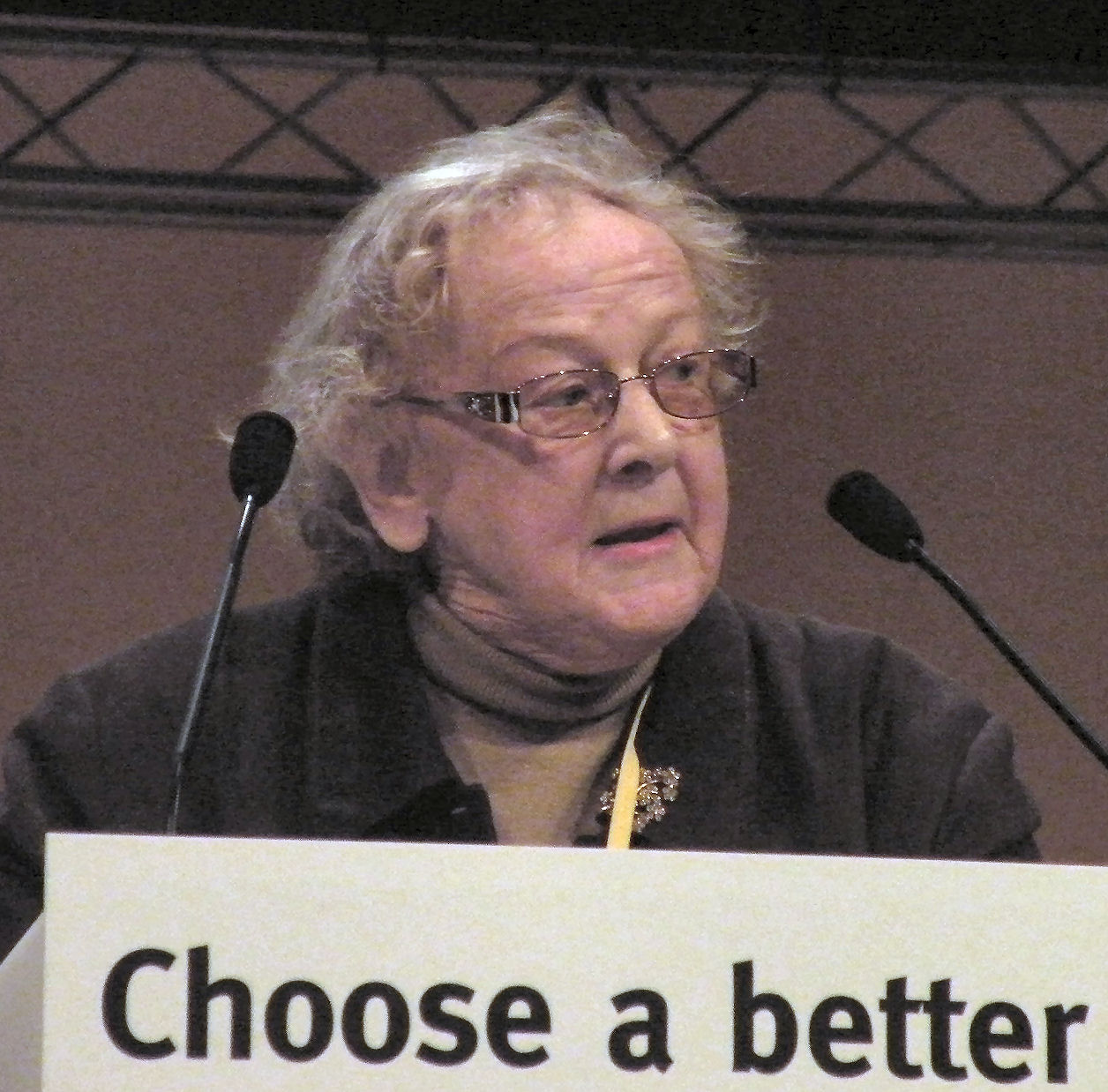

Member of the House of Lords
- Lord Temporal
- Life peerage 1 August 1998 – 31 July 2016

Personal details
- Born: 21 November 1938 (age 87)
- Party: Liberal Democrats
- Spouse: Thomas Sharp
- Education: Newnham College, Cambridge

Margaret Lucy Sharp, Baroness Sharp of Guildford (born 21 November 1938) is a former member of the House of Lords of the United Kingdom. She sat as a Liberal Democrat.

== Early life ==
She is the daughter of Osmund and Sydney Hailstone. She was educated at Tonbridge Grammar School and Newnham College, Cambridge where she gained a BA in 1960.

== Career ==
She had a successful career as an economist before entering the House of Lords. Sharp's work encompassed both academic and public service, starting in the civil service, followed by a long spell at the London School of Economics (LSE), a short spell back in public service with the National Economic Development Office in the late 1970s and, since the early 1980s, with the Science Policy Research Unit (SPRU) at the University of Sussex. She retired from the University of Sussex in 1999 but retains a visiting fellowship.

Sharp's political career began in the early 1980s when she joined the newly formed Social Democratic Party (SDP) and was selected to stand in Guildford in the 1983 general election. She fought three further elections in Guildford for the SDP and then the Liberal Democrats, gradually squeezing a 20,000 majority down to 4,500 and preparing the way for Liberal Democrat Sue Doughty's victory in the 2001 election.

On the national scene she has played an active part in policy making, chairing a number of policy working groups and for several years being vice-chair to Paddy Ashdown on the Party's main policy committee.

As leader of higher and further education policy group, who produced the paper 'Quality, Diversity and Choice' which is now party policy, Sharp was widely attributed as masterminding the Liberal Democrat's rejection of top-up fees, which contributed to the party's success in taking a number of university seats at the 2005 general election.

She is a member of the Advisory Council for the Campaign for Science and Engineering.

== House of Lords ==
She was created a Life peer as Baroness Sharp of Guildford, of Guildford in the County of Surrey on 1 August 1998, and spoke for her party on issues of education, science, and technology in the House of Lords. She retired from the House on 31 July 2016.

== Personal life ==
She married Thomas Sharp CBE in 1962. He has been a Lib Dem councillor on Surrey County Council and Guildford Borough Council.
