= Robert Hornmede =

English politician

Robert Hornmede (died 1409), of Guildford, Surrey, was an English politician.

He was a member (MP) of the parliament of England for Guildford in 1401. Nothing is recorded of his family or any other offices he may have held.
