= James Mangles (MP) =

English merchant and politician (1768–1838)

James Mangles (27 July 1768 – 25 September 1838) was an English merchant and politician.

== Life and career ==
The son of Robert Mangles, a ship chandler in Wapping, he went into his father's business together with his brother John. He was also a shipowner in partnership with his brothers John (1760–1837), Timothy (1729–1795) and Robert (1732–1788). They owned at least four vessels that were employed in the South Sea whale fishery.

Mangles was Member of Parliament for Guildford from 1831 to 1837. During the 1830s he bought Down Place, Surrey, from Edward Turnour, 3rd Earl Winterton. He became a director of the East India Company and served as High Sheriff of Surrey (1808–1809).

== Family ==
Mangles married Mary Hughes of Guildford. There were six sons and six daughters of the marriage, with ten surviving to adulthood.

- The eldest, Caroline, born 1792, married in 1815 the Rev. Arthur Onslow, as his second wife.
- The eldest son Frederick (1794–1869) married Marion or Marian Scott, daughter of George Scott of Ravenscourt; of Pendell Court, Surrey
- Pilgrim (1795–1828), director of the East India Company
- Charles Edward (1798–1874) married Rose Newcomb
- Emily (1799–1826) married in 1825 Henry Waitby
- Ross Donnelly (1801–1877) married in 1830 Harriet Newcomb
- Jane (1803–1824)
- Ellen (1807–1874) married in 1823 James Stirling.
- Albert (1809–1865) married in 1833 Georgiana Scott, daughter of George Scott of Ravenscourt.
- Hamilla (born 1812) married in 1833 William Preston R.N.

John Mangles (1760–1837), brother of James Mangles (1762–1838), was father of James Mangles R.N.

== Notes ==
Parliament of the United Kingdom
Preceded by Charles Baring Wall; George Holme Sumner	Member of Parliament for Guildford; 1831–1837; With: Charles Francis Norton 1831–1832; Charles Baring Wall 1832–1834	Succeeded by Charles Baring Wall; James Yorke Scarlett
