= Albert Edward Martin =

British politician

Albert Edward Martin (13 December 1876 – 26 July 1936) was an English merchant and Liberal Party, later Conservative politician.

== Date of birth ==
According to the source, Leigh Rayment's Peerage Page, Martin was born in 1875 but Who was Who gives his date of birth as 1876. According to the brief obituary in The Times newspaper, Martin was aged 59 years when he died, which supports the report of his date of birth as 1876. Martin was born on 13 December 1876 at the Falmouth House pub, in Maryland Road, Stratford, Essex. He was baptised at St Dunstans and All Saints church, Stepney, Middlesex, on 4 February 1876.

== Family ==
Martin married Edith Savory in 1909 and they had a son and two daughters. His father was William Martin (1826-1887) who was a licensed victualler and his mother was Elizabeth Ann Martin (nee Harvey) (1851-1913).

== Career ==
Martin was a successful merchant. He was head of a firm in Southend-on-Sea in Essex. He was also a member of the Territorial Army, rising to the rank of Honorary Colonel of the 52nd Anti-Aircraft Brigade, (T.A) and he was responsible for raising the 156th Battery. Martin also served as a Justice of the Peace.

== Politics ==
=== Parliamentary candidate, 1918 ===
Martin was selected as Liberal candidate for Romford in Essex to fight the 1918 general election in succession to the sitting Liberal MP, Sir John Bethell who had transferred to the nearby seat of East Ham North. Both Martin and Bethell were awarded the Coalition coupon for the election and both were returned. In Romford, Martin faced a Labour opponent and one from the left-wing National Socialist Party. In the absence of a Conservative, with the Labour vote split and with the endorsement of the coupon, Martin won the seat comfortably with a majority of 5,256 votes.

=== 1922 ===
At the 1922 general election Martin stood as a National Liberal, that is to say as a supporter of outgoing Prime Minister David Lloyd George of whose Coalition government he had been a supporter. Again without a Conservative opponent, Martin was involved in a straight fight against Labour. He held his seat by a majority of 4,103 votes.

=== 1923 ===
Martin's years of working with the Conservatives in Parliament and presumably at a local level, must have played a part in his decision in 1923 to leave the Liberals and join the Tories. As the 1923 general election approached Martin was adopted by the Romford Conservatives as their candidate for the contest. However this move was resented by some in the constituency and this bitterness could have proved problematic for Martin's election campaign. In the event the potential difficulties never presented themselves as Martin withdrew from the fray on the grounds that his health had broken down. The Conservatives selected another candidate Charles Rhys to represent them and Rhys went on to win the seat, holding it until 1929.

=== Local politics ===
Martin continued to enjoy a political career at local government level. He was charter mayor of the new Municipal Borough of Barking in 1931 and was re-elected mayor in November 1932. He was sometime chairman of Barking Education Committee and of the Food Control Committee. He was also an alderman of the Borough.

== Death ==
Martin died at his home, Oak Hall, The Leas, Westcliff-on-Sea, Essex, on 26 July 1936.

== Honours ==
In July 1933, Martin was given the Freedom of the Borough of Southend-on-Sea.

Parliament of the United Kingdom
Preceded by Sir John Bethell	Member of Parliament for Romford; 1918 – 1923	Succeeded by Charles Rhys
Civic offices
Preceded by New position	Mayor of Barking; 1931–1934	Succeeded by Alfred George Edwards
