= Henry Marlborough =

English politician

Henry Marlborough (fl. 1383–1386) was an English politician.

He was a member (MP) of the parliament of England for Guildford in November 1383 and 1386. Beyond this, nothing further is recorded of him.
