= John Hipperon =

English politician and lawyer

John Hipperon (died 1440 or after), of Guildford, Surrey, was an English politician and lawyer.

He was a Member (MP) of the Parliament of England for Guildford in March 1416 and 1422.
