= Charles Rhys, 8th Baron Dynevor =

British politician (1899–1962)

The Right Honourable The Lord Dynevor CBE DL

Member of Parliament for Guildford
- In office 1931–1935
- Preceded by: Sir Henry Buckingham
- Succeeded by: Sir John Jarvis

Member of Parliament for Romford
- In office 1923–1929
- Preceded by: Albert Edward Martin
- Succeeded by: Henry Thomas Muggeridge

Parliamentary Private Secretary to the Prime Minister
- In office 1927–1929
- Prime Minister: Stanley Baldwin
- Preceded by: Sir Sidney Herbert, 1st Baronet
- Succeeded by: Lauchlan MacNeill Weir

Personal details
- Born: Charles Arthur Uryan Rhys; 21 September 1899
- Died: 15 December 1962 (aged 63)
- Party: Conservative
- Spouse: Hope Mary Woodbine (m. 1934)
- Relatives: Walter Rice, 7th Baron Dynevor; Richard Rhys, 9th Baron Dynevor
- Education: Eton College
- Alma mater: Royal Military College, Sandhurst

Military service
- Allegiance: United Kingdom
- Branch/service: British Army
- Rank: Lieutenant
- Unit: Grenadier Guards

Charles Arthur Uryan Rhys, 8th Baron Dynevor CBE (21 September 1899 – 15 December 1962), was a British peer and politician. He was the son of Walter FitzUryan Rice, 7th Baron Dynevor.

Rhys was educated at Eton and the Royal Military College, Sandhurst, and was commissioned into the Grenadier Guards. In 1919 he was awarded the Order of St. Anne of Russia. He resigned his commission as a Lieutenant in 1920. He was appointed deputy lieutenant for Carmarthenshire in 1925 and a justice of the peace in 1931.

Rhys served as a Conservative Member of Parliament for Romford from 1923 until 1929, when defeated by Labour's H.T. Muggeridge. He returned to the House of Commons two years later, when he was elected at an unopposed by-election in 1931 as MP for Guildford, holding the seat until he stood down at the 1935 United Kingdom general election. He was Parliamentary Private Secretary to Stanley Baldwin from 1927 to 1929.

On 29 September 1934 he married Hope Mary Woodbine who had formerly been the wife of Captain Arthur Granville Soames, OBE, of the Coldstream Guards.

Rhys served as Deputy Chairman of the Sun Insurance Company and as Chairman of the Cities of London and Westminster Conservative Association from 1948 until 1960. He was also the Governor of the National Museum of Wales.

From 1950 until 1962 Rhys was President of the University College of South Wales and Monmouthshire, (now called Cardiff University).

When he died at the age of 63, death duties previously incurred by the 7th Baron had not been paid, placing an intolerable financial burden on the next in line of descent, his son Richard Charles Uryan Rhys, 9th Baron Dynevor.

Coat of arms of Charles Rhys, 8th Baron Dynevor
Crest A raven Sable. Escutcheon Argent a chevron between three ravens Sable. Supporters Dexter a griffin per fess Or and Argent wings addorsed and inverted tail between the legs, sinister a talbot Argent collared flory counterflory Gules ears Ermine and charged on the shoulder with a trefoil slipped Vert. Motto Secret Et Hardi (Secret And Bold))

Parliament of the United Kingdom
Preceded by Arthur Evans	Baby of the House; 1923–1924	Succeeded by Hugh Lucas-Tooth
Preceded by Albert Edward Martin	Member of Parliament for Romford; 1923–1929	Succeeded by Henry Thomas Muggeridge
Preceded by Sir Henry Buckingham	Member of Parliament for Guildford; 1931–1935	Succeeded by Sir John Jarvis
Government offices
Preceded by Sir Sidney Herbert	Parliamentary Private Secretary to the Prime Minister; 1927–1929	Succeeded by Lauchlan MacNeill Weir
Peerage of Great Britain
Preceded by Walter Rice	Baron Dynevor; 1956–1962	Succeeded by Richard Rhys
