= Colas =

Colas may refer to:

People

- Elena Colas (born 2010), French artistic gymnast
- Emily Colas, American author
- Erwan Colas (born 1997), French footballer
- Eva Colas (born 1996), French beauty pageant titleholder and model
- Fabrice Colas (born 1964), French track cyclist
- Henry Colas (disambiguation), name of multiple people
- Oscar Colás (born 1998), Cuban baseball player
- Paul Colas (1880–1972), French sports shooter
- Samantha Colas (born 1992), Haitian beauty pageant contestant and presenter

Business and organisations

- Colas Group, a multi-national civil engineering company based in France
  - Colas Rail, its rail freight subsidiary
  - Colas Ltd, a British subsidiary

== See also ==
- Cola
