= Denzil Onslow (Conservative politician) =

British politician

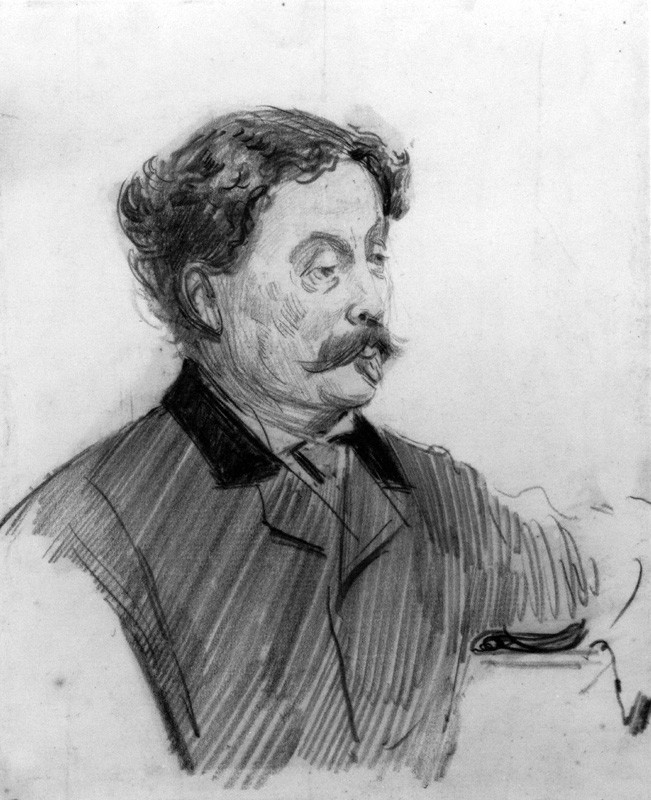
Denzil Roberts Onslow by Sydney Prior Hall

Denzil Roberts Onslow (15 June 1839 – 21 March 1908) was an English Conservative Party politician who sat in the House of Commons from 1874 to 1885. He played first-class cricket for Cambridge University from 1859 to 1861, Sussex from 1860 to 1869 and for Marylebone Cricket Club (MCC) from 1861 to 1873.

Onslow was born at Chittore, Madras, India, the second son of Thomas Onslow of the Madras Civil Service and his wife Elizabeth Sarah Roberts, daughter of Charles Roberts of Madras. He was the grandson of Denzil Onslow who was also a cricketer. He was educated at Brighton College where he played cricket in the first team between 1855 and 1858 and started playing for Gentlemen of Sussex. In 1858, he entered Trinity College, Cambridge. Onslow played cricket for Cambridge University in 1859 and took part in the Varsity matches in 1860 and 1861. He made his debut for Sussex in 1860 and played for MCC against Middlesex in 1861.

In 1862 Onslow accompanied Sir Charles Trevelyan to India as private secretary when Trevelyan became Indian Finance Minister. Onslow remained with his successor William Nathaniel Massey who was in post from 1865 to 1868. Onslow then became secretary to his successor Sir Richard Temple. Onslow returned from India in 1869 and played cricket for MCC and Sussex for one season. He also played for Gentlemen of Sussex.

Onslow was a right hand batsman and played 40 innings in 23 first-class matches with an average of 10.70 and a top score of 53. He was a right-arm fast bowler and took 20 wickets at an average of 18.35 and a best performance of six wickets in an innings.

At the 1874 general election Onslow was elected as the Member of Parliament (MP) for the borough of Guildford. In 1879 he played cricket for the House of Commons as well as one game for MCC. He was re-elected in 1880, but when the narrow-area parliamentary borough of Guildford was abolished in 1885 in favour of a county division of the same name, St John Brodrick won the nomination and he stood instead in the Poplar division of Tower Hamlets, where Henry Green (Lib) defeated him by a margin of almost two-to-one.

Onslow married Clara Louisa Scott, daughter of James Scott of Tunbridge Wells on 2 August 1871. They had two daughters, Clara and Geraldine. In the England Wales 1881 Census, Denzil Onslow is listed as the Head of the household with the family living in Wanborough, Surrey. By the 1891 Census, Clara Onslow is listed as the Head of the household, living with her two daughters in Edmonton and in the 1901 Census, in Hackney, London. Denzil Onslow is listed in the 1901 Census as being a boarder in St James, Westminster. Geraldine Onslow married Rev'd William McNeill Carleton and went as missionaries to South Africa before the 1901 Census took place. Onslow's grandson, Denzil Onslow-Carleton, flew in the Royal Flying Corp during World War I and later went on to play rugby for Natal.

Onslow died at Westminster at the age of 68.

Parliament of the United Kingdom
Preceded by Guildford Onslow	Member of Parliament for Guildford; 1874 – 1885	Succeeded by St John Brodrick
