= Henry Buckingham (politician) =

British politician

Buckingham in 1930.

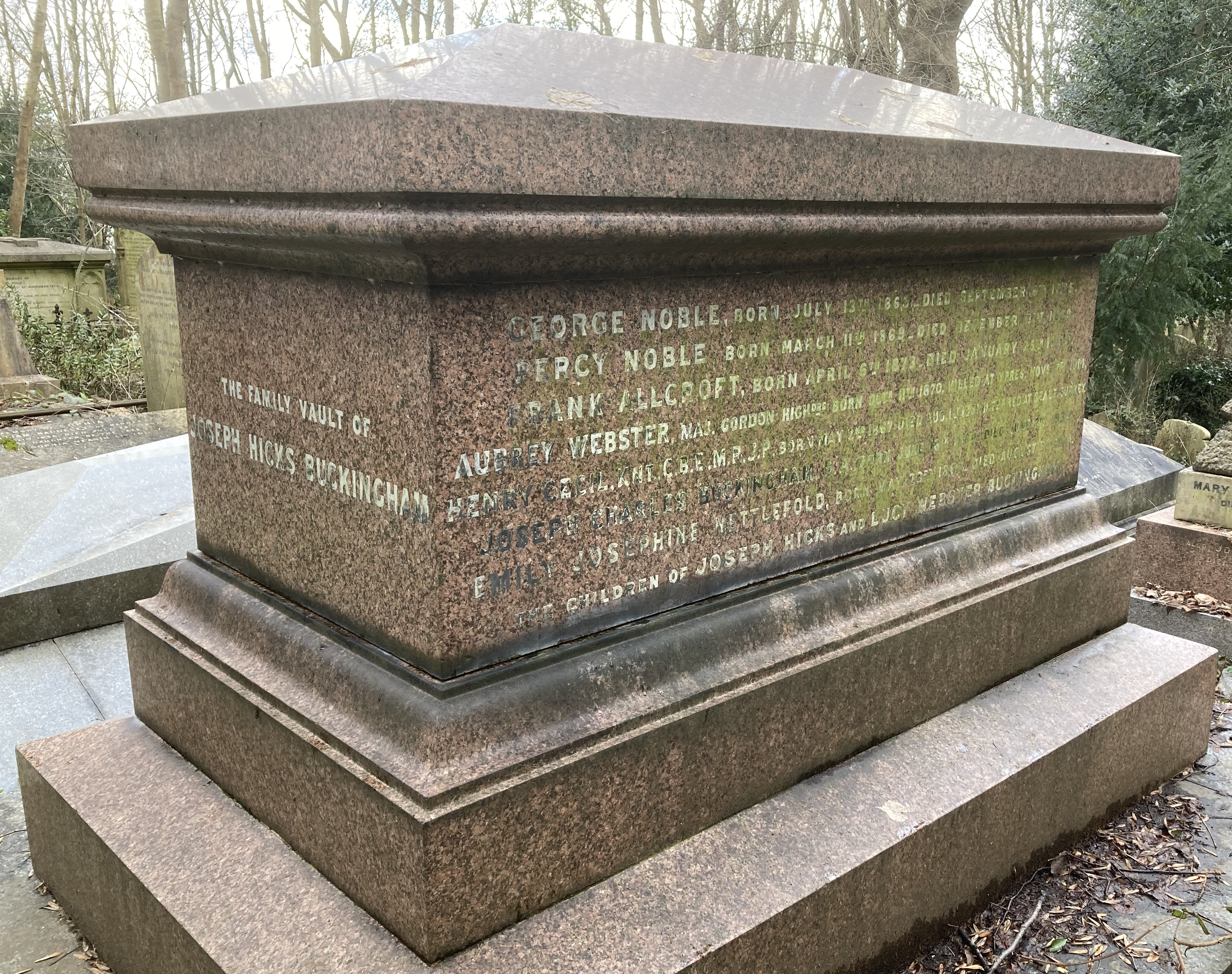
Buckingham family vault in Highgate Cemetery (west side)

Sir Henry Cecil Buckingham CBE (2 May 1867 – 1 August 1931) was a Conservative Party politician in the United Kingdom.

== Biography ==
He was educated at Harrow School. He was elected at the 1922 general election as member of parliament (MP) for the Guildford constituency in Surrey, and held the seat in three further general elections.

He was knighted in 1911, and awarded a CBE in 1920 for his work as a member of the City of London Advisory Committee of the Ministry of National Service.

He died in office in 1931 aged 64 and is buried in the Buckingham family vault in Highgate Cemetery (west side).

Parliament of the United Kingdom
| Preceded by Edgar Horne | Member of Parliament for Guildford; 1922–1931 | Succeeded by Charles Rhys |
