= John Cross (fl. 1402) =

English politician

John Cross (fl. 1402) of Guildford, Surrey, was an English politician. He was a member (MP) of the parliament of England for Guildford in 1402.
