= Guildford Onslow =

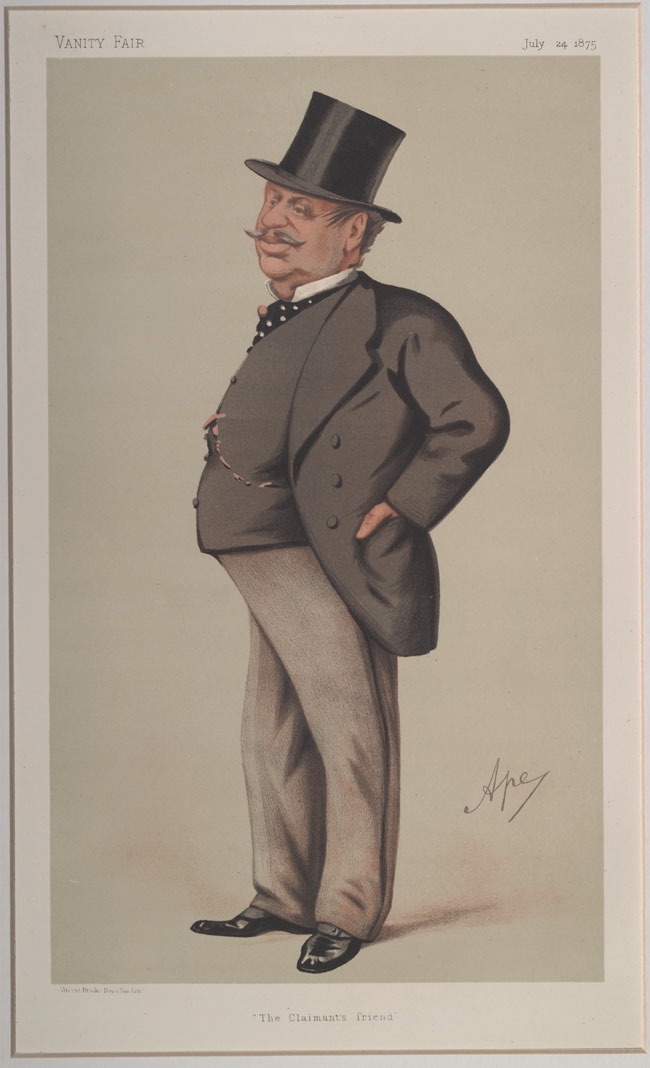
"The Claimant's Friend". Caricature by "Ape" (Carlo Pellegrini) published in Vanity Fair in 1875.

Guildford James Hillier Mainwaring-Ellerker-Onslow (29 March 1814 – 20 August 1882) was an English Liberal Party politician who sat in the House of Commons from 1858 to 1874.

Guildford Onslow was the second of five sons of Colonel Hon. Thomas Cranley Onslow, whose father in turn was a wealthy late-18th-century British royal-family friend and politician, Thomas Onslow, 2nd Earl of Onslow.

His flamboyant name – Guildford – is the county town of the county of Surrey where his family owned land and businesses – was bolstered by the wealth of the father of his mother Susannah, Nathaniel Hillier, who owned the estate of Stoke Park House, Stoke-next-Guildford, Surrey. His father started a relatively briefly second-ranking branch of the Earl of Onslow's family, the land owning and land-developing heirs of much of the land of the Earls of Surrey which in 1870 became the senior branch of the family on the accession to the earldom of Guildford Onslow's nephew.

He was educated at Eton College and joined his father's regiment, the Scots Fusilier Guards. He reached the rank of captain and also served in the 11th Regiment of Foot. He was a deputy lieutenant and J.P. for Lincolnshire and the East Riding of Yorkshire.

In October 1858, Onslow was elected at a by-election as one of the two Members of Parliament (MP) for Guildford in Surrey. He was returned at the next three general elections, holding the seat when Guildford's parliamentary representation was reduced to one seat at the 1868 general election, but at the 1874 general election he lost the seat to the Conservative Party candidate, his sixth cousin Denzil Onslow.

In 1861 he assumed by Royal Licence the additional surnames of Mainwaring and Ellerker.

Onslow died at the age of 68.

Onslow married a cousin, Rosa Anne Onslow, daughter of General Denzil Onslow of Staughton House, Great Staughton, Huntingdonshire (since 1974 Cambridgeshire).

Parliament of the United Kingdom
Preceded by Ross Donnelly Mangles; William Bovill	Member of Parliament for Guildford; 1858–1874; With: William Bovill until 1866; Richard Garth 1866–1868	Succeeded by Denzil Onslow
