= William Walsh (Guildford MP) =

Member of the Parliament of England

William Walsh (fl. 1417) was an English politician and landowner.

He was a Member (MP) of the Parliament of England for Guildford in 1417. He had died by the 1460s, when his son's widow, Joan, was involved in a dispute over the considerable property inherited from Walsh.
