= John Stourton =

John Stourton may refer to:

- John Stourton (died 1438), MP for Somerset
- John Stourton, 1st Baron Stourton (1400–1462), English soldier and politician
- John Stourton, 3rd Baron Stourton (c1454–1485), English peer
- John Stourton, 9th Baron Stourton (1553–1588), English peer
- John Stourton (politician) (1899–1992), British Member of Parliament (1931–1945)

== See also ==
- John Stoughton (disambiguation)
