= George Stoughton =

English politician

- Born: 1581; Stoughton, England
- Died: 25 January 1624 (aged 42–43); Stoughton, England
- Occupation: Politician

George Stoughton (1581 – 25 January 1624), of Stoughton, near Guildford, Surrey, was an English politician.

He was the son of Lawrence Stoughton, MP and his wife Rose Ive, the stepdaughter of William Hammond, MP. He was the brother of Nicholas Stoughton, MP.

He was elected in 1614 a Member (MP) of the Parliament of England both for Guildford and for Newtown, Isle of Wight, choosing to sit for Guildford.
