= Thomas Waller (fl. 1421–1435) =

English politician

Thomas Waller (fl. 1421–1435) of Guildford, Surrey, was an English politician who was a Member (MP) of the Parliament of England for Guildford in May 1421, December 1421 and 1435.

Waller was married to a woman named Joan.
