= John Greig (mathematician) =

English mathematician

John Greig (1759–1819) was an English mathematician. He died at Somers Town, London, on 19 January 1819, aged 60.

== Works ==
He taught mathematics and wrote:

- The Young Lady's Guide to Arithmetic, London, 1798; many editions, the last in 1864.
- Introduction to the Use of the Globes, 1805; three editions.
- A New Introduction to Arithmetic, London, 1805.
- A System of Astronomy on the simple plan of Geography, London, 1810.
- Astrography, or the Heavens displayed, London, 1810.
- The World displayed, or the Characteristic Features of Nature and Art, London, 1810.
