= William Stoughton =

William Stoughton may refer to:

- William Stoughton (judge) (1631–1701), judge in charge of the Salem witch trials
- William Stoughton (English constitutionalist) (fl. 1585), a member of parliament who promoted classical republicanism
- William L. Stoughton (1827–1888), American politician from the state of Michigan

== See also ==
- William Staughton (died 1829), Baptist clergyman
