= John Stoughton (MP) =

English politician

John Stoughton (died 1422 or after), of Guildford, Surrey, was an English politician.

He was a Member (MP) of the Parliament of England for Guildford in 1419. He was the son of John Stoughton, and the father is the one named regularly in other records – nothing further is known of the MP. The Stoughton family represented Guildford many times.
