= Thomas Palmer (died 1544) =

English politician

Sir Thomas Palmer (by 1498 – 1544) was an English politician. He sat as MP for Guildford in 1529.

He also served as overseer of petty customs in London in August 1519; surveyor of Henley-in-Arden in June 1521; usher, receipt of the Exchequer and custodian of the Star Chamber in July 1526.

He was probably the third son of John Palmer of Angmering Sussex by Isabel, the daughter and heiress of Edward Bitton of Sussex. He was knighted by 1522.
