= Thomas Palmer (1542–1616) =

English politician

Member of Parliament for Sussex
- In office 1571–1571
- In office 1589–1589

Personal details
- Born: October 1542
- Died: by 1616
- Spouse(s): Mary Palmer; Alice
- Children: 8
- Education: Gray's Inn

Thomas Palmer (1542 - by 1616), of Angmering, Sussex and Blackwall, Middlesex was an English politician. He sat in Parliament for Sussex in 1571 and 1589 and also served as Justice of the Peace, sheriff of Surrey and Sussex and deputy lieutenant of Sussex.

Palmer was born in October 1542, the second son of John Palmer and the first son of Palmer's second wife, Mary, the daughter of William Sandys. He may have attended Gray's Inn. Palmer married Mary, the daughter of Sir Thomas Palmer, with whom he had eight children. He later married Alice.

Palmer was knighted in 1573. He died by 1616.
