= Percy Stephen Cane =

- Born: 1881; Essex, England
- Died: 1976 (aged 94–95)
- Occupations: Garden designer, writer

Percival Stephen Cane (1881–1976) was an English garden designer and writer.

== Biography ==
Cane was born and educated in Essex, studying horticulture and architecture. He designed scores of gardens over a long and distinguished career, and won frequent medals for his gardens at the Chelsea Flower Show. As a writer, he published four books on gardening, and owned and published two horticulture magazines. His gardens were firmly in the Arts and Crafts style, and he was a particular admirer of Harold Peto's work.

== Selected gardens ==
Cane began designing gardens around 1919 and within a decade he had become one of the most sought-after designers of his day. His gardens range from the grounds of the Jubilee Palace of Haile Selassie, the Emperor of Ethiopia, in Addis Ababa, to a tiny town garden in Taptonville Road, Sheffield. Other commissions included:

- Caythorpe Court in Lincolnshire for Mrs Elma Yerburgh
- Ivy House, Hampstead, for Anna Pavlova in 1926
- Llannerch Hall St Asaph, North Wales, 1927–29
- Hascombe Court, Godalming, 1928–29
- Boden's Rise, Ascot, in 1929
- the King's House, Burhill in 1935 for the Royal Warrant Holders' Association
- the grounds of the British Pavilion at the 1939 New York World's Fair
- Dartington Hall for Leonard and Dorothy Elmhirst, from 1945 to 1971
- Hungerdown House, Seagry, Wiltshire, 1945–46
- Seales Court, Seagry, Wiltshire, 1957
- Falkland Palace, Fife from 1946
- Westfields, Oakley, Bedfordshire, 1953–64
- Sutton Park, Yorkshire in 1962
- Mellerstain House, Scottish borders
- Moundsmere Manor, Basingstoke
- Sulgrave Manor, Oxfordshire

== Awards and designations ==
Cane's contributions to important gardens in England are noted in nine entries in the Historic England Register of Historic Parks and Gardens of special historic interest in England, which aims to "celebrate designed landscapes of note." They are: the 1927 terrace on the hilltop at St Ann's Hill in Chertsey; his embellishments and extensions in the late 1920s to designs by Gertrude Jekyll at Hascombe Court in Godalming; the gardens at Seven Stones House in Kent; advice on the gardens at Ditchingham Hall in Norfolk; 1930s developments to the gardens at Woburn Abbey, Bedfordshire; formal terraced gardens from the 1930s (no longer extant) at Stoneleigh Abbey, Warwickshire; the 1940s Priory gardens at Hedsor House, Buckinghamshire; the tiltyard, hydrangea walk, glade, stone bastion, monumental flight of steps, and other features at Dartington Hall, Devon; and formal terraced gardens installed in 1960 at Sharpham House, Devon.

Two gardens wholly or partly designed by Cane in Scotland are designated "of national importance" and are thus included on the Historic Scotland Inventory of Gardens and Designed Landscapes. His work at Falkland Palace in the late 1940s "gives Falkland Palace gardens outstanding value as a Work of Art." The river garden he designed for Monteviot, Jedburgh, in the 1960s contributes to the garden's designation as "outstanding." In addition, the gardens designed by Cane are mentioned in the Statement of Special Interest for the listed building at Ardencraig, Rothesay.

Cane exhibited show gardens at the Royal Horticultural Society's Chelsea Flower Show over a number of years, winning eight gold medals (in 1936, 1937, 1938, 1947, 1948, 1949, 1951 and 1952) and three silver-gilt (1934, 1935 and 1950). In 1963 he was awarded the RHS's Veitch Memorial Medal, an international prize awarded to "persons of any nationality who have made an outstanding contribution to the advancement of the art, science or practice of horticulture." His particular award was for his "most beneficial influence" on garden design and horticulture.

== Selected writings ==
Cane published four books on horticulture during his career:

- Modern Gardens British and Foreign, Special Winter Number of "The Studio", 1926–27, London : The Studio, 1927.
- Garden design of to-day, London : Methuen, 1934.
- The Earth Is My Canvas, London : Methuen, 1956.
- The creative art of garden design, London : Country Life, 1967.

He also owned and edited the horticultural magazines My Garden, Illustrated (1918–20) and Garden Design (1930–38).

A full-length biography, Percy Cane, Garden Designer, was written by Ronald Webber and published in 1975.

== Gallery ==
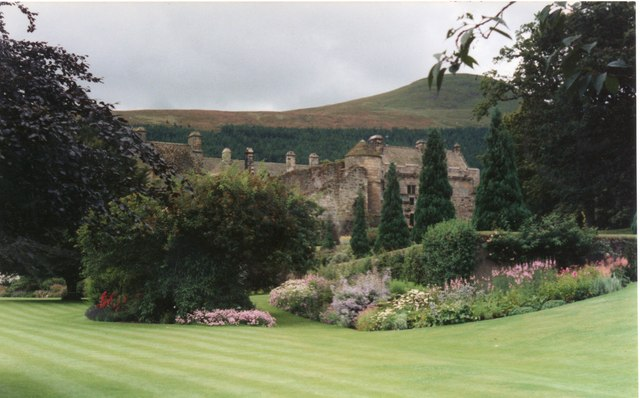
Falkland Palace Garden

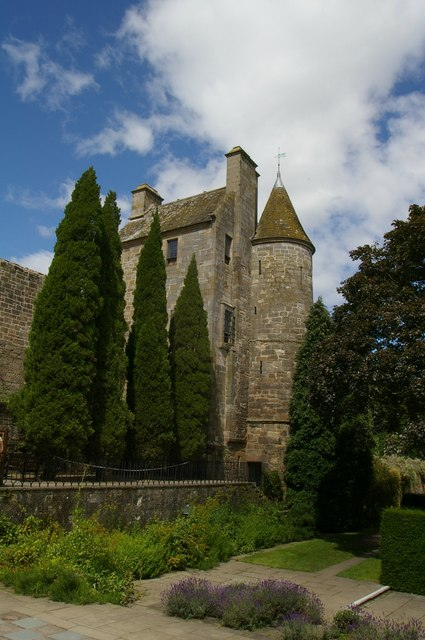
Falkland Palace Garden

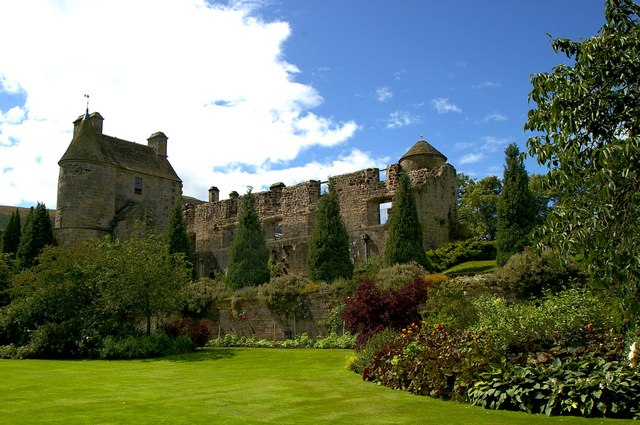
Falkland Palace Garden

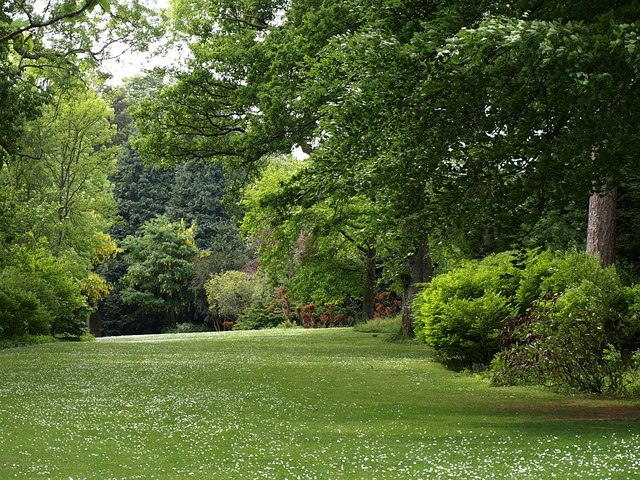
The Glade, Dartington Hall Gardens

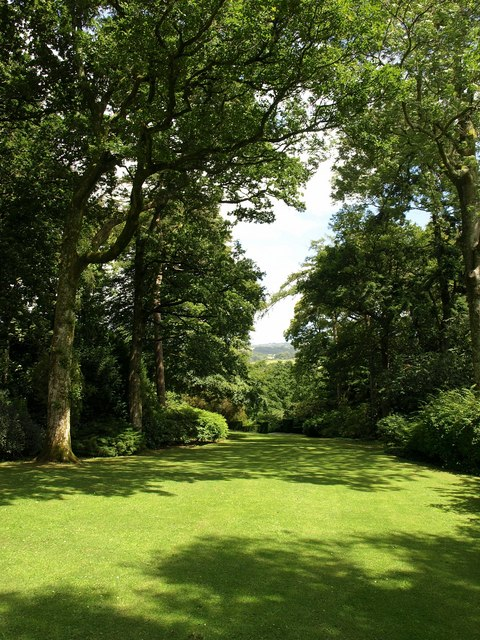
The Glade, Dartington Hall Gardens

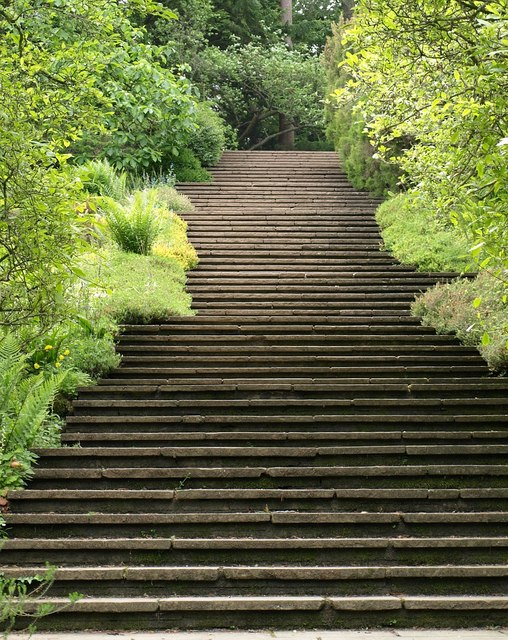
Flight of Steps, Dartington Hall Gardens

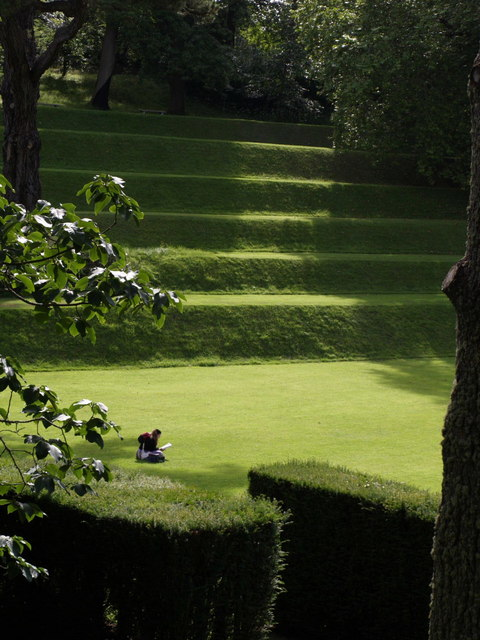
The Tiltyard, Dartington Hall Gardens

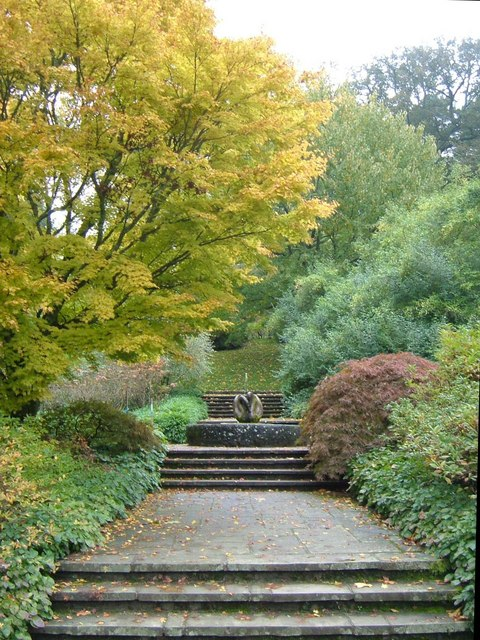
Azalea Dell, Dartington Hall Gardens

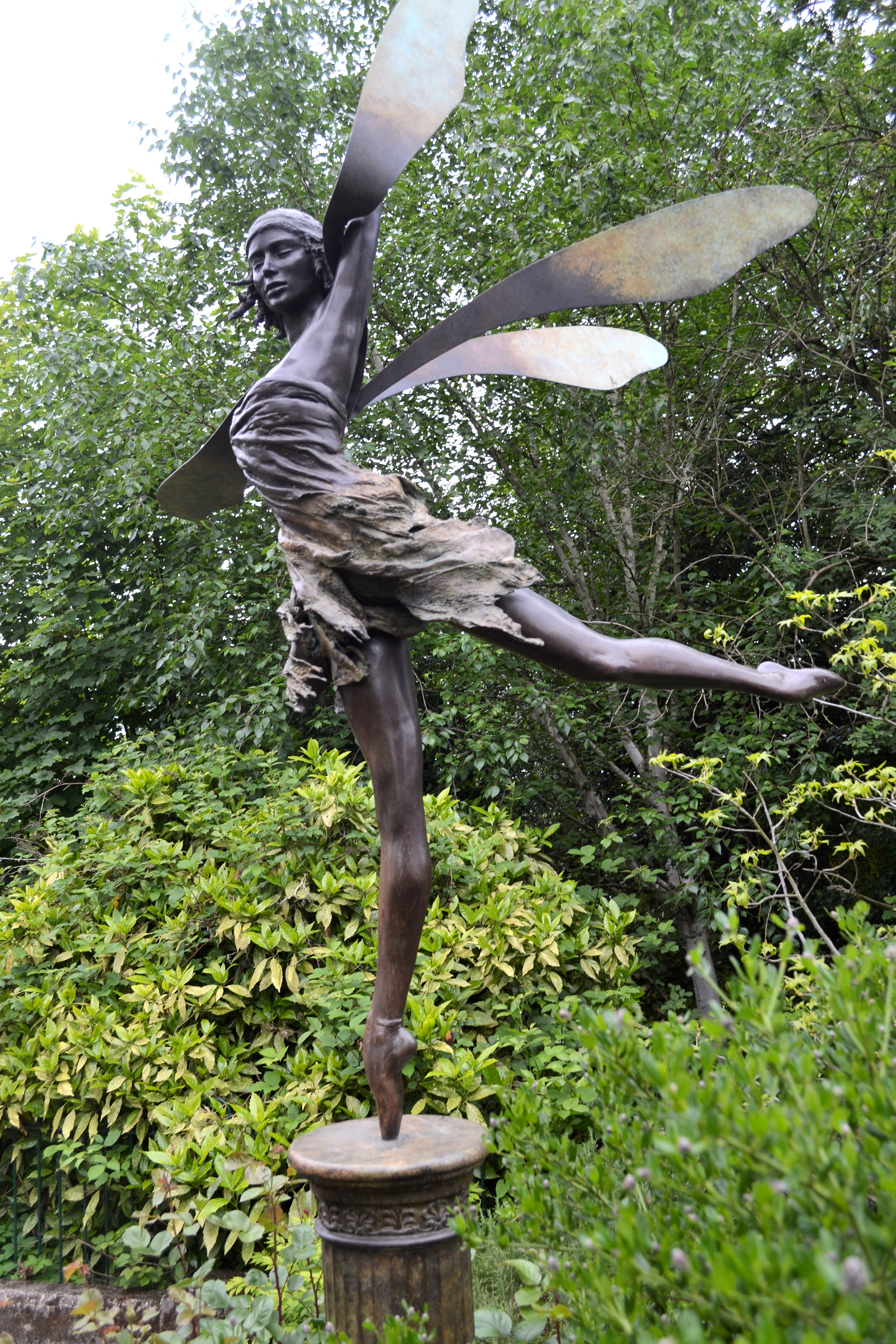
A Paulin statue in the garden at Ivy House

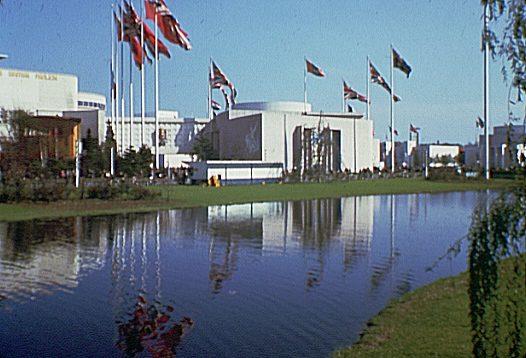
British Pavilion at the 1939 New York World's Fair

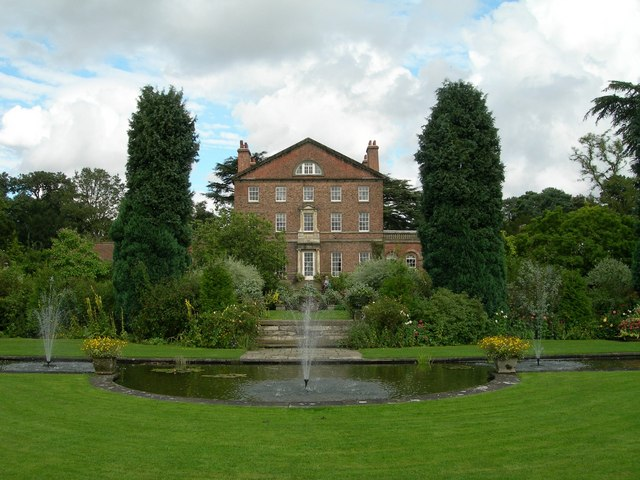
Sutton Park, Yorkshire

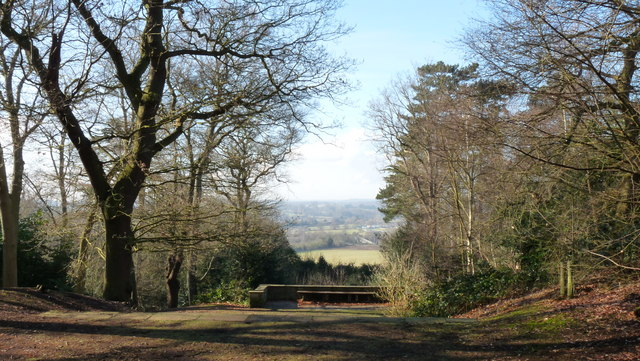
St Ann's Hill, Chertsey

== See also ==
- English gardeners
- British garden writers
- Landscape design history
