= Robert Hull (MP) =

English politician

Robert Hull (fl. 1407) of Down Place, Surrey, was an English politician.

He married 'Elisora', who has been identified as possibly Elizabeth Stonhurst alias Doune of Doune (Down) Place.

He was a member (MP) of the parliament of England for Guildford in 1407.
