= William Weston III =

English politician

William Weston III (fl. 1415–1447) of Ockham, Surrey, was an English politician.

== Family ==
He was the son of William Weston, MP for Surrey, and his son, John Weston, was also an MP. The Weston family were prominent in the area.

== Career ==
He was a Member of the Parliament of England for Guildford in 1415, 1419, 1423 and 1431, and then for Surrey in 1447.
