= 1931 Guildford by-election =

1931 UK parliamentary by-election

The 1931 Guildford by-election was a parliamentary by-election held for the British House of Commons constituency of Guildford in Surrey on 25 August 1931.

The seat had become vacant on the death of the Conservative Member of Parliament (MP) Sir Henry Buckingham, who had held the seat since the 1922 general election.

The Liberal candidate who had finished a strong second at the 1929 general election, Somerset Stopford Brooke, withdrew his candidature, allowing the Conservatives an uncontested return the day after Ramsay MacDonald formed his National Government.

The Conservative candidate, Charles Rhys, had previously been MP for Romford from 1923 general election to 1929 general election, and held the Guildford seat until he stood down at the 1935 general election

== See also ==
- Guildford (UK Parliament constituency)
- The town of Guildford
- List of United Kingdom by-elections (1918–1931)
