= Richard Eton =

English politician

Richard Eton (before 1411 – after 1434), of Pirbright and Merrow, Surrey, was an English politician.

== Family ==
Nothing is recorded of his family.

== Career ==
He was a member of Parliament for Guildford in May 1413 and March 1416. He was Mayor of Guildford in 1424–25.
