= Robert Parkhurst (Lord Mayor) =

English merchant

Sir Robert Parkhurst (c. 1569–1636) was an English merchant who was Lord Mayor of London.

Parkhurst was the son of Henry Parkhurst and his wife Alice Hills. He was a member of the Worshipful Company of Clothworkers and became an Alderman of the City of London. In 1628, he acquired estates at Pyrford. In 1625 he served as Sheriff of London and in 1635 he became Lord Mayor of London.

Parkhurst died in 1636 and was buried at Holy Trinity Church, Guildford on 27 October 1636 where there is a large monument to his memory.

Parkhurst married Eleanor Babington, daughter of William Babington. His son Robert was MP for Guildford.

Civic offices
Preceded by Thomas Moulson	Lord Mayor of London; 1635–1636	Succeeded by Christopher Clitherow
