= Thomas Richard Waller =

American malacologist (born 1937)

- Born: 18 July 1937 (age 89); Chicago, Illinois, United States
- Education: University of Wisconsin–Madison; Columbia University
- Known for: Research on Bivalvia; establishment of the order Limida
- Scientific career
- Fields: Malacology, Paleontology
- Workplaces: Smithsonian Institution

Thomas Richard Waller (born 18 July 1937) is an American malacologist and paleontologist.

Waller graduated from Oak Park and River Forest High School and studied at the University of Wisconsin–Madison, where he earned a Bachelor of Science in Geology in 1959 and a Master of Science degree in 1961. He received his Ph.D. in geology from Columbia University in 1966. In the same year, he joined the Smithsonian Institution in Washington, D.C., where he became Associate Curator, and since 1974 he has served as Curator of Mollusks. From 1966, as member of staff of the National Museum of Natural History, he started looking at scallops, work that he continued ever since.

His research focuses on the evolution, ecology, functional morphology, and systematics of bivalves. In 1978, Waller established the bivalve order Limida. His work includes both extant and fossil bivalves, with particular emphasis on scallops (family Pectinidae).

Waller was elected a Fellow of the American Association for the Advancement of Science in 1986 and received the Gilbert Harris Award from the Paleontological Research Institution.

== Selected publications ==
- The Pectinidae (Mollusca: Bivalvia) of Eniwetok Atoll, Marshall Islands, The Veliger, volume 14, 1972, pages 221–264.
- Morphology, morphoclines and a new classification of the Pteriomorphia (Mollusca: Bivalvia), Philosophical Transactions of the Royal Society of London, Series B, volume 284, 1978, pages 345–365.
- Evolutionary relationships among commercial scallops, in: S. E. Shumway (ed.), Scallops: Biology, Ecology and Aquaculture, Elsevier, Amsterdam, 1991.
- With G. D. Stanley Jr.: Middle Triassic pteriomorphian Bivalvia (Mollusca) from the New Pass Range, west-central Nevada: systematics, biostratigraphy, paleoecology, and paleobiogeography, Journal of Paleontology Memoir 61, supplement to Journal of Paleontology, volume 79, 2005.
