= Henry Colas (fl. 1377) =

Member of the Parliament of England

Henry Colas was an English politician who served in the English Parliament for Guildford in January 1377. He is believed to be the father of another MP of the same name.
