= Robert Parkhurst (died 1651) =

English politician

Sir Robert Parkhurst (c. July 1603 – August 1651) was an English politician who sat in the House of Commons between 1625 and 1651. He supported the Parliamentary cause in the English Civil War.

Parkhurst was the son of Sir Robert Parkhurst, Lord Mayor of London, and his wife Eleanor Babington, daughter of William Babington. He was baptised at Saint Mary Le Bow on 5 July 1603.

In 1625 Parkhurst was elected member of parliament for Guildford. He was re-elected in 1626 and in 1628 and sat until 1629 when King Charles decided to rule without parliament for eleven years.

Parkhurst inherited the estates including Pyrford on the death of his father in 1636 and was knighted at Dublin on 29 April 1638. In April 1640, he was re-elected MP for Guldford in the Short Parliament. He was elected again as MP for Guildford for the Long Parliament in November 1640. Parkhurst was a puritan and supported the parliamentarian cause.

Parkhurst died at the age of 48 and was buried at Holy Trinity, Guildford on 21 Aug 1651.

Parkhurst married firstly Elizabeth Baker, daughter of Henry Baker. He married, secondly Silence Crewe, daughter of Thomas Crewe on 6 June 1642, in Saint Margaret, Westminster. His sons Robert and John were also MPs.

Parliament of England
| Preceded by Sir George Moor; Nicholas Stoughton | Member of Parliament for Guildford; 1625–1629; With: Sir William Morley 1625–1626; Sir Poynings More, 1st Baronet 1628–1629 | Parliament suspended until 1640 |
| Vacant Parliament suspended since 1629 | Member of Parliament for Guildford; 1640–1651; With: George Abbotts 1640–1645; Nicholas Stoughton 1645–1648 | Not represented in Barebones Parliament |
