= Robert Parkhurst (died 1674) =

English politician

Sir Robert Parkhurst (died 1674) was an English politician who sat in the House of Commons in 1659.

== Biography ==
Parkhurst was the son of Sir Robert Parkhurst and his wife Elizabeth Baker, daughter of Henry Baker. He was admitted at Emmanuel College, Cambridge on 24 May 1647 and admitted at Inner Temple on 30 October 1648.

Parkhurst married Sarah Gayer, daughter of Sir John Gayer of Stoke Poges, Buckinghamshire. He inherited the estates including Pyrford on the death of his father in 1651

In 1659 Parkhurst was elected member of parliament for Guildford in the Third Protectorate Parliament. He was knighted on 9 June 1660. His brother John was also an MP.

Parkhurst died in 1674 and was buried at Holy Trinity, Guildford on 20 November 1674.

Parliament of England
Preceded by John Hewson	Member of Parliament for Guildford; 1659; With: Carew Raleigh	Succeeded by Not represented in Restored Rump
