= John Wharton (fl. 1407–1420) =

English politician

John Wharton (fl. 1407–1420) was an English politician.

He was a Member (MP) of the Parliament of England for Guildford in 1407 and 1420. He may also have been returned for Guildford in 1421 or an administrative error may have been made, as his name is in the records but crossed out in favour of John Gregg. Nothing more is recorded of him.
