= Thomas Brocas =

English politician

Thomas Brocas (fl. 1390–1404) of Compton, Surrey, was an English politician.

== Family ==
He had three sons: Thomas, John and the MP, Arnold Brocas. He is likely to have been related to Hampshire MP, Bernard Brocas.

== Career ==
He was a member (MP) of the parliament of England for Guildford in January 1390, 1395 and January 1404.
