= Geoffrey Mudge =

English politician

Geoffrey Mudge (fl. 1414–1427), of Guildford, Surrey, was an English politician.

== Family ==
Geoffrey Mudge was married to Joan Mudge. Nothing more is recorded of his family.

== Career ==
He was a Member (MP) of the Parliament of England for Guildford in November 1414. He was Mayor of Guildford from 1426 to 1427.
