= John Thorne (MP) =

English politician

John Thorne (fl. 1383–1393) of Guildford, Surrey, was an English politician.

He was a member (MP) of the parliament of England for Guildford in October 1383, September 1388 and 1393.
