= John Gatyn =

Member of the Parliament of England

Member of Parliament
- Constituency: Guildford

John Gatyn (fl. 1385–1404) of London and Guildford, Surrey, was an English politician, fishmonger and property owner.

He was a member (MP) of the parliament of England for Guildford in 1385, 1386, 1391, 1395, January 1397, 1399, 1401 and January 1404.
