= Charles Baring Wall =

English politician (1795–1853)

Charles Baring Wall (1795 – 14 October 1853) was at various times the Member of Parliament for Guildford, Wareham, Weymouth and Salisbury. Wall was initially a Conservative but shifted to the Whigs as an MP for Guildford. He then belonged to the Peelite faction, and died while MP for Salisbury.

He was the son of the banker Charles Wall and the religious enthusiast Harriet Baring. His maternal grandfather was Francis Baring, 1st Baronet. He was educated at Eton College and Christ Church, Oxford.

Wall did not marry. In 1833, he was placed on trial for an indecent assault on John Palmer, a police constable. Wall was acquitted, and Palmer forced to resign, one newspaper subsequently printing: "a man in an inferior station in life, is a ruined man, if he dare to accuse one of higher degree of an immoral crime."

His property included the Norman Court estate, straddling the Hampshire/Wiltshire border.
