= John Gregg (Guildford MP) =

Member of the Parliament of England

John Gregg (died 1431 or after) of London and Guildford, Surrey, was an English politician and grocer.

He was a Member (MP) of the Parliament of England for Guildford in 1417 and May 1421.
