= Henry Currie =

Politician

Henry Currie (1798 – 1873) was the Conservative MP for Guildford from 1847 to 1852.

== Early life ==
He was the son of William Currie, of East Horsley Park, Surrey, MP for Gatton, and his wife, Percy, daughter of Francis Gore. He was the cousin of Sir Frederick Currie, 1st Baronet (1799–1875). He was educated at Eton College.

== Career ==
Currie lived at West Horsley Place, in West Horsley, Surrey.

== Personal life ==
In 1825, Currie married Emma Knox, the daughter of Colonel Thomas Knox, and they had three children:

- Henry William Currie (1828-?)
- Emily Currie, married Charles Henry Wyndham A'Court in 1854
- Mary Currie, in 1859, married Sir Edward Robert Sullivan, 5th Baronet of Ravenhead, Lancs.
