= Thomas Ingram (MP for Guildford) =

Member of the Parliament of England

Thomas Ingram (died after 1434), of Shere, Surrey, was an English politician, landowner and member of the gentry.

== Family ==
Nothing is recorded of his family.

== Career ==
He was a Member (MP) of the Parliament of England for Guildford in 1415.
