= William Hammond (died 1575) =

English politician

William Hammond (by 1525 – 10 April 1575) was an English politician.

He was a member (MP) of the Parliament of England for Guildford in October 1553, April 1554 and 1558. He was Mayor of Guildford from 1550 to 1551, as his father William Hammond had been.
