= Richard West (MP for Haslemere) =

Member of the Parliament of England

Richard West (before 17 January 1636 – 27 February 1674) was an English landowner and politician who sat in the House of Commons from April 1660 until the election of March the next year.

== Personal life ==
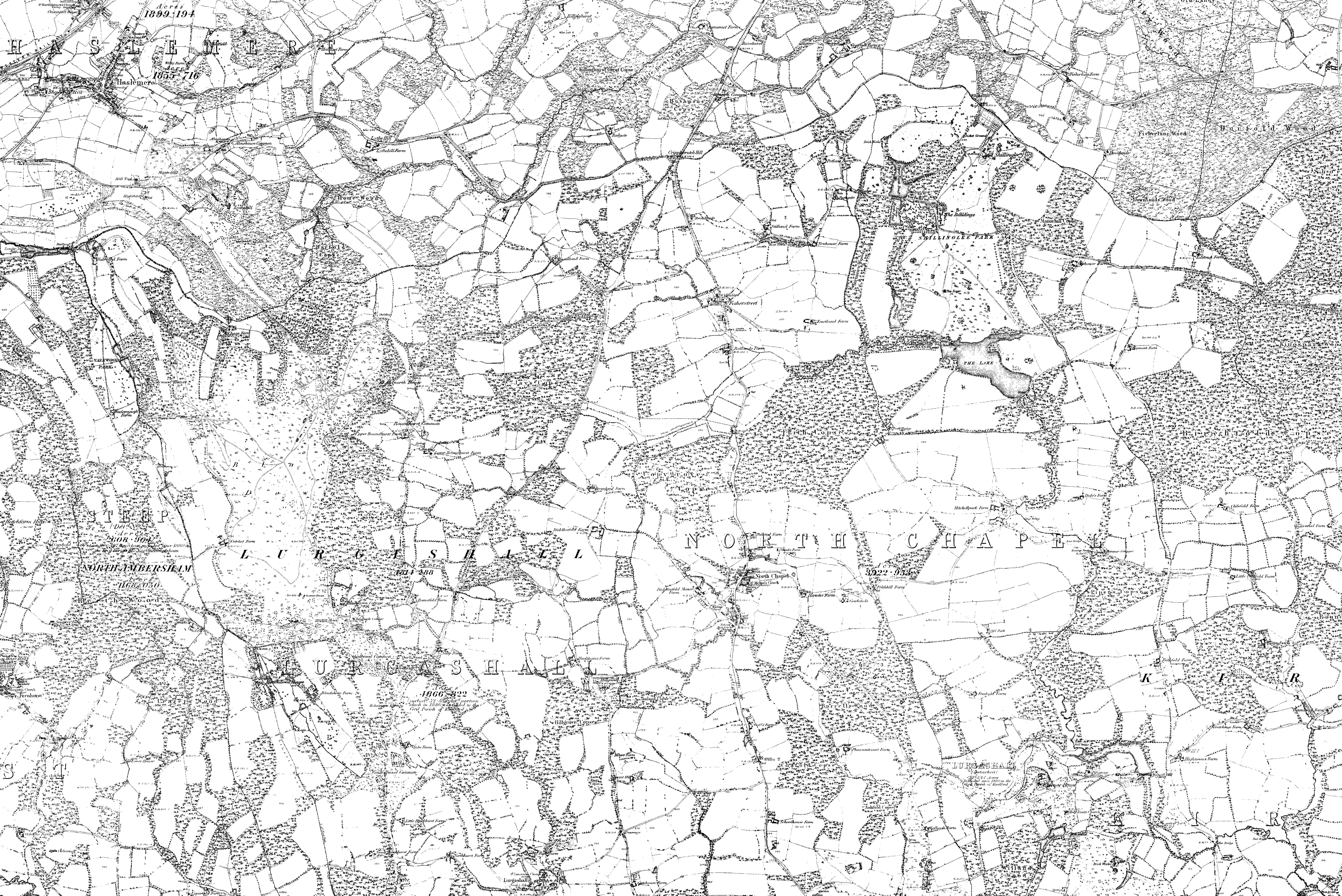
The family home with tenanted land he inherited in 1654, shown two centuries later, and context (click to expand)

He was the son of a namesake who in died 1642, a yeoman (landowner) of Haslemere, Surrey and his wife Alice Sturt.

He was baptised on 17 January 1636. Aged eighteen, he inherited at least one mill and many premises from his grandfather, a clothier, specifically a textiles manufacturer, who had been in frequent trouble with the court leet in Haslemere for illegal and extortionate milling. Haslemere had active mills on the River Wey, working various goods. The inheritance included productive premises in Haslemere and in the adjacent, Black Down-dominated northern part of Lurgashall, West Sussex – one of its main estates, Roundhurst where he tended to live.

West died at the age of 38, and was buried at the Anglican church of St Bartholomew, Haslemere (Note: See List of places of worship in Waverley (borough)) under a Latin inscription.

West married Eleanor Westbrooke daughter of Caleb Westbrooke of Witley, Surrey on 29 September 1653. They had a son and three daughters. His widow died on 21 August 1699.

== Public life ==
In 1660, he was elected co-Member of Parliament for Haslemere for the Convention Parliament (namely with his brother-in-law, John Westbrooke). He was commissioner for assessment for Surrey from August 1660 to his death.

== References and footnotes ==
Parliament of England
Preceded by Carew Raleigh; John Goodwin	Member of Parliament for Haslemere; 1660; With: John Westbrooke	Succeeded by James Gresham; Chaloner Chute
