= George Vernon (MP, died 1735) =

English politician

George Vernon (1661–1735) was an English politician for a Surrey constituency in the late seventeenth and early eighteenth centuries.

Vernon was born in Farnham. His father had been the M.P. for Haslemere from 1685 to 1689. He too served on three separate occasions as the town's MP.

== Notes ==
Parliament of England
Preceded by George Woodroffe	Member of Parliament for Haslemere; 1698–1700; With: Theophilus Oglethorpe Sr.	Succeeded by George Woodroffe
Preceded by Theophilus Oglethorpe Sr.	Member of Parliament for Haslemere; 1702–1705; With: George Woodroffe; Lewis Oglethorpe; Thomas Heath	Succeeded by George Woodroffe
Parliament of Great Britain
Preceded by Theophilus Oglethorpe Jr.	Member of Parliament for Haslemere; 1713–1715; With: Thomas Onslow; Nicholas Carew	Succeeded by Montague Blundell
