= John Westbrooke =

English landowner and politician

John Westbrooke (1616 - 7 June 1666) was an English landowner and politician who sat in the House of Commons in 1659 and 1660.

Westbrooke was the eldest surviving son of Caleb Westbrooke of Witley and his wife Phoebe Taylor, daughter of Francis Taylor of Godalming, Surrey. He was baptised on 1 September 1616. He succeeded to the estate of Witley on the death of his father in 1635. In 1649 he became commissioner for assessment and J.P. for Surrey until 1652. In 1650 he was a captain of militia horse and by 1651 he was a commissioner for militia. He was a JP again from 1654 to July 1660 and was commissioner for assessment in 1657.

In 1659, Westbrooke was elected Member of Parliament for Haslemere in the Third Protectorate Parliament. He was commissioner for militia in March 1660 and a captain of militia infantry in April 1660. In April 1660, he was re-elected MP for Haslemere for the Convention Parliament. He was commissioner for assessment from August 1660 to 1661.

Westbrooke died at the age of 49 and was buried at Ferring.

Westbrooke married Barbara Watersfield daughter of William Watersfield of West Ferring on 17 July 1637. They had four sons and two daughters. She died in 1657.

Parliament of England
Preceded by Not represented in Second Protectorate Parliament	Member of Parliament for Haslemere; 1659; With: Henry Fitzjames	Succeeded by Carew Raleigh; John Goodwin
Preceded by Carew Raleigh; John Goodwin	Member of Parliament for Haslemere; 1660; With: Richard West	Succeeded by James Gresham; Chaloner Chute
