= More baronets =

Extinct baronetcy in the Baronetage of England

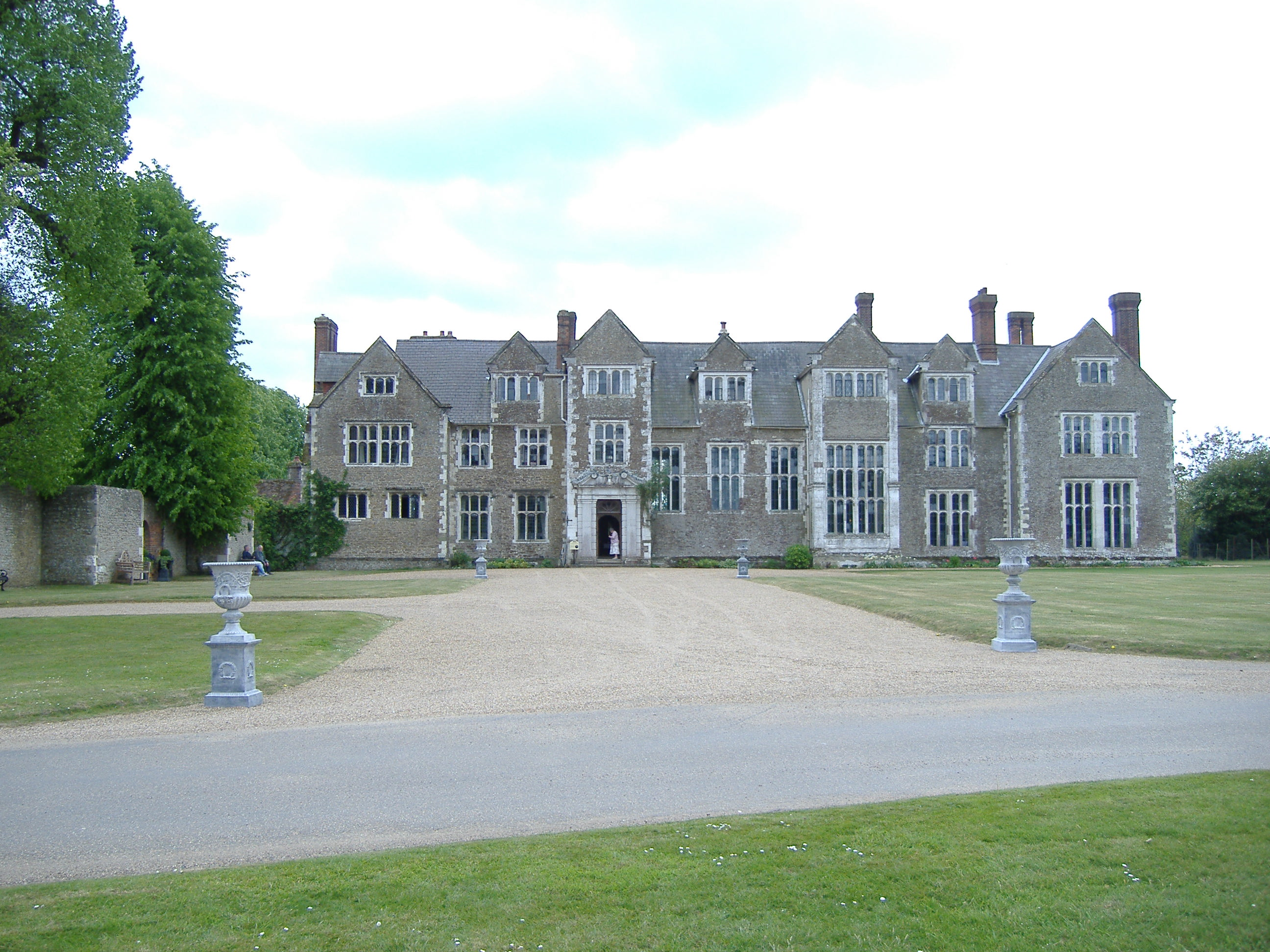
Loseley House, the seat of the More Baronets of Loseley.

There have been two baronetcies created for persons with the surname More, both in the Baronetage of England. Both creations are extinct.

The More Baronetcy, of Loseley in the County of Surrey, was created in the Baronetage of England on 18 May 1642 for Poynings More, Member of Parliament for Haslemere and Guildford. The second Baronet was Member of Parliament for Haslemere. The title became extinct on his death in 1684. The More family descended from Sir Christopher More (d. 1549), King's Remembrancer in the Exchequer and High Sheriff of Surrey and of Sussex during the reign of Henry VIII. His son Sir William More (d. 1660) represented Guildford in Parliament. Sir William's son Sir George More was a Member of Parliament and courtier. Sir George's son Sir Robert More (1581–1626) represented Surrey in Parliament. The first Baronet was the son of the latter.

The seat of the More family was Loseley Park, near Guildford, Surrey. After the death of the second Baronet the family estate passed to the late Baronet's uncle, Reverend Nicholas More. Nicholas More devised the estates to his daughter Margaret More, wife of Sir Thomas Molyneux. Loseley Park has been in the hands of the More-Molyneux family since.

The More Baronetcy, of More Hall in the County of Lancaster, was created in the Baronetage of England on 22 November 1675 for Edward More. He was to have been created a baronet already in 1660 but the patent did not pass the Great Seal until 1675. The second Baronet sat as Member of Parliament for Bramber. The title became extinct on the death of the fifth Baronet in 1810. The More family descended from Sir William de la More, who was made a knight banneret by the Black Prince at the Battle of Poitiers in 1356.

== More baronets, of Loseley (1642) ==
Escutcheon of the More baronets of Loseley

- Sir Poynings More, 1st Baronet (1606–1649)
- Sir William More, 2nd Baronet (1644–1684)

== More baronets, of More Hall (1675) ==
Escutcheon of the More baronets of More Hall

- Sir Edward More, 1st Baronet (died 1678)
- Sir Cleave More, 2nd Baronet (1664–1730)
- Sir Joseph Edmonds Moore, 3rd Baronet (c. 1690–1732)
- Sir Joseph Edmonds Moore, 4th Baronet (c. 1715–1741)
- Sir William More, 5th Baronet (1738–1810)
