= Dundrum Castle =

Ruined castle at Dundrum, County Down, Northern Ireland

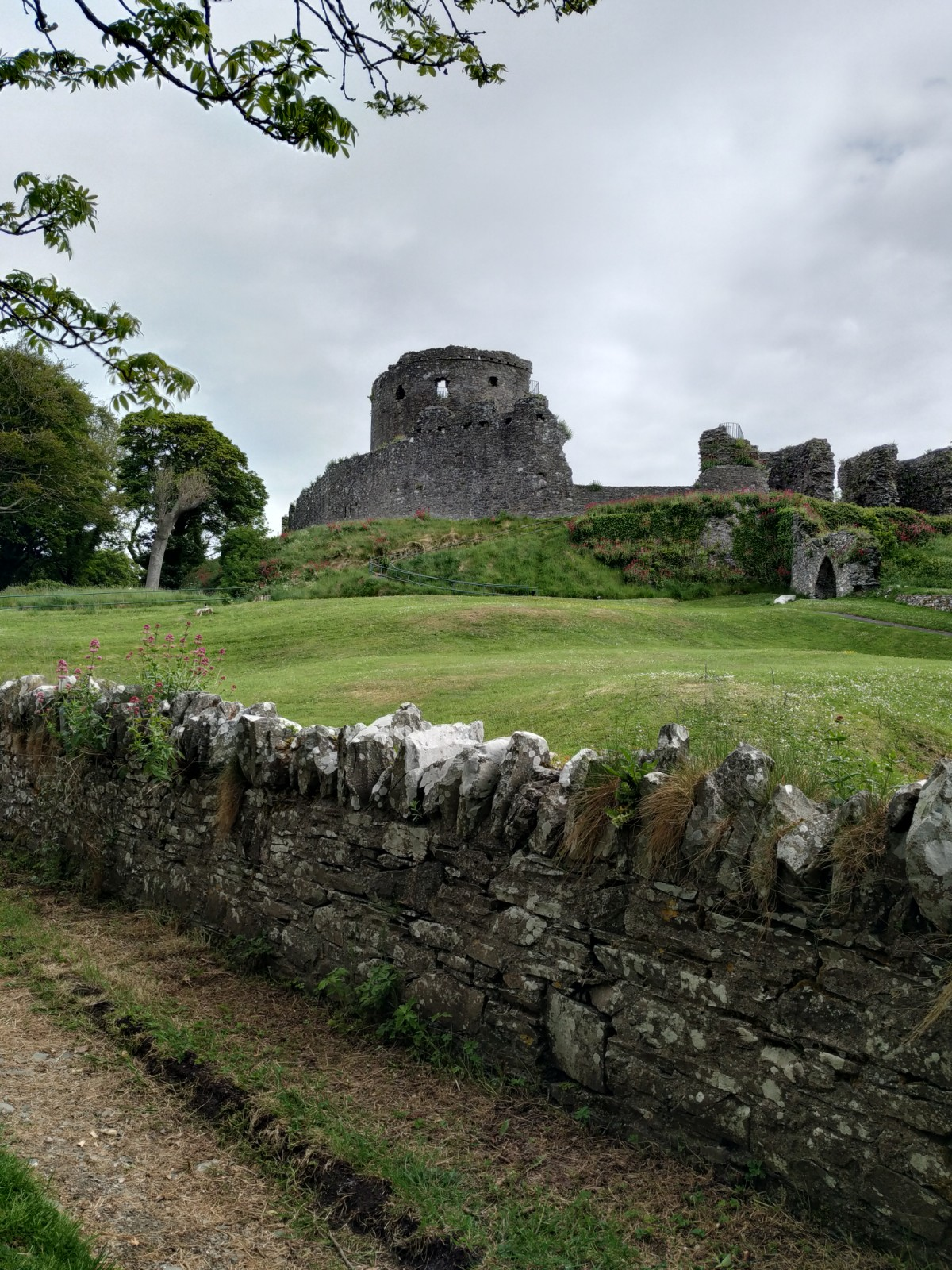

- Location in Northern Ireland
- 54.2566°N 5.874°W

Dundrum Castle, a ruin standing over the town of Dundrum, County Down, Northern Ireland. It was constructed by John de Courcy, sometime near the beginning of the 13th century, following his invasion of Ulster. The castle, built to control access into Lecale from the west and south, stands on the top of a rocky hill commanding fine views south over Dundrum Bay and the Mourne Mountains, the lands west towards Slieve Croob and the plains of Lecale to the east. The Castle is a State Care Historic Monument in the townland of Dundrum, in Newry, Mourne and Down District Council area, at grid ref: J4047 3700.

== Origins and ownership ==
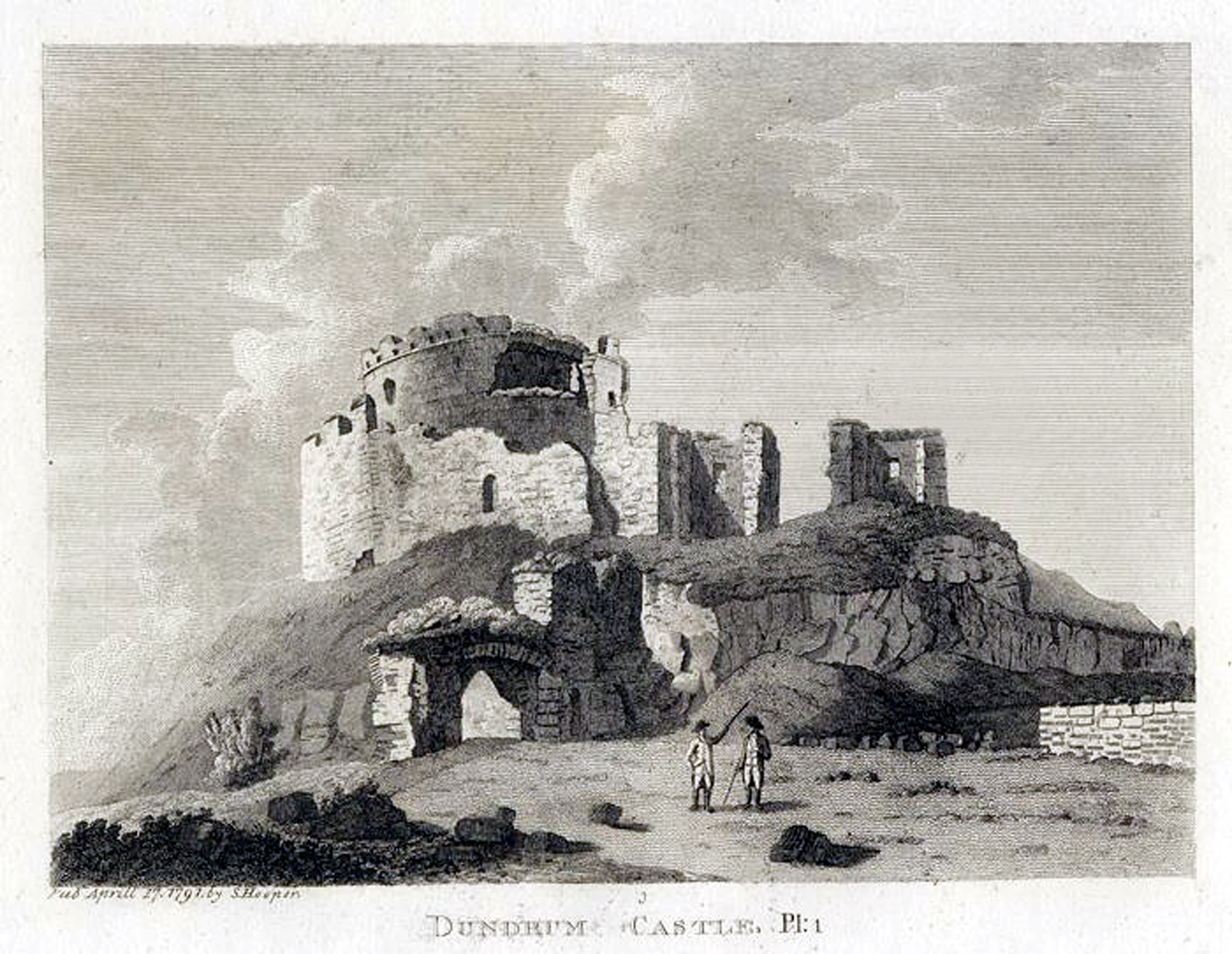
The castle in 1791

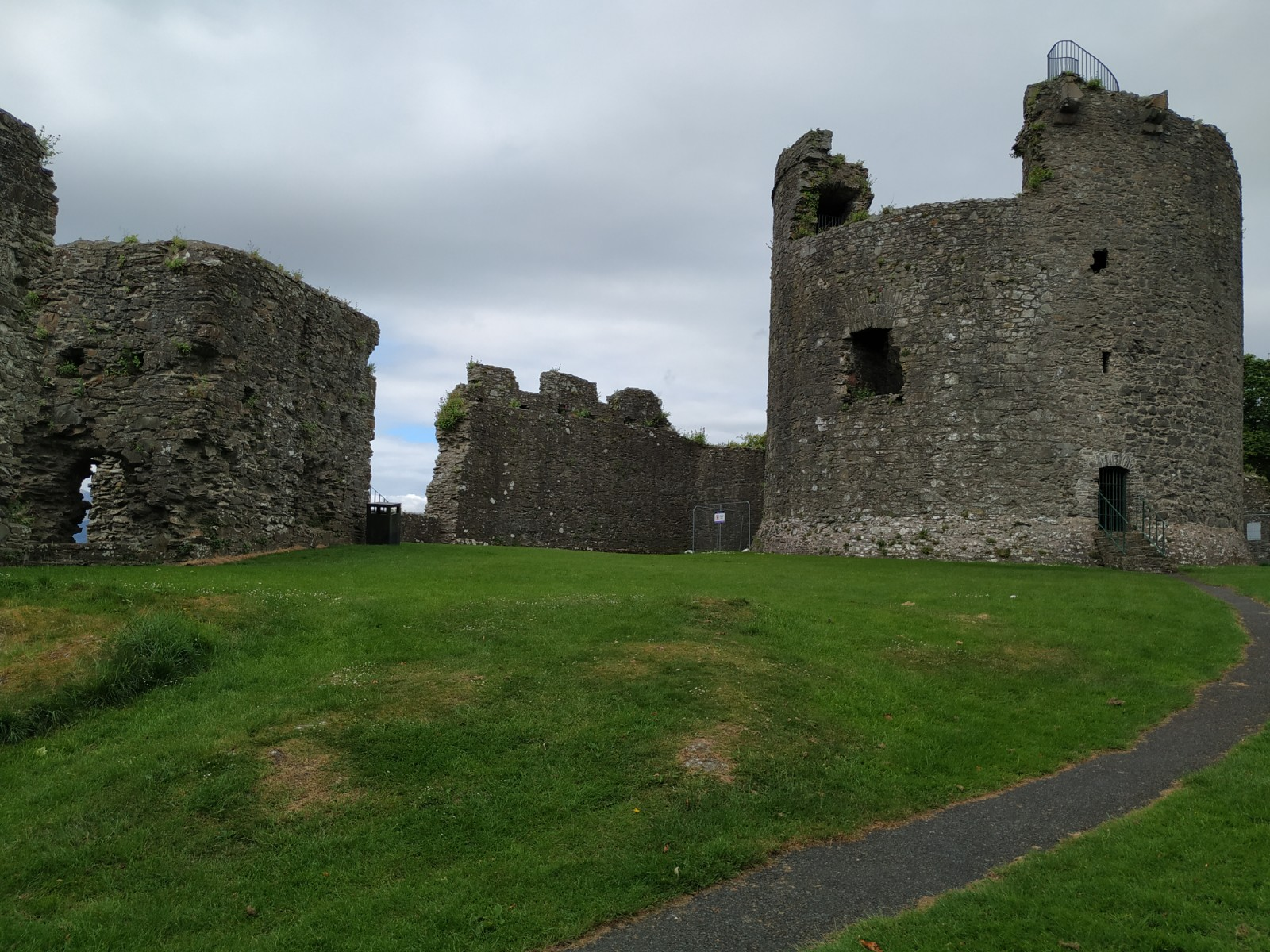
The keep inside the upper ward

De Courcy's original castle may have had defences of earth and timber, but the stone curtain wall of the upper ward was probably built at the beginning of the 13th century. As with other early enclosure walls, there were no towers, but defence was assisted by covered walks along the outside wall-head. An early timber hall may have stood near the keep, where there is a double-latrine in the curtain wall.

In 1203 de Courcy was expelled from Ulster by Hugh de Lacy. The earliest reference to the castle occurs in the mid-13th century Chronicle of Mann, which records de Courcy's unsuccessful attempt to besiege "the castle of Rath" in 1205, with the aid of one hundred ships of his brother-in-law, Rǫgnvaldr Guðrøðarson, King of the Isles.

The castle was then captured by King John in 1210. Hugh de Lacy strengthened the castle with a massive round keep, probably employing master masons from the Welsh Marches, where such keeps were then popular. Although much of the second floor of this keep was rebuilt in the 15th century, it is clear from the survival of the old fireplace flue and spiral stair that it originally stood at least three storeys high. The basement was used for storage and had a cistern below the first floor, which appears to have been the great chamber for the lord's day-to-day living, while the floor above would have housed his private chamber. The castle remained Crown property until de Lacy was allowed to return to his Earldom in 1226. It was probably after de Lacy's second tenure as Earl of Ulster (1227–43) that the twin-towered gatehouse, similar to the one at Pembroke Castle, was inserted in the curtain wall. It has a lopsided design with only one projecting tower to protect the approach along a narrow ramp from the south-west.

The stone curtain wall of the outer bailey is likely to have been built by the Mac Artáin chiefs of Kinelarty, who owned Dundrum in the late 15th century. At some point after 1333 it was managed by their cousins the Magennis clan, and is sometimes called "Magennis Castle". The Earl of Kildare briefly captured the castle in 1517 as did Lord Deputy Grey in 1538. Phelim Magennis Mac Artáin and his son Donal Oge Mac Artáin later surrendered the castle to Lord Mountjoy in 1601. It was made over to Lord Cromwell in 1605 and sold to Sir George Blundell in 1636. The Mac Artáin clan were possibly regranted the castle at Dundrum, but later had it repossessed by the Parliamentarians, who dismantled the castle in 1652 after they withdrew their garrison.

After 1660 the Blundells returned and built a gabled L-shaped mansion in the south-west corner of the outer bailey. This dwelling was ruined by the time the property passed to the second Marquess of Downshire in the early 19th century, though the trees on the hill were probably planted at this time. The castle and grounds were placed in State Care by the seventh Marquess in 1954.

The castle is an important example of Norman architecture, and is a regular destination for tourists and school children. It was the subject of an episode of archaeological television programme Time Team, broadcast on 24 February 2013.

== Dundrum Castle, County Tipperary ==
An unrelated structure called Dundrum Castle existed near Dundrum, County Tipperary and was the family seat of the O’Dwyers Kilnamanagh, members of the Gaelic aristocracy. Following the invasion of Ireland by Oliver Cromwell and the ill-fated retributive capture of the Rock of Cashel by the last clan chief Philip O'Dwyer, the O'Dwyers lost their properties per the Act of Settlement 1662. Dundrum Castle was destroyed sometime afterwards.

=== Dundrum House ===
In 1730, a mansion known as Dundrum House was built on the site. Dundrum House became the home of Cornelius Maude, Viscount Hawarden, and his descendants. In the early 20th century, Dundrum House was sold to an order of Roman Catholic nuns. In 1978, Dundrum House became a luxury hotel and golf club. In 2015, it ceased to be a hotel.

==== Asylum seekers ====
From July 2024, there was a 24-hour protest outside Dundrum House by locals worried that Dundrum House was to house up to 277 asylum seekers, doubling the local population.

== Gallery ==
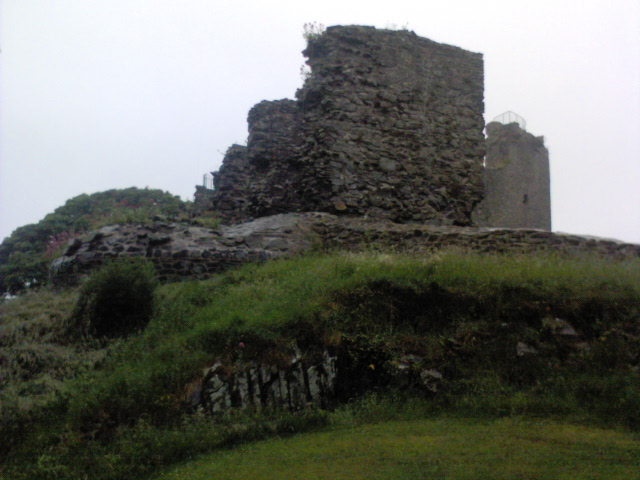
Dundrum Castle

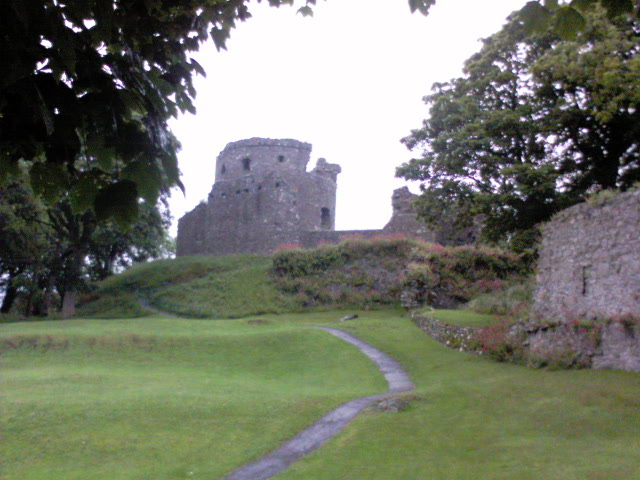
Dundrum Castle

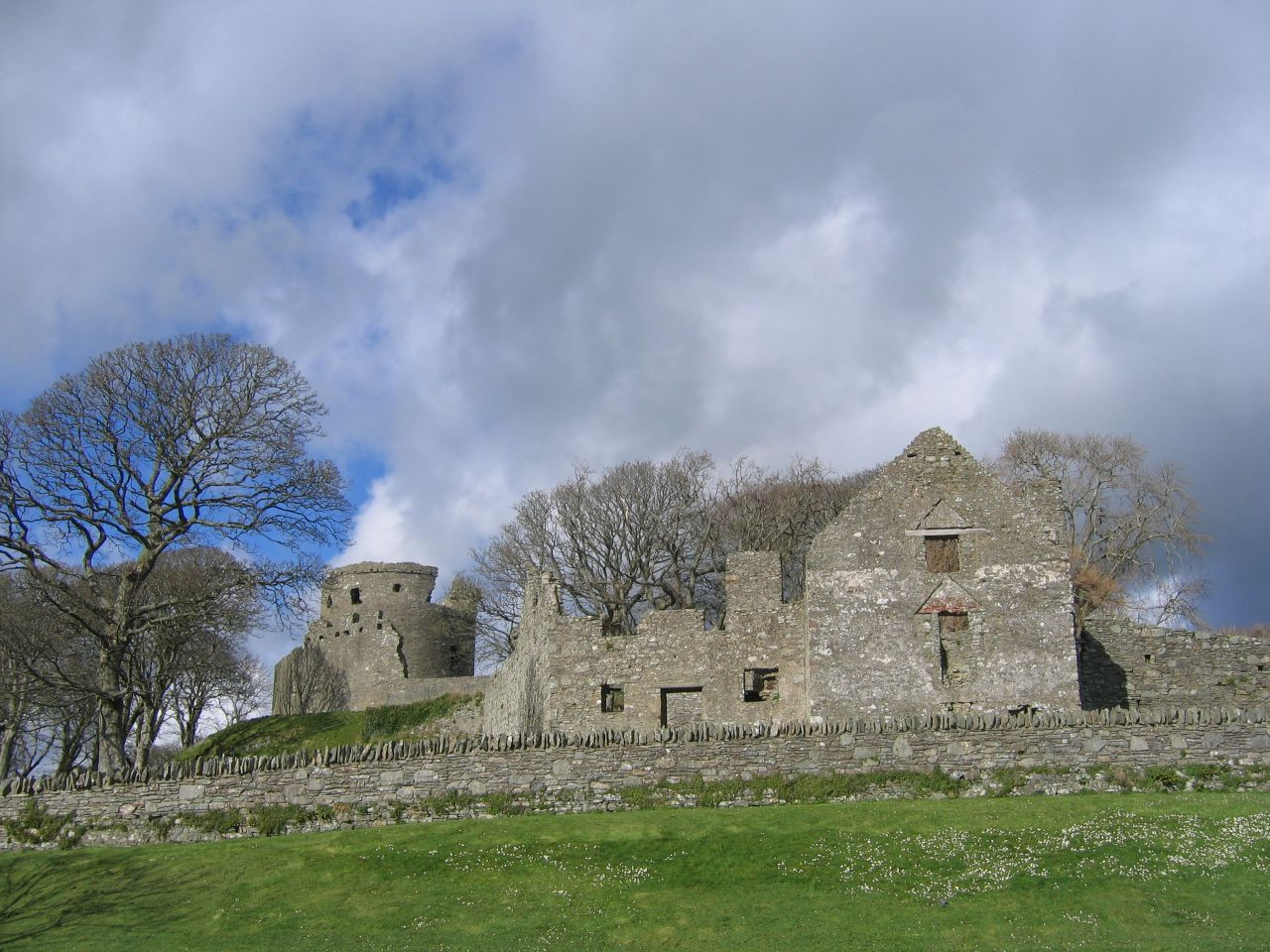
Blundell's House

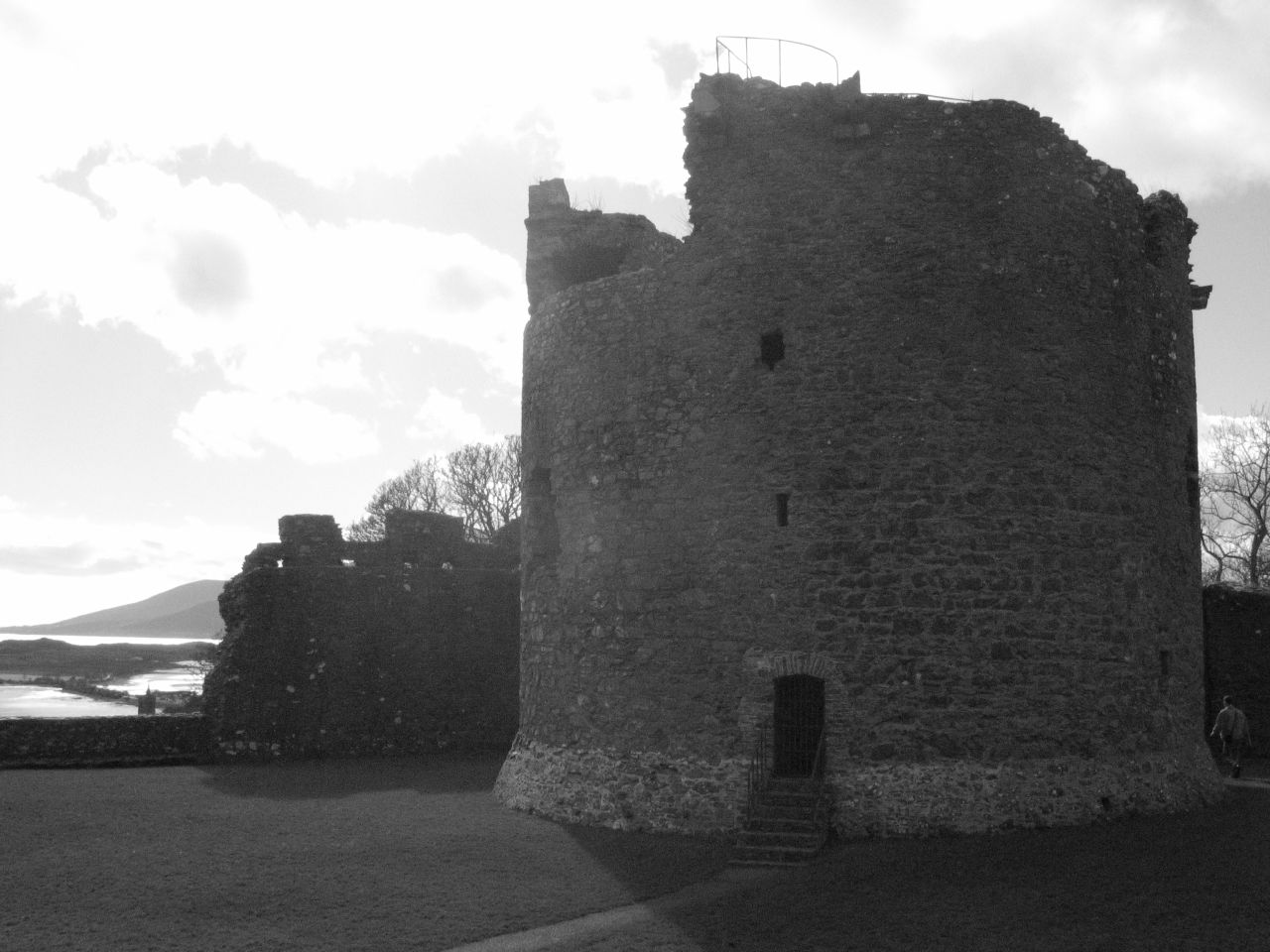
Dundrum Castle

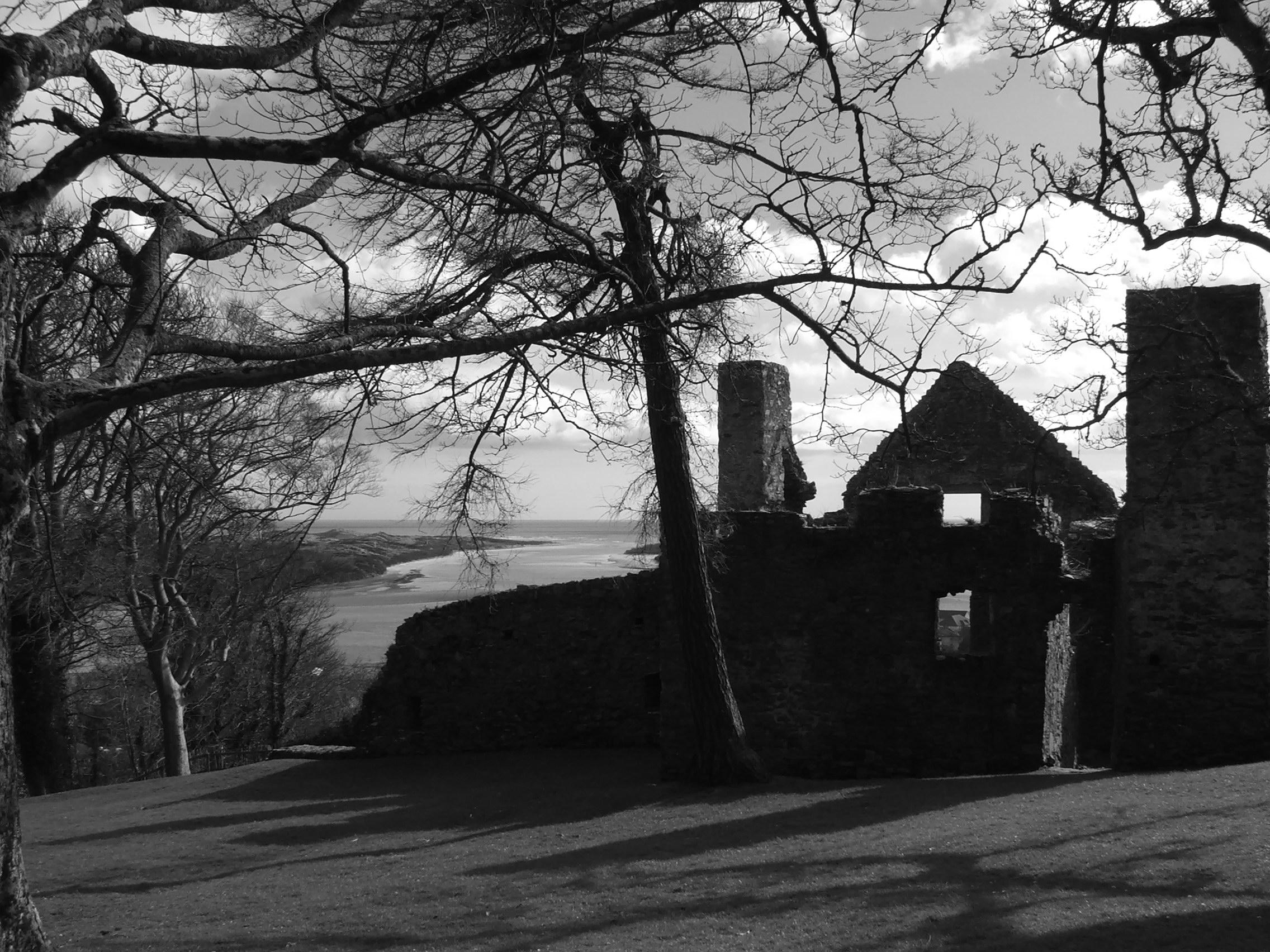
Blundell's House

== See also ==
- Castles in Northern Ireland
