= William Elliott =

William Elliott may refer to:

== In the arts ==
- William Elliott (painter) (died 1792), lieutenant in the Royal Navy and marine painter
- William Elliott (engraver) (1727–1766), English engraver
- Wild Bill Elliott (1904–1965), American film actor sometimes credited as Bill Elliott; birth name Gordon Nance
- William Elliott (actor, born 1934) (1934–1983), American stage and film actor
- William Elliott (actor, born 1879) (1879–1932), American stage and film actor
- Will Elliott (born 1979), Australian horror fiction writer
- William A. Elliott, art director
- Bill Elliott (musician) (born 1951), bandleader, film composer

== In military ==
- William Elliott (painter) (died 1792), lieutenant in the Royal Navy and marine painter
- William Henry Elliott (1792–1874), British general
- Sir William Elliot (RAF officer) (1896–1971), senior RAF commander during WWII
- William Elliott (RAF officer) (1898–1979), World War I flying ace

== In politics and government ==
- William Yandell Elliott (1896–1979), American historian and political advisor
- William Elliott, Baron Elliott of Morpeth (1920–2011), British Conservative party politician, MP 1957–1983
- William J. S. Elliott, Commissioner of the Royal Canadian Mounted Police
- William Elliott (American politician) (1838–1907), U.S. congressman from South Carolina
- William Elliott (Peel MP) (1834–1912), member of the Canadian House of Commons representing Peel, 1878–1882
- William Elliott (Pennsylvania politician), Speaker of the Pennsylvania House of Representatives, 1872–1873
- William Elliott (Saskatchewan politician) (1863–1934), member of the Northwest Territories legislature 1898–1905 and Saskatchewan assembly 1905–1912
- William Elliott (Upper Canada politician) (1775–1867), politician in Upper Canada
- William Elliott (Ontario politician) (1872–1944), Progressive Party member of the Canadian House of Commons
- William Herbert Elliott (1872–?), businessman and political figure in Ontario
- William M. Elliott (died 1882), American politician

== In sports ==
- William Elliott Sr. (born 1955), American race car driver professionally known as Bill Elliott
- William Elliott Jr. (born 1995), American race car driver professionally known as Chase Elliott
- William Elliott (writer) (1788–1863), South Carolinian sportsman and writer
- William Elliott (rower) (1849–?), English professional sculling champion
- William Elliott (cricketer) (1842–?), English cricketer
- Bill Elliott (rugby league) (1882–1975), Australian rugby league player
- Bill Elliott (soccer), American college soccer coach

== See also ==
- William Elliot (disambiguation)
- Billy Elliot (disambiguation)
- William Eliot (disambiguation)
