= Poynings More =

English politician (1606–1649)

MP

1st Baronet
- Constituency: Haslemere, Guildford

Personal details
- Born: 1606
- Died: 11 April 1649 (aged 42–43)
- Resting place: Saint Nicolas Parish Church, Guildford, Surrey, England
- Occupation: Politician

Sir Poynings More, 1st Baronet (1606–1649) was an English politician who sat in the House of Commons at various times between 1624 and 1640.

== Early life ==
More was the son of Sir Robert More (1581–1626), son of George More and Ann Poynings, and his wife Frances Lennard, daughter of Sampson Lennard of Knole, Kent, and Hurstmonceux, Sussex.

== Career ==
In 1624, More was elected Member of Parliament for Haslemere. He was re-elected MP for Haslemere in 1625 and 1626. In 1628 he was elected MP for Guildford and sat until 1629 when Charles I decided to rule without parliament for eleven years. In November 1640, More was re-elected MP for Haslemere in the Long Parliament. He was created a baronet in 1642.

== Death ==
He sat in parliament until his death on 11 April 1649. He was buried on 13 April 1649 at Saint Nicolas Parish Church, Guildford, Surrey, England.

== Personal life ==
More married Elizabeth Rous, widow of Christopher Rous of Henham, Suffolk and daughter of Sir William Fitch of Woodham Walter, Essex. She died in 1666 and on 3 September 1666 was also buried at Saint Nicolas Parish Church. Their son William More (1643 – 24 July 1684) is buried at Saint Nicolas Parish Church, Guildford.

Parliament of England
Preceded by Sir Thomas Grimes; Sir William Browne	Member of Parliament for Haslemere; 1624–1626; With: Francis Carew	Succeeded by George Grimes; Sir Thomas Canon
Preceded by Sir Robert Morley; Robert Parkhurst	Member of Parliament for Guildford; 1628–1629; With: Robert Parkhurst	Parliament suspended until 1640
Preceded by Sir John Jacques; William Eliot	Member of Parliament for Haslemere; 1640–1649; With: John Goodwin	Succeeded by John Goodwin
Baronetage of England
New creation	Baronet (of Loseley); 1642–1649	Succeeded by William More
