= Francis Blundell =

Francis Blundell may refer to:

- Sir Francis Blundell, 1st Baronet (1579–1625), English-born lawyer, politician and administrator in Ireland, MP for Lifford
- Sir Francis Blundell, 3rd Baronet (1643–1707), Irish MP for King's County
- Francis Blundell (MP for Ormskirk) (1880–1936), British MP for Ormskirk
