= William Elliot =

William Elliot may refer to:

== Politicians ==
- William Elliot of Wells (1701–64), English army officer, courtier and MP
- William Elliot (Irish politician) (1766–1818), MP and Chief Secretary for Ireland
- William Elliot-Murray-Kynynmound, 3rd Earl of Minto (1814–1891), British Whig politician, MP for Hythe, Greenock, and for Clackmannan and Kinross
- William Eliot (MP)

== Others ==
- William Elliot (rugby union) (1867–1958), New Zealand rugby union footballer
- William Elliot (1780–1853), instrument maker in London, founder of the company that became Elliott Brothers
- William Elliot, a fictional character from the 1817 Jane Austen novel Persuasion
- William Elliot (RAF officer) (1896–1971), Royal Air Force commander

== See also ==
- Billy Elliot (disambiguation)
- William Eliot (disambiguation)
- William Elliott (disambiguation)
