= Lewis Oglethorpe =

Lewis Oglethorpe (22 February 1681 – 30 October 1704) was an English Member of Parliament and soldier.

He was educated at Middle Temple and Corpus Christi College, Oxford.

Oglethorpe entered parliament in 1702 as member for Haslemere, for which his father Sir Theophilus Oglethorpe had previously been MP and which was later represented by his brothers Theophilus, junior and James.

He was wounded at the Battle of Schellenberg in July 1704, and died as a result of his injuries three months later.

Parliament of England
Preceded by George Vernon; George Woodroffe	Member of Parliament for Haslemere; 1702–1704; With: George Vernon	Succeeded by George Vernon; Thomas Heath
