= John Clarke (fl. 1601) =

English politician

John Clarke was an English politician in the 17th century.

Clarke was born in London and lived at Hurtmore. In later life he moved to Battle, Sussex.

Parliament of England
Preceded by George Austen	Member of Parliament for Haslemere; 7 October 1601 – 29 December 1601; With: Francis Wolley	Succeeded by William Jackson
