= George Evelyn (1617–1699) =

English politician

George Evelyn (18 June 1617 – 4 October 1699) was an English politician who sat in the House of Commons at various times between 1640 and 1689.

Evelyn was the son of Richard Evelyn of Wotton, Surrey. The diarist, writer and gardener John Evelyn was his younger brother. He matriculated at Trinity College, Oxford on 24 October 1634, aged 18. He was a student of Middle Temple in 1636.

In November 1640, Evelyn was elected Member of Parliament for Reigate in the Long Parliament. He sat until 1648 when he was excluded under Pride's Purge.

In 1661, Evelyn was elected MP for Haslemere in the Cavalier Parliament. In 1678 he was elected MP for Surrey and sat until 1681. He was elected MP for Surrey again in 1689 and sat until 1690.

Evelyn died at the age of 82. As he left no living sons, his brother John inherited the Wotton estate.

Parliament of England
Preceded by Edward Thurland; Thomas Bludder	Member of Parliament for Reigate; 1640–1648; With: The Viscount Monson	Succeeded by Rump Parliament
Preceded by James Gresham; Chaloner Chute	Member of Parliament for Haslemere; 1661–1679; With: Thomas Morrice 1661–1675; Sir William More 1675–1679	Succeeded by Sir William More; James Gresham
Preceded by Sir Adam Browne; Edmund Bowyer	Member of Parliament for Surrey; 1679–1681; With: Arthur Onslow	Succeeded by Sir Edward Evelyn; Sir Adam Browne
Preceded by Sir Edward Evelyn; Sir Adam Browne	Member of Parliament for Surrey; 1689–1690; With: Sir Richard Onslow	Succeeded by Sir Richard Onslow; Sir Francis Vincent
