= Thomas Onslow, 2nd Baron Onslow =

British landowner and Whig politician

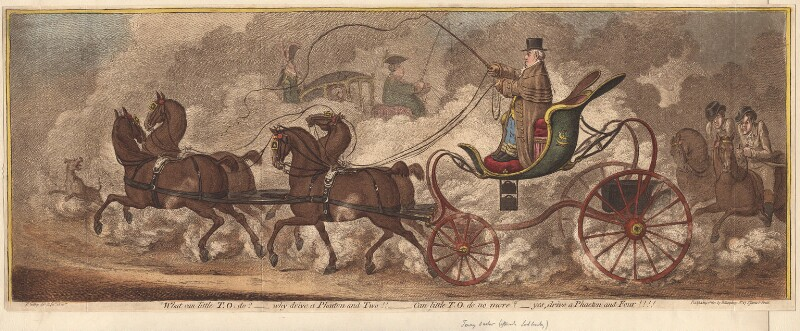
Thomas Onslow, 2nd Earl of Onslow

Thomas Onslow, 2nd Baron Onslow (27 November 1679 – 5 June 1740), of West Clandon, Surrey, was a British landowner and Whig politician who sat in the English and British House of Commons between 1702 and 1717. He commissioned the building of Clandon Park House in the 1730s.

== Early life ==
Onslow was the only surviving son of Richard Onslow, 1st Baron Onslow. He was educated at Eton College from 1691 to 1693, and the travelled abroad in Holland and France from 1697 to 1698. He married Elizabeth Knight, the daughter of John Knight, a merchant of Jamaica, and niece of Colonel Charles Knight, and was heir to both their fortunes.

== Political career ==
He represented a continuous succession of constituencies in the Parliament of England and Great Britain. He first entered Parliament in 1702, aged 22 or 23, as the MP for Gatton, Surrey, an underpopulated rural borough that had once had a market in the medieval period. He was then returned in 1705 to represent the larger settlement of Chichester, West Sussex, followed by Bletchingley (1708–1715) and finally the county seat of Surrey (1715–1717), which then included much of today's Greater London south of the Thames including, for example, Battersea and Lambeth. He was awarded LL.D at Cambridge University in 1717 and became 2nd Baron Onslow on the death of his father in 1717. He was a Teller of the Receipt of the Exchequer from 1718 to his death

== Personal finances and family life ==
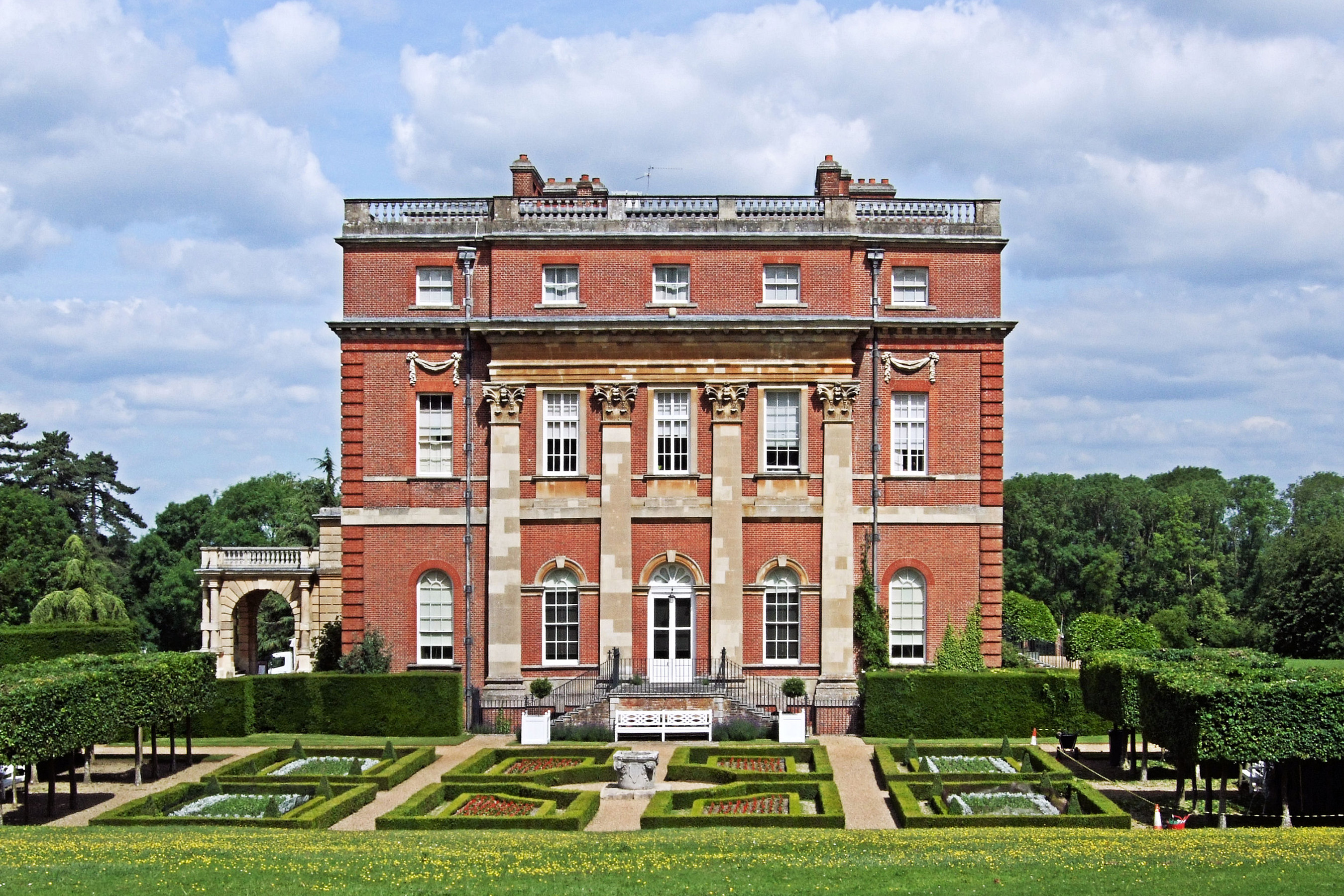
Clandon Park House was transformed from a large manor house to a lavish English country house by this Lord Onslow, but the 3rd Lord Onslow had its interiors finished. It features a two-storey Marble Hall and marble chimney and other pieces by the Flemish sculptor Michael Rysbrack, but the interior was gutted by fire in 2015.

As Lord Onslow he was a leading participant in an insurance business known as Onslow's Insurance or Onslow's Bubble, which secured incorporation under the Bubble Act as Royal Exchange Assurance Corporation.

The Onslow family seat remains Clandon Park, East and West Clandon, Surrey.

Clandon Park House and its 7-acre garden, was gifted to the Nation in 1956, a National Trust and this mansion and gardens were for the most part commissioned by him.

The senior branch of the Onslow family continues to own and manage their agricultural business and the Clandon Park parkland to this day. However, in the 18th and 19th centuries the family owned several thousand acres of farmland scattered across many villages in Surrey from which they derived an income.

According to research carried out under University College London's Legacies of British Slave-ownership project, Clandon House was built by Onslow possibly as a result of his wife's slavery-derived fortune. The slave plantation which Elizabeth inherited was her uncle Charles' Whitehall Plantation in St Thomas-in-the-East, Jamaica.

Onslow also had a townhouse at 11 Great Marlborough Street in central London; he leased it from 1712 and it remained in the family until c1808.

He had one son, Richard, who succeeded him on his death in 1740.

Parliament of England
Preceded by Thomas Turgis; Maurice Thompson	Member of Parliament for Gatton; 1702–1705; With: Maurice Thompson	Succeeded by Sir George Newland; Paul Docminique
Preceded by William Elson; Sir Thomas Littleton, Bt	Member of Parliament for Chichester; 1705–1707; With: Sir Thomas Littleton, Bt	Succeeded by Parliament of Great Britain
Parliament of Great Britain
Preceded by Parliament of England	Member of Parliament for Chichester; 1707–1708; With: Sir Thomas Littleton, Bt	Succeeded by Thomas Carr; Sir Richard Farington, Bt
Preceded by George Woodroffe; John Fulham	Member of Parliament for Haslemere; 1708; With: Theophilus Oglethorpe	Succeeded by Theophilus Oglethorpe; Sir Nicholas Carew
Preceded by John Ward; George Evelyn	Member of Parliament for Bletchingley; 1708–1715; With: George Evelyn	Succeeded by George Evelyn; Sir William Clayton
Preceded by Theophilus Oglethorpe; Sir John Clerke, Bt	Member of Parliament for Haslemere; 1713–1714; With: George Vernon	Succeeded by George Vernon; Sir Nicholas Carew
Preceded by Lord Guernsey; Sir Richard Onslow, Bt	Member of Parliament for Surrey; 1715–1717; With: Lord Guernsey	Succeeded by Lord Guernsey; Denzil Onslow
Political offices
Preceded by Unknown	Out-Ranger of Windsor Forest; 1715–1717	Succeeded by Denzil Onslow
Preceded by Richard Hampden	Teller of the Exchequer; 1718–1741	Succeeded by Horatio Walpole
Honorary titles
Preceded by The Lord Onslow	Lord Lieutenant of Surrey; 1717–1740	Succeeded by The Lord Onslow
Preceded by The Earl of Berkeley	Custos Rotulorum of Surrey; 1737–1740	Succeeded by The Lord Onslow
Peerage of Great Britain
Preceded by Richard Onslow	Baron Onslow; 1717–1740	Succeeded by Richard Onslow
