= George Grimes (English politician) =

English politician (1605–1657)

Sir George Grimes

Member of Parliament for Haslemere
- In office 1628–1629

Personal details
- Born: 1605
- Died: 1657 (aged 51–52)
- Spouse: Alice Lovell
- Parent(s): Thomas Grimes (father), Margaret More (mother)
- Relatives: George More (grandfather)
- Occupation: Politician
- Awards: Knighted at Theobalds (1628)

Sir George Grimes (1605–1657) was an English politician who sat in the House of Commons from 1628 to 1629. He supported the Royalist cause in the English Civil War.

Grimes was the son of Sir Thomas Grimes and his wife Margaret More, daughter of Sir George More of Loseley Park and was baptised on 10 February 1605. In 1628, he was elected Member of Parliament for Haslemere and sat until 1629 when King Charles decided to rule without parliament for eleven years. Grimes was knighted at Theobalds on 9 December 1628. He supported the King in the Civil War, describing himself as having "for a long time waited on His Majesty's person as his sworn servant."

Grimes died at about the age of 52 and was buried on 15 October 1657.

Grimes married Alice Lovell, daughter of Charles Lovell, of West Harling, Norfolk.

Parliament of England
Preceded by Francis Carew; Poynings More	Member of Parliament for Haslemere; 1628–1629; With: Sir Thomas Canon	Parliament suspended until 1640
