= Theophilus Oglethorpe Jr. =

Theophilus Oglethorpe, junior (11 March 1684 – c. 1737), of Westbrook Place, Godalming, was an English Tory politician, who sat in the House of Commons from 1708 to 1713.

He was educated at Eton College. Oglethorpe entered Parliament in 1708 as member for Haslemere, for which his father Sir Theophilus Oglethorpe and older brother Lewis had previously been MPs, and which was later represented by his younger brother James. He served in two parliaments, retiring in 1713.

Like his father, who had been equerry to James II and had gone into exile with him after the Glorious Revolution, Oglethorpe was a Jacobite sympathiser and shortly afterwards fled abroad to join the Old Pretender; his sister, Anne, was rumoured to be the Pretender's mistress. He was created Baron Oglethorpe of Oglethorpe in the Jacobite peerage on 20 December 1717 and remained at the court-in-exile at Saint Germain for the remainder of his life.

Parliament of Great Britain
Preceded by George Woodroffe and John Fulham	Member of Parliament for Haslemere; 1708–1713; With: Thomas Onslow 1708; Sir Nicholas Carew 1708–1710; Sir John Clerke 1710–1713	Succeeded by George Vernon and Thomas Onslow
