= Sir William More, 2nd Baronet =

English politician

Sir William More, 2nd Baronet (1644–1684) was an English politician who sat in the House of Commons in the second half of the 17th century.

He was the son of Poynings More of Loseley Park. In 1675 he won a by-election at Haslemere, sitting firstly with George Evelyn and then his uncle, James Gresham. He sat again from 1681 to 1685 with George Woodroffe.

== Notes ==
Parliament of England
Preceded by Thomas Morrice; Sir William Browne	Member of Parliament for Haslemere; 1675–1679; With: George Evelyn; James Gresham	Succeeded by Denzil Onslow
Preceded by Denzil Onslow	Member of Parliament for Haslemere; 1680–1681; With: George Woodroffe	Succeeded by George Vernon
Baronetage of England
Preceded by Poynings More	Baronet (of Loseley); 1642–1649	Dormant
