= Thomas Morrice =

English politician

Thomas Morrice was an English politician in the 17th century.

Morris was elected to the Cavalier Parliament and became Commissioner for Loyal and Indigent Officers in 1662. He died on 27 May 1675 and was buried at Westminster Abbey on 1 June that year.

Parliament of England
Preceded by Chaloner Chute	Member of Parliament for Haslemere; 20 May 1661 – 28 May 1675; With: George Evelyn	Succeeded by William More
