= Francis Carew =

English politician

Sir Francis Carew KB (1602–1649) was an English politician who sat in the House of Commons between 1624 and 1626.

Carew was the son of Sir Nicholas Throckmorton of Beddington, Surrey who changed his name to Carew in 1611. He matriculated at University College, Oxford on 30 April 1619, aged 16 and was awarded BA on 27 November 1621. He was admitted to the Inner Temple in 1620. In 1624, he was elected Member of Parliament for Haslemere. He was re-elected MP for Haslemere in 1625 and 1626 . He was appointed Knight of the Order of the Bath on 2 February 1626. In 1628, he was elected MP for Guildford but the election was declared void. He was elected MP for Bletchingley in 1640 but the election was declared void.

He married Susan Romney, a daughter of William and Rebecca Romney. Carew died at the age of about 46 and was buried on 9 April 1649.

Parliament of England
Preceded by Sir Thomas Grimes; Sir William Browne	Member of Parliament for Haslemere; 1624–1626; With: Poynings More	Succeeded by George Grimes; Sir Thomas Canon
