= Francis Leigh (died 1644) =

English politician

Sir Francis Leigh (bap. 6 Sep. 1590 – 13 December 1644) was an English politician who sat in the House of Commons in 1625.

Leigh was the son of Sir Oliph Leigh of Addington, Surrey. He matriculated at Trinity College, Oxford on 8 May 1607, aged 15. In 1610, he studied law at the Inner Temple. He was knighted in January 1613.

He was a justice of the peace for Surrey (1616-at least 1642), Kent (1627-at least 1642) and Middlesex (1630–39) and was appointed High Sheriff of Surrey and Sussex for 1621–22. He was a deputy lieutenant for Surrey by 1627 until at least 1631.

In 1625, he was elected member of parliament for Surrey.

He was a Gentleman of the Privy Chamber by 1625 until at least 1643.

Leigh died at the age of about 48 and was buried at Addington on 17 December 1644. He married twice: firstly Elizabeth, the daughter and heiress of William Mynterne of Thorpe, Surrey, with whom he had 3 sons (2 of whom predeceased him) and a daughter and secondly Christian, the daughter of Sir John Thynne of Longleat, Wiltshire, with whom he had 6 sons (of whom 2 predeceased him) and 2 daughters.

Parliament of England
Preceded by Sir Robert More; Sir Thomas Grimes	Member of Parliament for Surrey; 1625; With: Sir George More	Succeeded by Sir George More; Sir Francis Vincent
