= William Eliot =

William Eliot may refer to:

- William Greenleaf Eliot (1811–1887), American educator, Unitarian clergyman, and founder of Washington University
- William Eliot, 2nd Earl of St Germans (1767–1845), British diplomat and politician
- William Eliot, 4th Earl of St Germans (1829–1881), British diplomat and Liberal politician
- William Eliot (MP) (1586–1650), English politician
- William Havard Eliot (1796–1831), architect and builder of the Tremont House in Massachusetts

== See also ==
- William Elliot (disambiguation)
- Billy Elliot (disambiguation)
- William Elliott (disambiguation)
