= Sir Cleave More, 2nd Baronet =

Sir Cleave More, 2nd Baronet (5 March 1664 – 1730), of Bank Hall, Walton, Lancashire, was a Whig politician who sat in the House of Commons from 1709 to 1710.

More was the fifth, but eldest surviving son of Sir Edward More, 1st Baronet, of Bank Hall Walton and his wife Dorothy Fenwick, daughter of Sir William Fenwick of Meldon, Northumberland. He succeeded his father in the baronetcy in October 1678. He was educated at Westminster School; and matriculated at Christ Church, Oxford in 1682. In 1691, he married Anne Edmunds, daughter. of John Edmunds of Cumberlow, Hertfordshire.

At the 1708 British general election, More stood for Parliament as a Whig at Bramber but was defeated in the poll. However he petitioned and was seated as Member of Parliament for Bramber on 15 January 1709. He spent much of his time in Parliament taking forward a scheme to provide a water supply for Liverpool. He voted for the naturalisation of the Palatines in 1709 and for the impeachment of Henry Sacheverell in 1710. He did not stand at the 1710 British general election.

More died at St Anne's, Aldersgate, in London on 3 March 1730 leaving one son, Joseph, who succeeded to the baronetcy.

Parliament of Great Britain
Preceded by The Viscount Windsor; William Shippen	Member of Parliament for Bramber; 1709 –1710; With: William Hale	Succeeded by The Viscount Windsor; Andrews Windsor
Baronetage of England
Preceded by Sir Edward More, 1st Baronet	Baronet (of More Hall); 1678–1730	Succeeded by Sir Joseph Edmonds Moore, 3rd Baronet
