= Montague Blundell, 1st Viscount Blundell =

British politician

Montague Blundell, 1st Viscount Blundell (19 June 1689 – 19 August 1756), known as Sir Montague Blundell, Bt, between 1707 and 1720, was a British politician who sat in the House of Commons from 1715 to 1722.

Blundell was the son of Sir Francis Blundell, 3rd Baronet, by Anne Ingoldsby, daughter of Sir Henry Ingoldsby, 1st Baronet and Anne Waller. He succeeded his father in the baronetcy in 1707. In 1715 he was returned to parliament as one of two representatives for Haslemere, a seat he held until 1722. In 1720 he was elevated to the Peerage of Ireland as Baron Blundell, of Edenderry in the King's County, and Viscount Blundell.

Lord Blundell married Mary Chetwynd, daughter of John Chetwynd, of Grendon, Warwickshire, in 1709. He died in August 1756, aged 67. He had no surviving sons and all his titles died with him. Lord Blundell had secured the permission of the House of Lords in 1742 to pass his estates to his daughter Mary. Lady Blundell died in December 1756.

Their daughter the Honourable Mary Blundell married William Trumbull. They were the grandparents of Mary Hill, Marchioness of Downshire.

Parliament of Great Britain
Preceded by George Vernon; Nicholas Carew	Member of Parliament for Haslemere; 1715–1722; With: Nicholas Carew	Succeeded by James Oglethorpe; Peter Burrell
Baronetage of Ireland
Preceded by Francis Blundell	Baronet; 1707–1756	Extinct
Peerage of Ireland
New creation	Viscount Blundell; 1720–1756	Extinct
