= William Eliot (MP) =

English politician

Member of Parliament for Haslemere
- In office 1640–1640 Serving with Sir John Jacques, Bt
- Preceded by: Parliament suspended since 1629
- Succeeded by: John Goodwin; Sir Poynings More, Bt

Personal details
- Born: c. 1586
- Died: 7 December 1650 (aged 63–64)
- Spouse(s): Mary Goring (m. 1616; died 1620) Joan d'Ewes (m. 1620; died 1648)
- Parent(s): Lawrence Eliot; Mary Barker
- Education: Queen's College, Oxford

Sir William Eliot (c. 1586 – 7 December 1650) was an English politician who sat in the House of Commons in 1640.

== Early life ==
Eliot was the son of Lawrence Eliot of Busbridge, Surrey and Mary (née Barker) Eliot.

He matriculated at Queen's College, Oxford on 15 October 1602 aged 15. He was a student of Middle Temple in 1605.

== Career ==
In 1618, Eliot inherited the estate at Busbridge, and was knighted on 1 February 1621.

In April 1640, Eliot was elected Member of Parliament for Haslemere in the Short Parliament.

== Personal life ==
In 1616, Eliot married Mary Goring, the daughter of George Goring, MP, and Anne (née Denny) Goring. Her brother, George Goring was created the Earl of Norwich.

After the death of his first wife in 1620, he married Joan d'Ewes, a daughter of Paul d'Ewes, of Milden, Suffolk, one of the Six Clerks in Chancery, and his first wife Cecelia Simonds (daughter and heiress of Sir Richard Simonds of Coaxden), on 7 February 1620. Her brother was Sir Simonds d'Ewes, 1st Baronet. Together, they were the parents of a son:

- Sir William Eliot (c. 1624-c. 1697), who married Elizabeth Wray, a daughter of Sir Christopher Wray and sister to Sir William Wray, 1st Baronet and Sir Drury Wray, 9th Baronet. After her death in 1658, he married Barbara Godfrey.

Lady Eliot died on 6 December 1648. Sir William died in 1650 at the age of 64. In 1681, his son was knighted KB William Eliot, of Godalming, Surrey at Hampton Court Palace.

=== Descendants ===
Through his son William's first marriage, he was a grandfather of Albinia Eliot (1658–1717), who married George Courthope, son of George Courthope, MP for Sussex and East Grinstead, in 1684.

Parliament of England
Parliament suspended since 1629	Member of Parliament for Haslemere; 1640; With: Sir John Jacques, Bt	Succeeded by John Goodwin; Sir Poynings More, Bt
