= Hugh Hare (MP, died 1620) =

Member of the Parliament of England

Hugh Hare (c. 1542–1620) was an English politician in the 16th century.

Hare was born in London and baptised on 20 April 1544 at St Mary le Bow. He was admitted to the Inner Temple on 5 August 1566, named Bencher, and Treasurer of the Inner Temple Nov.1602-Jan.1604. He was M.P. for Haslemere from 1588 to 1589.

Parliament of Great Britain
| Preceded by William Morgan | Member of Parliament for Haslemere; 1588–1589; With: John Haselrigge | Succeeded by Adrian Stoughton |
