= Signatories to the Ladies' Petition for the Establishment of the Foundling Hospital =

In 1730 Thomas Coram approached aristocratic women with a petition to support the establishment of a Foundling Hospital, which he would present to King George II.

The women who signed were of aristocratic backgrounds, and Coram kept a list in his pocket memorandum book, captioned 'An Exact Account when each Lady of Charity Signed their Declaration'. In several cases, he had already approached the women's husbands several years earlier, and been turned away. Their involvement is widely regarded as the gateway to wider support of his philanthropic cause. In an essay in the catalogue of an exhibition celebrating women's roles in the Foundling Hospital, Elizabeth Einberg states that:

"Coram could see that securing the approval of a group of right-thinking women, of wives and dowagers at the pinnacle of society would highlight the Christian, virtuous and humanitarian aspects of such an endeavour and make it socially acceptable. In the events, it became not only that, but one of the most fashionable charities of the day."

These female signatories are listed here in chronological order of date of their signature:

Signatories to the Ladies' Petition for the Establishment of the Foundling Hospital
Name	Title at the time of Signature	Date of Signature	Image
Charlotte Seymour	Duchess of Somerset	9 March 1729	
Ann Vaughan	Duchess of Bolton	22 April 1729	
Henrietta Needham	Dowager Duchess of Bolton	25 April 1729	
Sarah Lennox	Duchess of Richmond	22 December 1729	
Isabella Montagu	Duchess of Manchester	6 January 1730	
Ann Russell	Duchess of Bedford	7 January 1730	
Elizabeth Knight	Baroness Onslow	6 April 1730	
Anne Pierrepoint	Dowager Baroness Torrington	14 April 1730	
Frances Byron	Baroness Byron	14 April 1730	
Selina Shirley	Countess of Huntingdon	21 April 1730	
Juliana Hele	Duchess of Leeds	24 April 1730	
Frances Finch	Countess of Winchilsea and Nottingham	25 April 1730	
Frances Hales	Countess of Lichfield	27 April 1730	
Dorothy Boyle	Countess of Burlington	19 May 1730	
Elizabeth Brudenell	Countess of Cardigan	19 May 1730	
Frances Thynne	Countess of Hertford	26 May 1730	
Mary Tufton	Countess of Harold	6 November 1733	
Anne Lennox	Countess of Albemarle	6 November 1734	
Anne Weldon Barnard	Baroness Trevor	2 December 1734	
Anne King	Dowager Baroness Ockham	21 January 1735	
Margaret Cavendish Harley	Duchess of Portland	7 May 1735	

In 2018 the Foundling Museum held an exhibition to raise awareness of the role of women in founding and running the Foundling Hospital, called "Ladies of Quality and Distinction". By their actions, these women succeeded.
