= Elizabeth Onslow, Baroness Onslow =

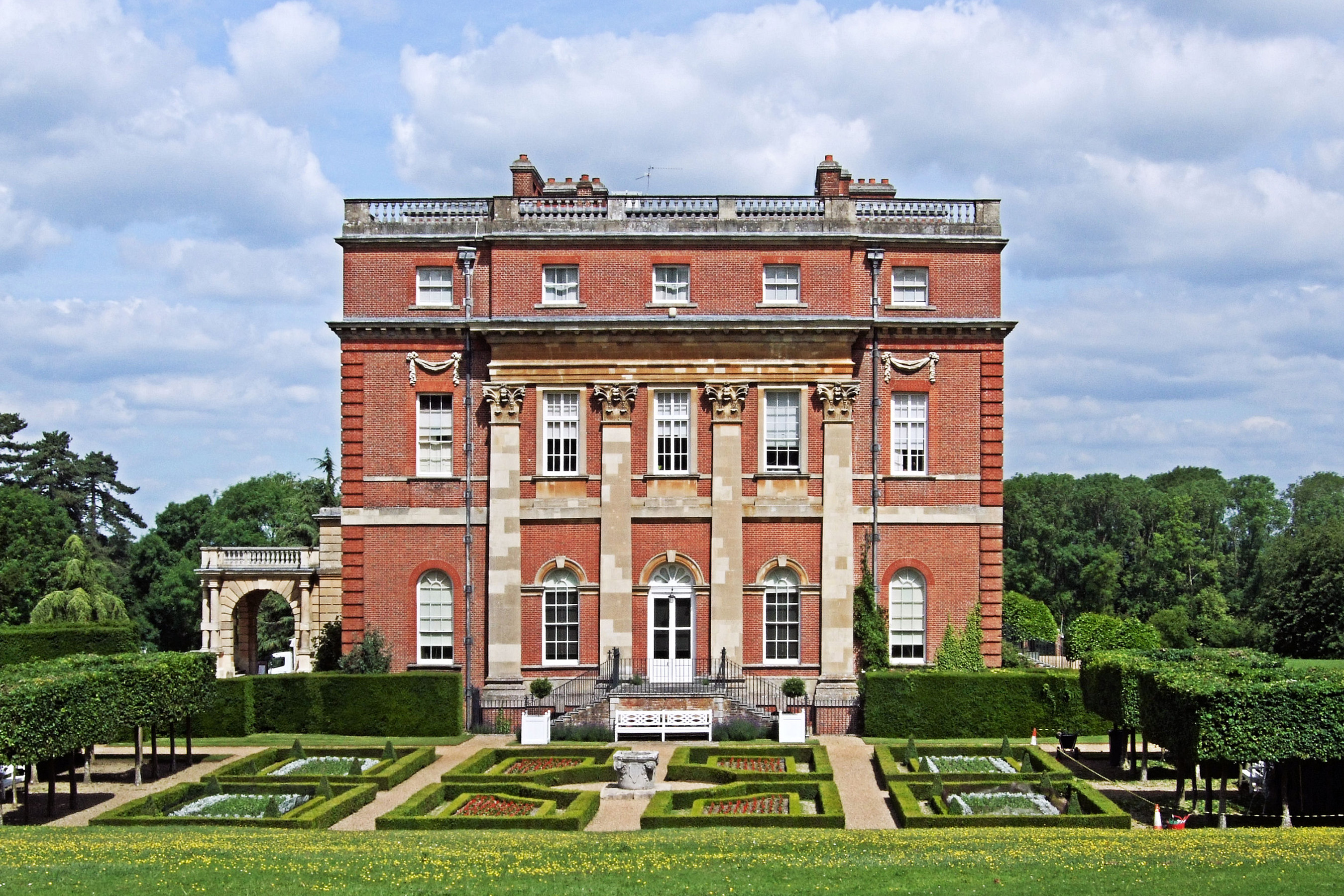
Elizabeth's inherited fortune possibly contributed to transform her husband's family home Clandon Park House from a large Manor House to a grand English country house in the Palladian style.

Elizabeth Onslow (1692 – 19 April 1731) was an English aristocrat and social reformer.

She was the daughter of the merchant John Knight, and niece to Colonel Charles Knight, both of whom derived great fortunes from trading in Jamaica. She was heir to both men, whose wealth derived from trading and slave plantations in Jamaica.

She was married to Thomas Onslow, 2nd Baron Onslow, at St Paul's Cathedral on 17 November 1708. He may have used her great wealth to contribute to the rebuilding of his family home, Clandon Park House, as a fashionable Palladian-style mansion.

She was one of a group of noblewomen who signed their names to the Ladies' petition for Thomas Coram to establish the London Foundling Hospital. Gillian Wagner speculates that Coram was introduced to her through her husband's cousin Arthur Onslow, who was Speaker of the House of Commons. Coram called her 'a woman of the truest goodness of mind and heart that I ever knew'. She signed the petition on 8 April 1730.
