= James Gresham (MP) =

English politician

James Gresham (born about 1617 – d Haslemere 1689) was an English politician in the second half of the 17th century.

Gresham was born in Fulham in about 1617. He came to live in Haslemere in 1650. He was called to the bar in 1652. He became a JP in 1660 and in 1676 he presented an almshouse to the town.

Parliament of England
Preceded by John Westbrooke	Member of Parliament for Haslemere; March 1661 – May 1661; With: Chaloner Chute (died 1666)	Succeeded by George Evelyn
Preceded by George Evelyn	Member of Parliament for Haslemere; March 1679 – July 1679; With: William More	Succeeded by Denzil Onslow
