= William Morgan (died 1602) =

Member of the Parliament of England

William Morgan was an English politician in the 16th century.

Rythe was born in Chilworth, Surrey. He was a landowner and commander of the local musters. Morgan was M.P. for Haslemere from 1586 to 1587. He died on 10 December 1602 and is buried on St Martha's Hill.

Parliament of England
Preceded by Christopher Rithe	Member of Parliament for Haslemere; 1584–1586; With: William Campion	Succeeded by Hugh Hare
