= Sir John Clerke, 4th Baronet =

Sir John Clerke (1683-1727) was an English politician for a Surrey constituency in the early eighteenth century.

Clerke was the son of William Clerke, 3rd Baronet. He was elected the Tory M.P. for Haslemere in 1710; and tried to contest the seat in 1713 but was not backed.

== Notes ==
Parliament of Great Britain
Preceded by Nicholas Carew	Member of Parliament for Haslemere; 1710–1713; With: Theophilus Oglethorpe Jr.	Succeeded by Thomas Onslow
