= Sir Nicholas Carew, 1st Baronet =

Sir Nicholas Carew, 1st Baronet (6 February 1687 – 18 March 1727), of Beddington, near Croydon was a landowner and Whig politician who sat in the House of Commons between 1708 and 1727.

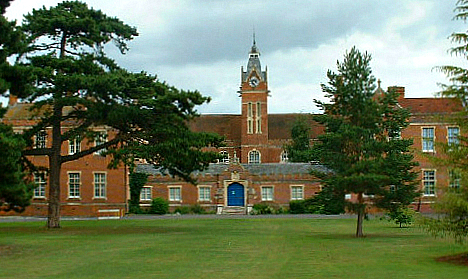
Beddington Hall – seat of the Carew family

Carew was only surviving son and heir of Sir Francis Carew (died 1689) and his wife Anne Boteler, daughter of William Boteler. His father was a great-grandson of Sir Nicholas Throckmorton, who had changed his name to Carew on inheriting the Beddington estate from his maternal uncle, Sir Francis Carew (died 1611). Carew was two years old when he succeeded to Beddington on the death of his father aged 26 on 29 September 1689. By this time the house was in a state of neglect. He was admitted at St. Catharine's College, Cambridge in April 1703. He married Elizabeth Hackett, daughter of Nicholas Hackett of North Crawley, Buckinghamshire (with £2,000) on 2 February 1709.

Carew's uncle Nicholas was politically active, tried unsuccessfully to enter Parliament and provided encouragement to his nephew. Carew was returned unopposed as Member of Parliament for Haslemere at a by-election on 13 December 1708. He made little impression in Parliament and lost his seat at the 1710 general election. He did not stand at the 1713 general election, but was returned for Haslemere again at a by-election on 18 March 1714. He was created a baronet on 11 January 1715. At the 1715 general election he was elected, after a scrutiny of the poll, as Whig MP for Haslemere. He supported the Administration, with the exception of the Peerage Bill. At the 1722 general election, he changed seats and was elected MP for Surrey.

Carew died at the age of 40 on 18 March 1727, just before the general election. He and his wife had two sons and two daughters. He was succeeded in the baronetcy by his second but only surviving son, Nicholas Hacket Carew. His widow married William Chetwynd, a former MP for Wooton Bassett. She died in February 1740 at Marlborough, Wiltshire, while travelling to the spa town of Bath, Somerset.

Parliament of Great Britain
Preceded by Thomas Onslow; Theophilus Oglethorpe	Member of Parliament for Haslemere; 1708–1710; With: Theophilus Oglethorpe	Succeeded by Sir John Clerke, Bt; Theophilus Oglethorpe
Preceded by Thomas Onslow; George Vernon	Member of Parliament for Haslemere; 1714–1722; With: George Vernon 1714-1715; Sir Montague Blundell, Bt 1715-1722	Succeeded by James Oglethorpe; Peter Burrell
Preceded by John Walter; Sir William Scawen	Member of Parliament for Surrey; 1722– 1727; With: John Walter	Succeeded by John Walter; Thomas Scawen
Baronetage of Great Britain
New creation	Baronet (of Beddington); 1715–1727	Succeeded by Nicholas Hacket Carew
