= Marlyon Rithe =

Member of the Parliament of England

Marlyon Rithe was an English politician in the 16th Century.

Rythe was born in Twickenham. He was a Lincoln's Inn lawyer and M.P. for Haslemere from 1584 to 1586. Rithe was buried at Twickenham on 30 May 1627.

Parliament of England
Preceded by first incumbent	Member of Parliament for Haslemere; 1584-1586; With: Christopher Rithe	Succeeded by William Campion
