= John Haselrigge =

Member of the Parliament of England

John Haselrigge (d 1612) was an English politician in the 16th Century.

Hare was born in Noseley and was the brother in law of the English jurist, politician and diplomat Bartholomew Clerke. He was M.P. for Haslemere from 1588 to 1589.

Parliament of England
Preceded by William Campion	Member of Parliament for Haslemere; 1588–1589; With: Hugh Hare	Succeeded by Nicholas Saunders
