= Thomas Canon =

Welsh antiquarian and politician

Sir Thomas Canon (born 1567) was a Welsh antiquarian and politician who sat in the House of Commons from 1625 to 1629.

Canon was the son of John Canon of Kilgetty. He matriculated at Jesus College, Oxford on 5 February 1585, at the age of 17. He was sometime of Clifford's Inn and became a student of Lincoln's Inn in 1593. On 13 April 1603, he was appointed J.P. and of the Quorum, Pembrokeshire. He was described as " a great antiquarian, and a man of learning, enterprize, and fortune". In 1619, he was Surveyor General of Crown lands in Wales in and by deed of partnership dated 12 March 1623 was concerned with his father-in-law in an attempt to work a silver mine at St Elwys, Pembrokeshire. He took great interest in preserving the monumental brasses in St David's Cathedral. On 30 June 1623 he received a knighthood. He was appointed Deputy Constable of Haverfordwest Castle by the Constable Thomas Acton.

In 1625, Canon was elected Member of Parliament for Haverfordwest. He was re-elected MP for Haverfordwest in 1626. In 1628 he was elected MP for Haslemere and sat until 1629 when King Charles decided to rule without parliament for eleven years.

Canon married a daughter of John Voyle.

Parliament of England
Preceded by Lewis Powell	Member of Parliament for Haverfordwest; 1625–1626	Succeeded by Sir James Perrot
Preceded by Francis Carew; Poynings More	Member of Parliament for Haslemere; 1628–1629; With: George Grimes	Parliament suspended until 1640
