= Edmund Bowyer (died 1627) =

English lawyer, landowner and politician

- Born: 12 May 1552; London, England
- Died: 18 February 1627 (aged 74); London, England
- Occupation: Politician

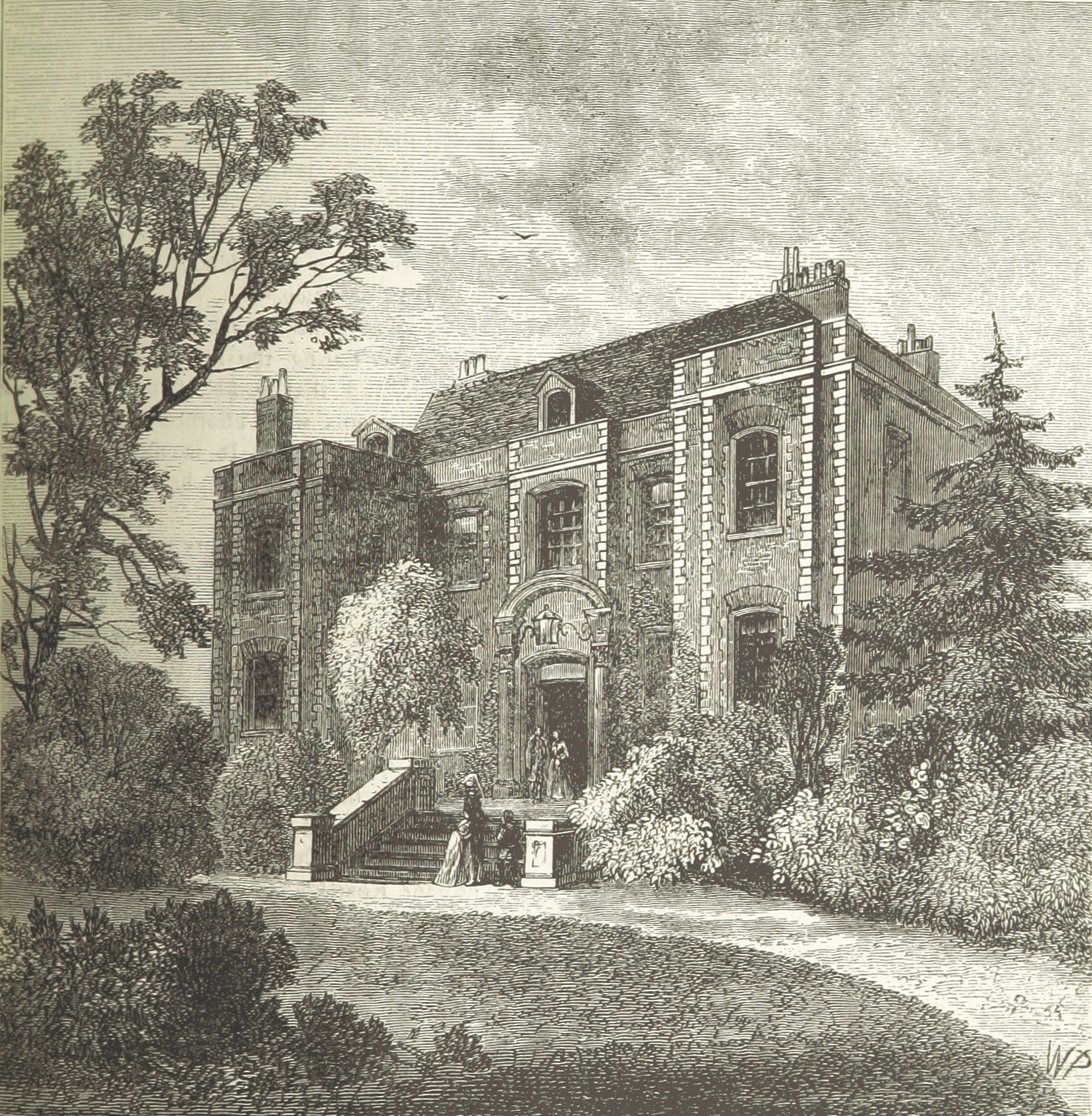
Bowyer's House in Camberwell on land purchased by him in 1583

Sir Edmund Bowyer (12 May 1552 – 18 February 1627) was an English lawyer, landowner and politician who sat in the House of Commons at various times between 1593 and 1624.

== Early life ==
Bowyer was the eldest son of John Bowyer of Camberwell and his second wife, Elizabeth Draper, daughter of Robert Draper, gentleman, of Camberwell, Surrey, Page of the Jewels to King Henry VIII. He was admitted at Lincoln's Inn in 1569 and succeeded to the estates of his father in about 1570. He was called to the bar in 1577. From 1582 he was J.P. for Surrey and in 1583, Bowyer added to his Surreyestate by buying one-fifth of the manor of Camberwell Buckingham.

== Career ==
In 1593, Bowyer was elected Member of Parliament for Morpeth. He was elected MP for Southwark in 1597. From 1600 to 1601 he was High Sheriff of Surrey and Sussex. He was knighted in 1603. In 1604 he was elected MP for Surrey. He was Deputy Lieutenant of Surrey by 1614 when he was re-elected MP for Surrey. He was one of the governors of the free grammar school at Camberwell, which was founded under letters patent granted in September 1615. In September 1616 he attended the consecration of Dulwich College after selling land to the founder. In 1624 he was elected MP for Gatton.

== Death ==
Bowyer died at the age of 74.

== Personal life ==
Bowyer married Katherine Bynd, daughter of William Bynd of Washington, Sussex in 1573. Bowyer left his estates in Camberwell to his nephew Edmund who was later MP for Gatton.

Parliament of England
| Preceded by Robert Carey; Francis Tyndale | Member of Parliament for Morpeth; 1593; With: Francis Tyndale | Succeeded by Robert Printis; Thomas Carleton |
| Preceded by | Member of Parliament for Southwark; 1597 | Succeeded by Zachariah Locke; Matthew Dale |
| Preceded by Lord Howard of Effingham; Sir George More | Member of Parliament for Surrey; 1604–1614; With: Sir Robert More 1604–1611; Sir George More | Succeeded by Sir George More; Sir Nicholas Carew |
| Preceded by Sir Thomas Gresham; Thomas Bludder | Member of Parliament for Gatton; 1624; With: Samuel Owfield | Succeeded by Sir Charles Howard; Sir Thomas Crewe |
