= William Campion (died 1615) =

Member of the Parliament of England

William Campion was an English politician in the 16th Century.

Campion was the son of Henry Campion, a London mercer and Margaret, daughter of William Cordell of Long Melford, Suffolk. He was educated at Pembroke College, Oxford. and Lincoln's Inn. He purchased the manor of Combwell from Sir Alexander Culpeper early in the reign of Elizabeth I. He was M.P. for Haslemere from 1586 to 1587.

He married Rachel, daughter of Richard Duffield of London. They had 3 sons and 2 daughters. His sons William and Henry married two of the co-heirs of Sir William Stone (d. 1607).

Parliament of England
Preceded by Marlyon Rithe	Member of Parliament for Haslemere; 1586–1587; With: William Morgan	Succeeded by John Haselrigge
