= Sir John Jacques, 1st Baronet =

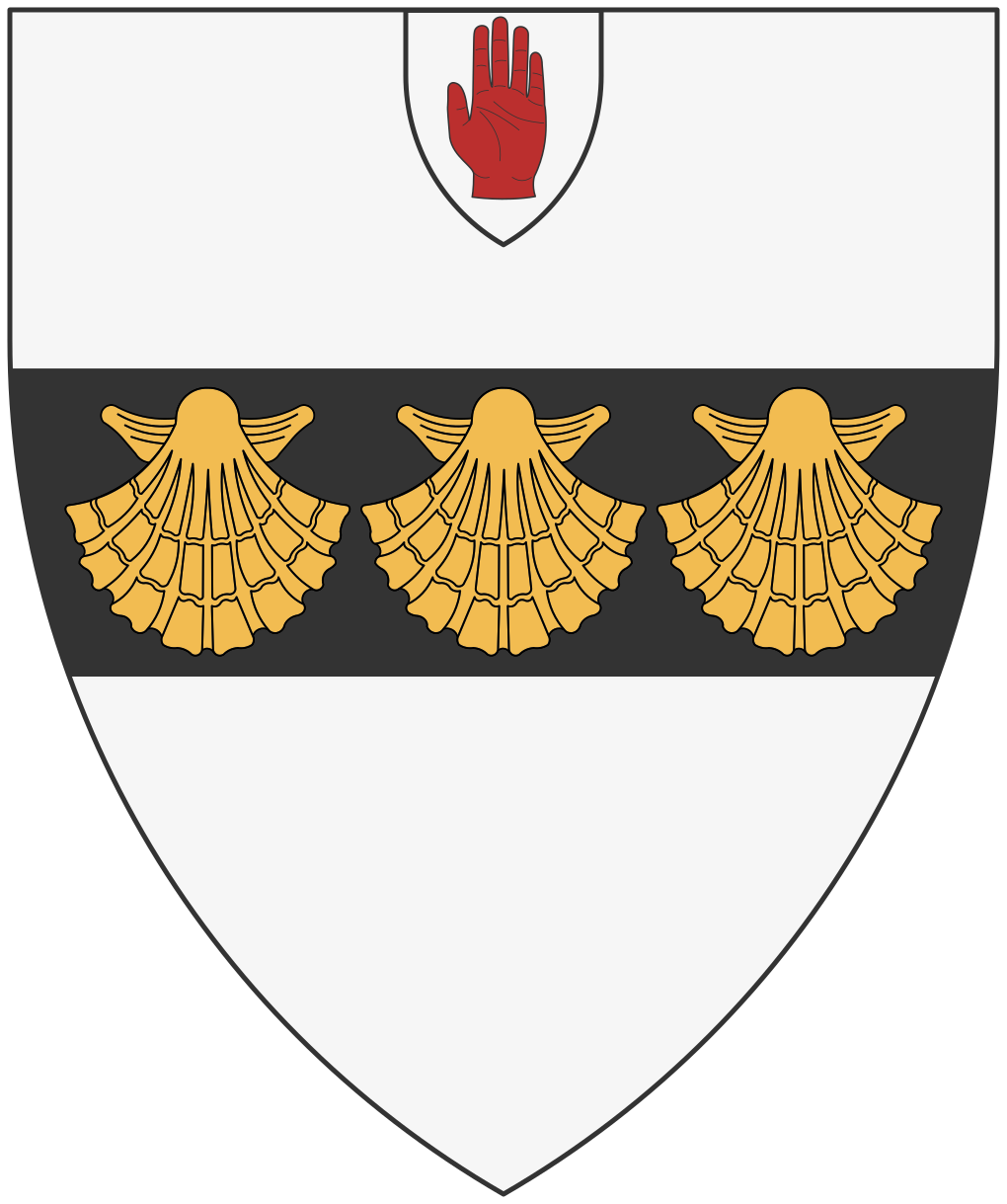
The coat of arms of Jacques of Middlesex, Baronets.

Sir John Jacques, 1st Baronet (died 1650) was an English politician who sat in the House of Commons in 1640.

Jacques was the son of John Jacques and his wife Elizabeth Cowper daughter of John Cowper, alderman and sheriff of London. He was created Baronet, of the County of Middlesex, by King Charles I on 2 September 1628.

In April 1640, Jacques was elected Member of Parliament for Haslemere in the Short Parliament.

Jacques married Mary but died without issue in 1650 when the baronetcy became extinct.

Parliament of England
Vacant Parliament suspended since 1629	Member of Parliament for Haslemere; 1640; With: Sir William Eliot	Succeeded by Sir Poynings More, 1st Baronet; John Goodwin
Baronetage of England
New creation	Baronet (of Middlesex); 1628–1661	Extinct
