= Viscount Blundell =

Title in the Peerage of Ireland

Viscount Blundell was a title in the Peerage of Ireland. It was created in 1720 for Sir Montague Blundell, 4th Baronet, Member of Parliament for Haslemere between 1715 and 1722. He was made Baron Blundell, of Edenderry in the King's County, at the same time, also in the Peerage of Ireland. He had no surviving male issue and the titles became extinct on his death in 1756. The Blundell Baronetcy was created in the Baronetage of Ireland on 13 October 1620 for Sir Francis Blundell, Vice-Treasurer and Receiver-General of Ireland. He was succeeded by his son, the second Baronet. He represented both Dingle and Philipstown in the Irish House of Commons. His son, the third Baronet, sat in the Irish Parliament as the representative for King's County. He was succeeded by his son, the aforementioned fourth Baronet, who was elevated to the peerage in 1722. Viscount Blundell was Churchwarden of St George's, Hanover Square, London for the year 1738 – his tenure is listed in the church.

== Blundell baronets (1620) ==
- Sir Francis Blundell, 1st Baronet (1579–1625)
- Sir George Blundell, 2nd Baronet (died 1675)
- Sir Francis Blundell, 3rd Baronet (1643–1707)
- Sir Montague Blundell, 4th Baronet (1689–1756) (created Viscount Blundell in 1720)

== Viscounts Blundell (1720) ==
- Montague Blundell, 1st Viscount Blundell (1689–1756)
  - Hon. Montague Blundell (died 1733)

== Sources ==
- Leigh Rayment's Peerage Pages
