= Anne King, Baroness King =

Welsh aristocrat and philanthropist

Anne King (c. 1688/9 – 1 July 1767) was a Welsh aristocrat and philanthropist.

Anne was the daughter of Richard Seys (or Seyes) of Boverton Court, Glamorgan, Wales. Her dowry was estimated to be at least £4000 (and some sources thought as much as £10,000) on the occasion of her marriage.

She married Peter King, a lawyer and politician who would later be made 1st Baron King, in September 1704. The couple had six children, and four of their sons acceded to their father's barony:

1. Hon. Elizabeth King
2. Hon. Ann King
3. John King, 2nd Lord King, Baron of Ockham (13 Jan 1706 - 10 Feb 1740)
4. Peter King, 3rd Lord King, Baron of Ockham (13 Mar 1708/9 - 22 Mar 1754)
5. William King, 4th Lord King, Baron of Ockham (15 Apr 1711 - 16 Apr 1767)
6. Thomas King, 5th Lord King, Baron of Ockham (19 Mar 1712 - 4 Apr 1779)

The family home was at Ockham, Surrey, where Anne's husband was buried after his death on 22 July 1734, the result of a series of strokes.

She was one of the aristocratic female signatories to Thomas Coram's petition to King George II to establish the Foundling Hospital. She signed on 21 January 1735.

She died on 1 July 1767.
