= Billy Elliot (disambiguation) =

Billy Elliot is a 2000 film produced by the BBC.

Billy Elliot or Elliott may also refer to:

== Entertainment ==
- Bill Elliot (rock musician), member of Splinter and the Elastic Oz Band
- Billy Elliot the Musical, 2005 musical based on the film

== Sports ==
- Billy Elliot (jockey) (died 1941), Australian jockey who rode Phar Lap
- William Elliot (rugby union) (1867–1958), New Zealand footballer
- Billy Elliott (footballer) (1925–2008), English footballer and manager
- Billy Elliott (footballer, born 1961), English footballer see List of AFC Bournemouth players (1–24 appearances)

== Other uses ==
- Billy Elliot (RHC) (1964–1995), Northern Ireland loyalist, leading member of the Red Hand Commando
- Billy Elliot (UDA), senior member of the Ulster Defence Association; East Belfast brigadier

== See also ==
- Bill Elliott (disambiguation)
- William Elliot (disambiguation)
- William Eliot (disambiguation)
