= William Browne (MP for Haslemere) =

English politician

Sir William Browne (c.1564 – 11 March 1637) of Chichester, Sussex and Walcott, Northamptonshire was an English politician who sat in the House of Commons between 1614 and 1622.

Browne was eldest son of John Browne of Kirdford, Sussex. He matriculated from Trinity College, Cambridge at Easter 1579. He was possibly admitted at Inner Temple in November 1579. In 1614, he was elected Member of Parliament for Haslemere. He was re-elected MP for Haslemere in 1621.

Parliament of England
Preceded by Edward Fraunceys; William Jackson	Member of Parliament for Haslemere; 1614–1622; With: Sir Thomas Grimes	Succeeded by Francis Carew; Poynings More
