= George Vernon (MP, died 1692) =

English politician

Sir George Vernon JP (c. 1630 – 1692) was an English politician who sat in the House of Commons in the second half of the 17th century.

== Early life ==
Vernon was born in Farnham as the eldest son of Henry Vernon of Farnham by Joan Winter, daughter of John Winter of Preshaw, Corhampton. His younger brother was Sir Thomas Vernon.

== Career ==
He was a JP and a Commissioner for Assessment; and a Major of Militia.

Vernon was knighted on 6 November 1681.

== Personal life ==
By 1659, Vernon was married Elizabeth Kirkham, daughter and heiress of Roger Kirkham of Cheshunt, Hertfordshire. Before her death, they had two sons and two daughters. He married, by license dated 19 April 1676, Anne (née Parish) Jefferies, daughter of Parish of Brentford, Middlesex and widow of Francis Jefferies, vintner, of Westminster.

== Notes ==
Parliament of England
Preceded by William More	Member of Parliament for Haslemere; 1685–1687; With: George Woodroffe	Succeeded by White Tichborne
