= Thomas Grimes =

English politician

Sir Thomas Grimes (also Crymes, Grymes or Grahme; 20 February 1574 – 28 April 1644) was an English politician who sat in the House of Commons between 1614 and 1624.

Grimes was the son of Thomas Grimes, citizen and haberdasher of London and of Peckham and his wife Jane Muschamp daughter and co-heir of Thomas Muschamp, of Peckham. He was knighted at Hanworth, Middlesex on 2 June 1603. He was J.P. and Deputy Lieutenant of Surrey. In 1614, he was elected member of parliament for Haslemere. He was re-elected MP for Haslemere in 1621. In 1624, he was elected MP for Surrey.

Grimes married Margaret, daughter of Sir George More, of Loseley Park. Sir Thomas Grimes had three daughters: Mary, Margaret, and Jane, and three sons: George, Thomas, and Richard. He was succeeded by his eldest son Sir George Grimes.

Parliament of England
Preceded by Edward Fraunceys; William Jackson	Member of Parliament for Haslemere; 1614–1622; With: Sir William Browne	Succeeded by Francis Carew; Poynings More
Preceded by Sir George More; Sir Nicholas Carew	member of parliament for Surrey; 1624; With: Sir Robert More	Succeeded by Sir George More; Sir Francis Leigh
