= Robert More (MP, born 1581) =

English politician (1581–1626)

Sir Robert More (21 May 1581 – February 1626) was an English politician who sat in the House of Commons from 1601.

More was the eldest son of Sir George More of Loseley and his first wife Anne Poynings, daughter of Sir Adrian Poynings. He entered Corpus Christi College, Oxford in 1595 and was awarded BA in 1598. In 1600 he entered the Inner Temple, and also became with his father joint keeper of Farnham Little Park.

In 1601, More was elected Member of Parliament for Guildford. He was knighted between 17 October 1601 and 28 February 1604. He was joint constable with his father of Farnham Castle from about 1603 to 1608 and probably became a gentleman pensioner early in the reign of King James. In 1604 he was elected MP for Surrey. He was a J.P. for Surrey during the reign of James I. In 1614 he was elected MP for Guildford again. He was a Deputy Lieutenant of Surrey by 1619. In 1621 he was re-elected MP for Guildford. He was elected MP for Surrey again in 1624 and was elected MP for Guildford again in 1625.

More died on 2 or 10 February 1626 at the age of 44 and was outlived by his father. He was buried in the Loseley chapel at St Nicholas’s, Guildford.

More married Frances Lennard, daughter of Sampson Lennard and his wife Margaret Fiennes, 11th Baroness Dacre. They had six sons and five daughters.

Parliament of England
Preceded by William More; Robert Southwell	Member of Parliament for Guildford; 1601; With: William Jackson	Succeeded by Sir George More; George Austen
Preceded by Sir George More; Lord Howard of Effingham	Member of Parliament for Surrey; 1604–1611; With: Sir Edmund Bowyer	Succeeded by Sir George More; Sir Edmund Bowyer
Preceded by Sir George More	Member of Parliament for Guildford; 1621–22; With: John Murrey	Succeeded by Sir George More; Nicholas Stoughton
Preceded by Sir George More; Sir Nicholas Carew	Member of Parliament for Surrey; 1624; With: Sir Thomas Grimes	Succeeded by Sir George More; Sir Francis Leigh
