= William Elliott (painter) =

English painter

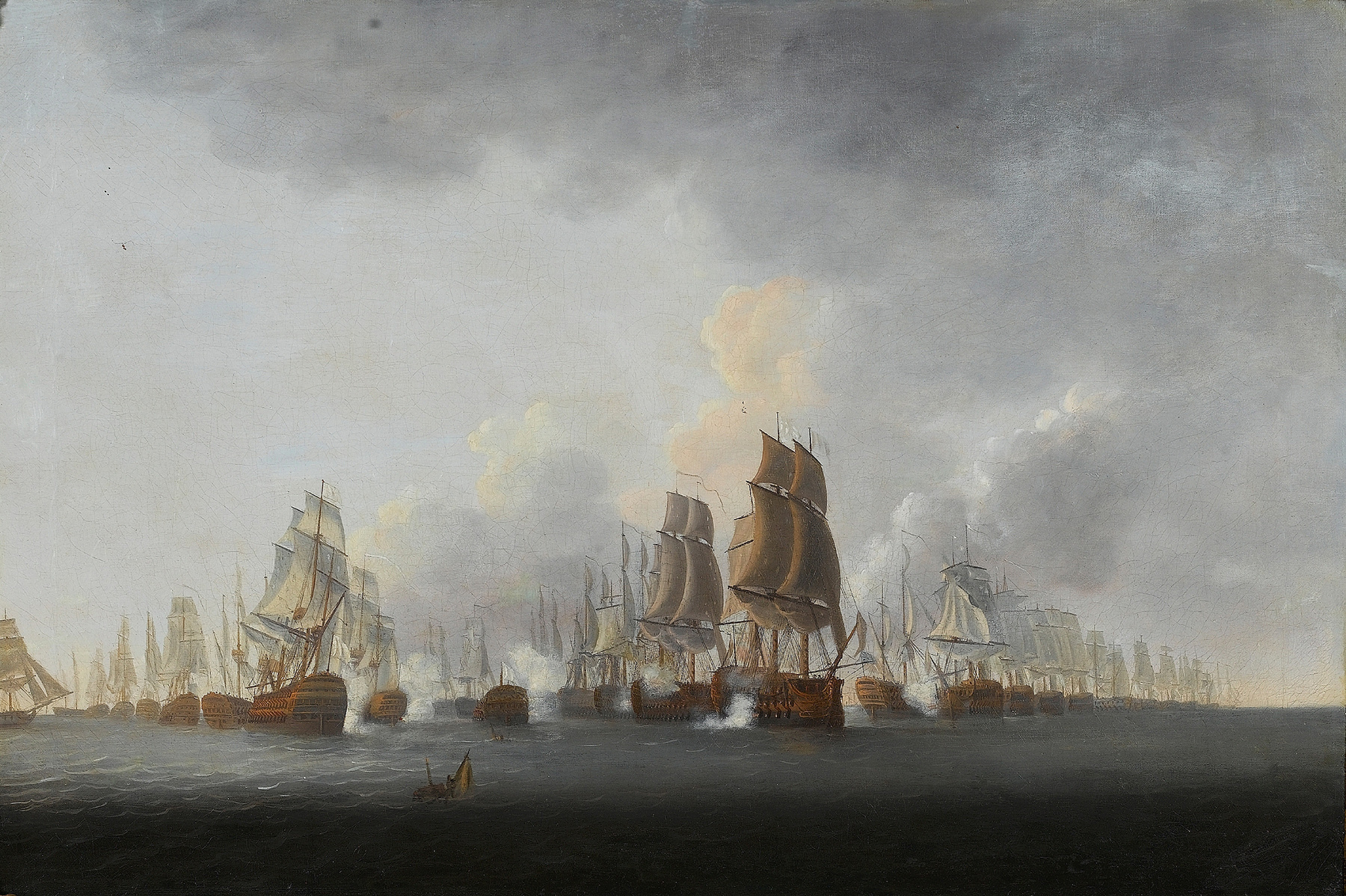
Painting by Elliot depicting the Battle of the Saintes

William Elliott (active 1774–1810) was a lieutenant in the Royal Navy and marine painter.

Elliott gained some repute from his paintings of the naval actions between 1780 and 1790. He first appears as an exhibitor in 1774 at the Free Society of Artists, with 'A Perspective View of the European Factory at Canton in China,' and 'A View of the Green, &c. at Calcutta in Bengal.' At the Royal Academy he first appears as an honorary exhibitor in 1784 with 'A Frigate and Cutter in Chase;' to the same exhibition he subsequently contributed 'The Fleet in Port Royal Harbour, Jamaica, after the Action of 12 June 1781' (1785), 'View of the City of Quebec' (1786), 'Breaking the French Line during Lord Rodney's Action on 12 April 1782' (1787), 'The Fire at Kingston, Jamaica, on 8 Feb. 1782' (1788), 'The Action between H.M.S. Quebec and Le Surveillant' and 'The Action between H.M.S. Serapis and Le Bonhomme' (1789).

Elliott was a fellow of the Incorporated Society of Artists, and contributed seven pictures to their exhibition in 1790, and six to that in 1791, in which year he was president of the society. There are two pictures of the English fleet by him in the royal collection at Hampton Court. Some of his pictures were engraved, including 'The Dreadful Situation of the Halsewell, East Indiaman, 6 Jan. 1786,' which he engraved in aquatint himself.

== Death ==
Elliott's exact lifetime is unclear. While the Dictionary of National Biography writes that "Elliott (then captain) died at Leeds on 21 July 1792", he lived longer according to other sources. E.g. the Netherlands Institute for Art History claims that he died in or after 1810 and is "often wrongly identified with a W.E. who died in 1792-07-21 or another who died 1838-09-20", and a set of paintings of the Battle of Cape St. Vincent in 1797 has been attributed to Elliott as well.
