= Sir George Blundell, 2nd Baronet =

Anglo-Irish politician

Sir George Blundell, 2nd Baronet (died 1675) was an Anglo-Irish politician.

Blundell was the son of Sir Francis Blundell, 1st Baronet and Joyce Serjeant, and on 26 April 1625 he succeeded to his father's baronetcy. Blundell was the Member of Parliament for Dingle in the Irish House of Commons from 1639 to 1649. He held the office of High Sheriff of King's County in 1657. Between 1661 and 1666 he represented Philipstown in the Irish Commons. Blundell was identified to be one of the Knights of the Royal Oak, however, the order was never established.

He married Sarah Colley, daughter of Sir William Colley and Elizabeth Giffard, and was succeeded in his title by his son, Francis Blundell.

Parliament of Ireland
Preceded by Dominick Rice; James Rice	Member of Parliament for Dingle; 1639–1649; With: Christopher Roper	Succeeded by Launcelot Sandes; Samuel Bathurst
Preceded by John Moore; Simon Digby	Member of Parliament for Philipstown; 1661–1666; With: Dudley Colley	Succeeded by Peter Purefoy; Duke Giffard
Baronetage of Ireland
Preceded by Francis Blundell	Baronet (of Edendeny); 1625–1675	Succeeded by Francis Blundell
