= Nicholas Throckmorton (alias Carew) =

Sir Nicholas Throckmorton or Carew (died June 21, 1664) was an English landowner and politician who sat in the House of Commons in two parliaments between 1601 and 1622.

Throckmorton was the son of Sir Nicholas Throckmorton of Paulerspury, Northamptonshire and his wife Anne Carew, daughter of Sir Nicholas Carew of Beddington, Surrey. His father died when he was still a child and he was left £500 and a half share in the salt monopoly. His mother died in 1587 and left him jewellery and household goods - despite using her name frequently, he was passed over under male-line primogeniture by a grant of the manors of Beddington and Coulsdon, Surrey by Elizabeth in 1589 to kinsman Sir Edward Darcy. Throckmorton was in Italy by 1588 and received education in Padua in 1590.

In 1601, he was elected Member of Parliament for Lyme Regis. He was knighted in June 1603 at Beddington and was a J.P for Surrey. He inherited under the will of his uncle Francis Carew of Beddington and changed his name to Carew in May 1611. He was appointed Chamberlain of the Exchequer in 1613, serving until his death. In 1621 he was elected MP for Surrey.

Throckmorton or Carew died in February 1644, and was buried in Beddington church.

Throckmorton married firstly by 1599, Mary More, daughter of Sir George More of Loseley Park, Surrey, and had five sons and three daughters. He wrote to More for financial assistance in 1604, "which if I cannot have I must leave my country, and my wife and children to the parish."

He married secondly by 1618, Susan Butler, née Bright, of Bury St. Edmunds, Suffolk, widow of Henry Butler merchant of London and had a son and daughter. He was the brother of Arthur Throckmorton and of Elizabeth, who married Sir Walter Raleigh.

One of his great-grandsons was Sir Nicholas Carew, 1st Baronet, another Member of Parliament.

Parliament of England
Preceded by Richard Tichborne; Christopher Ellesdon	Member of Parliament for Lyme Regis; 1601; With: John FitzJames	Succeeded by Sir George Somers; John Hassard
Preceded by Sir George More; Sir Edmund Bowyer	Member of Parliament for Surrey; 1621–1622; With: Sir George More	Succeeded by Sir Thomas Grimes; Sir Robert More
