= Billy Elliot (RHC) =

Irish loyalist paramilitary leader

- Born: William Elliot c. 1964; Belfast, Northern Ireland
- Died: 28 September 1995 (aged 31); Bangor, County Down, Northern Ireland
- Cause of death: Gunshot wounds to the head and neck
- Known for: Red Hand Commando second-in-command
- Spouse: Alison Elliot
- Children: 2
- Military career
- Paramilitary: Red Hand Commando
- Rank: Officer Commanding
- Unit: South Belfast Brigade
- Conflict: The Troubles

William Elliot (c. 1964 – 28 September 1995) was a Northern Irish loyalist and a leading member of the Red Hand Commando (RHC) paramilitary organisation. He fled Northern Ireland after being implicated in the brutal 1994 murder of an epileptic Protestant woman, Margaret Wright, who was beaten and shot inside a south Belfast loyalist bandhall in the mistaken belief that she was a Catholic or informant for the Royal Ulster Constabulary (RUC). For his part in the murder, Elliot was gunned down by members of his own organisation.

== Red Hand Commando ==
Born in Belfast, Northern Ireland in about 1964 to an Ulster Protestant family, Elliot joined the Red Hand Commando (RHC), a loyalist paramilitary organisation formed in 1972 in the Shankill Road area of Belfast and closely affiliated with the Ulster Volunteer Force (UVF). He eventually rose in the ranks to become the group's second-in-command. He was also Officer Commanding (OC) of the RHC's South Belfast unit. He lived in the staunchly loyalist, working-class Village area of south Belfast.

=== Margaret Wright killing ===
Elliot was implicated as the leader of the gang which killed Protestant woman Margaret Wright in the early hours of 6 April 1994. The 31-year-old woman from Forthriver Park, Glencairn estate had been inside the Ulster loyalist "Bad Bet" bandhall in Meridi Street (off the Donegall Road in the Village) where there was an all-night drink, drugs and rave music party in progress. The fortified bandhall, whose windows were blocked with concrete, was used as a meeting place for a local loyalist flute band. A sign outside read: "This hall is for band members only – no exceptions". Members of the Red Hand Commando, including Elliot, were also present that night. Wright had asked certain questions which led Elliot to believe she was a Catholic or an informant for the Royal Ulster Constabulary (RUC) Drugs Squad. Allegedly acting under instructions from Elliot, the bandhall chairman Christopher Sheals met her on the dance floor and handed her over to Elliot and UVF man Ian Hamilton (21) for a "grilling" and "rompering" (loyalist paramilitary slang term for a beating and torture session typically followed by execution).

She was taken to the bandhall storeroom, where she was interrogated by Elliot and Hamilton whilst the bandhall's disc jockey Stephen Rules stood guard outside. Wright, an epileptic, was ordered to strip to her underpants; she was then gagged, hooded, kicked and savagely beaten by the two men which included her body being crushed in the lengthy attack. Hamilton subsequently shot her four times in the head. Rules later told the RUC that he was summoned inside the storeroom where he found Elliot squatting beside Wright, who was lying on the floor with her bloodied head raised over a bucket. Elliot was wearing transparent gloves and scrubbing something off her body; he allegedly commented to Rules, "shot four times in the head and still alive". After she was tossed in a wheelie bin, Elliot ordered three other men to remove her from the premises. The men dumped the fatally injured Wright in the back yard of a derelict house several hundred yards away, and when they returned to the bandhall Elliot shook their hands and clapped them on the back. Following an anonymous tip-off, the RUC broke into the bandhall at 7.00 a.m. as Elliot was supervising the clean-up to remove all traces of blood from the storeroom. One of the men who had transported Wright from the bandhall later told the RUC where to find her but she was already dead when they arrived at the yard behind the vacant house on 7 April. Elliot was arrested twice but released due to lack of evidence, despite police being convinced of his guilt. His accomplices were too frightened of him to reveal his role as the one who ordered Margaret's Wright's beating and shooting. Rules also told police that he obeyed Elliot's orders out of fear as he had been shot in the leg by Elliot's henchmen on a previous occasion.

Six days later, Ian Hamilton was shot dead on a football pitch adjacent to a primary school in the Shankill Road area by members of the UVF's "Internal Security Unit" as punishment for his role in the killing. Elliot was branded an outlaw by the UVF. When he was arrested by the RUC for the second time in May 1994, he told them he was under a death threat and wore body armour as a means of protection. He then fled to Scotland for his safety. He returned to Northern Ireland some time after the Combined Loyalist Military Command ceasefire of 1994, but avoided his old haunts and settled in rural Cloughy instead.

His Belfast home was burned by an angry mob in retaliation for Wright's killing, and the "Bad Bet" bandhall demolished. The bandhall was just under a mile away from the disused bakery in Sandy Row where another Protestant woman, Ann Ogilby, was beaten to death twenty years earlier by members of the Sandy Row women's Ulster Defence Association unit.

== Death ==
Elliot was fatally shot at close range by RHC gunmen as he was getting into his car after leaving a friend's house in Primacy Park, Bangor, County Down on 28 September 1995. One bullet hit him in the back of the neck and another went through his ear, killing him instantly. When a woman came upon his body, he was still clutching his car keys. Elliot had been lured to the house by other RHC members on the orders of the unnamed commander of the group. His killing was sanctioned by both the UVF and RHC as a punishment for the brutal death of Margaret Wright which had provoked a public outcry and "tarnished" the RHC's image. According to Jim Cusack and Henry McDonald, Elliot had been a drug dealer and this too had helped to seal his fate as the RHC commander was strongly opposed to drug dealing by members of the organisation. The authors subsequently claimed that the killing had been carried out by Frankie Curry, a claim Curry himself corroborated in an interview shortly before his own death in 1999. Billy Hutchinson of the UVF-linked Progressive Unionist Party (PUP) offered the following statement justifying Elliot's punishment killing: "No one but close relatives will miss Elliot. The fact is, with him gone Northern Ireland's a wee bit safer place for all of us to live".

He had arrived home in Belfast a month before his death incorrectly believing that the loyalist ceasefire made it safe for him to return.

Elliot left behind a wife, Alison and two children. His wife was amongst those brought to trial for involvement in the murder of Wright.

=== Trial ===
Several people were arrested and brought to trial for their involvement in Wright's murder and the RHC leader ordered them to plead guilty or face being killed, either in jail or on the outside. At the start of the trial this led to all but one of those charged entering a guilty plea, only to have their pleas rejected by the judge as he was aware of the RHC threat and felt the pleas were thus made under duress. Some of those reporting on the trial asked whether the judge was the man in the wig or the man in the gallery, as the RHC leader attended the trial by sitting in the public gallery throughout.

In 1996, two men (Christopher Sheals and Stephen Rules) were sentenced to life imprisonment for their part in Margaret Wright's murder. The three men who disposed of her body were each jailed for seven years. Elliot's widow Alison was given a three-year suspended jail sentence after she admitted to having helped him change his blood-stained clothing following the killing. Lord Justice Nicholson said he showed her leniency on account of her two children and the fact that her husband was killed, however "worthless a human being he may have been".

Under questioning in 1998 by the RUC, Thomas Maginnis of Newtownards confessed to Elliot's killing; however he was freed by the Belfast Crown Court two years later after a judge ruled his confessions "inadmissible".
