= Sir Francis Blundell, 3rd Baronet =

Irish baronet and politician

Sir Francis Blundell, 3rd Baronet (30 January 1643 – 1707) was an Irish baronet and politician.

He was the son of Sir George Blundell, 2nd Baronet and his wife Sarah Colley, daughter of Sir William Colley. In 1675, he succeeded his father as baronet. The year before he and his two brothers William and Winwood killed Thomas Preston, 3rd Viscount Tara, but were acquitted of his murder and subsequently pardoned by the king. Following the Glorious Revolution in 1689, he was attainted by the Parliament of King James II of England. In 1692, Blundell was returned to the Irish House of Commons for King's County, and represented the constituency until his death in 1707.

On 1 December 1671, Blundell married firstly Ursula Davys, daughter of Sir Paul Davys and his second wife Anne Parsons. She died two years later, and he married secondly Anne Ingoldsby, only daughter of Sir Henry Ingoldsby, 1st Baronet and Anne Waller, in 1675.By his second wife, Blundell had nine children, including Montague, who succeeded to the baronetcy and was later elevated to the Peerage of Ireland as Viscount Blundell, and Anne, who married the prominent Jacobite General Robert Echlin.

Parliament of Ireland
| Unknown | Member of Parliament for King's County; 1692 – 1707; With: Sir William Parsons | Succeeded by Sir William Parsons, 2nd Bt; William Purefoy |
Baronetage of Ireland
| Preceded by George Blundell | Baronet (of Edendeny); 1675 – 1707 | Succeeded by Montague Blundell |
