= Sir Francis Blundell, 1st Baronet =

English-born lawyer, politician and administrator

Sir Francis Blundell, 1st Baronet (4 September 1579 – 26 April 1625) was an English-born lawyer, politician and administrator in Ireland.

== Biography ==
Blundell was the second son of a yeoman, John Blundell, and Catherine Budoxshyde. He was educated in law at Broadgates Hall until 1596 and then Christ Church, Oxford, graduating in 1603.

Thanks to a familial connection to Richard Cooke, he was appointed Surveyor General of Ireland on 18 February 1609. Between 1613 and 1615 he was the Member of Parliament for Lifford in the Irish House of Commons. Blundell was a remembrancer for Irish affairs from 1617 to 1622, acting as intermediary between James VI and I and his government in Ireland. During this period, Blundell was knighted on 30 January 1618 and on 13 October 1620 he was created a baronet, of Edenderry in the Baronetage of Ireland. Blundell was called to the bar as a member of Gray's Inn in 1618.

In 1621, an attempt by Viscount Wallingford to have Blundell elected to the English parliament as the member for Oxford failed. Despite having been returned by the mayor, he was unseated in favour of Thomas Wentworth without taking any part in the proceedings. In 1622 he assumed the office of Vice-Treasurer of Ireland and was reappointed to the role by Charles I in April 1625, dying two weeks later.

Blundell had married Joyce Serjeant: they had four sons of which only the eldest George Blundell, survived into adulthood, inheriting his father's title. At the direction of King via the Duke of Buckingham, Lady Blundell received a payment of £500 from Sir Francis Annesley (in his role as the new Vice-Treasurer of Ireland), following her husband's death.

Parliament of Ireland
Unknown	Member of Parliament for Lifford; 1613-1615; With: William Disney	Succeeded by Roger Mainwaring; Jerome Alexander
Baronetage of Ireland
New creation	Baronet (of Edenderry); 1620-1625	Succeeded by George Blundell
