= George More =

English politician (1553–1632)

Sir George More
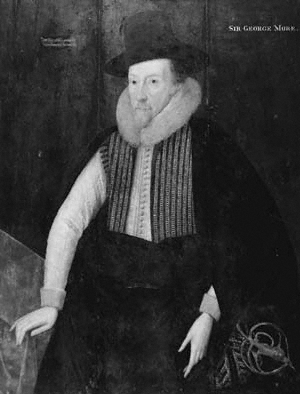
- Portrait of Sir George More.
- Born: 28 November 1553; London, England
- Died: 16 October 1632 (aged 78); London, England
- Occupations: Courtier, politician

Sir George More (28 November 1553 – 16 October 1632) was an English courtier and politician who sat in the House of Commons at various times between 1584 and 1625.

== Early life ==
More was the son of Sir William More of Loseley Park, Surrey and his second wife, Margaret Daniell, daughter of Ralph Daniell of Swaffham, Norfolk.

He was educated at the Royal Grammar School, Guildford and Corpus Christi College, Oxford. He left Oxford after failing his academic exercises, and was admitted to Inner Temple in 1574. He was a Justice of the Peace for Surrey and Sussex and Deputy Lieutenant for Surrey.

== Career ==
In 1584, More was elected Member of Parliament for Guildford and was re-elected MP for Guildford in 1586 and 1589. He was provost marshal for Surrey in 1589. In 1593, he was MP for Guildford again. He was High Sheriff of Surrey and Sussex in 1596. In 1597, he was elected MP for Surrey. He was knighted in February 1598. From 23 June 1601 to 1613, he was Chamberlain of the Receipt in the Exchequer. He was re-elected MP for Surrey in 1601. He was re-elected MP for Guildford in 1604 and for Surrey in 1614. From 1615 to 1617, he was Lieutenant of the Tower of London. He was elected MP for Surrey again in 1621. In 1624 he was elected MP for Guildford and was elected MP for Surrey again in 1625.

Among his other roles, More was treasurer and receiver general to James I's son, Henry, Prince of Wales, and Chancellor of the Order of the Garter. He was subsidy and loan commissioner, muster commissioner, and commissioner for recusants and seminaries for Surrey. He was a verderer of Windsor Forest and constable of Farnham Castle.

In April 1607 the Earl of Dorset wrote to More hoping he could influence the Countess of Cumberland to arrange the marriage of her daughter Lady Anne Clifford to his grandson Richard Sackville.

== Marriages and issue ==
More married first Anne Poynings (died 19 November 1590), (daughter of Sir Adrian Poynings of Burnegate, Dorset and Mary West), by whom he had four sons and five daughters:

- Sir Robert More.
- George More.
- William More. He was a young companion of Prince Henry, and wrote to his father for a horse to ride with the Prince to visit some paper mills.
- John More.
- Mary More, who married Sir Nicholas Throckmorton.
- Margaret More, who married Sir Thomas Grimes.
- Anne More, who married the poet John Donne, much against the wishes of her father, who had Donne imprisoned as a result, though they were later reconciled.
- Elizabeth More, who married Sir John Mills.
- Frances More, who married Sir John Oglander.

He married secondly Constance Michell, widow of Richard Knight, esquire, and daughter and co-heir of John Michell the younger of Stammerham (died 1555), near Horsham, West Sussex, by whom he had no issue.

Parliament of England
Preceded by William More; Thomas Stoughton	Member of Parliament for Guildford; 1584–1593; With: Laurence Stoughton	Succeeded by Sir William More; Sir Robert Southwell
Preceded by Sir John Wolley; Sir William More	Member of Parliament for Surrey; 1597–1601; With: William Howard 1597; Charles Howard	Succeeded by Sir Robert More; Sir Edmund Bowyer
Preceded by Robert More; William Jackson	Member of Parliament for Guildford; 1604–1611; With: George Austen	Succeeded by Sir Robert More; George Stoughton
Preceded by Sir Robert More; Sir Edmund Bowyer	Member of Parliament for Surrey; 1614–1622; With: Sir Nicholas Carew	Succeeded by Sir Robert More; Sir Thomas Grimes
Preceded by Sir Robert More; John Murray	Member of Parliament for Guildford; 1624; With: Nicholas Stoughton	Succeeded by Sir Robert More; Robert Parkhurst
Preceded by Sir Robert More; Sir Thomas Grimes	Member of Parliament for Surrey; 1625; With: Sir Francis Leigh	Succeeded by Sir Richard Onslow; Sir Ambrose Browne
