= John Goodwin (Parliamentarian) =

English lawyer and politician

John Goodwin (c. 1603 – 18 February 1674) was an English lawyer and politician who sat in the House of Commons at various time between 1641 and 1660. He supported the Parliamentary cause in the English Civil War.

Goodwin was the son of Edward Goodwin of Horne, Surrey and his wife Susan Wallop, daughter of Richard Wallop of Bugbrooke, Northamptonshire. He entered Inner Temple in 1622 and was called to the bar in 1630.

In 1641, Goodwin was elected Member of Parliament for Haslemere in the Long Parliament. In 1643 he was commissioner for sequestration for Surrey, commissioner for levying of money for Leicestershire and Surrey, commissioner for assessment for Surrey, commissioner for accounts for Surrey and commissioner for defence. In 1645, he was commissioner for execution of ordinances, commissioner for new model ordinance and commissioner for defence. By 1646 he was a J.P. for Surrey. He remained in the Rump Parliament after Pride's Purge. He was a steward of Wimbledon manor, Surrey from 1649 to May 1660 and a bencher of his Inn from 1649 to 1661. Also in 1649, he was commissioner for militia for Surrey, commissioner for great level of the fens and commissioner for obstructions 1649. He became a JP for Gloucestershire in 1650 and a commissioner for assessment for London in 1652.

In 1654 Goodwin was elected MP for East Grinstead in the First Protectorate Parliament and was re-elected MP for East Grinstead in the Second Protectorate Parliament. He became a JP for Surrey in 1656 and a commissioner for assessment for Surreyand commissioner for assessment for Gloucestershire in 1657. He was commissioner for militia for Buckinghamshire, Gloucestershire and Surrey in 1659. Also in 1659 he was elected MP for Bletchingley. He was a commissioner for assessment for Surrey in January 1660, and a commissioner for militia for Surrey in March 1660. In April 1660 he was re-elected MP for Bletchingley in the Convention Parliament.

Goodwin died at the age of 70 and was buried at Worth.

Goodwin married Katherine Deane daughter of Sir Richard Deane, Lord. Mayor of London, before 1635. They had a son and two daughters. He was the brother of Robert Goodwin.

Parliament of England
Preceded by Poynings More; Sir John Jacques	Member of Parliament for Haslemere; 1641–1653; With: Poynings More 1640; Carew Raleigh 1649–1653	Not represented in Barebones Parliament
Vacant Not represented in Barebones Parliament	Member of Parliament for East Grinstead; 1654–1656	Succeeded by Robert Goodwin; George Courthope
Vacant Not represented in Second Protectorate Parliament	Member of Parliament for Bletchingley; 1659; With: Edmund Hoskins	Not represented in Restored Rump
