= William Jackson (fl. 1601–1604) =

English politician

William Jackson (fl. 1601–1604) was an English politician.

He was a member (MP) of the Parliament of England for Guildford in 1601 and for Haslemere in 1604. He has not been clearly identified, beyond his name in the records, but The History of Parliament theorizes that he may have the same person as the younger brother of fellow MP John Jackson.
