= Carew Raleigh (1605–1666) =

English politician

This article concerns Sir Walter Raleigh's son. For his namesake and uncle, Sir Walter's brother, see Carew Raleigh

Carew Raleigh or Ralegh (1605–1666) was an English politician.

== Biography ==
Raleigh was the son of Sir Walter Raleigh. Born in the Tower of London during his father's incarceration, he was educated at Wadham College, Oxford. After his father's death he was presented at court, but the King supposedly complained that he looked like his father's ghost, and later refused the royal assent to a parliamentary bill restoring his rights of blood; Charles I initially did the same, before eventually allowing it to be enacted in 1628.

Raleigh was elected to Parliament to fill a vacancy as Member for Haslemere in 1649, sitting until the Long Parliament was ejected in 1653, and briefly once more when the Rump was restored from May to October 1659. The Rump was again restored in December 1659. Though Raleigh failed in his attempt to be elected to the new Council of State, he was appointed Governor of Jersey. After the Rump was finally dissolved in March 1660, he did not seek election to the Convention Parliament, which met on 25 April. With the Restoration of Charles II, he was relieved of his post as Governor of Jersey, but was offered a knighthood, which he asked should be bestowed on his son, Walter.

He died at his London house in St Martin's Lane in 1666, and was buried at St Margaret's Church, Westminster in his father's grave. The register states that he was "kild", and it has been speculated that this means that he was murdered, but no details of his death are known.

== See also ==
- List of MPs not excluded from the English parliament in 1648

== Sources ==
- Brunton, D.; Pennington, D.H. (1954). Members of the Long Parliament. London: George Allen & Unwin.
- Laughton and, John Knox; Lee, Sidney (1896). "Ralegh, Carew (1605-1666)" . In Lee, Sidney (ed.). Dictionary of National Biography. Vol. 47. London: Smith, Elder & Co. p. 205.
- Willis, Browne (1750). Notitia Parliamentaria, Part II: A Series or Lists of the Representatives in the several Parliaments held from the Reformation 1541, to the Restoration 1660 ... London. p. 1.
