= George Woodroffe =

English politician

George Woodroffe (1625 - 1688) was an English politician for a Surrey constituency in the late seventeenth century.

Woodroffe was born at Poyle in Stanwell and educated at Christ Church, Oxford. He was High Sheriff of Surrey in 1668 and was knighted on 19 May 1681. Woodroffe sat as M.P. for Haslemere from 1681 to 1687. He died on 6 December that year.

His son also sat as MP for Haslemere.

== Notes ==
Parliament of England
Preceded by Francis Dorrington	Member of Parliament for Haslemere; 1681–1687; With: William More; George Vernon	Succeeded by Denzil Onslow
