= Chaloner Chute (died 1666) =

English lawyer and politician

Chaloner Chute (1632–1666) was an English lawyer and politician who sat in the House of Commons in 1659 and 1661.

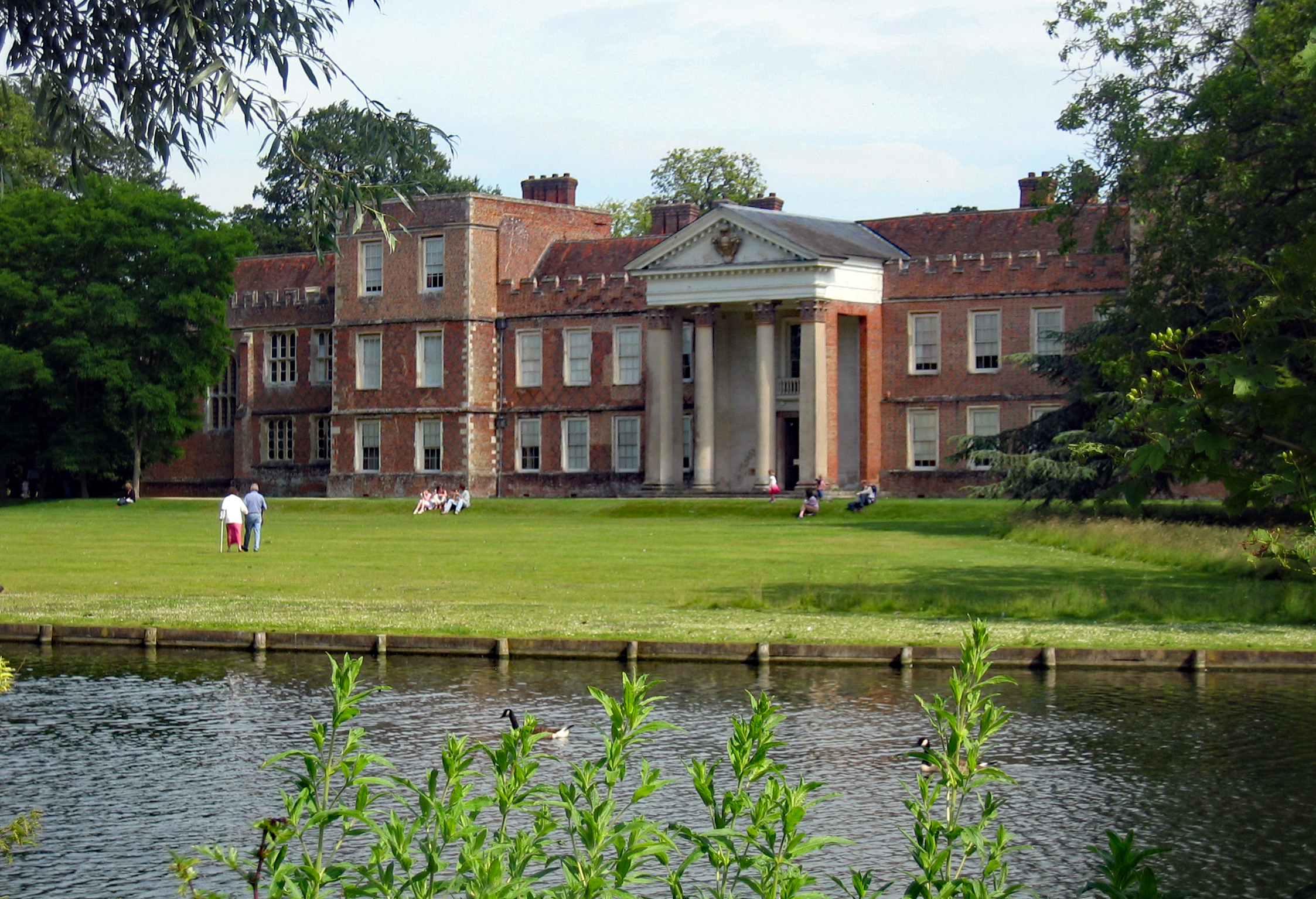
The Vyne

Chute was the only surviving son of Chaloner Chute of Sutton Court, Chiswick, Middlesex and his first wife Anne Scory, daughter of Sir John Scory of Wormesley, Herefordshire. He was baptised on 15 December 1632. He entered Middle Temple in 1645 and was called to the bar in 1656.

In 1659, Chute was elected member of parliament for Devizes when his father was speaker. His father died in April 1659, and Chute succeeded to the estates including The Vyne. He was a justice of the peace for Hampshire from 1659 to July 1660 and a commissioner for militia for Hampshire and Middlesex in 1659. He was a commissioner for assessment for Wiltshire in January 1660 and a commissioner for militia for Middlesex in March 1660. In 1661 he was elected as a member of parliament for Haslemere in the Cavalier Parliament but his election was declared void on 20 May. He was a commissioner for assessment for Hampshire from 1665 until his death.

Chute died at the age of 34.

Chute married Catharine Lennard, a daughter of Richard Lennard, 13th Baron Dacre in 1654 and had three sons and a daughter.

Parliament of England
Preceded by Edward Scotton	Member of Parliament for Devizes; 1659; With: Edward Scotton	Succeeded by Edward Bayntun; Robert Nicholas
