= Haslemere (constituency) =

UK parliamentary constituency in England, 1584–1832

- Former borough constituency for the House of Commons
- Borough: Haslemere

1584–1832
- Seats: 2
- Replaced by: West Surrey

Haslemere was a parliamentary borough in Surrey, which elected two Members of Parliament (MPs) to the House of Commons from 1584 until 1832, when the borough was abolished by the Great Reform Act.

== Members of Parliament ==
=== 1584-1640 ===
Parliament	First member	Second member
1584	Christopher Rithe	Marlyon Rithe
1586	William Morgan	William Campion
1588–9	Hugh Hare	John Haselrigge
1593	Adrian Stoughton	Nicholas Saunders
1597	Francis Aungier	George Austen
1601	Francis Wolley	John Clarke
1604	Edward Fraunceys	William Jackson
1614	Sir Thomas Grimes	Sir William Browne
1621	Sir Thomas Grimes	Sir William Browne
1624-1625	Francis Carew	Poynings More
1625	Francis Carew	Poynings More
1626	Francis Carew	Poynings More
1628	George Grimes	Sir Thomas Canon
1629–1640	No Parliaments summoned	

=== 1640-1832 ===
Year	First member	First party	Second member	Second party
April 1640	Poynings More	Parliamentarian	Sir John Jacques, Bt	
November 1640	Poynings More	Parliamentarian	John Goodwin	Parliamentarian
1649	Carew Raleigh		John Goodwin	Parliamentarian
1653	Haslemere was unrepresented in the Barebones Parliament and the First and Second Parliaments of the Protectorate			
January 1659	John Westbrooke		Henry Fitzjames	
May 1659	Carew Raleigh		John Goodwin	
April 1660	John Westbrooke		Richard West	
March 1661	James Gresham		Chaloner Chute	
May 1661	George Evelyn		Thomas Morrice	
1675	George Evelyn		Sir William More, Bt	
1679	James Gresham		Sir William More, Bt	
1680	Denzil Onslow	Whig	Francis Dorrington	
1681	Sir William More, Bt		George Woodroffe Sr.	
1685	Sir George Vernon		George Woodroffe Sr.	
1689	White Tichborne		Denzil Onslow	Whig
1690	George Rodney Brydges		Denzil Onslow	Whig
1695	George Rodney Brydges		George Woodroffe Jr.	
1698	Sir Theophilus Oglethorpe		George Vernon	
January 1701	Sir Theophilus Oglethorpe		George Woodroffe Jr.	
November 1701	George Vernon		George Woodroffe Jr.	
1702	George Vernon		Lewis Oglethorpe	
1704	George Vernon		Thomas Heath	
1705	George Woodroffe Jr.		John Fulham	
1708	Thomas Onslow		Theophilus Oglethorpe	
1708	Nicholas Carew		Theophilus Oglethorpe	
1710	Sir John Clerke, Bt		Theophilus Oglethorpe	
1713	Thomas Onslow		George Vernon	
1714	Nicholas Carew		George Vernon	
1715	Nicholas Carew		Sir Montague Blundell, Bt	
1722	James Oglethorpe	Tory	Peter Burrell	
1727	James Oglethorpe	Tory	Peter Burrell	
1734	James Oglethorpe	Tory	Peter Burrell	
1741	James Oglethorpe	Tory	Peter Burrell	
1747	James Oglethorpe	Tory	Peter Burrell	
1754	James More Molyneux		Philip Carteret Webb	
1759	Thomas More Molyneux		Philip Carteret Webb	
1761	Thomas More Molyneux		Philip Carteret Webb	
1768	Thomas More Molyneux		William Burrell	
1774	Thomas More Molyneux		Sir Merrick Burrell, Bt	
1776	Peter Burrell		Sir Merrick Burrell, Bt	
September 1780	Sir James Lowther		Edward Norton	
December 1780	Walter Spencer Stanhope		Edward Norton	
1784	Thomas Postlethwaite		John Baynes Garforth	
1786	John Lowther		John Baynes Garforth	
June 1790	William Gerard Hamilton		James Lowther	
December 1790	William Gerard Hamilton		Richard Penn	
1791	William Gerard Hamilton		James Clarke Satterthwaite	
1796	James Lowther		James Clarke Satterthwaite	
November 1796	George Wood		James Clarke Satterthwaite	
1802	George Wood		Richard Penn	
1806	Viscount Garlies	Tory	Charles Long	Tory
1807	Robert Plumer Ward	Tory	Charles Long	Tory
1823	George Lowther Thompson	Tory	Charles Long	Tory
1826	George Lowther Thompson	Tory	Sir John Beckett, Bt	Tory
1830	William Holmes	Tory	Sir John Beckett, Bt	Tory
1832	Constituency abolished			
