= Austen (surname) =

- Gender: Male
- Language: French

Other names
- Related names: Augustine; Augustin; Agustin; Aostin; Austin; Auston

Austen is a surname deriving from the Latin Augustine, and was first used around the 13th century.

== Notable people with the surname ==
- Abigail Austen (born 1964), British Army officer
- Alice Austen (1866–1952), American photographer
- Anna Austen Lefroy (1793–1872), writer
- Arthur Austen-Leigh
- Augusta Amherst Austen (1827–1877), British composer
- Bob Austen (1914–1999), Australian rules footballer
- Cassandra Austen (1773–1845), English painter
- Cecil Austen (1918–2017), Australian cricketer
- Charles Austen (1779–1852), English admiral
- Charles Austen Angell, chemist
- Charles Austen-Leigh, English cricketer and painter
- Chuck Austen, American writer
- Col Austen (1920–1995), Australian rules footballer and coach
- Dale Austen (1910–?), New Zealand actress
- David Austen, English cricketer
- Don Austen (born 1958), English puppeteer
- Edmund Godwin Austen (1854–1932), English cricketer
- Edward Austen (1820–1908), English cricketer
- Eric Austen (1922–1999), English designer
- Ernest Austen (cricketer) (1900–1983), Australian cricketer
- Ernest Edward Austen (1867–1938), English entomologist
- Ernie Austen (1891–1985), Australian racewalker
- Francis Austen (1774–1865), English admiral
- Geoff Austen (born 1953), Australian rules footballer
- George Austen (disambiguation), multiple people
- Henry Austen (disambiguation), multiple people
- Howard Austen (1929–2003), American social figure
- James Austen (1765–1819), English clergyman
- Jane Austen (1775–1817), English novelist
- Joe Austen, British artist
- John Austen (disambiguation), multiple people
- Katherine Austen (1629–1683), British poet
- Louie Austen (born 1946), Austrian musician
- Margaret Austen (born 1947), English diver
- Michael Austen (born 1964), South African cricketer
- Patrick Austen (1933–2013), British field hockey player
- Ralph Austen (1612–1676), English author
- Robert Austen (disambiguation), multiple people
- Siobhan Austen, Australian economist
- Stephen Austen, Australian archer
- Thomas Austen (1775–1859), British soldier and politician
- Tom Austen (born 1988), English actor
- W. H. Austen (1878–1956), British railway engineer
- Winifred Austen (1876–1964), English illustrator

== Fictional characters ==
- Kate Austen, in the television series Lost

== Technology ==
- Austen submachine gun, an Australian submachine gun
