= Austen-Leigh =

Austen-Leigh is an English surname. Notable people with the surname include:

- Arthur Austen-Leigh
- Lois Austen-Leigh
- Spencer Austen-Leigh (1834–1913), English cricketer
- Augustus Austen Leigh

== See also ==
- Austen (given name)
- Austen (surname)
- Leigh (name)
