= John Austin =

John Austin may refer to:

== Arts and entertainment ==
- John P. Austin (1906–1997), American set decorator
- Johnny Austin (1910–1983), American musician
- John Austin (author) (fl. 1940s), British novelist

== Military ==
- John Austin (soldier) (1801–1833), active in early settlement of Mexican Texas
- John Arnold Austin (1905–1941), United States Navy warrant officer
- John Beech Austin (1917–2012), British aviator in World War II

== Philosophy ==
- J. L. Austin (John Langshaw Austin, 1911–1960), British philosopher of language
- John Austin (legal philosopher) (1790–1859), British legal and political theorist

== Politics ==
- John Gardiner Austin (1812–1900), British colonial secretary of Hong Kong
- Sir John Austin, 1st Baronet (1824–1906), British politician, MP for Osgoldcross
- John Austin (politician) (born 1944), British politician, MP

== Religion ==
- John Austin (1613–1669), English Catholic theologian and writer
- John Austin (Jesuit) (1717–1784), Irish Jesuit
- John Mather Austin (1805–1880), American Universalist clergyman
- John Austin (bishop) (1939–2007), British bishop of Aston

== Sports ==
- John Austin (cricketer) (1871–1956), Barbadian cricketer
- John Austin (basketball) (born 1944), American basketball player
- John Austin (tennis) (born 1957), American tennis player
- John Austin (American football) (fl. 1976–2003), American college football player and coach

== Others ==
- J. Paul Austin (1915–1985), president and CEO of The Coca-Cola Company, 1962–1981
- John Austin (highwayman) (died 1783), English criminal, last person hanged on the gallows at Tyburn, London
- John Austin (inventor) (1752–1830), Scottish inventor of musical equipment
- John Alexander Austin (1912–1984), Canadian aviator
- John C. Austin (1870–1963), British-born American architect
- John Osborne Austin (1849–1918), American genealogist
- John Baptist Austin (1799–1882), English schoolmaster and minister in South Australia

== See also ==
- John Austen (disambiguation)
- Jack Austin (disambiguation)
