= Austen (given name) =

- Gender: Male
- Language: French

Other names
- Related names: Augustine; Augustin; Agustin; Aostin; Austin; Austyn; Auston; Austan

Austen is a masculine given name deriving from the Latin Augustine or August.

== Notable people with the name ==
- Austen Albu (1903–1994), British politician
- Austen Angell (1933–2021), Australian chemist
- Austen Campbell (1901–1981), English footballer
- Austen Cargill (1887–1957), American businessman
- Austen S. Cargill II (born 1951), American businessman
- Austen Chamberlain (1863–1937), British statesman
- Austen Colgate (1852–1924), American politician from New Jersey
- Austen Cowper (1885–1960), South African cricketer
- Austen Robin Crapp (1934–2024), Australian prelate
- Austen Crehore (1893–1962), American pilot
- Austen Croom-Johnson (1909–1964), English pianist
- Austen Deans (1915–2011), New Zealand painter
- Austen George Fox (1849–1937), American lawyer
- Austen Gittos (1923–1986), New Zealand fencer
- Austen Harrison (1891–1976), British architect
- Austen Hudson (1894–1970), British politician
- Austen Ivereigh (born 1966), British author
- Austen Kark (1926–2002), British media manager
- Austen Lane (born 1987), American football player
- Austen Lake (1895–1964), American author
- Austen Henry Layard (1817–1894), English art historian
- Austen Pleasants (born 1997), American football player
- Austen Fox Riggs (1876–1940), American psychiatrist
- Austen Rowland (born 1981), American basketball player
- Austen Schauer, American politician
- Austen Smith (born 2001), American sports shooter
- Austen Tayshus (born 1954), Australian comedian
- Austen Williams (born 1992), American baseball player

== See also ==
- Austen (surname), a page for people with the surname Austen
- Austin (given name), a page for people with the given name Austin
- Austin (surname), a page for people with the surname Austin
