= Diodorus of Tarsus =

4th-century theologian

Mar Diodorus of Tarsus

Bishop of Tarsus
- Born: unknown Antioch (modern-day Antakya, Hatay, Turkey)
- Died: 390; Tarsus (modern-day Tarsus, Mersin, Turkey)
- Venerated in: Church of the East
- Controversy: Christology
- Influenced: John Chrysostom; Theodore of Mopsuestia

Diodore of Tarsus
- Bishop of Tarsus
- Church: Christian (Nicene)
- See: Tarsus
- In office: 378–390

Orders
- Ordination: 360

Personal details
- Born: unknown Antioch (modern-day Antakya, Hatay, Turkey)
- Died: 390 Tarsus (modern-day Tarsus, Mersin, Turkey)

Diodore of Tarsus (Greek Διόδωρος ὁ Ταρσεύς; died c. 390) was a Christian bishop, monastic reformer, and theologian. A strong supporter of the orthodoxy of Nicaea, Diodore played a pivotal role in the Council of Constantinople and opposed the anti-Christian policies of Julian the Apostate. Diodore founded one of the most influential centers of Christian thought in the early church, and many of his students became notable theologians in their own right.

== Early life ==
Diodore was born into a noble family in the area of Antioch. He received a classic philosophical education at the school of Athens, and very quickly after his education he entered into the monastic life. During this period, Diodore's work focused on philosophical treatises and opposing Emperor Julian's attempts to restore paganism in the empire. When an Arian named Leontius was made bishop of Antioch, Diodore and his friend Flavian (who later was appointed as bishop of Antioch) organized those who followed the Nicene orthodoxy outside the walls of the city for worship. Those services are seen as the beginning of antiphonal singing in the church, a practice that became widespread among Christians.

During his time at the monastery in Antioch, Diodore came under the tutelage of Meletius of Antioch. Meletius was elected bishop in 360 and ordained Diodore as a priest. When the Antioch split into factions, Diodore was a strong supporter of Meletius and of his move towards Nicene orthodoxy. Diodore was noted for living with few possessions, being dependent on alms for food, frequently being imprisoned on account of his beliefs. His physical appearance was rough, but John Chrysostom describes his expression as angelic.

== Priesthood ==
During his priesthood, Diodore founded a monastery and catechetical school near the city of Antioch. It was through this school that Diodore became the mentor of the controversial theologian and liturgist Theodore of Mopsuestia as well as Chrysostom. This school would give rise to the unique Antiochene perspectives on both biblical interpretation and Christology known as the Antiochene School. Ultimately, taken to the extreme, the perspective set out for this school by Diodore led to the teachings of Nestorius, which were first condemned at the First Council of Ephesus in 431.

It was Diodore's role as the head of the Antiochene School which led to his exile in 372. Banished to Armenia by Emperor Valens, Diodore encountered a fellow supporter of the Nicene faction, Basil of Caesarea, during his exile. When Diodore returned from exile following the death of Valens in 378, he was appointed as the bishop of Tarsus by Meletius of Antioch.

== Episcopate ==
As bishop of the see of Tarsus, Diodore continued to speak out for the Nicene understanding of the relationship between the human and the divine in the person of Jesus Christ. He actively opposed both the Arianism and the Apollinarianism of his day (Arius taught that Jesus Christ was a creation of god, rather than a child and subordinate to him; Apollinaris of Laodicea spoke of the Incarnation in ways that left him open to the charge that Christ was not in all aspects human by saying that his mind was divine and non-rational).

Diodore played key roles in both the local Council of Antioch (379) and the ecumenical First Council of Constantinople in 381. When their mentor Meletius died in 381, Diodore recommended his friend Flavian as his successor, thus prolonging the division in the Antiochene church. Diodore died around 394.

== Theology ==
The Christology of Diodore was condemned as heretical by later generations, most explicitly at a local synod in Constantinople in 499 which described Diodore's views as Nestorian. Certainly, a similarly negative view of Diodore was held by Cyril of Alexandria. However, in his own generation Diodore was seen as someone who supported the orthodoxy of Nicaea, and in his official decree ratifying the actions of the First Council of Constantinople, Emperor Theodosius I describes Diodore as a "champion of the faith."

The specifics of Diodore's theology are difficult to reconstruct, as all that remains of his works are fragments of uncertain provenance. Much of Diodore's theology has been inferred from the later statements of his students and the intellectual heirs of the Antiochene School.

According to universalist clergyman John Mather Austin (1855) Diodorus was also a universalist since Saloman, Bishop of Bassorah in his Book of the Bee (1222) proclaimed the salvation of all men and cited the opinions of both Diodorus and Theodore of Mopsuestia in support of his view. According to Universalist writer J. W. Hanson (1899) Diodorus believed that God's mercy would punish the wicked less than their sins deserved, inasmuch as his mercy gave the good more than they deserved and he denied that God would bestow immortality for the purpose of prolonging or perpetuating suffering.

Diodorus according to Joseph Simon Assemani’s Bibliotheca Orientalis (1728)

— "For the wicked there are punishments, not perpetual, however, lest the immortality prepared for them should be a disadvantage, but they are to be purified for a brief period according to the amount of malice in their works. They shall therefore suffer punishment for a short space, but immortal blessedness having no end awaits them, the penalties to be inflicted for their many and grave sins are very far surpassed by the magnitude of the mercy to be showed them. The resurrection, therefore, is regarded as a blessing not only to the good, but also to the evil."

== See also ==
- Christian Universalism
- Early Christianity
- Eastern Christianity
- Theoria
