= Jack Austin =

Jack Austin may refer to:

- Jack Austin (politician) (born 1932), Canadian politician
- Jack Austin (footballer) (1910–1983), Australian rules football player
- Jack L. Austin (born 1945), Australian rules football player
- Jack Austin (rugby league), rugby league footballer of the 1960s and 1970s
- Jack Austin (weightlifter) (1900–1988), British weightlifter

== See also ==
- John Austin (disambiguation)
