= Borough of Guildford =

Guildford
- Borough and non-metropolitan district
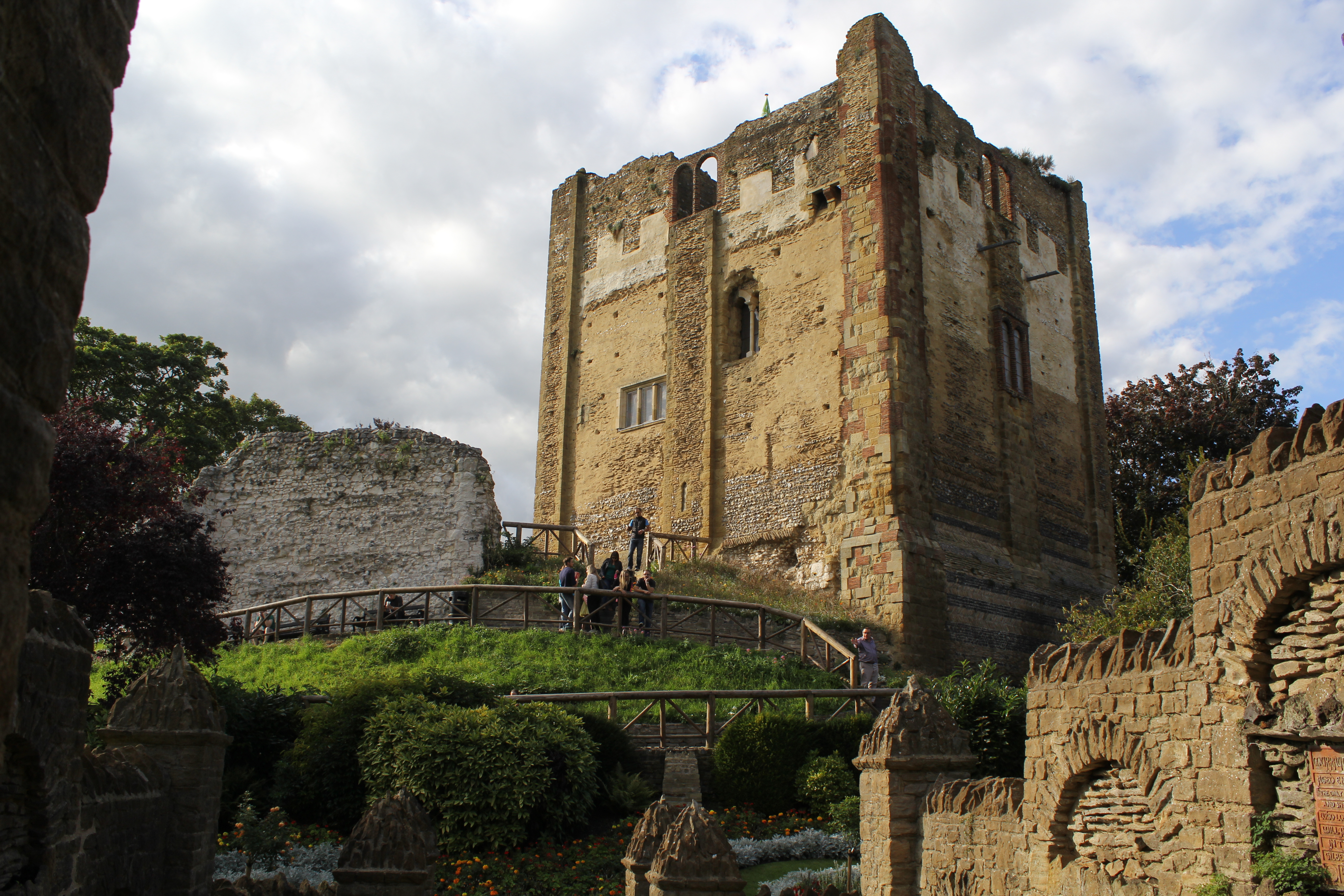
- Guildford Castle in Guildford, the borough's main settlement.
- Motto: Fortiter et Fideliter (Latin: Bravely and faithfully)
- Guildford shown within Surrey
- Coordinates: 51°14′46″N 0°33′07″W
- Sovereign state: United Kingdom
- Constituent country: England
- Region: South East England
- Ceremonial county: Surrey
- Established: 1 April 1974
- Administrative HQ: Guildford

Government
  - Type: Non-metropolitan district
  - Body: Guildford Borough Council
  - MPs: Zöe Franklin (Guildford); Jeremy Hunt (Godalming and Ash); Chris Coghlan (Dorking and Horley); Al Pinkerton (Surrey Heath); Will Forster (Woking)

Area
  - Total: 105 sq mi (271 km^{2})
  - Rank: 130th

Population (2024)
  - Total: 151,359
  - Rank: 150th
  - Density: 1,450/sq mi (559/km^{2})

Ethnicity (2021)
  - Ethnic groups: List: 86.9% White; 6.7% Asian; 3.1% Mixed; 1.9% other; 1.5% Black

Religion (2021)
  - Religion: List: 48.2% Christianity; 39.7% no religion; 7% not stated; 2.2% Islam; 1.4% Hinduism; 0.7% Buddhism; 0.5% other; 0.3% Judaism; 0.2% Sikhism
- Time zone: UTC+0 (Greenwich Mean Time)
  - Summer (DST): UTC+1 (British Summer Time)
- ONS code: 43UD (ONS); E07000209 (GSS)
- OS grid reference: TQ0105550700

The Borough of Guildford is a local government district with borough status in Surrey, England. With around half of the borough's population, Guildford is its largest settlement and only town, and is where the council is based.

The borough includes part of the Surrey Hills, a designated Area of Outstanding Natural Beauty. The neighbouring districts are Surrey Heath, Woking, Elmbridge, Reigate and Banstead, Waverley and Rushmoor.

== History ==
The town of Guildford was an ancient borough, with its first known charter dating from 1257. It was reformed to become a municipal borough in 1836 under the Municipal Corporations Act 1835, which standardised the way many boroughs operated across the country. The borough boundaries were enlarged several times, notably in 1836, 1933 and 1954.

The modern district was formed on 1 April 1974 under the Local Government Act 1972, covering the area of two former districts, which were both abolished at the same time:

- Guildford Municipal Borough
- Guildford Rural District

Guildford's borough status transferred to the new district from its creation, allowing the chair of the council to take the title of mayor, continuing Guildford's series of mayors dating back to at least the fifteenth century.

As part of upcoming structural changes to local government in England, the district will be abolished in April 2027 and the area will become part of the new unitary authority of West Surrey.

== Governance ==
Guildford Borough Council

Type
- Type: Non-metropolitan district

Leadership
- Mayor: Jane Tyson, Liberal Democrat since 29 April 2026
- Leader: Julia McShane, Liberal Democrat since 11 October 2022
- Chief Executive: Pedro Wrobel since 8 April 2024

Structure
- Seats: 48 councillors
- Political groups: Administration (25) Liberal Democrats (25) Other parties (23) Conservative (10) Residents (7) Greenbelt Group (3) Labour (3)
- Length of term: 4 years

Elections
- First election: 7 June 1973
- Last election: 4 May 2023

Meeting place
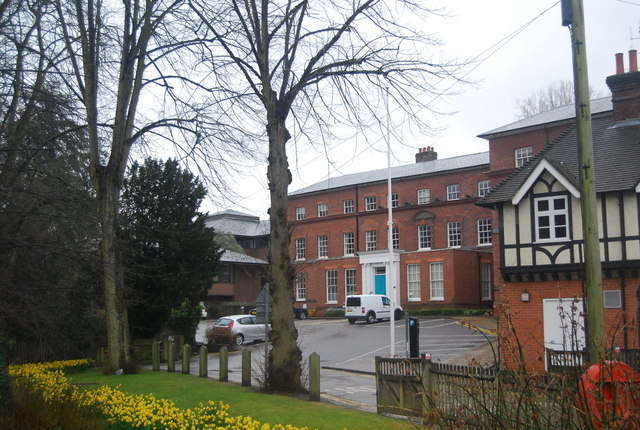
- Millmead House, Millmead, Guildford, GU2 4BB

Website
- www.guildford.gov.uk

Guildford Borough Council provides district-level services. County-level services are provided by Surrey County Council. Parts of the borough are covered by civil parishes, which form a third tier of local government for their areas.

The council owns significant heritage assets that include monuments such as Guildford Castle, as well museums, art collections and civic regalia.

The council has shared a chief executive with neighbouring Waverley Borough Council since 2021.

=== Political control ===
The council has been under Liberal Democrat majority control since the 2023 election.

Political control of the old municipal borough council from 1836 to 1974 was as follows:

Party in control	Years
Conservative	1836–1875
No overall control	1875–1877
Conservative	1877–1879
No overall control	1879–1880
Conservative	1880–1883
No overall control	1883–1885
Conservative	1885–1888
Liberal	1888–1889
Conservative	1889–1892
No overall control	1892–1892
Liberal	1892–1894
No overall control	1894–1895
Liberal	1895–1898
No overall control	1898–1899
Independent	1899–1957
No overall control	1957–1965
Conservative	1965–1972
No overall control	1972–1974

Political control of the modern borough council since the 1974 reforms has been as follows:

Party in control	Years
Conservative	1974–1991
No overall control	1991–1995
Liberal Democrats	1995–1997
No overall control	1997–2003
Conservative	2003–2019
No overall control	2019–2023
Liberal Democrats	2023–present

=== Leadership ===
The role of mayor is largely ceremonial in Guildford. Political leadership is instead provided by the leader of the council. The leaders since 2010 have been:

Councillor	Party	From	To
Tony Rooth	Conservative	May 2010	11 Oct 2012
Stephen Mansbridge	Conservative	11 Oct 2012	19 Oct 2015
Paul Spooner	Conservative	9 Dec 2015	May 2019
Caroline Reeves	Liberal Democrats	15 May 2019	22 Sep 2020
Joss Bigmore	Residents for Guildford and Villages	6 Oct 2020	22 Sep 2022
Julia McShane	Liberal Democrats	11 Oct 2022	

=== Composition ===
Following the 2023 election the composition of the council was:

Party	Councillors
Liberal Democrats	25
Conservative	10
Residents for Guildford and Villages	7
Guildford Greenbelt Group	3
Labour	3
Total	48

=== Elections ===
Since the last boundary changes in 2023 the council has comprised 48 councillors representing 21 wards, with each ward electing one, two or three councillors. Elections were held every four years.

Further full borough council elections were cancelled in 2026, and an election for the new West Surrey Council was held instead. West Surrey Council will formally come into being and take over local government functions in the area on 1 April 2027, at which point Guildford Borough Council and the borough of Guildford will be abolished.

==== Members of Parliament ====
The borough straddles five parliamentary constituencies:

Constituency	Member of Parliament	Political party
Godalming and Ash	Jeremy Hunt	Conservative
Guildford	Zöe Franklin	Liberal Democrats
Surrey Heath	Al Pinkerton	Liberal Democrats
Woking	Will Forster	Liberal Democrats
Dorking and Horley	Chris Coghlan	Liberal Democrats

=== Premises ===
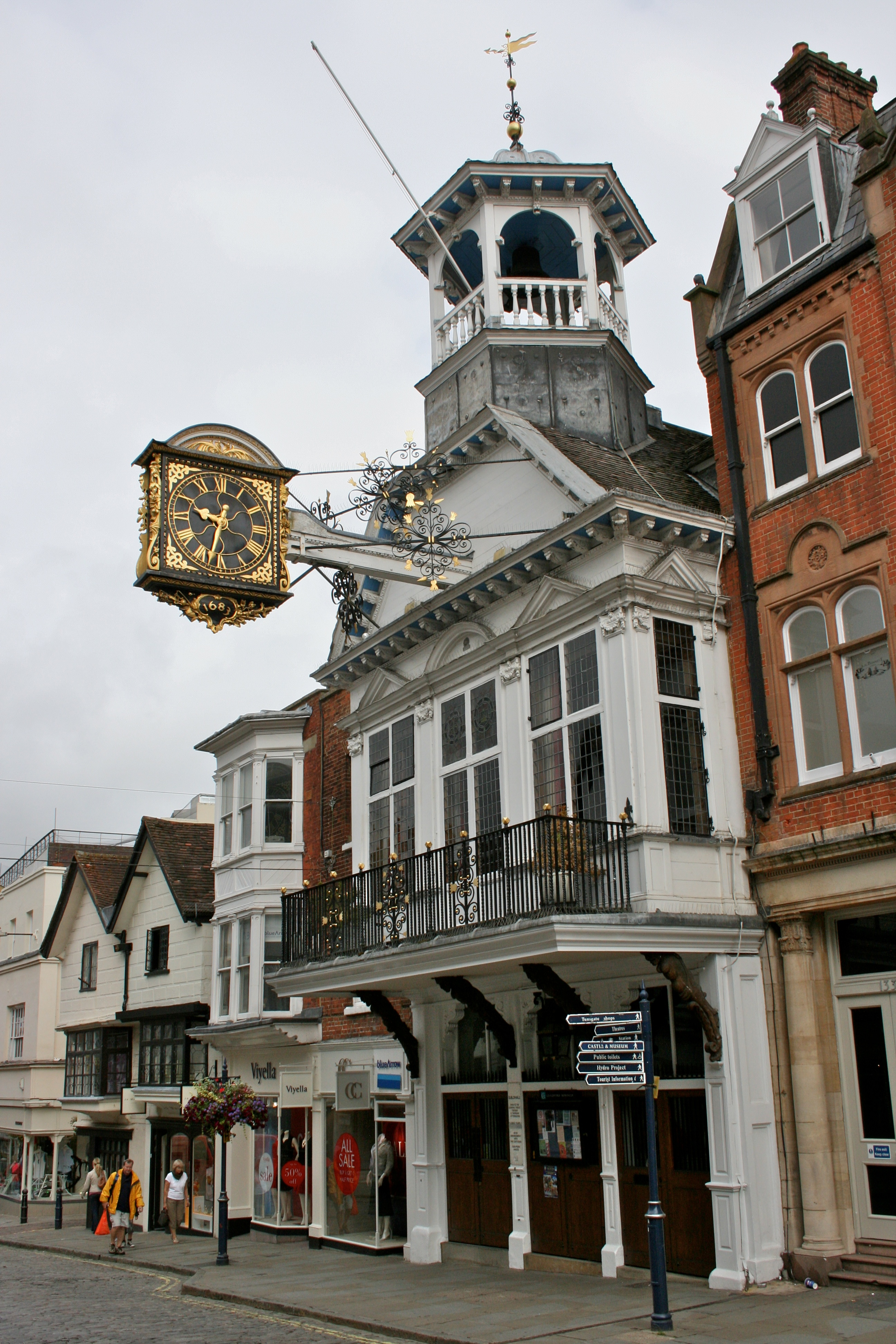
Guildhall: Used for council's annual meetings.

The council is based at Millmead House on Millmead in Guildford. The original house dates from the late seventeenth century, with extensive modern additions to the rear. Prior to the local government reorganisation of 1974, the building had been the headquarters of Guildford Rural District Council. The council's annual meeting when new mayors are appointed each May is held at Guildford Guildhall.

== Demography ==
Guildford has the second largest population of Surrey's eleven districts (based on census statistics, only 600 residents behind Reigate and Banstead). Approximately half of the borough's population live in the town of Guildford.

== Parishes ==
The central part of the borough, corresponding to the pre-1974 borough and covering the majority of the Guildford built-up area, is an unparished area. This area includes Bellfields, Boxgrove, Onslow Village, Park Barn, Stoughton, Westborough, and the (former) villages of Burpham, and Merrow.

The rest of the borough is covered by civil parishes:

- Albury
- Artington
- Ash
- Ash Vale
- Compton
- East Clandon
- East Horsley
- Effingham
- Normandy
- Ockham
- Pirbright
- Puttenham
- Ripley
- Seale and Sands
- Send
- Shackleford
- Shalford
- Shere
- St Martha
- Tongham
- Wanborough
- West Clandon
- West Horsley
- Wisley
- Worplesdon

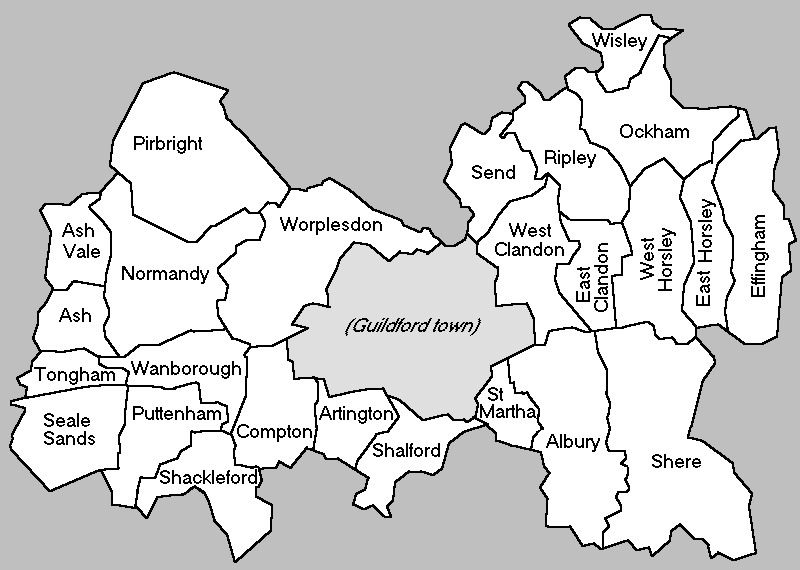
Map of Guildford Borough showing its parts: Guildford town and civil parishes which provide an additional layer of government.

== Notes and references ==
Notes
