= Ernest Austen =

Ernest Austen may refer to:

- Ernest Austen (cricketer) (1900–1983), Australian cricketer
- Ernest Edward Austen (1867–1938), English entomologist
- Ernie Austen (1891–1985), Australian racewalker

== See also ==
- Ernest Austin (1874–1947), English composer, music arranger and editor
- Ernest Austin (murderer) (1890–1913), Australian criminal, the last person to receive capital punishment in Queensland
