= Spencer Leigh =

Spencer Leigh may refer to:

- Spencer Leigh (actor) (born circa 1963), a British TV and film actor.
- Spencer Leigh (radio presenter) (born 1945), a BBC Radio Merseyside presenter and author.
- Spencer Austen-Leigh (1834–1913), English cricketer
- Spencer Leigh Hughes (1858–1920), British engineer, journalist, and politician
