= Augustus Austen Leigh =

English college administrator (1840–1905)

Augustus Austen Leigh (1840–1905) was the 32nd provost of King's College, Cambridge. He was the sixth son of J. Edward Austen (after 1836 Austen Leigh, vicar of Bray (Berks) and of Emma Smith (d. 1876), daughter of Charles Smith of Suttons in Essex. His grandfather was James Austen, the eldest brother of author Jane Austen. His brothers, Arthur, Charles, Cholmeley and Spencer were all first-class cricketers.

Born at Wargrave, Berkshire, he was educated at Eton College and entered King's College, in 1859. He earned the members' prize in 1862, and graduated B.A. in 1863, M.A. in 1866.

Austen Leigh was appointed a tutor at the college from 1868 to 1881, and was dean from 1871 to 1873 and 1882–5, and vice-provost from 1877 to 1889. He succeeded Richard Okes as provost on 9 February 1889. He held various other positions, including president of the Cambridge University Musical Society from 1883, and president of Cambridge University Cricket Club from 1886 to 1904.
