= Richard Woking =

English politician

Richard Woking (fl. 1404–1426), of Guildford, Surrey, was an English politician.

He was a Member (MP) of the Parliament of England for Guildford in 1420 and December 1421. He was Mayor of Guildford in 1417–18, 1422–23, and 1425–26.
