= Kirsten Saxton =

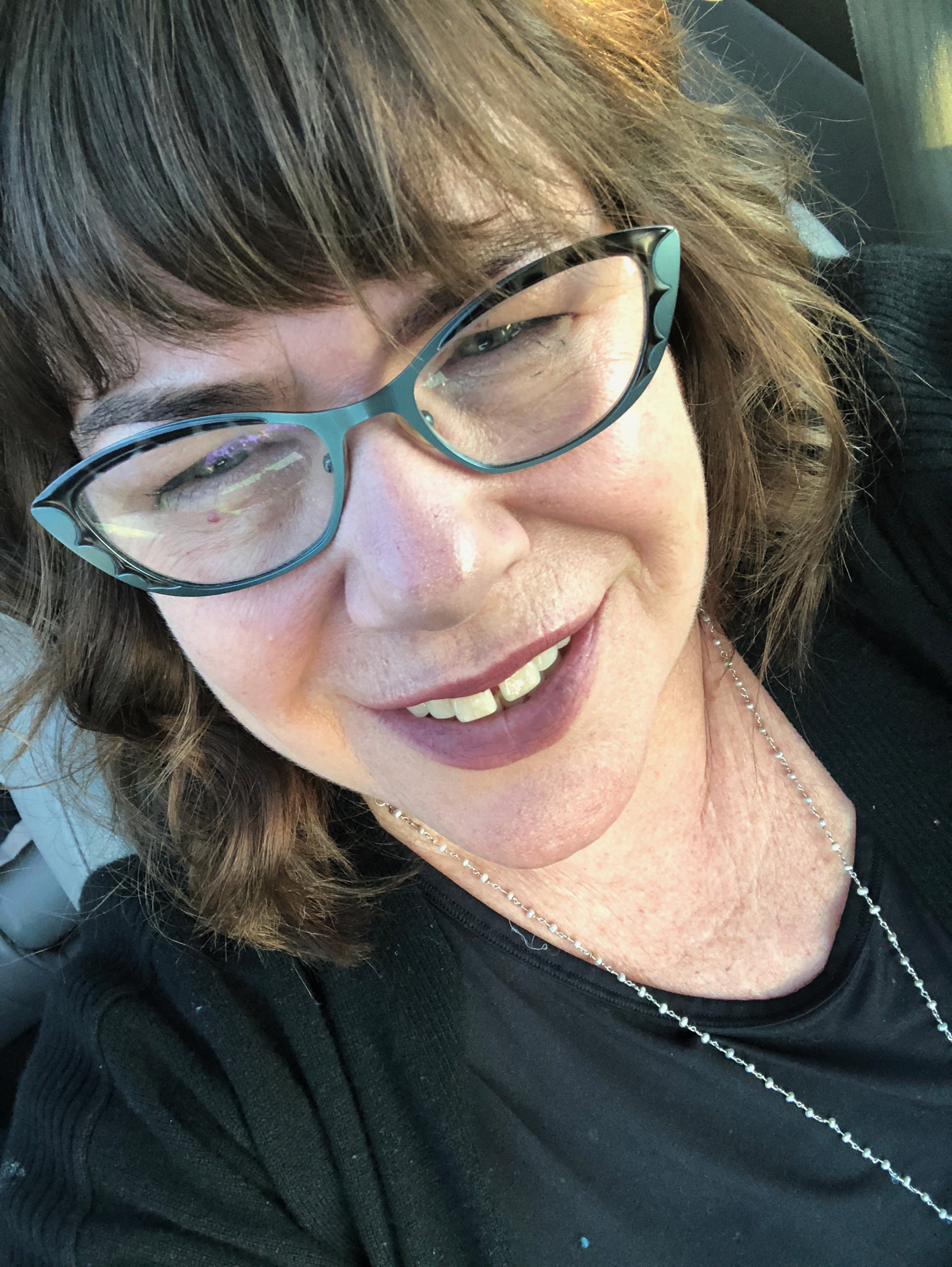
- Kirsten Saxton
- Education: University of California, Davis and Mills College
- Occupations: Professor of English at Mills College, author.
- Writing career
- Language: English
- Genre: 18th Century Studies

Kirsten Saxton is a professor of English at Mills College in Oakland, California where she is also the director of the MA of English.

== Career ==
Saxton writes about 18th century literature and culture, early British women writers, and the history of the novel in English, focusing on intersections between literature, criminality and sexuality in relation to gender.

Recently, Saxton wrote the scholarly introduction to the British Library re-issue of the detective novel The Incredible Crime by Lois Austen-Leigh which had been out of print since 1931.

Saxton's Narratives of Women and Murder in England was cited as a "compelling and provocative study ... to be welcomed for the light it begins to shed on one of our enduring objects of cultural fascination." (Devereaux, 2010)

In 2000, Saxton co-edited with Rebecca P. Bocchicchio, a volume of essays on the work of Eliza Haywood which was hailed as marking a "pivotal moment in Haywood scholarship" (Merritt, 2001).

Saxton is an editor for ABO: Interactive Journal for Women in the Arts, 1640-1830, and is currently co-chair of the National Women’s Caucus of the American Society for Eighteenth-Century Studies.

== Publications ==
- Adapting the Eighteenth Century: A Handbook of Pedagogies and Practices (with Sharron R. Harrow, University of Rochester Press, 2020)
- "Introduction". The Incredible Crime. Lois Austin-Leigh. (2017)
- Narratives of Women and Murder in England (2009 / 2016)
- The Passionate Fictions of Eliza Haywood: Essays On her Life and Work. Editor. (2000)

== Selected awards ==
=== Teaching ===
- Undergraduate Teaching Prize given by The Southeastern American Society For Eighteenth-Century Studies (2016).
- Mary Metz Professorship, Mills College (2008)
- Sarlo Award for Excellence in Teaching, University of California (2006)

=== Selected research fellowships ===
- Visiting Fellow, Lucy Cavendish College, University of Cambridge, Cambridge, England (2015)
- Mary Ann Kincaid Award for Research in Digital Humanities, Mills College (2015)
- Huntington Library Summer Research Fellowship (2014)
