= Guildford Castle =

Castle in Surrey, England

- Surrey, England
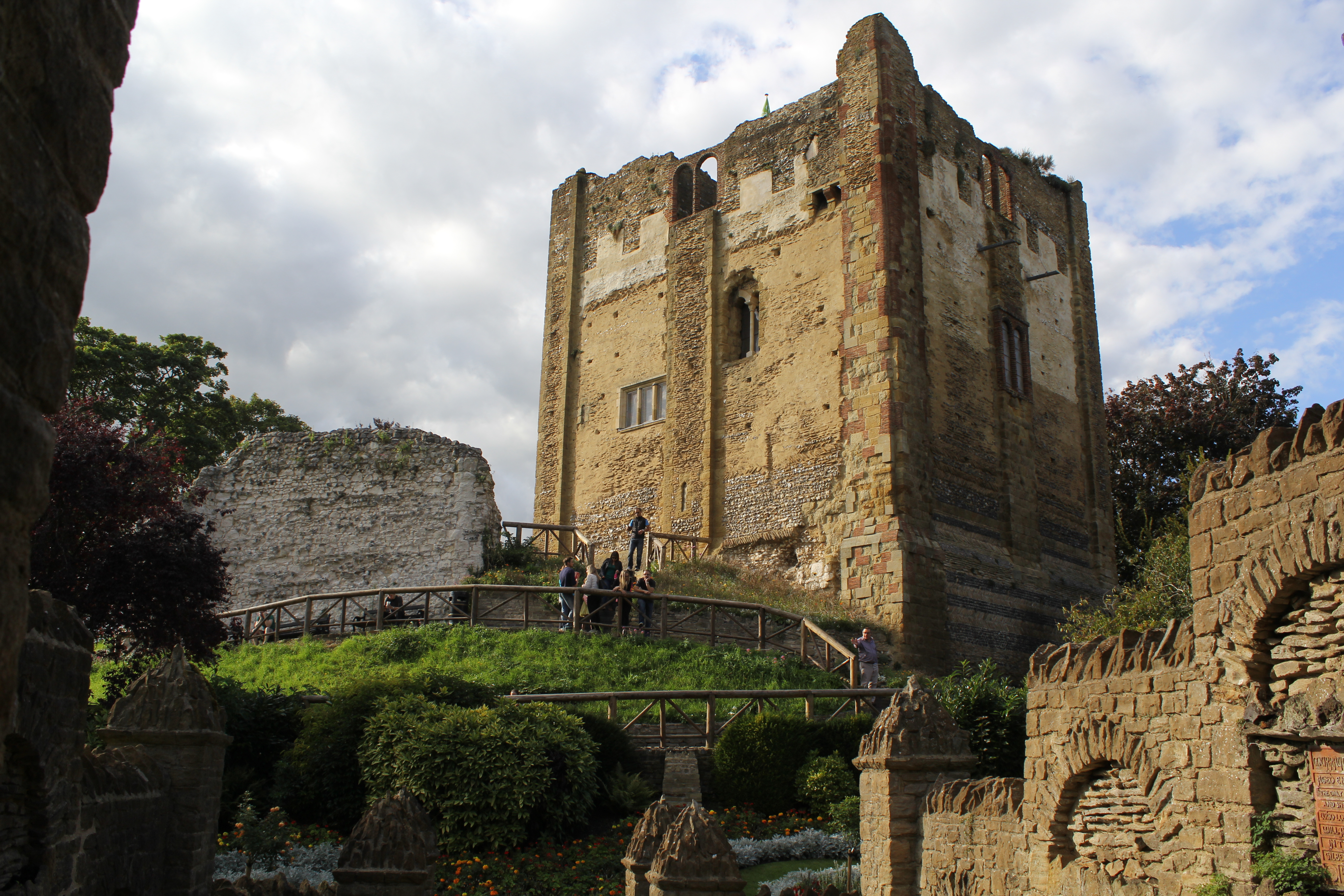
- The keep of Guildford Castle

Site information
- Type: Motte and bailey
- Owner: Guildford Borough Council
- Open to the public: Yes
- Condition: Ruined

Location
- Shown within Surrey
- Coordinates: 51°14′04″N 0°34′21″W
- Grid reference: SU 99768 49312

Site history
- Materials: Bargate stone
- Events

Scheduled monument
- Official name: Guildford Castle
- Designated: 1 January 1920
- Reference no.: 1012340

Listed Building – Grade I
- Official name: Castle Keep, Guildford
- Designated: 1 May 1953
- Reference no.: 1377881

Guildford Castle is in Guildford, Surrey, England. It is thought to have been built by William the Conqueror, or one of his barons, shortly after the 1066 invasion of England.

== History ==
=== From the eleventh to the thirteenth century ===
==== Construction and development ====
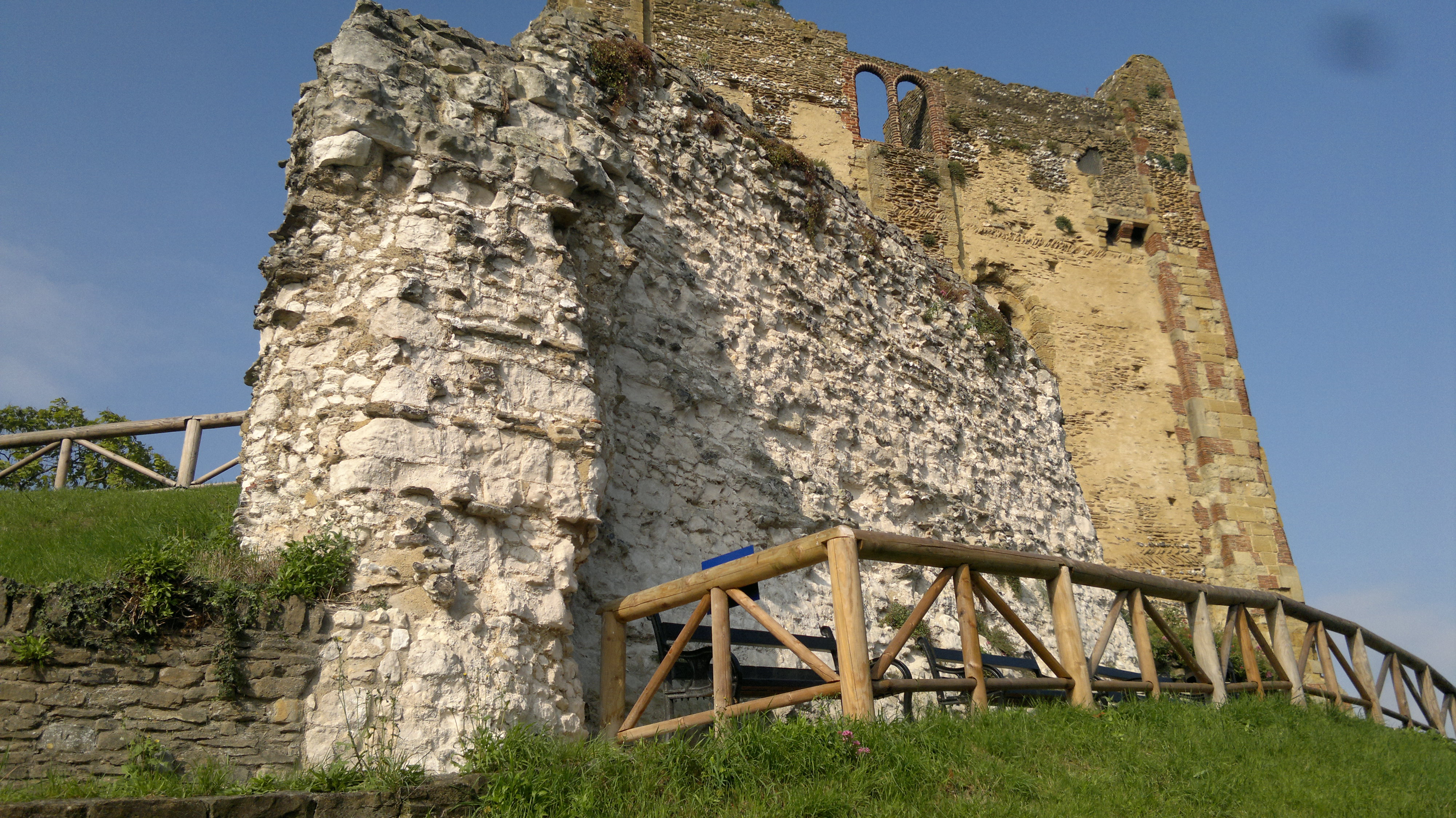
The ruins of the shell keep in front of the later tower keep

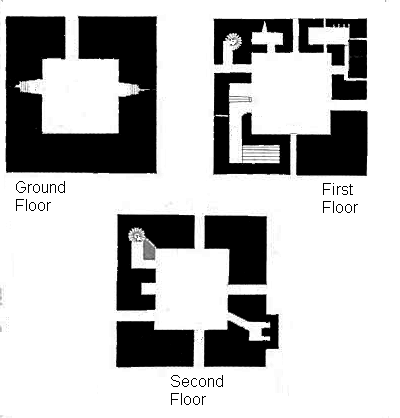
Floor plan of the castle keep

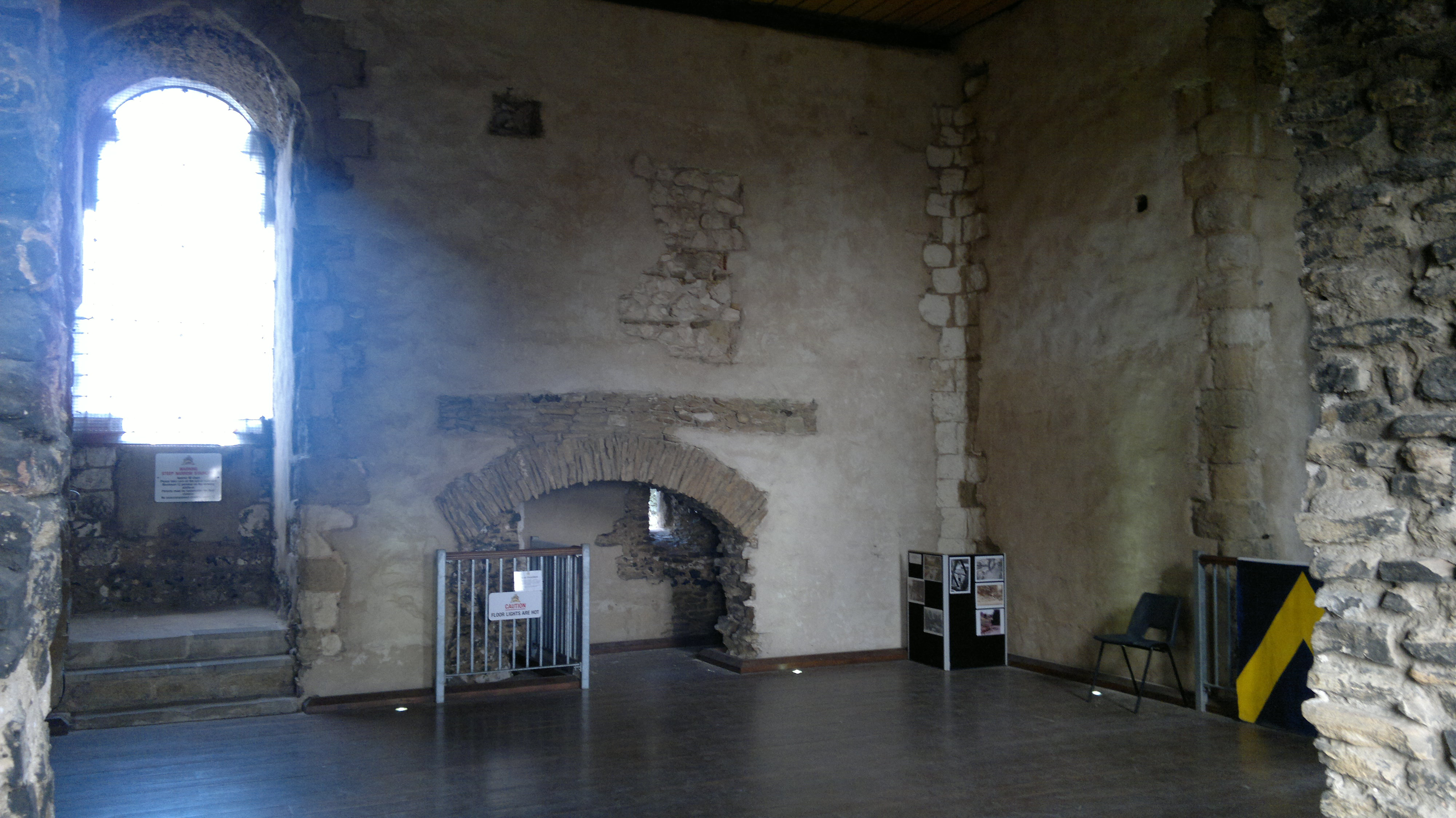
The great hall on the first floor of the keep

After the Battle of Hastings in 1066 William led his army to Canterbury and then sacked towns along the Pilgrims' Way, including Guildford. Later William, or one of his barons, built Guildford Castle. There is no record of it in the Domesday Book of 1086, so construction probably started after that date.

First to be built at the Castle would have been the motte (a mound) around which was a ditch and a bailey protected by a wooden palisade. The bailey's boundary would have run along Castle Street, South Hill, what is now Racks Close and parallel with Quarry Street (although slightly to the east). If it followed a typical Norman design the bailey would have been divided with a palisade into two parts, the outer and inner bailey. The inner bailey would have encompassed the motte on which a wooden keep would have been built as a look-out post for the soldiers stationed there.

Late 11th or early 12th century, a wall made of Bargate stone was built around the top of the motte creating what is known as a shell keep, and then around the 1130s a keep (tower) was added, again made of Bargate stone from nearby Godalming bonded with hard and durable mortar. The keep may have been built over part of the shell keep and its foundations went down to the chalk bedrock. The general form was quadrangular, its exterior dimensions being 47 feet (14 m) by 45.5 feet (13.9 m). The walls are about 10 feet (3.0 m) thick at the base and taper towards the top.

The keep had a ground and first floor with the entrance located in the first floor to aid in defence. The keep was most likely used as a private apartment for the King. The ground floor was windowless. On the first floor there was a main chamber, a chapel, and wardrobe with latrine. A second floor was added shortly afterwards containing a two-seater latrine. The addition of the second floor made the keep over 70 feet (21 m) high. The roof of the building was made of lead and the inner walls were covered in plaster and then whitewashed.

In the 12th century the King moved to better apartments located in the bailey. The main bailey buildings would have included a great hall, apartments for the King and Queen and their chapels. The great hall is thought to have been located at the site of the two houses at the bottom of Castle Hill and was made of stone. Henry III made a number of improvements in the 13th century which resulted in the castle being known as a palace. The Queen's apartment was improved with large new windows and two marble columns were added. The great hall was decorated with coloured glass windows and paintings. King Henry had his room painted green with gold and silver stars and he also built a garden surrounded by marble columns. A fire damaged the hall in 1254 but the changes to the buildings continued.

Henry purchased some extra land in 1245 to extend the bailey so allow him to build a set of rooms for Edward, his son and heir to the throne, which were completed in 1246. The gate at Quarry Street was completed in 1256 which suggests that Henry made changes to the castle but no evidence of the previous gate (thought to have been opposite Tunsgate) remains.

==== Military use ====
The castle was mainly used as a royal residence but it was also a fortress and did play a part in warfare and although the Castle was never attacked it was strengthened at various points in its history.

The keep is thought to have been heightened during the civil war which took place during Stephen's reign (1135–1154) and during the rebellion of Henry II's sons (the revolt of 1173–1174) the castle was strengthened.

On 9 July 1216 Prince Louis took possession of the castle during the First Barons' War against King John, but the castle was not a scene of conflict.

During the rebellion of Simon de Montfort in the 1260s, there was no fighting either. However King Henry III's son Prince Edward (the future Edward I) did capture a rebel named Adam Gurdon in a battle at Alton and brought him to Guildford Castle. It was used as a mustering point during King Edward I's foreign wars.

==== Constables and sheriffs ====
In 1218 (the 10th year of the reign of Henry III), William de Coniers was constable of the castle; in the 39th of the same reign (1247), that office was held by Elias de Maunsel; and in Henry's 51st year (1259), the custody of the castle was in trusted to William de Aguillon, the then sheriff of Surrey; probably, in order that it might be used for a prison. In 1307 (the 35th year of the reign of Edward I) Edward de Say, the keeper of the King's prisoners had orders to repair the prison. In 1322 (the 15th year of the reign of Edward II), Oliver de Burdegala was governor. In 1337 Sir John de Brocas was made constable. In 1367 (the 41st year of the reign of Edward III), it was given to Andrew Sackville, sheriff of Surrey and Sussex both for a prison and as a dwelling. In 1377 (In the 1st year of the reign of Richard II) Sir Simon Burleigh (who had been tutor to Richard), was constable.

=== From the fourteenth to the twentieth century ===
Guildford, along with some other royal inland castles, was no longer needed for defence and was neglected. From the 1360s a royal moated hunting lodge (situated on the other side the river from the castle) was improved and enlarged, so royalty chose to stay there when visiting the area rather than the castle. The royal apartments at the castle were neglected and by 1379 only the King's great chamber remained, the rest of the royal apartments having decayed beyond repair.

This castle keep continued to be used as the common gaol for both Surrey and Sussex until 1487 (in the third year of the reign of Henry VII), when the inhabitants of Sussex petitioned parliament that the prisoners be moved to Lewes, which had a more secure establishment and location. The petition was granted. In 1544 John Daborne was made keeper of the castle garden. His family were involved with the castle for the rest of the 16th century and is thought to have been they who added the brick windows and fireplaces. In 1611 the castle estate was granted to Francis Carter by James I. In the 1630s, once the tower's roof was removed, it was used as a cockpit. Areas of the castle grounds were used for farming and rented out to various people. Around 1820 the Duke of Norfolk purchased it. In 1885 Lord Grantley of Wonersh, who owned a large part of the castle, sold it to the Guildford Corporation. The tower and walls were restored and opened to the public as pleasure gardens in 1888 to mark Queen Victoria's Golden Jubilee of the previous year.

== Twenty-first century ==
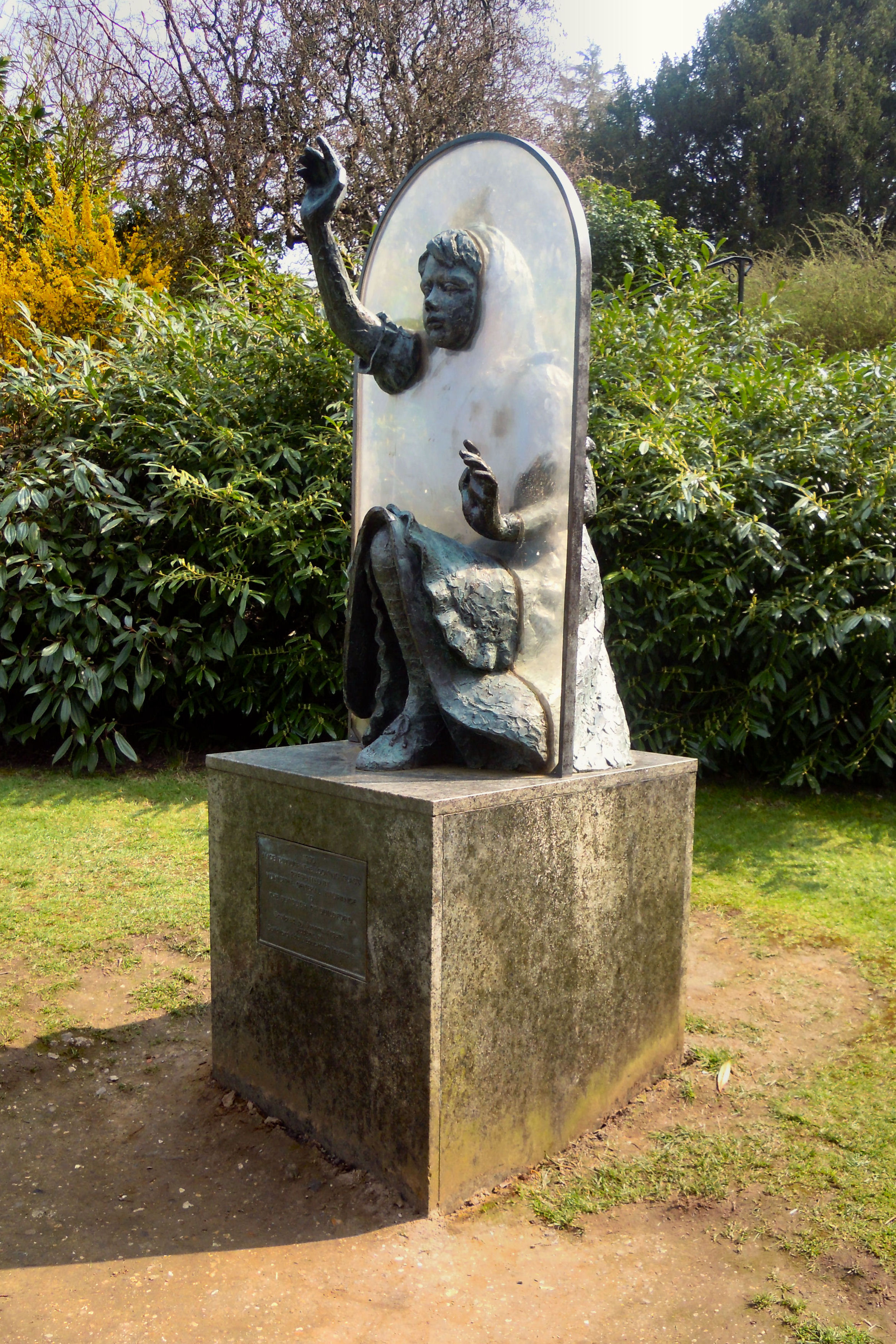
Statue of Alice Through the Looking Glass in the castle grounds

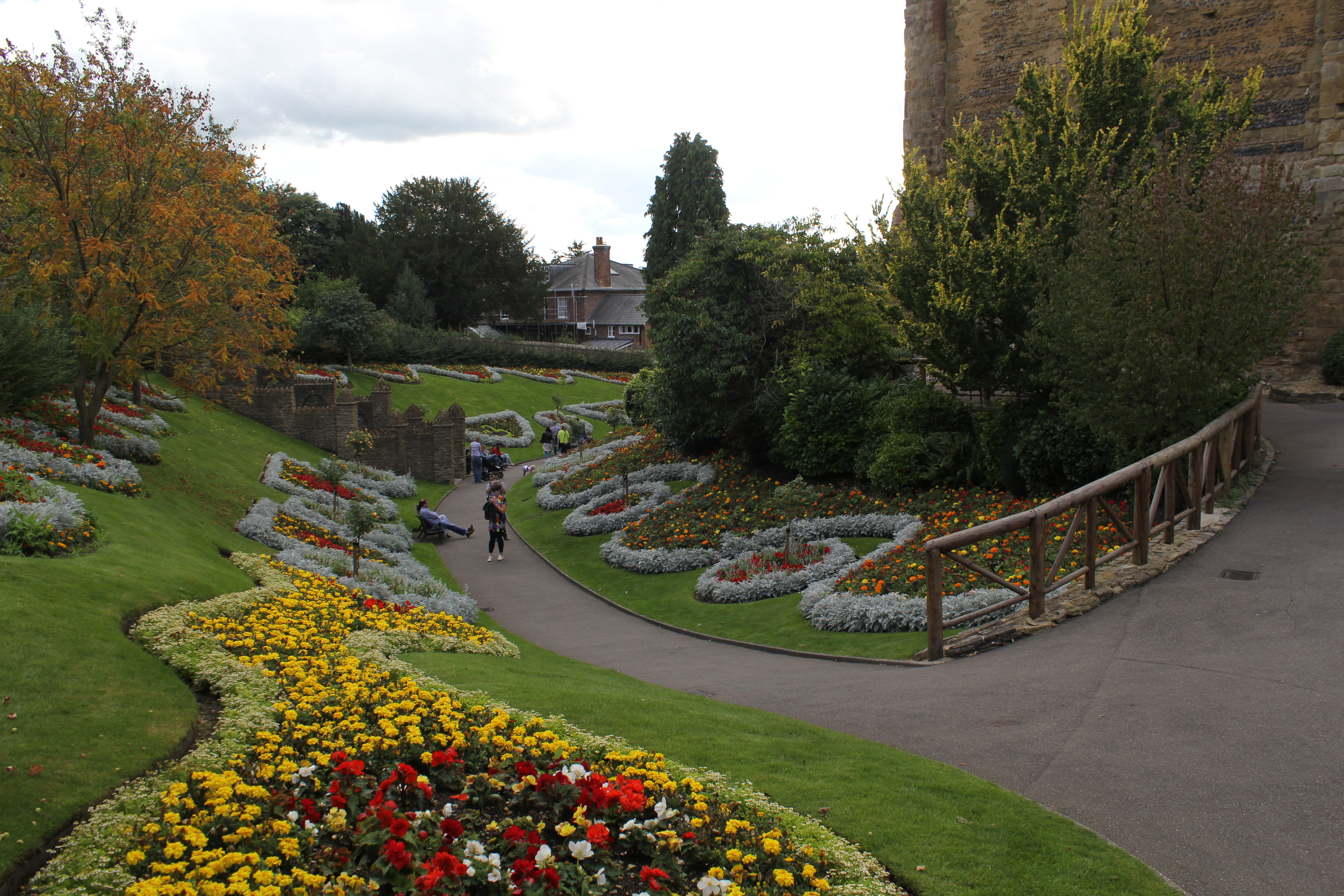
The surrounding moat is now occupied by gardens

The gardens are "extremely popular, displaying an amazing array of colourful bedding, centred on the 12th-century Castle Keep", and include a life-size statue of Alice Through the Looking Glass, which is a memorial to Lewis Carroll who lived nearby in The Chestnuts, his sisters' house, from 1868 until he died in 1898.

Starting in 2003 there was a year-long conservation project. The keep was partially renovated, and the first floor was floored and roofed. During this project original features such as crenellations were found to still exist. The keep now contains a visitor centre, open between April and September, that includes written panels describing the history of the castle and a model of the place as it appeared in about 1300. The roof of the tower is reachable by a staircase which allows views of the grounds and parts of Guildford.

The castle's old gatehouse now houses part of Guildford Museum, a local history and archaeology museum with a specialist needlework collection.
