= Lois Austen-Leigh =

British writer

- Born: Lois Emma Austen-Leigh; 10 July 1883; Winterbourne, Gloucestershire, England
- Died: 14 February 1968 (aged 84); Aldeburgh, England
- Father: Arthur Austen-Leigh
- Family: James Austen (great-grandfather); Augustus Austen Leigh (uncle)

Lois Emma Austen-Leigh (10 July 1883 – 14 February 1968) was an English writer and war volunteer. She authored four mystery novels in the 1930s.

== Biography ==
Austen-Leigh was born in Winterbourne, Gloucestershire, where her father Arthur Austen-Leigh was Rector. She was the great-granddaughter of James Austen (Jane Austen's brother) and granddaughter of James Edward Austen-Leigh. She had three sisters and three brothers. The family later moved to Wargrave, Berkshire, and the four girls attended St Swithun's School, Winchester (then Winchester High School for Girls). Austen-Leigh kept diary entries from 1898 to 1906. She became familiar with Cambridge University (the setting of her novel The Incredible Crime) through her uncle Augustus Austen Leigh.

During the First World War, Austen-Leigh worked as a gardener for the Reading Red Cross, while her sister Honor volunteered as a nurse and her brothers Arthur (d. 1918) and Lionel joined the Army. After caring for her aunt until her death, the two sisters moved to the newly built Cob House on Saxmundham Road in Aldeburgh, Suffolk. Here, they befriended the likes of composer Benjamin Britten and author M. R. James.

At the desk of her great-great aunt, Austen-Leigh wrote four mystery novels, which would be published by Herbert Jenkins: The Incredible Crime (1931), set at a fictional college of Cambridge and Wellende Old Hall in Suffolk; The Haunted Farm (1932); Rude Justice (1936); and The Gobblecock Mystery (1938). Austen-Leigh was modest about her own writing and abandoned it after the Second World War, during which she and her sister worked in local emergency services.

Following decades out-of-print, The Incredible Crime was re-published under the British Library Crime Classics banner in 2017. The re-print was edited and introduced by Kirsten Saxton. The Incredible Crime has drawn comparisons to Dorothy Sayers' Gaudy Night (1935) and Mavis Doriel Hay's Death on the Cherwell (1935).

== Bibliography ==
=== Novels ===
- The Incredible Crime (1931)
- The Haunted Farm (1932)
- Rude Justice (1936)
- The Gobblecock Mystery (1938)
