= John Austen =

John Austen may refer to:

- John Austen (illustrator) (1886–1948), English book illustrator
- John Austen (died 1572), MP for Guildford
- Sir John Austen, 2nd Baronet (c. 1640–1699), MP for Rye 1667–1679 and 1689– (Austen Baronets of Bexley, Kent)
- Sir John Austen, 1st Baronet (died 1742), MP for Middlesex 1701–1702, 1709–1710 and 1722–1727 (Austen Baronets of Derehams, Middlesex)

== See also ==
- John Austin (disambiguation)
