= 1973 Guildford Borough Council election =

Election in Surrey, England

The first ever Guildford Borough Council full-council elections were held on 7 June 1973. The Conservatives won control of the council with a majority of 16, winning 29 of the 42 seats.

The Local Government Act 1972 decreed that a new Guildford Borough Council was to replace the previous two councils for the area, namely the town council, Guildford Municipal Borough Council, and the council for the rural area surrounding Guildford, Guildford Rural District Council. The wards used for this election were largely based on the previously wards used by Guildford Municipal Borough Council and the parish boundaries of Guildford Rural District Council.

There was some alteration to the wards in the run up to the election, but full scale rewarding would only be implemented in time for the 1976 council elections. Changes included Friary ward and St Nicolas ward being merged with 3 councillors for the new joint ward; they had previously been separate wards with 3 councillors each on Guildford Municipal Borough Council. Holy Trinity ward and Stoughton ward each saw the number of councillors represent them reduce from 3 to 2. Merrow and Burpham ward, which at this point included much of what was from 1976 onwards to become the Christchurch ward, saw its representation increase from 3 to 5 councillors.

The new council was initially to be elected once every 3 years (this was to change to once every 4 years from 1979 onwards). This replaced the annual elections, where one third of councillors were elected each year, which had previously been used for elections to Guildford Municipal Borough Council.

Going into the election the councillors for the town wards under the old Guildford Municipal Borough Council were as follows - Friary (2 Lib, 1 Lab), St Nicolas (2 Lib, 1 Con), Stoke (3 Lab), Westborough (3 Lab), Holy Trinity (3 Con), Merrow & Burpham (3 Con), Onslow (3 Con), Stoughton (3 Con). Thus Friary & St Nicolas was predominantly Liberal, Stoke and Westborough were Labour plus Holy Trinity, Merrow & Burpham, Onslow and Stoughton were Conservative going into the election. With one exception those allegiances were maintained in the 1973 council elections.

The Liberals took all 3 councillors for the new Friary & St Nicolas ward. Labour retained all 6 councillors in its two strongholds Stoke and Westborough. The Conservatives won all the seats in Merrow & Burpham, Onslow and Stoughton wards. However, in Holy Trinity ward a change to previous voting behaviour occurred in that an official Liberal Party candidate took a seat for the first time in Holy Trinity's history; the ward having been created in 1899. This resulted in Holy Trinity ward being split 1 Conservative, 1 Liberal.

All bar 3 of the councillors elected for wards within the area formerly covered by Guildford Rural District Council were Conservatives. The three exceptions were 2 Independents were returned for Albury, Shere & St Martha's, plus one of the three councillors elected for East Clandon, West Clandon, East Horsley & West Horsley was a Liberal, the other two being Conservatives.

Overall the election results were Conservatives 29, Labour 6, Liberals 5, Independents 2.

== Results by ward ==
Albury, Shere & St Martha's (top 2 candidates elected)
Party	Candidate	Votes	%	±%
Independent	Mrs M Elston	990		
Independent	G Witheridge	847		
Conservative	W Whiting	805		
Conservative	Mrs Dent	768		
Majority		42		
Turnout				

Artington, Compton, Puttenham, Seale and Tongham, Shackleford & Wanborough (top 2 candidates elected)
Party	Candidate	Votes	%	±%
Conservative	LR Gillingham	962		
Conservative	JP Moore	897		
Independent	Mrs DM Bond	560		
Independent	Miss ND Fox	323		
Labour	Mrs DF Saunders	230		
Labour	K Horne	227		
Majority		337		
Turnout				

Ash (top 5 candidates elected)
Party	Candidate	Votes	%	±%
Conservative	Mrs IF Towler	1644		
Conservative	JG Ades	1550		
Conservative	Mrs RC Hall	1550		
Conservative	SA Lunn	1547		
Conservative	RN Renton	1435		
Labour	Mrs J Curwell	883		
Labour	PA Hawthorne	832		
Labour	GB Smith	789		
Labour	AR Roberts	775		
Liberal	RJ Leigh	755		
Labour	BC Winter	717		
Independent Conservative	PH Cody	518		
Majority		552		
Turnout				

East Clandon, West Clandon, East Horsley & West Horsley (top 3 candidates elected)
Party	Candidate	Votes	%	±%
Liberal	Mrs PM Iliff	1811		
Conservative	J Skene-Brown	1562		
Conservative	D May	1493		
Conservative	D Blackstone	1250		
Liberal	W Pearson	1226		
Liberal	E Oxford	1100		
Labour	Mrs J Haimes	214		
Labour	Mrs J Henmand	151		
Majority		243		
Turnout				

Effingham (only 1 candidate elected)
Party	Candidate	Votes	%	±%
Conservative	BP Tyrwhitt-Drake	unopposed		

Friary & St. Nicolas (top 3 candidates elected)
Party	Candidate	Votes	%	±%
Liberal	Dr RE Blundell	1235		
Liberal	RG Marks	1159		
Liberal	Mrs M Bateman	1107		
Conservative	G Stuart-Hill	721		
Conservative	BJ Gibbs	712		
Conservative	Mrs FM Puttock	705		
Labour	F Adams	369		
Labour	Mrs CA Rogers	294		
Labour	CP Gale	288		
Majority		386		
Turnout				

Holy Trinity (top 2 candidates elected)
Party	Candidate	Votes	%	±%
Conservative	CJK Boyce	858		
Liberal	BAH Banks	766		
Conservative	DJA Morgan	732		
Liberal	PJ Stokoe	581		
Independent	Mrs E Nicklin	478		
Labour	BO Lloyd	191		
Majority		26		
Turnout				

Merrow & Burpham (top 5 candidates elected)
Party	Candidate	Votes	%	±%
Conservative	Mrs MM Walls	2276		
Conservative	RH Beatrip	1963		
Conservative	SR Brearley	1900		
Conservative	JP Twining	1887		
Conservative	SN Trusty	1800		
Liberal	Mrs GM Oldfield	1173		
Liberal	Mrs MA Walton	1145		
Liberal	RM Wilson	1063		
Liberal	BRM Avery	1062		
Liberal	AR Dakers	1045		
Labour	P Henderson	523		
Labour	MP Hill	490		
Labour	G Hall	470		
Labour	RSL Rees	438		
Labour	Mrs GCD Lines	423		
Majority		627		
Turnout				

Normandy (only 1 candidate elected)
Party	Candidate	Votes	%	±%
Conservative	AA Cook	499		
Labour	PJ Dyson	344		
Majority		155		
Turnout				

Onslow (top 3 candidates elected)
Party	Candidate	Votes	%	±%
Conservative	Mrs PE Harding	1118		
Conservative	RM Hardy	1090		
Conservative	DE Steer	963		
Liberal	R Symes-Schutzmann	816		
Liberal	Mrs B Harris	800		
Liberal	Dr S Harris	797		
Labour	RT Rogers	685		
Labour	BA Naish	616		
Labour	Mrs PM Coyle	597		
Majority		147		
Turnout				

Pirbright (only 1 candidate elected)
Party	Candidate	Votes	%	±%
Conservative	D Gibbs	310		
Independent	CJ Hendon	258		
Majority		52		
Turnout				

Ripley, Wisley & Ockham (only 1 candidate elected)
Party	Candidate	Votes	%	±%
Conservative	RHA Amis	unopposed		

Send (top 2 candidates elected)
Party	Candidate	Votes	%	±%
Conservative	Mrs MH Sanger	793		
Conservative	SE Roberts	721		
Liberal	Mrs GM Blundell	589		
Liberal	Mrs JM Copeland	444		
Labour	J Cox	123		
Majority		132		
Turnout				

Shalford (only 1 candidate elected)
Party	Candidate	Votes	%	±%
Conservative	Mrs ECS Stewart	603		
Independent	GA Goulty	471		
Labour	J Fahy	201		
Majority		132		
Turnout				

Stoke (top 3 candidates elected)
Party	Candidate	Votes	%	±%
Labour	GR Bellerby	1790		
Labour	RGK Burgess	1521		
Labour	Mrs E Pullan	1397		
Conservative	AJE Hodges	1166		
Conservative	WR Jordan	1146		
Conservative	FH Nicholson	1124		
Majority		231		
Turnout				

Stoughton (top 2 candidates elected)
Party	Candidate	Votes	%	±%
Conservative	LJ May	1061		
Conservative	RE Price	1003		
Labour	OJE Sefton	554		
	Mrs LM Harper	546		
Majority		449		
Turnout				

Westborough (top 3 candidates elected)
Party	Candidate	Votes	%	±%
Labour	Mrs DW Bellerby	1434		
Labour	JRG Dale	1296		
Labour	JB Patrick	1159		
Liberal	KG Briggs	868		
Liberal	PW Tidy	803		
Liberal	PA Toovey	771		
Conservative	DJ Puttock	478		
Conservative	Mrs PC Jenner	451		
Conservative	Mrs BM Woodhatch	445		
Majority		291		
Turnout				

Worplesdon (top 2 candidates elected)
Party	Candidate	Votes	%	±%
Conservative	Mrs SE Simkins	825		
Conservative	JC Henderson	755		
Independent	H Carter	663		
Majority		92		
Turnout				
