= The Magic House (TV series) =

1994–1996 British children's TV series

- Genre: Children's
- Created by: Joe Austen
- Written by: Joe Austen
- Directed by: Simon Staffurth; Adrian Edwards
- Starring: Peter Forbes; Symon Macintyre; Colin Purves; Julie Westwood; Brian Herring; Heather Fraser; Dave Murden; Michael Bayliss; Marie Phillips
- Theme music composer: Kim Goody; Alan Coates
- Opening theme: "We're So Happy to See You in the Magic House"
- Ending theme: "We're So Happy to See You in the Magic House" (Instrumental)
- Composers: Kim Goody; Alan Coates
- Country of origin: United Kingdom
- Original language: English

Production
- Executive producers: Sandy Ross; Rhoda MacDonald
- Producers: Adrian Edwards; John Price
- Editor: Robert Scott
- Running time: 10 minutes
- Production company: Scottish Television

Original release
- Network: ITV (CITV)
- Release: 1994 – 1996

The Magic House is a British children's television live-action puppet show created by Joe Austen, that was broadcast on Scottish Television from 7 January 1994 to 30 July 1996. The television programme was adapted from a series of children's books written and illustrated by Austen in the early 1980s. The show's 52 10-minute episodes were aired across the ITV Network between 1994 and 1996. As well as the television episodes, a spin-off series of books was also produced, written and illustrated by Joe Austen. The show, which featured Uncle Teapot, Kitty Kettle, Barney Bin and other characters based on household items, proved a success with the characters appearing in adverts for the Trustee Savings Bank for children's savings accounts. The show’s theme music is a pastiche of the Beatles song "It's All Too Much".

== Characters ==
- Barney Bin
- Bessy Brush
- Grandpa Clock
- HG Well
- Kitty Kettle
- PC Pot
- Soapy Bubbles
- Uncle Teapot
- Teddy Chair
- The Eggcups
- Jack Salt
- Paddy Pepper
- Sam Spade
- Waffle
- Peek, Gobble and Fluff

== Production and ownership ==
In 2001 the Dundee-based Austen bought back the rights to The Magic House and other shows produced by his Storyland company. Ownership of Storyland where previously in the hands of Carlton Television and Scottish Media Group in 2003.

=== Plans for a revival ===
In 2005, a new television series, as well as various types of books for the series, were planned to be developed.

== Episodes ==
Series	First air date	Last air date	Episodes
1	7 January 1994	1 July 1994	26
2	7 February 1995	2 May 1995	13
3	2 January 1996	30 July 1996	13

=== Series 1 ===
1. Moving Pictures - 7 January 1994
2. Air Fare - 14 January 1994
3. Apple Pie Bed - 21 January 1994
4. Ups & Downs - 28 January 1994
5. Down in the Dumps - 4 February 1994
6. Mirror Mirror - 11 February 1994
7. A Drop in the Bucket - 18 February 1994
8. Whats in the Box - 25 February 1994
9. Cat & Dog - 4 March 1994
10. Blind Mans Buff - 11 March 1994
11. Curious Cases - 18 March 1994
12. The Runaway Trees - 25 March 1994
13. Exercising - 1 April 1994
14. Sticking Together - 8 April 1994
15. Sound Asleep - 15 April 1994
16. Kind Hearts & Juicy Pies - 22 April 1994
17. Full Moon - 29 April 1994
18. Now You See Her - 6 May 1994
19. Big Blowout - 13 May 1994
20. Fast & Tight - 20 May 1994
21. Pig Business - 27 May 1994
22. Absent Friends - 3 June 1994
23. Ready Teddy Go - 10 June 1994
24. What A Balloon - 17 June 1994
25. Blowing Hot & Cold - 24 June 1994
26. Musical Chairs - 1 July 1994

=== Series 2 ===
1. The New Arrival (A.K.A Meet Waffle) - 7 February 1995
2. Colours and Painting - 14 February 1995
3. Soapy Bubble’s Little Troubles - 21 February 1995
4. Football on the Beach - 28 February 1995
5. The Waffle Cycle - 7 March 1995
6. Cloud Animals - 14 March 1995
7. Peek a Boo PC Pot - 21 March 1995
8. The Magic Watch - 28 March 1995
9. Trip to the Seaside - 2 May 1995
10. PC Pot’s Long Lost Relative - 9 May 1995
11. Barney Bin’s 5 Wishes - 16 May 1995
12. Food Marvellous Food - 23 May 1995
13. The Pantomime - 30 May 1995

=== Series 3 ===
1. Gobble, Peek and Fluff - 2 January 1996
2. The New Wonder Hat - 9 January 1996
3. The Wishing Tree - 16 January 1996
4. Dreamland - 23 January 1996
5. Follow the Leader - 30 January 1996
6. Winter Wonderland - 27 February 1996
7. Wibbly Wobbly - 5 March 1996
8. Guess The Music Instruments - 12 March 1996
9. Toys Everywhere - 19 March 1996
10. X Marks The Spot - 9 July 1996
11. Copies - 16 July 1996
12. Kitty's Birthday - 23 July 1996
13. It’s a Wonderful Life of Pc Pot - 30 July 1996
