= Cecil Austen =

Australian rules footballer (1918–2017)

Cec Austen
- Born: Victor Cecil Austen; 30 November 1918; Kew, Victoria
- Died: 29 October 2017 (aged 98)
Australian rules football career
Personal information
- Original team: Kew
- Height: 187 cm (6 ft 2 in)
- Weight: 85 kg (187 lb)
Playing career^{1}
Years	Club	Games (Goals)
1942	Hawthorn	5 (6)
- ^{1} Playing statistics correct to the end of 1942.
- Cricket career

Cricket information
- Batting: Right-handed
- Bowling: Right-arm fast-medium
- Role: Bowler

Domestic team information
- Years: Team
- 1945/46: South Australia

Career statistics
Competition	First-class
Matches	1
Runs scored	4
Batting average	2.00
100s/50s	0/0
Top score	2
Catches/stumpings	1/–
- Source: Cricinfo, 10 April 2018

Victor Cecil Austen (30 November 1918 – 29 October 2017) was an Australian sportsman who played first-class cricket for South Australia and Australian rules football in the Victorian Football League (VFL) with Hawthorn.

== Family ==
The son of Harold Cecil Austen (1883–1974), and Violet Hilda Austen (1891–1981), née Beer, Victor Cecil Austen was born at Kew, Victoria on 30 November 1918.

His son, the 1982 Liston Trophy winner Geoffrey Allen Austen (1953-), played senior VFL football with both Fitzroy and Collingwood, and VFA football with Preston; and both his brothers — the 1949 Brownlow Medal winner, Colin Edward Austen (1920–1995), and Albert William "Bob" Austen (1914–1999) — also played senior VFL football at Hawthorn.

== Football ==
Austen played five games for Hawthorn in the 1942 VFL season, with the highlight coming in his second game when he kicked four goals against St Kilda at Toorak Park.

== War Service ==
Austen served in the Royal Australian Air Force during World War II.

== Cricket ==
Austen’s only first-class cricket match was for South Australia against Victoria at the Adelaide Oval where he struggled, taking 0/77 with the ball and making two in both of his innings. He was dismissed twice by George Tribe, a man who also played in the VFL.
