= Mayor of Guildford =

The following were mayors of Guildford, Surrey, England:

- 1417-18: Richard Woking
- 1422-23: Richard Woking
- 1424-25: Richard Eton
- 1425-26: Richard Woking
- 1426-27: Geoffrey Mudge
- 1523: John Daborne
- 1531: John Daborne
- 1538–39: John Daborne
- 1550-51: William Hammond
- 1566: John Austen
- 1902-03: H. Nevill (Conservative)
- 2000-01: Sallie Thornberry
- 2001–02: Jennifer Eleri Powell
- 2002–03: Tony Phillips
- 2003–04: Gordon Alfred Bridger
- 2004–05: Keith Taylor
- 2005–06: Tamsy Baker
- 2006–07: Angela Gunning
- 2007–08: Mike Nevins
- 2008–09: Jennifer Jordan
- 2009–10: Pauline Searle
- 2010–11: Marsha Moseley
- 2011–12: Terence Patrick
- 2012–13: Jennifer Jordan
- 2013–14: Diana Lockyer-Nibbs
- 2014–15: David Elms
- 2015–16: Nikki Nelson-Smith
- 2016–17: Gordon Jackson
- 2017–18: Nigel Manning
- 2018–19: Mike Parsons
- 2019-21: Richard Billington
- 2021-22: Marsha Moseley
- 2022-23: Dennis Booth
- 2023-24: Masuk Miah
- 2024-25: Sallie Barker
- 2025-Present: Howard Smith
