= George Austen =

George Austen may refer to:

- George Austen (cleric) (1731–1805), Church of England clergyman and the father of Jane Austen
- George Austen (MP) (c. 1548–1621), MP for Guildford and Haslemere

== See also ==
- George Austin (gardener) (died 1789), gardener
- George Austin (priest) (1931–2019), British Anglican priest, broadcaster and author
