= Jack L. Austin =

Australian rules footballer

Jack Austin

Personal information
- Full name: Jack Austin
- Born: 15 October 1945 (age 81)
- Original team: Cheltenham
- Height: 188 cm (6 ft 2 in)
- Weight: 81 kg (179 lb)

Playing career^{1}
Years	Club	Games (Goals)
1966	St Kilda	6 (5)
1968	Fitzroy	3 (1)
Total		9 (6)
- ^{1} Playing statistics correct to the end of 1968.

Jack Austin (born 15 October 1945) is a former Australian rules footballer who played with St Kilda and Fitzroy in the Victorian Football League (VFL).
