= Abigail Austen =

Scottish journalist and former British Army officer

- Born: 8 December 1964 (age 61); Belfast, Northern Ireland
- Occupations: Reporter, journalist

Abigail Austen (born 8 December 1964) is a Northern Irish-born Scottish journalist and former British Army officer. She is the first officer in the British Army to begin gender reassignment while in the Army.

== Early life, education and early career ==
Austen was born in Belfast and grew up in Stonehaven, 15 miles (24 km) south of Aberdeen, in the North East of Scotland. Educated at Robert Gordon's College, Aberdeen, she had a generally unhappy and dislocated childhood, including a spell at boarding school, where she was abused. She was an outwardly popular and charismatic child but after suffering years of sexual abuse made worse by her gender dysphoria, she decided to join the British Army to camouflage her real personality.

In 1982, Austen joined the Royal Irish Rangers as an officer, serving in Northern Ireland and Germany. In 1984, eighteen months after joining up, she left the army and retrained as a video journalist and cameraman, before taking a position as a cameraman at Scottish Television in Glasgow that same year. Her military background saw her dispatched as a war correspondent to Gulf War 1, the civil wars in both Angola and Afghanistan, and the conflict in Bosnia, along with service with the United Nations. She then began working as both a director and series producer for both Scottish Television and Anglia Television. In 1997, she was promoted to editor-in-chief of L!VE TV, the television division of the Mirror Group. After management changes at the Mirror Group, she took up a senior management position at ITV's Granada Television. She has been nominated three times by the British Academy of Film and Television Arts.

== Army career ==
=== Rejoining the British Army ===
In 1995, Austen rejoined the Army as a reservist. As an over-age candidate, she first joined the Territorial Army, as a reservist and then the Regular Army as a regular reservist. She joined the Parachute Regiment in 2002, having already passed the selection process at age 35, and went on to attend All Arms Commando Course and Special Forces selection with 22 SAS, becoming a combat survival and a physical training instructor. She served with the Cheshire Regiment and The Highlanders in a variety of command appointments, as well as a number of staff appointments both in the UK and overseas, with a speciality in Information and Psychological Operations. In 2003, she commanded a company from The Parachute Regiment on operations in Iraq. She deployed on operations in Bosnia, Northern Ireland, the War in Afghanistan and the Iraq War. She returned to the United Kingdom in 2006 and spent a period recovering from two continuous years of operations before taking a position back in Afghanistan with NATO Forces, advising on specialist counter-narcotics operations, from where she was medivacked back to the UK with a serious infection following an IED incident.

=== Forced resignation, 2007 ===
In March 2007, Austen started a gender transition in accordance with her female gender identity.

Transgender individuals in the UK are protected under a number of legislative acts, including the Sex Discrimination Act Amendments (1999) and the Gender Recognition Act (2004), which make it illegal to treat a person differently on the grounds of gender alone, with the aim of protecting the rights of trans-people in the work-place. Although other people in the Royal Navy and Air Force have successfully transitioned in the service, as the first officer and first paratrooper, Austen's background caused considerable surprise to the Army, particularly in the light of constant media attention. At that time, the British military did not have regulations in place to support Austen's continued service with Airborne Forces. This led to a lengthy and public legal dispute.

The issue was eventually amicably resolved, and Austen resigned her commission. Austen's case led to Army policy on transgender soldiers being formalised for the first time which now allows soldiers to transition while in service. The Regimental Colonel of The Parachute Regiment wrote to Austen to thank her for her "years of loyal service as an Airborne Officer". She received a letter of apology from the Army in 2025.

== Later career ==
=== In media ===
Austen was the subject of a documentary on Channel 4 (UK) in March 2008 entitled Sex Change Soldier. This was repeated several times on UK television and sold to a number of other territories. The film continues to be shown around the world and formed the basis for a biographical film based on her life, produced by the Japanese TV company NHK.

In 2009, Austen was reported extensively in the press to have secured a £250,000 pay-out for "hurt feelings" from the MoD. She received several threats of violence from serving soldiers because of the attendant publicity of this case. The Mail Online and Evening Standard said in a retraction that Austen had "neither sought nor received £250k for hurt feelings." Austen insisted that they make a sizeable donation to service charities to compensate for the hurt done to the families of injured service personnel.

Following her experiences in Kandahar, she wrote the book Lord Roberts' Valet (ISBN 1517204836) and began a career strand as producer and presenter of her own television documentaries. In 2017, Austen's Channel 4 documentary, based on her experiences in Afghanistan, won a Creative Diversity Network award. 'Lord Roberts' Valet' is currently in development as a film with a major broadcaster. Austen was further nominated as 2017 International Presenter of the Year by the Association of International Broadcasters. Her memoir 'Sugar and Spice' was published in early 2023.

In 2017, she made media appearances countering US President Trump's direction on banning transgender individuals from service with the US military.

=== In advisory roles ===
She continued to undertake a number of training and advisory roles on gender issues, including with Lancashire Police, and supported the Parachute Regiment by fundraising for Airborne Charities.

After leaving military service, Austen served as a police officer with Strathclyde Police in Glasgow, setting the first Scottish legal precedents for transphobic crimes and as the UK lead on development of diversity awareness for the national police service. She is an instructor with the Army Cadet Force, mentoring troubled young people from her police ward.

In 2012, she returned to Afghanistan as a political advisor to US Forces in Southern Afghanistan. She served three years on back-to-back tours with the US 82nd Airborne, 3rd and 4th infantry divisions and was awarded a number of prestigious decorations for her work. She then moved to Ukraine, as deputy ambassador and senior diplomatic spokesperson for the European Union mission.

Austen was then appointed as senior advisor to the UK's Standing Joint Deployable Headquarters, creating policy for the 9-nation coalition Joint Expeditionary Force defending NATO's eastern flank. She has maintained a lecturing role to UK and US military staff colleges, specialising in conflict resolution and stabilisation.

== See also ==
- Transgender rights in the United Kingdom
- Roberta Cowell
