= Gun Buster =

British writer (1912–2001)

Gun Buster was the pseudonymous author of a series of novels about the British exploits in World War II. His works have been attributed to John Charles Austin and his son, Captain Richard Campion Austin (25 May 1912 – 13 September 2001), who was a captain in the Royal Artillery.

== Reviews and reprints ==
Writing during World War II his approach was one of mitigating depressing aspects of the war. Freda Barrymore, reviewing his book, Return via Dunkirk, in the Townsville Bulletin, said:

There certainly are passages of stark horror, but 'Gun Buster' does not make them too long. His is a book In which discomfort, tragedy and brutality Is stepped down, and the' spirit of the troope shines through the brighter.

His book Battle Dress consisted of a series of sketches relating to the British army in France and Dunkirk. The reviewer in the Launceston Examiner said:

"Battle Dress" is a worthy successor to "Return via Dunkirk" not only for factual interest but for human drama and it keeps Gun Buster in his high place among war writers.

In her review of Battle Dress, reviewer Eleanor Wood of the Montreal Gazette said that Gun Buster "lets the reader see that battle as it actually happened" and noted that "his real name is not given, but his books bear the unmistakeable touch of a good writer".

The Sydney Morning Herald reviewer stated:

Gun Buster has the rare knack of putting big thoughts into the mouths of ordinary men without losing the common man's idiom. While there is no attempt at connected narrative, only a collection of short stories, we still have the same grim battlefield realism, the same ironic juxtaposition of tragedy and humour, the same feeling that we are seeing tremendous history through the eyes of the humblest human participant.

In a 1946 review, W. J. Hurlow of the Ottawa Citizen lauded Gun Buster's books as "the work of a skilled writer gifted with powers of observation and description amounting almost to genius", and found the latest in the series, Zero Hours, "a series of incidents in the desert wars", to be "quite on a level with the author's depictions of battle scenes on other fronts".

Reviews of Gun Buster's fourth book, Grand Barage were also generally positive. The reviewer in The Mercury commented:

Much has been written about Malta's war ordeal, but I doubt if anyone has done the job so successfully as 'Gun Buster' in his fourth war book, "Grand Barrage." ... I consider [it], one of the best war books I have read.

Several Australian newspapers and magazines reprinted large segments of his book Return via Dunkirk and Battle Dress in weekly instalments.

== Bibliography ==
- Return via Dunkirk Hodder and Stoughton, London, 1940
- Battle Dress, Hodder and Stoughton, London, 1941
- Zero Hours, Hodder and Stoughton, London, 1942
- Grand Barrage, Hodder and Stoughton, London, 1944
- Victory Salvo, Hodder and Stoughton, London, 1946
