= Edward Austen =

English cleric and cricketer

Personal information
- Full name: Edward Thomas Austen
- Born: 28 January 1820; Chawton, Hampshire, England
- Died: 10 June 1908 (aged 88); Barfrestone, Kent, England

Domestic team information
- Years: Team
- 1844: MCC

Career statistics
Competition	First-class
Matches	1
Runs scored	3
Batting average	3.00
100s/50s	0/0
Top score	3*
Catches/stumpings	0/–
- Source: Cricinfo, 5 January 2014

Edward Thomas Austen (28 January 1820 – 10 June 1908) was an English cricketer. Austen's batting style is unknown.

The son of Sir Francis William Austen and Mary Gibson, Austen was born at Chawton, Hampshire. He was a nephew to the novelist Jane Austen. He studied at St John's College, Oxford, gaining his BA in 1846 and his MA in 1850. He played a single first-class cricket match for the Marylebone Cricket Club (MCC) against Oxford University in 1844 at the Magdalen Ground, Oxford. In a match which Oxford University won by 5 runs, Austen was run out for a duck in the MCC's first-innings, while he ended their second not out on 3.

Austen was later the rector at Barfrestone, Kent, a position he held from 1854 until his death on 10 June 1908.
