= Siobhan Austen =

Australian economist and researcher

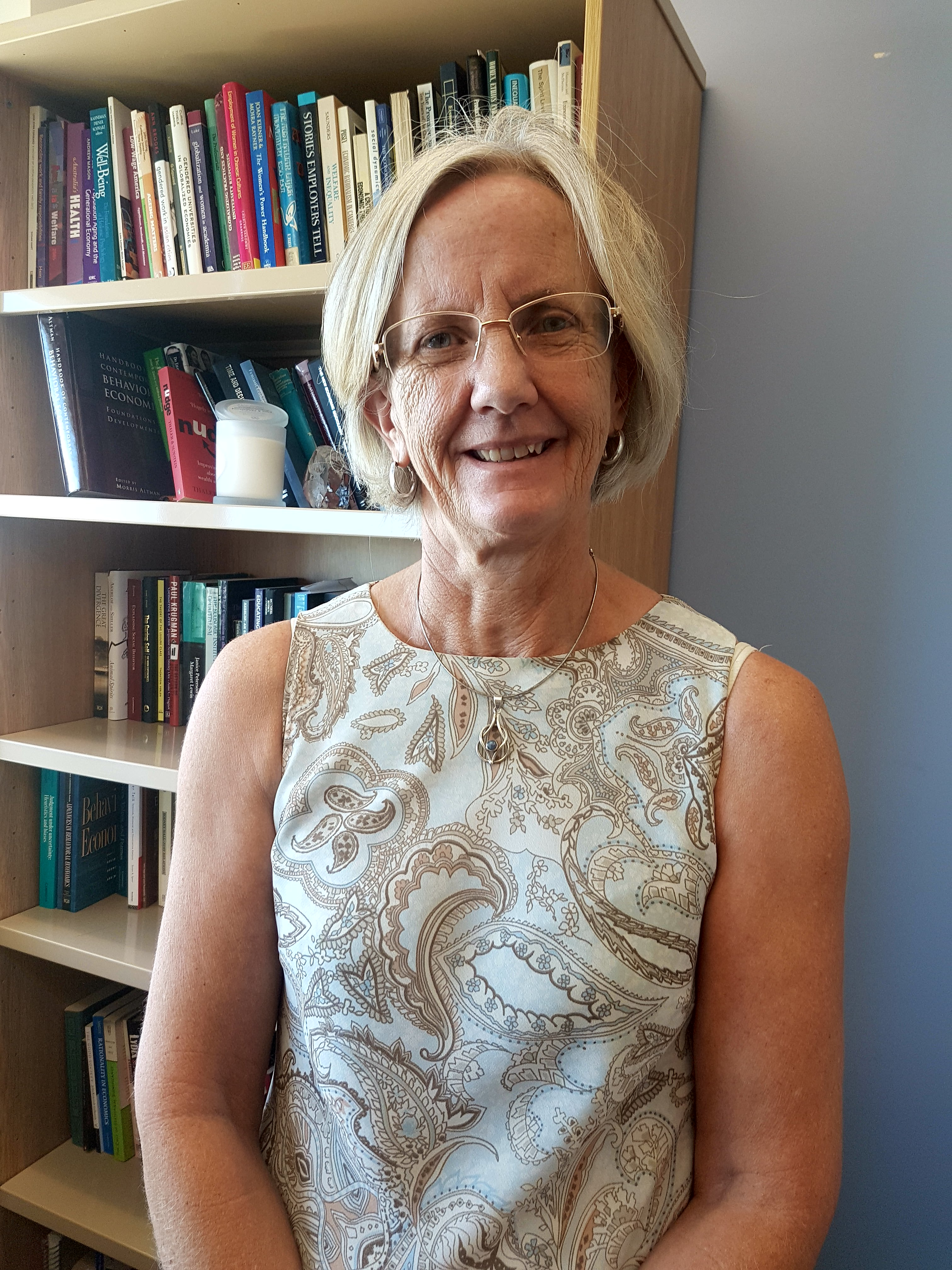
- Born: Melbourne, Australia
- Citizenship: Australia
- Spouse: Paul Austen

Academic background
- Education: Melbourne University (PhD 2001)

Academic work
- Discipline: Feminist Economics, Population ageing and Retirement, Labour economics
- Institutions: Curtin University
- Website: staffportal.curtin.edu.au/staff/profile/view/Siobhan.Austen; Information at IDEAS / RePEc

Siobhan Austen is an Australian economist and was a Professor of Economics and discipline lead of Economics at Curtin University until December 2020.

== Academic career ==
Austen obtained her Ph.D. in 2001 at the University of Melbourne. Her thesis, on the topic of the cultural aspects of labor markets, and was later published as a book by Edward Elgar Publishing. She has published more than 100 scholarly works.

In 1990, Austen was appointed at Curtin University, where she was promoted Professor in 2016. She has led projects awarded by the Australian Research Council as well as by the National Council of Vocational and Education Research. She has also received project-based funding from the Australian Housing and Urban Research Institute and AusAID.

Her research focuses on the gender aspect of population ageing, retirement incomes and labor force participation. More specifically, Austen's work highlights how "the circumstances of women are distinctive; how their contributions to economic performance are often overlooked; and how there is a need for sound understandings of women's circumstances before efficient and equitable policy on population ageing and other issues can be designed".

== Academic and public roles ==
Austen is co-creator and current director of the Women in Social Economic Research (WiSER) center at Curtin University. The WiSER group aims to foster quantitative and qualitative research on issues affecting women as well as to engage in current policy debates and industry linkages.

She plays an active role in policy debates about population ageing, retirement, and gender inequality and has contributed to Australian government inquiries on various economic issues.

Austen is a member of the Australian Bureau of Statistics Gender Statistics Advisory Group, the Federal Government's Gender Panel and the Work, Family and Life Policy Roundtable. She serves on the editorial board of Feminist Economics, the Journal of Economic Issues, and the Economic and Labour Relations Review.

== Selected publications ==
- Austen, Siobhan (28 July 2003). Culture and the Labour Market. Cheltenham: Edward Elgar Publishing. ISBN 978-1-84376-317-8.
- Austen, Siobhan (March 2002). "An international comparison of attitudes to inequality". International Journal of Social Economics. 29 (3): 218–237. doi:10.1108/03068290210417106. ISSN 0306-8293.
- Austen, Siobhan; Jefferson, Therese; Thein, Vicki (January 2003). "Gendered Social Indicators and Grounded Theory". Feminist Economics. 9 (1): 1–18. doi:10.1080/1354570032000063065. ISSN 1354-5701. S2CID 144941591.
- Austen, Siobhan; Ong, Rachel (February 2010). "The employment transitions of mid-life women: health and care effects". Ageing and Society. 30 (2): 207–227. doi:10.1017/S0144686X09990511. ISSN 0144-686X. S2CID 73399237.
- Austen, Siobhan; Jefferson, Therese (3 July 2019). "Crossing the Great Divide: Ostrom's Coproduction and the Economics of Aged Care". Feminist Economics. 25 (3): 48–69. doi:10.1080/13545701.2019.1566751. ISSN 1354-5701. S2CID 159184666.
- Austen, Siobhan; Jefferson, Therese; Lord, Linley (2019), "Gender segregation and labour market institutions", Handbook of the Politics of Labour, Work and Employment, Edward Elgar Publishing, pp. 357–374, doi:10.4337/9781784715694.00026, ISBN 978-1-78471-569-4, S2CID 211389534
- Austen, Siobhan; Sharp, Rhonda (2020), "Feminist Economics and Retirement Income and Savings Policy", in Sawer, Marian; Jenkins, Fiona; Downing, Karen (eds.), How Gender Can Transform the Social Sciences, Cham: Springer International Publishing, pp. 127–136, doi:10.1007/978-3-030-43236-2_13, ISBN 978-3-030-43235-5, S2CID 219502884
