= Cholmeley Austen-Leigh =

English cricketer, painter and art collector

Personal information
- Full name: Cholmeley Austen-Leigh
- Born: 26 September 1829; Tring, Hertfordshire, England
- Died: 30 September 1899 (aged 70); Kingston, Surrey, England
- Batting: Unknown
- Relatives: Arthur Austen-Leigh (brother); Charles Austen-Leigh (brother); Spencer Austen-Leigh (brother)

Domestic team information
- Years: Team
- 1862: Marylebone Cricket Club

Career statistics
| Competition | First-class |
|---|---|
| Matches | 1 |
| Runs scored | 22 |
| Batting average | 11.00 |
| 100s/50s | –/– |
| Top score | 14 |
| Catches/stumpings | –/– |
- Source: Cricinfo, 3 October 2020

Cholmeley Austen-Leigh (26 September 1829 – 30 September 1899) was an English first-class cricketer and barrister.

The son of The Reverend James Edward Austen-Leigh and his wife Emma, he was born at Tring in September 1829. His father was a nephew to the novelist Jane Austen. He was educated at Winchester College, before going up to Trinity College, Oxford, from where he graduated in 1851. His association with Trinity College continued after his graduation, with Austen-Leigh being a fellow of the college from 1852 to 1864. A student of Lincoln's Inn, he was called to the bar to practise as a barrister in April 1856.

He played first-class cricket for the Marylebone Cricket Club (MCC) against Sussex at Hove in 1862. Batting twice in the match, he was run out for 14 runs in the MCC first innings, while in their second innings he was dismissed for 8 runs by Arthur Chapman. Austen-Leigh was on the council of King's College London and was a partner in the printing company, Eyre & Spottiswoode. He married Melesina Mary Chenevix Trench in 1864, the daughter of Richard Chenevix Trench who was Archbishop of Dublin. Austen-Leigh died at Kingston in September 1899. His brothers, Arthur, Charles and Spencer were all first-class cricketers.
