= John Austin (American football) =

American football player and coach

Biographical details
- Education: Iowa (MS, 1992)

Playing career
- 1976–1979: South Dakota
- Position: Linebacker

Coaching career (HC unless noted)
- 1991–1998: Iowa (DL/RC)
- 1999–2003: South Dakota

Head coaching record
- Overall: 22–32

John Austin is an American former football player and coach. He served as the head football coach at the University of South Dakota from 1999 to 2003, compiling a record of 22–32. Austin is a former South Dakota Coyotes football player who served on the staff of Hayden Fry at the University of Iowa from 1991 to 1998.

== Head coaching record ==
Year	Team	Overall	Conference	Standing	Bowl/playoffs
South Dakota Coyotes (North Central Conference) (1999–2003)
1999	South Dakota	4–7	3–6	T–6th	
2000	South Dakota	8–3	6–3	T–3rd	
2001	South Dakota	2–8	1–7	T–8th	
2002	South Dakota	3–8	2–6	8th	
2003	South Dakota	5–6	2–5	6th	
South Dakota:		22–32	13–27		
Total:		22–32			
