= Austen Lake =

American journalist

Austen Lake (May 23, 1895 – June 9, 1964) was an American writer, war correspondent during World War II, and a sports and general columnist for the Boston Evening Transcript and the Boston Record-American-Sunday Advertiser, in a career spanning more than 40 years until his death in 1964. "Galley Slave" (1965) is an anthology of his columns including writings on his many visits to Ireland. He played professional football for Buffalo and Philadelphia and had a tryout to play catcher for the New York Yankees before going to Europe during World War I where he served with the French Ambulance Corps before the United States entered the war. When the United States entered the war, he became a member of the newly formed Tank Corps, earning five battle stars and becoming a life member of "The Little Red Tank Society", a group formed by America's first tankers. During the years of World War II, he was a war correspondent, covering the London Blitz, the Normandy invasion, and the liberation of Paris. After D-Day, he went on to cover the exploits of the 4th Armored Division. After the war, he covered the 1958 Lebanon crisis and wrote a popular series on Ireland. During his college years, he was a football star at Lafayette College, afterwards studying portraiture at the École des Beaux-Arts in Paris. Known throughout his life as "Duke", he died at the age of 69.
