= Geoff Austen =

Australian rules footballer

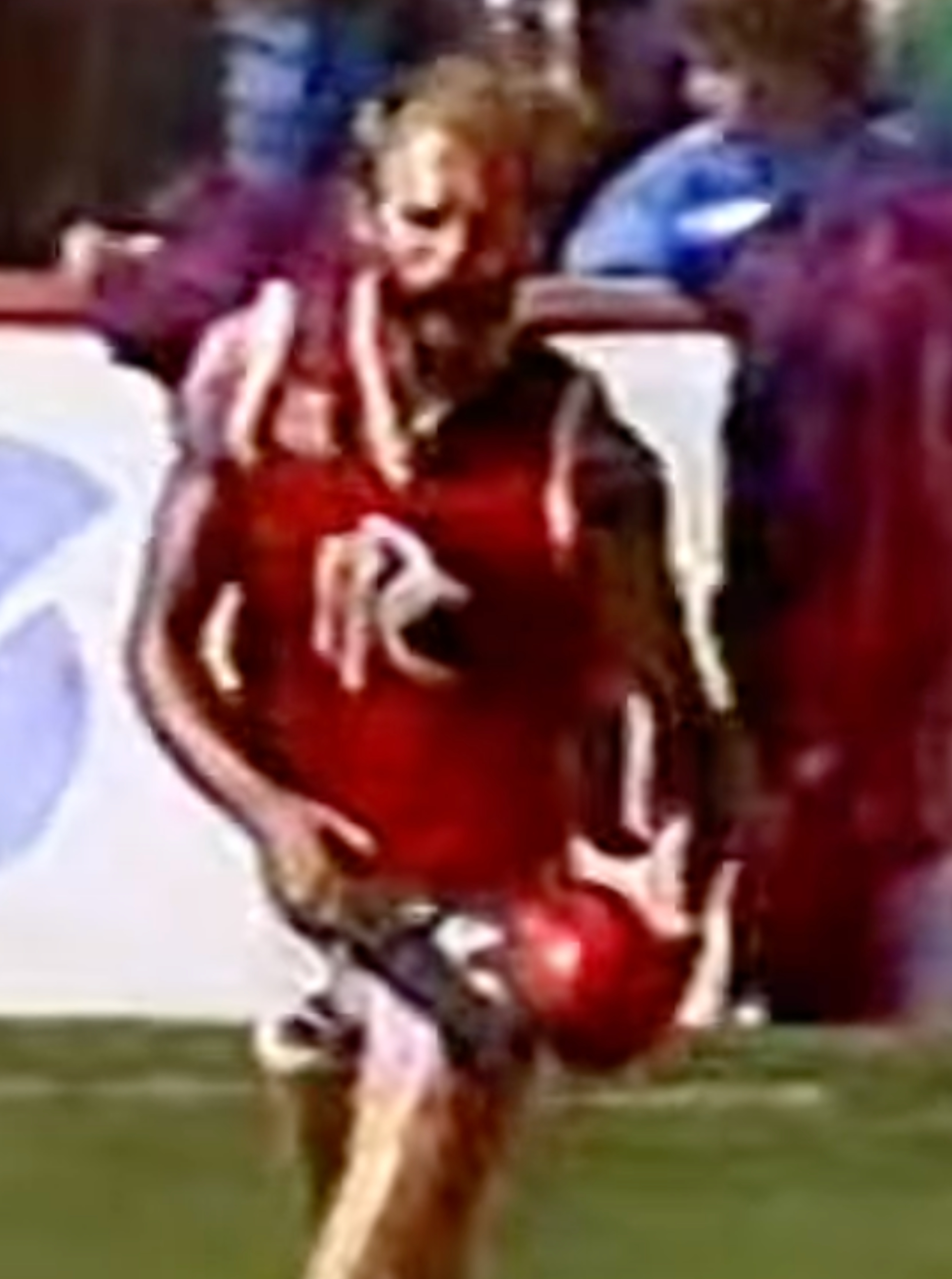
- Austen playing for Preston in 1982

Personal information
- Full name: Geoffrey Austen
- Nickname: Texas
- Born: 13 October 1953 (age 73); Ivanhoe, Victoria
- Original team: Macleod–Rosanna
- Height: 196 cm (6 ft 5 in)
- Weight: 105 kg (231 lb)
- Position: Ruckman

Playing career^{1}
Years	Club	Games (Goals)
1972–78	Fitzroy	85 (35)
1979, 1981	Collingwood	13 (3)
Total		98 (38)
- ^{1} Playing statistics correct to the end of 1981.

Career highlights
- Kicking 4 goals in the night premiership for Collingwood under coach Tom Hafey, 1979. Liston Trophy 1982. Playing for Preston. Won the inaugural Norm Goss for Best on Ground in the 1983 Premiership match for Preston. Runner up to Billy Swan (Father of Dane Swan) in Liston Trophy 1983. Winning Best and Fairest two consecutive seasons for Preston (1982 and 1983).

Geoffrey Austen (born 13 October 1953) is a former Australian rules footballer who played for Fitzroy and Collingwood in the Victorian Football League (VFL).

Austen, who was the son of league footballer Cecil, spent most of the 1970s in a struggling Fitzroy team. He got his chance to play at a stronger club in 1979 when he crossed to Collingwood and played a supportive role as Peter Moore rose to form and secured a Brownlow medal.

At Preston in 1982, Austen immediately made his mark by winning the J. J. Liston Trophy. The following season he played in their Victorian Football Association premiership and he won the Norm Goss Memorial Medal as best afield in the Grand Final.
