= John Austen (died 1572) =

English politician

John Austen (died 1572) was an English politician.

== Family ==
Austen married Joan Snelling and they had at least two sons including the MP, George Austen.

== Career ==
He was a member (MP) of the parliament of England for Guildford in 1563. He was Mayor of Guildford in 1566.
