= Patrick Austen =

British field hockey player (1933–2013)

Pat Austen
Personal information
- Born: 18 March 1933 Kingston upon Thames, England
- Died: 14 October 2013 (aged 80) Northampton, England

Sport
- Sport: Field hockey
Senior career
| Years | Team | Caps | Goals |
| 1953–1961 | Old Kingstonians | - | - |
| 1961–1965 | Purley | - | - |
National team
| Years | Team | Caps | Goals |
| – | Great Britain | | - |
| – | England | | - |

Patrick B. Austen (18 March 1933 – 14 October 2013) was a British field hockey player who competed at the 1960 Summer Olympics.

== Biography ==
Austen played club hockey for Old Kingstonians Hockey Club.

While at Old Kingstonians, Austen represented Great Britain in the field hockey tournament at the 1960 Olympic Games in Rome.

Austen later played for and captained Purley Hockey Club, while continuing to represent Surrey at county level.
