= Michael Austen =

South African cricketer (born 1964)

Personal information
- Full name: Michael Hubert Austen
- Born: 17 May 1964 (age 62); Cape Town, Cape Province, South Africa
- Batting: Right-handed
- Bowling: Left-arm medium

Domestic team information
- Years: Team
- 1982/83–1988/89: Western Province
- 1989/90–1991/92: Otago
- 1992/93–1995/96: Wellington
- 1996/97–1997/98: Otago
- FC debut: 5 March 1983 Western Province B v Border
- Last FC: 29 March 1997 Otago v Canterbury
- LA debut: 15 October 1983 Western Province B v Transvaal
- Last LA: 14 January 1998 Otago v Auckland

Career statistics
| Competition | First-class | List A |
|---|---|---|
| Matches | 66 | 60 |
| Runs scored | 3,619 | 1,380 |
| Batting average | 32.31 | 23.38 |
| 100s/50s | 6/16 | 0/9 |
| Top score | 202* | 95* |
| Balls bowled | 3,836 | 1,469 |
| Wickets | 55 | 39 |
| Bowling average | 32.96 | 26.87 |
| 5 wickets in innings | 1 | 0 |
| 10 wickets in match | 0 | 0 |
| Best bowling | 5/71 | 4/47 |
| Catches/stumpings | 48/– | 14/– |
- Source: CricInfo, 31 December 2021

Michael Hubert Austen (born 17 May 1964) is a South African-born cricketer who played for Western Province in South African domestic cricket between the 1982/83 and 1988/89 seasons and for Otago and Wellington between the 1989/90 and 1997/98 seasons. Austen worked as a doctor throughout his career in New Zealand.

Austen was born at Cape Town in South Africa in 1964. He was educated at Rondebosch Boys High School and worked professionally as a doctor. He made his senior debut for Western Province B in a SAB Bowl match against Border in March 1983. He played mainly for Western Province B in the Bowl competition, before making four appearances for Western Province in the 1987/88 Currie Cup. He played a single first-class match for a South African Universities side in 1987.

He moved to New Zealand to play for Otago at the start of the 1989/90 season, moving to Wellington for four seasons before returning to Otago to finish his first-class career. In total he played in 66 first-class cricket and 60 List A cricket matches, scoring almost 5,000 runs and taking 94 senior wickets.
