= Joe Austen =

British artist

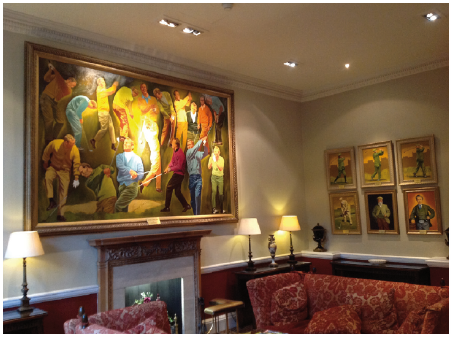
- Joe Austen's action shot painting of Arnold Palmer, within The Gallery of Champions
- Born: Joseph Gerard "Joe" Austen; St Andrews, Scotland
- Known for: British artist, writer, producer and director
- Notable work: Painting collections: the Macdonald Collection, the Historical Collection, the Portraits of the Royal Captains and the Tony Jacklin Ryder Cup Collection
- Style: Sports portraits

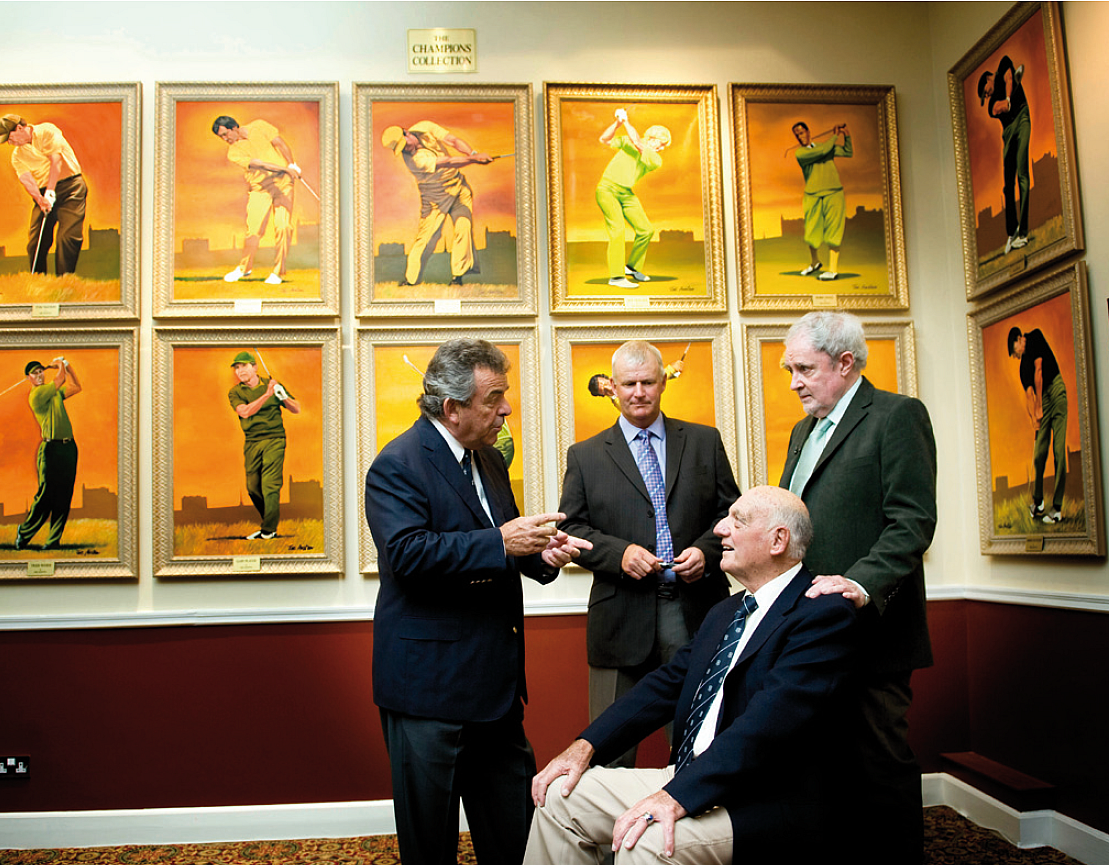
Tony Jacklin CBE, Sandy Lyle MBE & Joe Austen, with Roberto De Vicenzo, at The Gallery of Champions, in St Andrews.

Joseph Gerard "Joe" Austen is a British artist, writer, producer and director from St Andrews, Scotland. Since 1976, a collection of his paintings has been on display in The Gallery of Champions within the Rusacks Hotel, St Andrews, Scotland. The Joe Austen gallery can be seen in full as an interactive virtual tour.

For the 150th The Open Championship in St. Andrews in 2010, six of golf's greatest champions were made Honorees of The Gallery of Champions when Austen painted their portraits. Those portraits are now a permanent part of the gallery. The honorees included Tony Jacklin, Arnold Palmer, Gary Player, Sandy Lyle and Roberto De Vicenzo. De Vicenzo attended the opening of the gallery with Jacklin and Lyle, and commented on the day, "Joe Austen - your paintings will get you in to Heaven."

In the Rusacks Hotel, Austen's painting collections are grouped into four separate categories; the Macdonald Collection, the Historical Collection, the Portraits of the Royal Captains and the most recently launched Tony Jacklin Ryder Cup Collection. The collections have been described as "portraits of golfing legends through the centuries", and the gallery was selected as the central location for the inaugural St Andrews Golf Festival in 2012 to showcase the strong links between St Andrews and golf.

== Career ==
=== Golf portraits ===
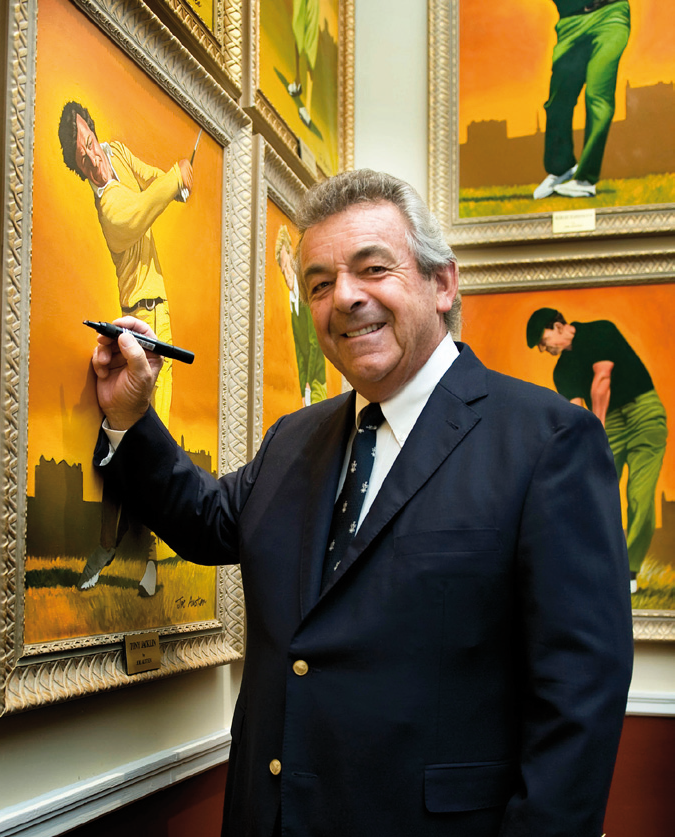
Tony Jacklin at The Gallery of Champions signing Austen's painting

Tony Jacklin and Austen collaborated in 2014 to create The Tony Jacklin Ryder Cup Collection; a new series of hand-painted oil portraits and limited edition prints of those portraits, which Austen has said will "commemorate The Ryder Cup at Gleneagles, Scotland in 2014"

Jacklin, a "golfing icon" according to the European Tour selected what he believed to be the 20 greatest players in the history of the Ryder Cup, and Austen painted their portraits. Limited edition prints of The Tony Jacklin Ryder Cup Collection have been available online since the Ryder Cup 2014.

In 2011, Austen's paintings were selected for the online launch of St Andrews Golf Art, a website which claims to offer "a unique selection of golf art from internationally-acclaimed contemporary artists, sculptors and illustrators"

In 2010, Austen undertook a similar venture to The Tony Jacklin Ryder Cup Collection, in collaboration with Rolex. To commemorate the 150th year of The Open Championship, Rolex commissioned Austen to paint a composite portrait of Jack Nicklaus, Arnold Palmer and Gary Player, from which 250 Limited Edition Prints were produced. All of the prints were signed by Palmer, Player and Austen, and presented by Rolex as gifts to valued clients.

Austen's golf portraits are also exhibited in private and public collections throughout the world, including Palmer's Bay Hills Golf Club, and The Concession Golf Club in Florida, co-designed by Jacklin and Nicklaus. Within The Concession Golf Club, Austen's paintings of golfing champions and the spirit of the Ryder Cup, are displayed within the main hallways and are collectively titled The Concession Collection.

==== Portraits within the Gallery of Champions ====
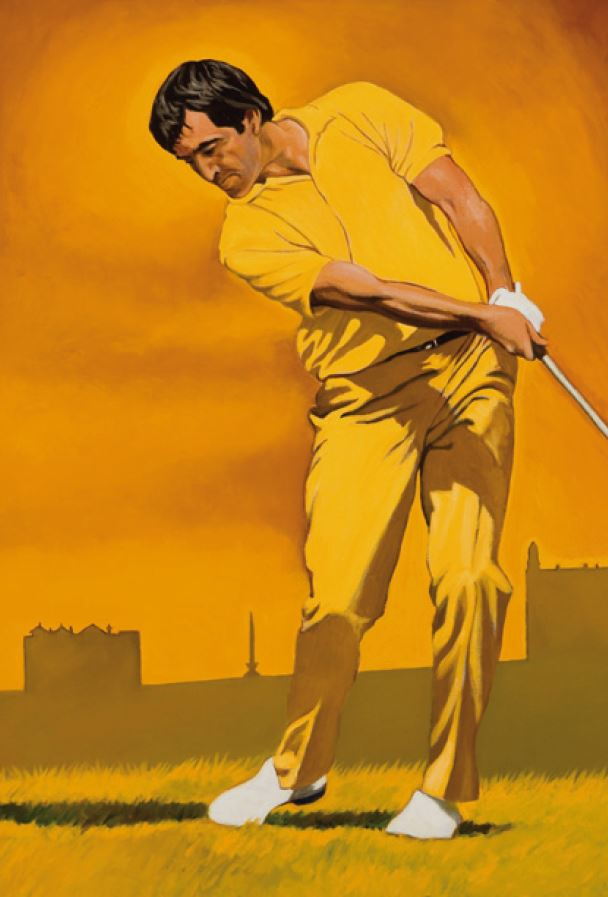
Austen's painting of Seve Ballesteros, within The Gallery of Champions.

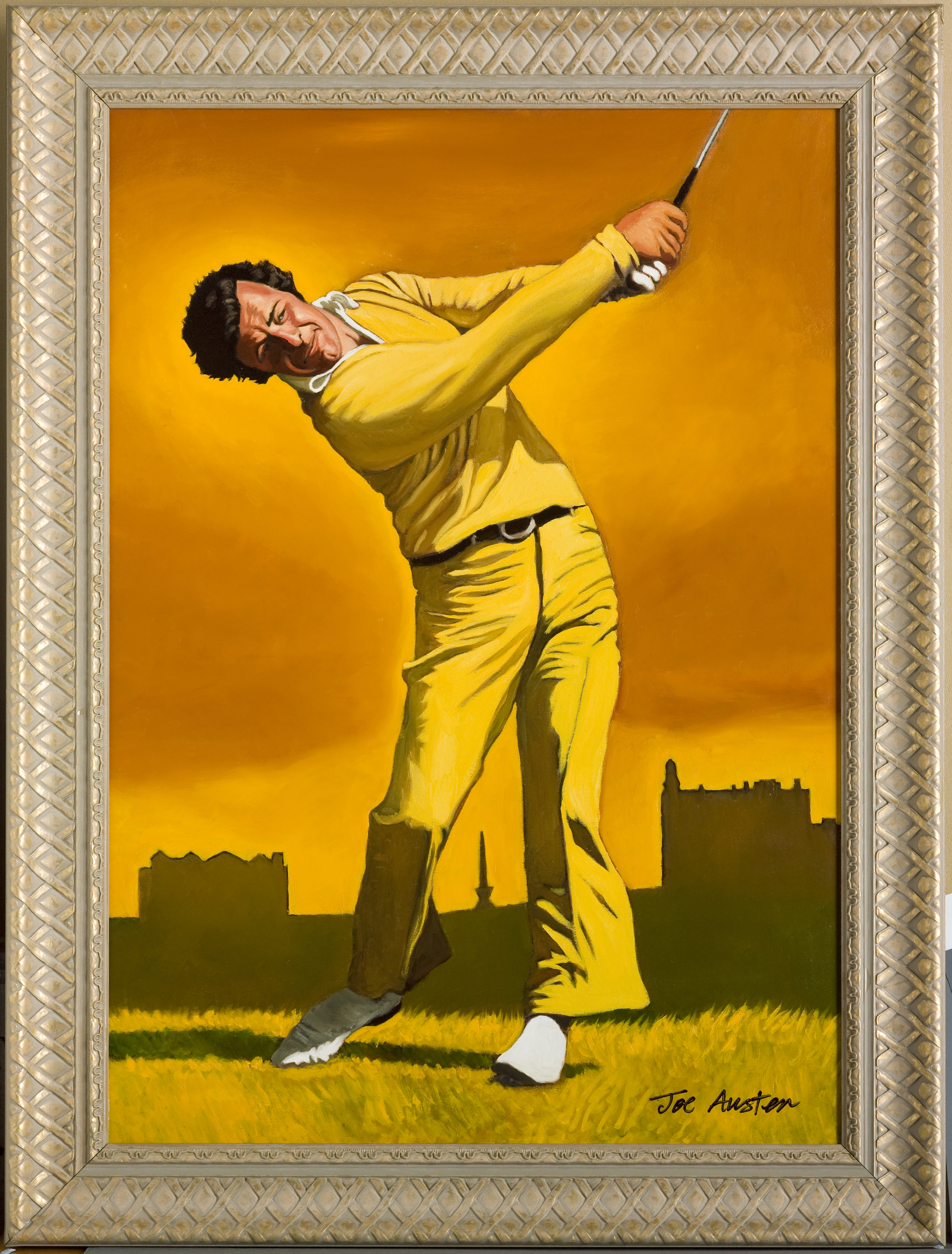
Austen's painting of Tony Jacklin in The Gallery of Champions

The majority of Austen's paintings are on display in the Gallery of Champions, and the collections include the following paintings.

- Allan Robertson
- Arnold Palmer
- Ben Hogan
- Bobby Jones
- Gary Player
- Gene Sarazen
- Harry Vardon
- Henry Cotton
- Jack Nicklaus
- James Braid
- Johnny Miller
- John Henry Taylor
- Lee Trevino
- Old Tom Morris
- Peter Thomson
- Sam Snead
- Sandy Lyle
- Seve Ballesteros
- Tiger Woods
- Tom Watson
- Tom Weiskopf
- Tony Jacklin
- Walter Hagen
- Willie Auchterlonie
- Young Tom Morris

=== Children's television and book creations ===
==== The Magic House ====
Austen created, wrote and illustrated 24 books in the bestselling The Magic House series, which were published in 1985 by Richard Drew Publishing. He went on to create and develop The Magic House television series for Scottish Television. It ran for three seasons from 1994 to 1996 and Austen was involved in every aspect of its creation, acting as writer, illustrator, designer and on-screen storyteller and presenter.

Subsequently, The Magic House was developed into a puppet television series for the ITV Network. As writer, designer and associate producer of The Magic House television series, Austen wrote 55 scripts for three network series and designed the puppets, sets and cell-animated title sequences.

He then created The Magic Bank Club for TSB Bank, based on The Magic House, and aimed at promoting bank accounts for children.

Austen went on to create, write, illustrate and present Joe and Co, a Magic House spin-off, as a BBC television series. Following this, he was a writer, illustrator and co-presenter on the BBC Untied Shoelaces television series.

After The Magic House book series had been out of print for a number of years, a Facebook group was created by fans in June 2010, called "Bring back the Magic House books (Joe Austen)" in an effort to have them reprinted, highlighting the dedication of his readers. In July 2014, the Facebook page had gathered 261 fans.

==== Story Store ====
The Story Store is a concept for television and publishing developed by Austen. He went on to establish a new stop-frame model animation studio in central London in order to produce The Story Store television series for Carlton Television for the ITV Network in 1995. Austen developed the show and designed the puppets. He also directed the voice recordings of Alan Bennett, Rory Bremner and Stephen Fry. He went on to write and design four Story Store illustrated books.

==== Storyland Ltd. ====
In May 2001 Austen established Storyland Ltd., a family entertainment company based in Dundee, with Richard Attenborough as company president.

In 2001, the company bought back ownership of more than 60 programmes and two dozen books created by Austen for various broadcasters and publishers. These properties include 13 episodes of The Story Store, previously owned and broadcast by Carlton, and 55 episodes of The Magic House, which was developed for Scottish Television. Austen said at the time that Storyland had paid a six-figure sum to bring these and other properties back into its ownership. They formed the core of a wide range of family entertainment that Storyland intended to market through television, satellite, cable, publishing and new media of the time, such as broadband.

During his time with Storyland, Austen produced a new Story Store Christmas Special for the ITV network in 2001, entitled Music & Moonlight, which was broadcast on New Year's Day and featured the impressionist Rory Bremner as the voice behind more than half-a-dozen characters. Storyland was subsequently publicly listed and became Storyland PLC, before being dissolved in March 2014.
