= George Austen (MP) =

English Member of Parliament (died 1621)

George Austen (c. 1548 – 1621), of Guildford and Shalford, Surrey, was an English politician.

== Family ==
Austen was the son of MP, John Austen, MP for Guildford in 1563. He made three marriages, with issue from all three. Two of his sons were University men, one at Oxford and one at Cambridge.

== Career ==
He was a Member (MP) of the Parliament of England for Haslemere in 1597 and for Guildford in 1604.
