= John Daborne =

Alderman John Daborne
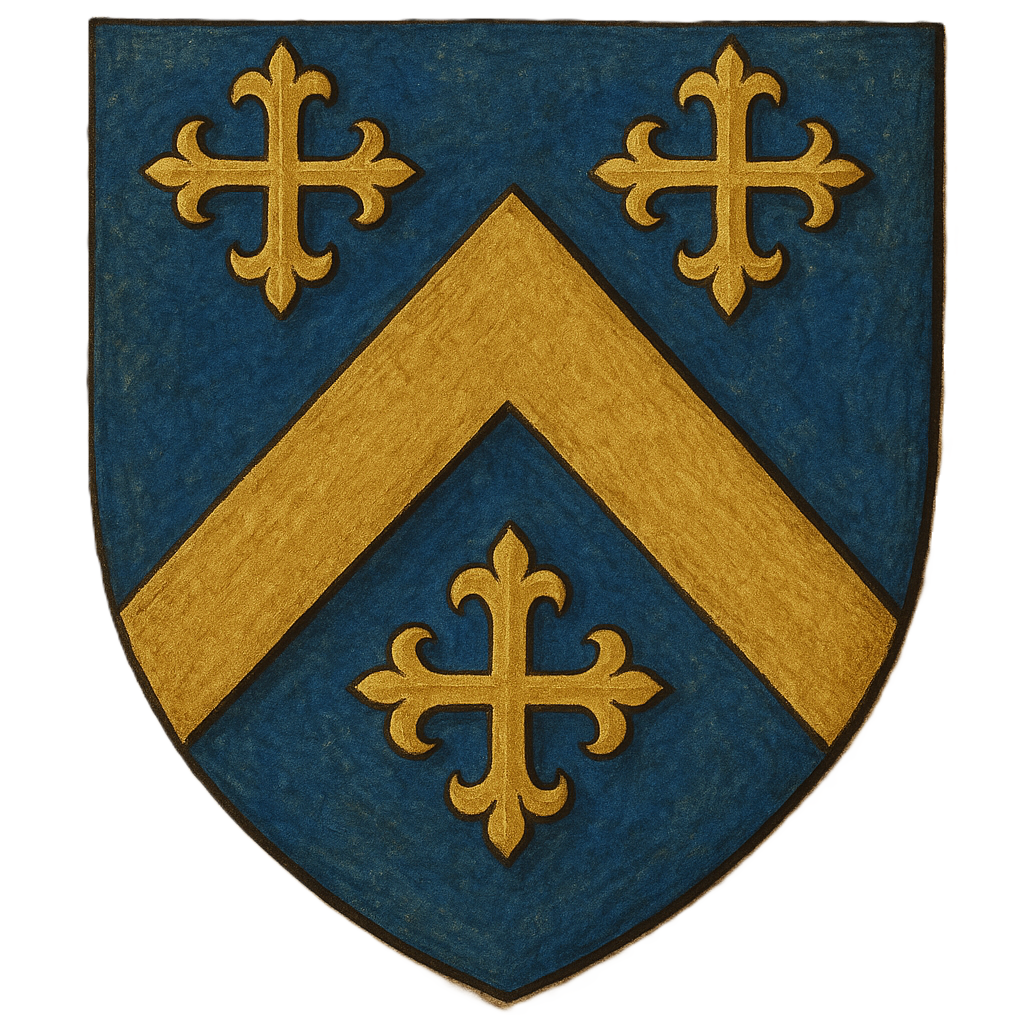

Mayor of Guildford
- Incumbent
- Assumed office 1513, 1523, 1538

Personal details
- Born: c. 1500
- Died: 1548
- Spouse: Unknown
- Children: Maud (Matilda), Joane, George
- Relatives: Mary Morris, Countess of Dover (granddaughter)
- Occupation: Merchant; civic officer
- Known for: Mayor of Guildford (three terms); Keeper of Guildford Castle gardens; Grandson Charles Cockayne

John Daborne (c.1500 – 1 September 1548) was an English merchant, clothier, and Mayor of Guildford, Surrey. He served three times as Mayor of Guildford in 1523, 1531, and 1538. Daborne also served as an alderman of the town. In 1544, following the relocation of Guildford’s gaol, he was appointed keeper of the castle gardens and managed the grounds of Guildford Castle. He became the guardian of Guildford Castle garden after the jail that had been in the castle moved to Southwark. His family were involved with the castle for the rest of the 16th century and they are thought to have added the brick windows and fireplaces still seen in the ruins of the castle.

== Arms ==
Daborne is a descendent of the d'Abernon family, an influential Anglo-Norman noble family in England, known for holding the manor of Stoke D'Abernon. The original arms of D'Abernon were as Azure, a chevron Or.

The arms of the Daborne family were recorded as: Azure, a chevron between three crosses flory Or.

== Family ==
He married his wife Elizabeth about 1519. He was buried on 1 Sept 1548 at St Mary's, Guildford.

John Daborne married Elizabeth and had several children whose marriages connected the family into London’s guild and civic elite:

Maud (Matilda) Daborne, first married John Barlow, an Ironmonger, but shortly after marriage he died. Maude remarried six months later to Richard Morris (d. 1592), merchant of London, Master of Ironmongers' Company in 1585, and 1588. Their daughter Mary Morris married Sir William Cockayne, Lord Mayor of London in 1619, and later Henry Carey, 1st Earl of Dover, becoming Countess of Dover.

Joane Daborne, married Sir William Allen, alderman of London and Lord Mayor of London (1571).

George Daborne was admitted a Freeman of the City, and became a member of the Ironmongers’ Company in 1563–64.
