= Ernest Austen (cricketer) =

Australian cricketer (1900–1983)

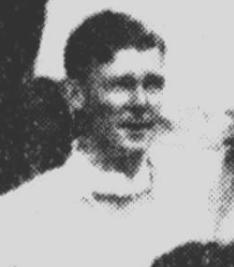

Personal information
- Born: 23 September 1900; Melbourne, Australia
- Died: 21 June 1983 (aged 82); Melbourne, Australia

Domestic team information
- Years: Team
- 1925-1930: Victoria
- Source: Cricinfo, 21 November 2015

Ernest Austen (23 September 1900 – 21 June 1983) was an Australian cricketer. He played nine first-class cricket matches for Victoria between 1925 and 1930.

== See also ==
- List of Victoria first-class cricketers
