= John Mather Austin =

Universalist clergyman in New York, USA

John Mather Austin (26 September 1805 – 20 December 1880) was a Universalist clergyman in New York State, and editor of the Universalist weekly newspaper the Christian Ambassador. He was a close associate of William H. Seward in prison reform and abolition efforts.

== External list ==
- Golden Steps to Respectability, Usefulness and Happiness at Project Gutenberg
