= Spencer Austen-Leigh =

English cricketer

Personal information
- Full name: Spencer Austen-Leigh
- Born: 2 February 1834; Speen, Berkshire, England
- Died: 9 December 1913 (aged 79); Firle, Sussex, England
- Batting: Right-handed
- Bowling: Unknown
- Relatives: Arthur Austen-Leigh (brother); Cholmeley Austen-Leigh (brother); Charles Austen-Leigh (brother)

Domestic team information
- Years: Team
- 1862–1866: Sussex
- 1858: Marylebone Cricket Club

Career statistics
Competition	First-class
Matches	13
Runs scored	209
Batting average	11.00
100s/50s	–/–
Top score	42
Balls bowled	40
Wickets	1
Bowling average	14.00
5 wickets in innings	–
10 wickets in match	–
Best bowling	1/9
Catches/stumpings	1/–
- Source: Cricinfo, 23 June 2012

Spencer Austen-Leigh (17 February 1834 – 9 December 1913) was an English cricketer. Austen-Leigh was a right-handed batsman, although his bowling style is not known. He was born at Speen, Berkshire, and was educated at Harrow School. His name changed from Spencer Austen to Spencer Austen-Leigh in 1837. He was the great-nephew of the author Jane Austen.

Austen-Leigh made his first-class debut for the Gentlemen of England against the Gentlemen of Sussex and Kent at Lord's in 1857. The following season he made a single first-class appearance for the Marylebone Cricket Club against Oxford University at the Magdalen Ground, Oxford. Two years later, he made a first-class appearance for the Gentlemen of the Marylebone Cricket Club against the Gentlemen of Kent at the St Lawrence Ground. In 1862, Austen-Leigh made his debut for Sussex against Kent at the Royal Brunswick Ground. He made nine further first-class appearances for Sussex, the last of which came against the Marylebone Cricket Club in 1866. In his ten first-class matches for the county, he scored 155 runs at an average of 11.07, with a high score of 42.

He died at Firle, Sussex, on 9 December 1913. His brothers, Arthur, Cholmeley and Charles, all played first-class cricket. Another brother, Augustus, was a Provost of King's College, Cambridge.
