= Charles Austen-Leigh =

English cricketer, painter and art collector

Personal information
- Full name: Charles Edward Austen-Leigh
- Born: 30 June 1832; Tring, Hertfordshire, England
- Died: 17 November 1924 (aged 92); Alfriston, Sussex, England
- Batting: Unknown
- Bowling: Unknown
- Relatives: Arthur Austen-Leigh (brother); Cholmeley Austen-Leigh (brother); Spencer Austen-Leigh (brother)

Domestic team information
- Years: Team
- 1862–1863: Marylebone Cricket Club

Career statistics
| Competition | First-class |
|---|---|
| Matches | 2 |
| Runs scored | 16 |
| Batting average | 4.00 |
| 100s/50s | –/– |
| Top score | 10 |
| Balls bowled | 38 |
| Wickets | 3 |
| Bowling average | 4.00 |
| 5 wickets in innings | – |
| 10 wickets in match | – |
| Best bowling | 2/6 |
| Catches/stumpings | 1/– |
- Source: Cricinfo, 25 September 2020

Charles Edward Austen-Leigh (30 June 1832 – 17 November 1924) was an English first-class cricketer and Principal Clerk of Committees in the House of Commons.

The son of The Reverend James Edward Austen-Leigh and his wife Emma, he was born at Tring in June 1832. His father was a nephew to the novelist Jane Austen. He was educated firstly at Winchester College, before transferring to Harrow School which he attended until 1851. From Harrow he went up to Balliol College, Oxford. He played first-class cricket in 1861 and 1862, making two appearances for the Marylebone Cricket Club against Sussex and Middlesex, scoring 16 runs and taking 3 wickets. Austen-Leigh later served as Principal Clerk of Committees in the House of Commons from 1892 until his retirement in 1897. He died, aged 92, at Alfriston in November 1924. His brothers, Arthur, Cholmeley and Spencer were all first-class cricketers.
