= Bob Austen =

Australian rules footballer

Personal information
- Full name: Albert William Austen
- Born: 24 May 1914; Burnley, Victoria
- Died: 6 July 1999 (aged 85)
- Original team: Camberwell
- Height: 180 cm (5 ft 11 in)
- Weight: 79 kg (174 lb)

Playing career^{1}
| Years | Club | Games (Goals) |
| 1942 | Hawthorn | 6 (1) |
- ^{1} Playing statistics correct to the end of 1942.

Albert William 'Bob' Austen (24 May 1914 – 6 July 1999) was an Australian rules footballer who played with Hawthorn in the Victorian Football League (VFL).

After six games with Hawthorn in 1942, he enlisted and served in both in the Australian Army and the Royal Australian Air Force during World War II.
