= Arthur Austen-Leigh =

English Anglican vicar, cricketer, and footballer

Personal information
- Full name: Arthur Henry Austen-Leigh
- Born: 28 February 1826; Speen, Berkshire, England
- Died: 29 July 1917 (aged 91); Reading, Berkshire, England
- Batting: Unknown
- Relatives: Spencer Austen-Leigh (brother); Cholmeley Austen-Leigh (brother); Charles Austen-Leigh (brother); Lois Austen-Leigh (daughter)

Career statistics
Competition	First-class
Matches	1
Runs scored	34
Batting average	34.00
100s/50s	–/–
Top score	34
Balls bowled	–
Wickets	–
Bowling average	–
5 wickets in innings	–
10 wickets in match	–
Best bowling	–
Catches/stumpings	–/–
- Source: CricketArchive, 26 September 2018

Arthur Henry Austen-Leigh (28 February 1836 – 29 July 1917) was an English Anglican vicar, cricketer and footballer.

== Life ==
Austen-Leigh was born at Speen, Berkshire in February 1836, to Emma Smith and her husband, the vicar, James Edward Austen-Leigh, who was a nephew to the novelist Jane Austen. He was educated at both Radley College and Cheltenham College, before studying law and theology at Balliol College, Oxford.

While studying at Balliol in 1857, Austen-Leigh played first-class cricket for the Gentlemen of England against the Gentlemen of Kent and Sussex at Lord's. He batted once in the match. Opening the batting, he made 34 runs, before being dismissed bowled by Edward Tredcroft.

He graduated from Balliol with an MA, becoming a curate in his fathers parish. A keen sportsman, Austen-Leigh played football for Maidenhead from 1871 to 1874, including playing in the inaugural FA Cup. He later served as the rector for Winterbourne, Gloucestershire, from 1875 to 1890, and from 1890 to 1911 he served as the vicar for Wargrave, Berkshire. He died at Reading on 29 July 1917.

== Family ==
Austen-Leigh was married to Mary Violet Hall Say, the daughter of Sir Richard Hall-Say. The couple had four daughters and three sons:

1. Mary Dorothy (1878–1972)
2. Violet Winifred (1879–1973)
3. Honor Caroline (1881–1970)
4. James Edward (1882–1909)
5. Lois Emma (1883–1968)
6. Lionel Arthur (1886–1960)
7. Arthur Alexander (1890–1918)
