= Denzil Onslow of Pyrford =

British Whig politician

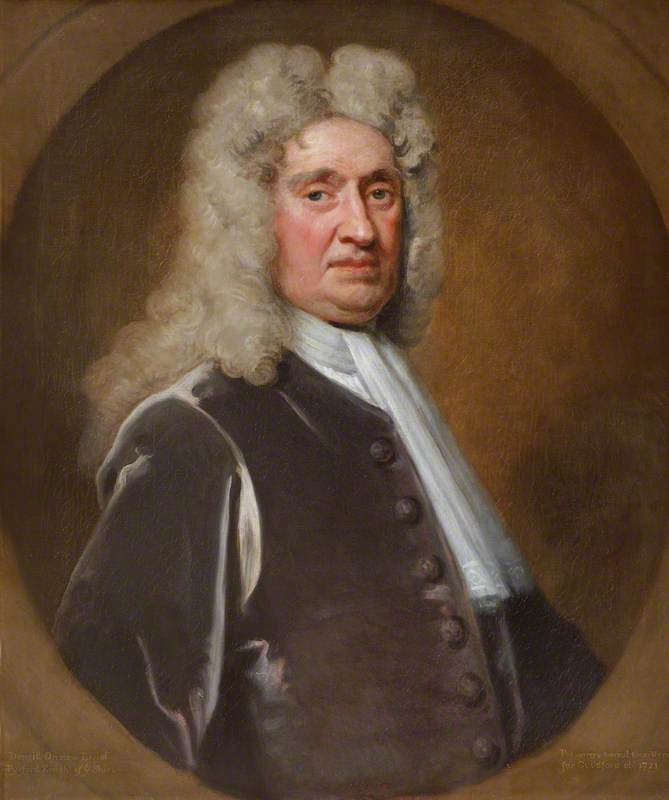
Denzil Onslow of Pyrford in 1719

Denzil Onslow of Pyrford (c. 1642 – 27 June 1721) was a British Whig politician who sat in the English and British House of Commons between 1679 and 1721. Through advantageous marriages, he obtained a country estate and became prominent in Surrey politics of the Hanoverian era, although his great nephew Arthur Onslow, as Speaker, judged that Denzil knew "no more of the business [of the House of Commons] than one who had been of the standing of a session".

== Early career and marriage ==
As the sixth son of the Parliamentarian Sir Richard Onslow, he inherited little from his father. He was named after Denzil Holles, who stood as his godfather. Apprenticed in December 1661 to William Peake, of London, he soon turned elsewhere to seek his fortune. His elder brother Arthur had married Mary, the daughter of Sir Thomas Foote, 1st Baronet, a wealthy London grocer. Denzil married Mary's sister Sarah Lewis, the widow of Sir John Lewis, 1st Baronet. The money she brought to the match allowed him to buy the manor of Pyrford from Robert Parkhurst (the fourth of a line of the same name) which comprised approximately 1 square mile (2.6 km^{2}) in 1677, a mixed quality agricultural estate, with patches of sandy soil and manor house in Surrey; and also the manor of Wisley.

== Rise in Surrey ==
Onslow worked assiduously to improve his estate, and his situation improved again when Foote died in 1688; his estate was divided between Mary and Sarah, and Denzil's income rose to £2,000 a year. As his fortunes and social status rose, Onslow began to cultivate political ambitions. He found his opportunity in the Exclusion crisis in 1679 which was an attempt before the successful attempt to dethrone James II of England. Standing as a pro-Exclusion Whig, he was returned as Member of Parliament for the borough of Haslemere. (His brother Arthur was simultaneously returned as MP for the whole county which stretched into today's London, while Arthur's son Richard was returned for the borough of Guildford.) However, a double return was made for the borough, and Denzil was not declared the member until 11 November 1680, triumphing over his rival James Gresham.

Onslow lost his seat in 1681. Around 1686, he was appointed outranger of Windsor Forest, widening the Onslow family's powers over the west of Surrey and which paid Onslow £600 per year. In 1689, in the aftermath of the Glorious Revolution, he recovered his seat at Haslemere. Onslow's political activity is not readily traced; his nephew Foot Onslow seems to have taken a greater part in Parliamentary affairs. He supported Sacheverell's clause excluding from office members of municipal corporations that had surrendered their charters to James II; however, during 1693 and 1694, some observers considered him an adherent of the Court party.

In 1695, he stood alongside his nephew Sir Richard to become a knight of the shire (MP) for Surrey, narrowly eking out a victory over Edward Harvey (which Harvey unsuccessfully appealed to the committee of privileges). Thereafter his votes stamped him as a solid Whig, although his attendance in Parliament was desultory. At the next election in 1698, the Onslow interest was suffering from a scandal: his nephew Foot's electioneering at Guildford after which the family did not dare attempt to monopolize the two seats for Surrey as a whole. He did not return to Parliament until February 1701 in a by-election for Guildford, where Foot had resigned to become an excise officer.

== Difficult years ==
Safely established at Guildford, Onslow remained a dependable, if not assiduous, supporter of Whig interests, and was rewarded in 1706 with the post of commissioner of victualling, worth £400 a year. The income was of some importance to him, as he had been financially impaired by the death of his wife Sarah, who revenged herself for his extramarital affairs by leaving most of her estate to relatives from her first marriage. During the next several years, Onslow showed considerable interest in promoting the affairs of Surrey in Parliament. However, his new-found support for the impeachment of Henry Sacheverell enhanced the support for Tories who garnered an opposition. Onslow was not unseated in the 1710 election but he faced a difficult contest and seems to have suffered from ill-health. Despite losing his rangership and commissionership in 1711, he continued to follow his party, voting to uphold the principle of "No peace without Spain" (to end the War of the Spanish Succession) in December. His nephew Sir Richard had lost election for Surrey in 1710 but was instead supporter-funded into the House through the rotten borough of St Mawes; in the 1713 election, Denzil allowed Sir Richard to contest Guildford, which he won.

== Return to Parliament ==
Sir Richard in the same year won the Surrey poll as well, and chose to sit for the county. Denzil returned to Parliament in the resulting by-election in 1714. Although his rival John Walter contested the result before the Committee for Privileges, Onslow was accepted as victor after a long debate. Queen Anne's early Tory Party heyday was over. The Whigs were re-ascendant under George I and as such Onslow regained the lucrative commissionership of the victualling office.

In 1717, Richard (who had been made a baron in 1716) died and was succeeded by his son Thomas triggering a by-election for Surrey. To maintain his family's interest there, Denzil arranged to be reappointed Out-Ranger of Windsor Forest, an office held by Thomas since 1715. As an office of profit under the Crown, this enabled him to vacate his seat at Guildford and contest Surrey, where he was victorious. This is thought to be the second instance where bestowal of an office of profit under the Crown allowed a Member of Parliament to resign his seat.

Onslow died four years later, in 1721. His marriage to Sarah Lewis had been childless, as had a second to the widow Jane Yard, sister of John Weston. Dying without issue, he left his estate to the children of his nephew Richard Onslow, 1st Baron Onslow; of no consequence as he had no children, Denzil had been included in the special remainder for the barony of Onslow.

Parliament of England
Preceded by Sir William More; James Gresham	Member of Parliament for Haslemere; 1679–1681; With: Francis Dorrington	Succeeded by Sir William More; Sir George Woodroffe
Preceded by Sir George Woodroffe; George Vernon	Member of Parliament for Haslemere; 1689–1695; With: White Tichborne 1689–1690; George Rodney Brydges 1690–1695	Succeeded by George Rodney Brydges; George Woodroffe
Preceded by Sir Richard Onslow; Sir Francis Vincent	Member of Parliament for Surrey; 1695–1698; With: Sir Richard Onslow	Succeeded by Sir Richard Onslow; John Weston
Preceded by Foot Onslow; Morgan Randyll	Member of Parliament for Guildford; 1701–1707; With: Morgan Randyll 1701–1705; Robert Wroth 1705–1707	Succeeded by Parliament of Great Britain
Parliament of Great Britain
Preceded by Parliament of England	Member of Parliament for Guildford; 1707–1713; With: Robert Wroth 1707–1708, 1710–1711; Morgan Randyll 1708–1710, 1711–1713	Succeeded by Morgan Randyll; Sir Richard Onslow
Preceded by Morgan Randyll; Sir Richard Onslow	Member of Parliament for Guildford; 1714–1717; With: Morgan Randyll	Succeeded by Morgan Randyll; Robert Wroth
Preceded by Heneage Finch; Thomas Onslow	Member of Parliament for Surrey; 1717–1721; With: Heneage Finch 1717–1719; John Walter 1719–1721	Succeeded by John Walter; Sir William Scawen
Political offices
Unknown	Out-Ranger of Windsor Forest; 1694?–1711	Unknown
Preceded by Thomas Onslow	Out-Ranger of Windsor Forest; 1717–1721	Succeeded by Richard Munden
