= Sir Ambrose Browne, 1st Baronet =

English politician

Sir Ambrose Browne, 1st Baronet (died 1661) was an English politician who sat in the House of Commons of England between 1628 and 1648. He supported the Parliamentary side in the English Civil War.

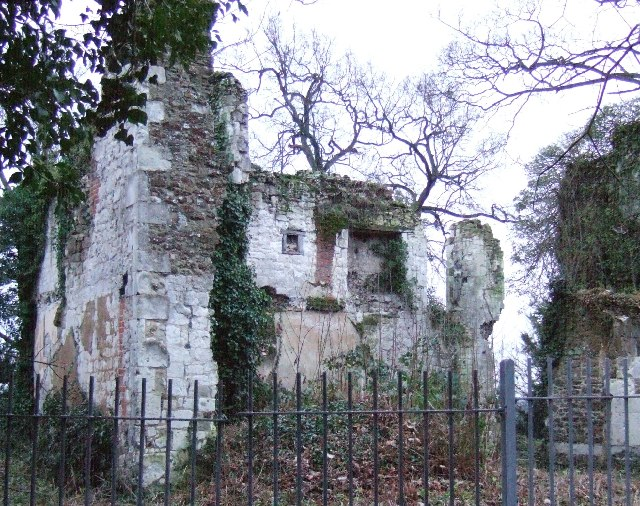
Ruins of Betchworth Castle

Browne was the son of Sir Matthew Browne of Betchworth Castle, Surrey, and his wife Jane Vincent, daughter of Sir Thomas Vincent of Stoke d'Abernon. He was educated at Jesus College, Cambridge. He was created a baronet on 7 July 1627.

In 1628 Browne was elected Member of Parliament for Surrey and held the seat until 1629 when King Charles decided to rule without parliament. He was re-elected for Surrey in April 1640 in the Short Parliament, and again in November 1640 for the Long Parliament. He was excluded from parliament in 1648 under Pride's Purge. He was on various commissions for parliament during the Civil War. In 1654 he was visited by the diarist John Evelyn at his home at Betchworth Castle, near the River Mole at Dorking.

Browne married Elizabeth Adam, daughter of William Adam of Saffron Waldon. His son Adam succeeded to the baronetcy and was also MP for Surrey.

Parliament of England
Preceded by Sir Francis Vincent, 1st Baronet; Sir George More	Member of Parliament for Surrey; 1628–1629; With: Richard Onslow	Parliament suspended until 1640
Vacant Parliament suspended since 1629	Member of Parliament for Surrey; 1640–1648; With: Richard Onslow	Succeeded by Samuel Highland; Lawrence Marsh
Baronetage of England
New creation	Baronet (of Betchworth Castle); 1627–1661	Succeeded by Adam Browne
