= Foot Onslow =

Foot or Foote Onslow (2 June 1655 – 11 May 1710) was a British merchant and member of Parliament. An unsuccessful Turkey merchant in his early years, family influence helped bring him into Parliament for Guildford from 1689 to 1700. After a bitterly contested election in 1698, he left Parliament so that he could retain office as a commissioner of excise. Unsuccessful in his financial affairs, he died in 1710 in reduced circumstances.

== Early life ==
Onslow was born on 2 June 1655, the second son of Sir Arthur Onslow, 1st Baronet and his wife Mary Foote. He matriculated at St Edmund Hall, Oxford on 22 November 1672. He may have originally been intended for another career, but instead apprenticed to a Turkey merchant and became a freeman of the Levant Company in 1676. He lived abroad for some years, but was unsuccessful in business. On 2 February 1688, he married Susanna Anlaby, the daughter and heiress of Thomas Anlaby of Etton, East Riding of Yorkshire and the widow of Arnold Colwall of Woodford, Essex. They had two sons and five daughters:

- Guilielma Maria Onslow (1688–?), married Richard Boswell, of Bow
- Arthur Onslow (1691–1768), Speaker of the House of Commons
- Susanna Onslow (1692–?), married William Cresswell, of Lillingstone Lovell
- Elizabeth Onslow (c.1694–1732), married Francis Drake, of Fleet Street
- Judith Anne Maria Onslow (c.1695–1742?)
- Lt-Gen. Richard Onslow (c.1697–1760), Governor of Plymouth
- Lucretia Onslow (d. 1779)

== Government career ==
Onslow's marriage brought him some property in the borough of Guildford, where his family already had a very strong Parliamentary interest. He stood as a Whig for Guildford in the 1689 English general election and was returned at the top of the poll, succeeding his brother Richard Onslow, elected as member for Surrey. Onslow was returned alongside the Tory John Weston; the third candidate, Morgan Randyll, then aligned with the Whigs, petitioned to include the votes of freemen who did not pay scot and lot, but was unsuccessful.

Onslow seems to have been somewhat active in the Convention Parliament, serving on the committee to inquire into the East India Company. He was appointed to a number of local offices and places, becoming a commissioner for assessment in Surrey and commissioner to prevent the export of wool in 1689, and a justice of the peace for Surrey and commissioner for assessment in Middlesex in 1690. Despite an old rivalry between their families, Onslow and Randyll were able to come to an electoral agreement and were returned for Guildford, apparently without contest by Weston, in the 1690 election.

Onslow's commissionership to prevent the export of wool ended in 1692, but in 1694 he was appointed a commissioner of excise, and thereafter became a reliable Court supporter. Onslow and Randyll were again returned uncontested in the 1695 election, but their relations evidently broke down over the next several years. Randyll's alignment was drifting towards the Country party (he would become a full-blown High Tory during the reign of Anne), and Weston was able to break the Onslow electoral strength at Guildford in the hotly-contested 1698 election. Randyll and Weston topped the poll, but Onslow was declared elected through the connivance of Thomas Hutches, the mayor and returning officer. The irregularity was so gross that Weston was able to turn out Sir Richard Onslow from the Surrey seat in sympathetic reaction. Weston also petitioned against the Guildford result, and while the House ultimately upheld Foot Onslow's election, the proceedings lengthened the Onslows' embarrassment. They were anxious to placate local sentiment, and it was probably Foot who managed the speedy passage of a bill in the borough's interest to unite two of its parishes.

The passage of the Taxation of Members of Parliament Act 1700 made Onslow's office as commissioner of excise incompatible with a seat in Parliament, and he chose to resign, keeping the commissionership until his death. He was succeeded by his uncle, Denzil Onslow. He moved to his wife's property at Woodford, and around this time became a JP of Essex. According to his eldest son, Foot was "of good use" in Parliament "by his skill in matters which related to the revenue," but was not "the best manager of his affairs". Never flourishing in business, he lived beyond his means to keep up appearances as an MP and an Onslow until his circumstances were badly reduced. Worn out by anxiety, he died on 11 May 1710 and was buried at Woodford.

Parliament of England
Preceded by Richard Onslow; Heneage Finch	Member of Parliament for Guildford; 1689–1700; With: John Weston 1689–1690; Morgan Randyll 1690–1700	Succeeded by Morgan Randyll; Denzil Onslow
