= Heneage Finch, 1st Earl of Aylesford =

English lawyer and statesman

The Right Honourable The Earl of Aylesford PC KC
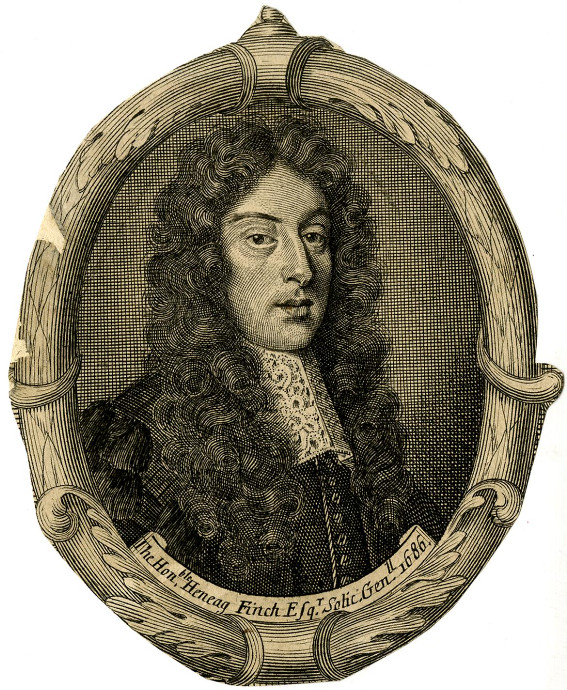

Chancellor of the Duchy of Lancaster
- In office 6 November 1714 – 12 March 1716
- Monarch: George I
- Preceded by: The Lord Berkeley of Stratton
- Succeeded by: The Earl of Scarbrough

Member of Parliament for Oxford University
- In office 1701–1703
- Preceded by: Sir Christopher Musgrave, Bt; Sir William Glynne, Bt
- Succeeded by: William Bromley; Sir William Whitelocke
- In office 1689–1698
- Preceded by: Charles Perrot; George Clarke
- Succeeded by: Sir Christopher Musgrave, Bt; Sir William Glynne, Bt
- In office 1679–1679
- Preceded by: Laurence Hyde; Thomas Thynne
- Succeeded by: Sir Leoline Jenkins; Charles Perrot

Member of Parliament for Guildford
- In office 1685–1689
- Preceded by: Richard Onslow; Morgan Randyll
- Succeeded by: Foot Onslow; John Weston

Solicitor General
- In office 1679–1686
- Preceded by: Sir Francis Winnington
- Succeeded by: Sir Thomas Powys

Personal details
- Born: 1649
- Died: 22 July 1719 (aged 69–70)
- Party: Tory
- Spouse: Elizabeth Banks (m. 1678)
- Parent: Heneage Finch, 1st Earl of Nottingham
- Education: Westminster School
- Alma mater: Christ Church, Oxford

Arms of Finch: Argent, a chevron between three griffins passant sable

Heneage Finch, 1st Earl of Aylesford, PC, KC (c. 1649 – 22 July 1719) was an English lawyer and statesman.

== Early life ==
Finch was second son of Heneage Finch, 1st Earl of Nottingham and the former Elizabeth Hervey (eldest daughter of Daniel Hervey).

His paternal grandparents were Hon. Sir Heneage Finch, Speaker of the House of Commons (third son of Sir Moyle Finch, 1st Baronet and Elizabeth Finch, 1st Countess of Winchilsea) and Frances Bell (daughter of Sir Edmond Bell of Beaupré Hall).

He was educated at Westminster School and at Christ Church, Oxford, where he matriculated on 18 November 1664.

== Career ==
In 1673, he became a barrister of the Inner Temple; king's counsel and bencher in 1677; and in 1679, during the chancellorship of his father, was appointed Solicitor General, being returned to parliament for Oxford University, and in 1685 for Guildford.

In 1682, he represented the crown in the attack upon the Corporation of London, and next year in the prosecution of Lord Russell, when, according to Gilbert Burnet, and in several other trials afterwards, he showed more of a vicious eloquence in turning matters with some subtlety against the prisoners than of strict or sincere reasoning. He does not, however, appear to have exceeded the duties of prosecutor for the crown as they were then understood. In 1684, in the trial of Algernon Sidney, he argued that the unpublished treatise of the accused was an overt act, and supported the opinion of Jeffreys that scribere est agere (to write is to act). The same year he was counsel for James II in his successful action against Titus Oates for libel, and in 1685 prosecuted Oates for the crown for perjury.

Finch, however, though a Tory and a crown lawyer, was a staunch churchman, and on his refusal in 1686 to defend the royal dispensing power he was summarily dismissed by James. He was the leading counsel in June 1688 for the Seven Bishops, when he strangely exposed and very boldly ran down the dispensing power, but his mistaken tactics were nearly the cause of his clients losing their case.

He sat again for Oxford University in the convention parliament, which constituency he represented in all the following assemblies except that of 1698, until his elevation to the peerage. He was, however, no supporter of the House of Orange, advocated a regency in James's name, and was one of the few who in the House of Commons opposed the famous vote that James had broken the contract between king and people and left the throne vacant. He held no office during William's reign, and is described by John Macky as always a great opposer of the administration.

In 1689, he joined in voting for the reversal of Lord Russell's attainder, and endeavoured to defend his conduct in the trial, but was refused a hearing by the House. He opposed the Triennial Bill of 1692, but in 1696, spoke against the bill of association and test, which was voted for the king's protection, on the ground that though William was to be obeyed as sovereign he could not be acknowledged rightful and lawful king. In 1694, he argued against the crown in the bankers case.

In 1703, he was created Baron Guernsey and a privy councillor, and after the accession of George I in 1714, Earl of Aylesford, being reappointed a privy councillor and made Chancellor of the Duchy of Lancaster, which office he retained until February 1716.

=== Works ===
According to John Macky (Memoirs, p. 71; published by Roxburghe Club, 1895) he was accounted one of the greatest orators in England and a good common lawyer; a firm asserter of the prerogative of the crown and jurisdiction of the church; a tall, thin black man. He was eloquent, industrious, and judicious, with inflexible integrity.

Many of his legal arguments are printed in State Trials (see esp. viii. 694, 1087, ix. 625, 880, 996, X. 126, 319, 405, 1199, xii. 183, 353, 365). Wood attributes to him on the faith of common rumour the authorship of An Antidote against Poison . . .Remarks upon a Paper printed by Lady (Rachel) Russel (1683), ascribed in State Trials (ix. 710) to Sir Bartholomew Shower; but see the latter's allusion to it on p. 753. In Hist. of His Own Times, i. 556. Swift has appended a note, an arrant rascal, but Finch's great offence with the dean was probably his advancement by George I. rather than his conduct of state trials as here described.

== Personal life ==
On 16 May 1678, he was married to Elizabeth Banks, daughter and co-heiress of Sir John Banks of Aylesford. Together, Elizabeth and Heneage were the parents of three sons and six daughters, including:

- Lady Elizabeth Finch (1679–1757), who married Robert Benson, 1st Baron Bingley.
- Heneage Finch, 2nd Earl of Aylesford (1683–1757), who married Mary Fisher, daughter of Sir Clement Fisher, 3rd Baronet.
- Lady Anne Finch (d. 1751), who married William Legge, 1st Earl of Dartmouth.
- Hon. John Finch (d. 1739/40), who married his cousin Elizabeth Savile in 1726.
- Lady Frances Finch (d. 1759), who married Sir John Bland, 5th Baronet.

He died on 22 July 1719. Upon his death, his eldest son Heneage succeeded him as 2nd Earl of Aylesford. The 2nd Earl died in 1757, and since this date the earldom has been held by his direct descendants, six of whom in succession have borne the Christian name of Heneage.

Political offices
Preceded by The Lord Berkeley of Stratton	Chancellor of the Duchy of Lancaster; 1714–1716	Succeeded by The Earl of Scarborough
Legal offices
Preceded by Sir Francis Winnington	Solicitor General; 1679–1686	Succeeded by Sir Thomas Powys
Parliament of England
Preceded by Laurence Hyde; Thomas Thynne	Member of Parliament for Oxford University; 1679; With: John Eddisbury	Succeeded by Sir Leoline Jenkins; Charles Perrot
Preceded by Richard Onslow; Morgan Randyll	Member of Parliament for Guildford; 1685–1689; With: Richard Onslow	Succeeded by Foot Onslow; John Weston
Preceded by Charles Perrot; George Clarke	Member of Parliament for Oxford University; 1689–1698; With: Sir Thomas Clarges 1689–1695; Sir William Trumbull 1695–1698	Succeeded by Sir Christopher Musgrave, Bt; Sir William Glynne, Bt
Preceded by Sir Christopher Musgrave, Bt; Sir William Glynne, Bt	Member of Parliament for Oxford University; 1701–1703; With: Sir Christopher Musgrave, Bt 1701; William Bromley 1701–1703	Succeeded by William Bromley; Sir William Whitelocke
Peerage of Great Britain
New creation	Earl of Aylesford; 1714–1719	Succeeded by Heneage Finch
Peerage of England
New creation	Baron Guernsey; 1703–1719	Succeeded by Heneage Finch
