= Morgan Randyll =

English lawyer and Tory politician

Morgan Randyll (1649 – 1738 or later), of Chilworth Manor, Surrey was an English lawyer and Tory politician who sat in the English and British House of Commons between 1679 and 1722.

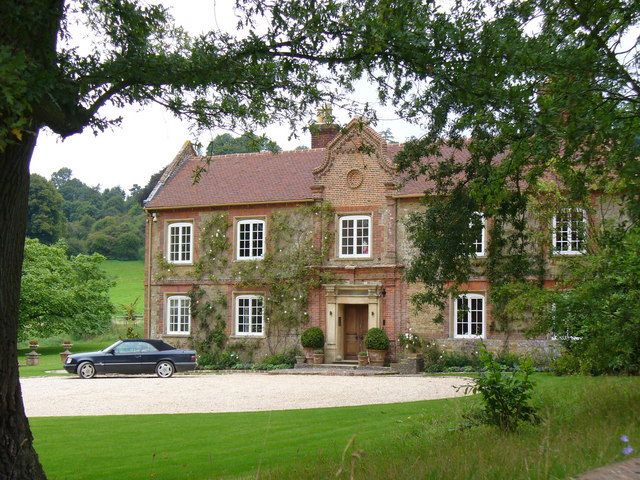
Chilworth Manor, Surrey

Randyll was the eldest son of Vincent Randyll of Chilworth and his wife Dorothy Duncombe, daughter of John Duncombe of Weston, Surrey. He matriculated at Wadham College, Oxford, in 1666 and was awarded a BA in 1670, and in the same year was admitted at the Middle Temple. In 1673, he inherited Chilworth Manor from his father. In 1677, he was called to the bar. He married Anne Gould, the daughter and coheiress of Sir Thomas Gould, draper, of Aldermanbury, London by licence dated 5 February 1678.

Randyll was elected a Member of Parliament for Guildford in October 1679 and again in 1681. He was selected High Sheriff of Surrey for the year 1686 to 1687 and served as a Deputy-lieutenant of the county from February to October 1688 and from 1702 onwards. He was returned again for Guildford in 1690, 1695, 1698, February 1701, December 1701, 1702, 1708, 3 February 1711 and 1713. He was returned again at Guildford unopposed at the 1715 British general election but the cumulative cost of his electioneering forced him to sell his property in Chilworth in 1720. He stood for Guildford for the last time at the 1722 British general election, but was defeated in a contest. In due course, he was committed to a debtors' prison.

Randyll died in obscurity sometime after 1735, leaving two daughters, one of whom married Gilbert Vane, 2nd Baron Barnard.

Parliament of England
Preceded by Thomas Dalmahoy; Richard Onslow	Member of Parliament for Guildford; With: Richard Onslow	Succeeded by Heneage Finch; Richard Onslow
Preceded by Foot Onslow; John Weston	Member of Parliament for Guildford; 1690–1705; With: Foot Onslow 1690-1701; Denzil Onslow 1701-1705	Succeeded by Denzil Onslow; Robert Wroth
Parliament of Great Britain
Preceded by Denzil Onslow; Robert Wroth	Member of Parliament for Guildford; 1708–1710; With: Denzil Onslow	Succeeded by Denzil Onslow; Robert Wroth
Preceded by Denzil Onslow; Robert Wroth	Member of Parliament for Guildford; 1711–1722; With: Denzil Onslow 1711-1713, 1714-1717; Richard Onslow 1713-1714; Robert Wroth 1717-1720; Arthur Onslow 1720-1722	Succeeded by Arthur Onslow; Thomas Brodrick
