= Browne baronets =

Extinct baronetcy in the Baronetage of England

There have been ten baronetcies created for persons with the surname Browne (as distinct from Brown and Broun), six in the Baronetage of Great Britain, three in the Baronetage of Ireland and one in the Baronetage of Nova Scotia. Only one creation is extant as of 2010. Three of the creations were for members of the Browne family headed by the Viscount Montagu.

== Browne baronets, of Walcot (1621) ==
The Browne Baronetcy, of Walcot in the County of Northampton, was created in the Baronetage of England on 21 September 1621 for Robert Browne. He was a descendant of Sir John Browne, Lord Mayor of London in 1480. The title became extinct on the death of the third Baronet in circa 1662.

- Sir Robert Browne, 1st Baronet (died c. 1624)
- Sir Thomas Browne, 2nd Baronet (died 1635) who married Anne the daughter of Sir Guy Palmes of Lindley.
- Sir Robert Browne, 3rd Baronet (died c. 1662)

== Browne baronets, of Molahiffe (1622) ==
The Browne Baronetcy, of Molahiffe in the County of Kerry, was created in the Baronetage of Ireland on 16 February 1622. For more information on this creation, see Earl of Kenmare.

== Browne baronets, of Kishack (1622) ==
The Browne Baronetcy, of Kishack in the County of Dublin, was created in the Baronetage of Ireland on 30 March 1622 for Richard Browne, Mayor of Dublin between 1614 and 1615. The title is presumed to have become extinct on the death of the third Baronet in circa 1682.

- Sir Richard Browne, 1st Baronet (died 1642)
- Sir Sylvester Browne, 2nd Baronet (died 1657)
- Sir Richard Browne, 3rd Baronet (died c. 1682)

== Browne baronets, of Betchworth Castle (1627) ==
The Browne Baronetcy, of Betchworth Castle in the County of Surrey, was created in the Baronetage of England on 7 July 1622 for Ambrose Browne, member of parliament for Surrey. The second Baronet also sat as Member of Parliament for Surrey. The title became extinct on his death in 1690. The first Baronet was a descendant of Sir Thomas Browne, Treasurer of the Household to King Henry IV, who was also the ancestor of the Viscounts Montagu. See also the Browne baronets of Kiddington and the Browne baronets of Caversham below.

- Sir Ambrose Browne, 1st Baronet (died 1661)
- Sir Adam Browne, 2nd Baronet (c. 1626–1690)
  - Ambrose Browne (1659–1688)

== Browne baronets, of The Neale (1636) ==
The Browne Baronetcy, of The Neale in the County of Mayo, was created in the Baronetage of Nova Scotia on 21 June 1636. For more information on this creation, see Baron Kilmaine. See also the Browne baronets of Palmerston below and the Marquess of Sligo.

== Browne baronets, of Deptford (1649) ==
The Browne Baronetcy, of Deptford in the County of Kent, was created in the Baronetage of England on 1 September 1649 for Richard Browne, Ambassador to France between 1641 and 1660. The title became extinct on his death in 1683.

- Sir Richard Browne, 1st Baronet (c. 1605–1683)

== Browne baronets, of Kiddington (1659) ==
The Browne Baronetcy, of Kiddington in the County of Oxford, was created in the Baronetage of England on 1 July 1659 for Henry Browne, with remainder in default of male issue of his own to his brother Francis Browne and the male issue of his body. (Note: Cokayne 1903, p. 21 footnote c: This, apparently, is the first special remainder of a Baronetcy, inasmuch as the remainder to heirs male whatsoever, which was the usual on in the Baronetcies of Scotland, cannot (though a most extensive one) be called special in Scottish cases.) He was the grandson of the Hon. Sir Henry Browne, younger son of Anthony Browne, 1st Viscount Montagu (see Viscount Montagu and the Browne baronets of Bettesworth Castle above and the Browne baronets of Caversham below). Despite the special remainder, Browne was succeeded by his son, the second Baronet. The title became extinct on the death of the latter's son, the third Baronet, in 1754.

- Sir Henry Browne, 1st Baronet (c. 1639–1689)
- Sir Charles Browne, 2nd Baronet (c. 1667–1751)
- Sir George Browne, 3rd Baronet (c. 1694–1754)

== Browne baronets, of London (1660) ==
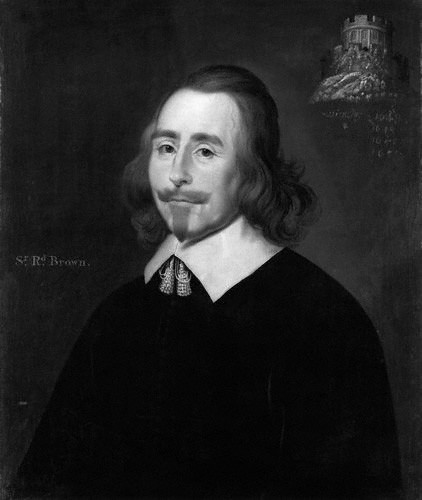
Sir Richard Browne, 1st Baronet, of London

The Browne Baronetcy, of London, was created in the Baronetage of England on 22 July 1660 for Richard Browne, member of parliament for Ludgershall and Lord Mayor of London. The second Baronet represented Wycombe in Parliament. The title became either dormant or extinct on the death of the fifth Baronet in 1739.

- Sir Richard Browne, 1st Baronet (died 1669)
- Sir Richard Browne, 2nd Baronet (died 1684)
- Sir Richard Browne, 3rd Baronet (c. 1656–1689)
- Sir John Browne, 4th Baronet (died 1701)
- Sir Thomas Browne, 5th Baronet (died 1739)

== Browne baronets, of Caversham (1665) ==
The Browne Baronetcy, of Caversham in the County of Oxford, was created in the Baronetage of England on 10 May 1665 for John Browne. He was the grandson of the Hon. Sir George Browne, younger son of Anthony Browne, 1st Viscount Montagu (see Viscount Montagu and the Browne Baronets of Bettesworth Castle and the Browne Baronets of Kiddington above). Three of his sons, the second, third and fourth Baronets, all succeeded to the title. The title became extinct on the death of the latter's son, the fifth Baronet, in 1775.

- Sir John Browne, 1st Baronet (c. 1631-c. 1680)
- Sir Anthony Browne, 2nd Baronet (died 1688)
- Sir John Browne, 3rd Baronet (died c. 1692)
- Sir George Browne, 4th Baronet (died 1730)
- Sir John Browne, 5th Baronet (died 1775)

== Browne, later de Beauvoir baronets, of Palmerston (1797) ==
The Browne, later de Beauvoir Baronetcy, of Palmerston in the County of Mayo, was created in the Baronetage of Ireland on 8 December 1797 for John Browne. He was a great-grandson of Dominick Browne, younger son of the first Baronet of the 1636 creation (see above). Dominick's half-brother Colonel John Browne was the ancestor of both the Barons Kilmaine and the Marquesses of Sligo. The first Baronet's eldest son, the second Baronet, assumed by Royal licence the surname of de Beauvoir in lieu of his patronymic in 1826. He was knighted the following year and later sat as Member of Parliament for Windsor. He was childless and was succeeded by his younger brother, the third Baronet. He had retained the surname Browne. He had no surviving children and on his death in 1890 the title became extinct.

- Sir John Edmond Browne, 1st Baronet (1748–1835)
- Sir John Edmond de Beauvoir, 2nd Baronet (1794–1869)
- Sir Charles Manley Browne, 3rd Baronet (1806–1890)

== See also ==
- Brown baronets
- Broun baronets
- Viscount Montagu
- Marquess of Sligo
