= Out-Ranger of Windsor Forest =

Official post associated with the royal forest of Windsor

The Out-Ranger of Windsor Forest was an official post associated with the royal forest of Windsor Great Park in England.

The nominal duties of the out-ranger were to preserve any deer which escaped the bounds of Windsor Forest. (Under forest law, the Sovereign owned all the deer within a royal forest, even though they might not be crown property.) In practice, the office was a sinecure.

The first known appointment to the position was that of Denzil Onslow in 1686 or 1694. He was deprived of his office in 1711 when the Junto Whigs were crushed. In 1715, the office was granted to Denzil's great-nephew Hon. Thomas Onslow. While it provided an emolument for him, the principal purpose of the appointment was to force Thomas to vacate his seat as Member of Parliament for Guildford, under the terms of the Place Act 1707. By removing him from the House of Commons, he could now stand in the by-election for Surrey, which had been vacated when his father Richard was made a Teller of the Exchequer. (Richard was about to be made a peer, hence his failure to stand in the by-election himself.) Two years later, when Thomas succeeded to his father's barony, Denzil Onslow again received the office for the same reason, vacating his seat at Guildford to successfully contest Surrey. This presaged the use of other offices of profit under the Crown as a means of resignation from the British House of Commons, which became formalised in the offices of Steward of the Chiltern Hundreds and Steward of Northstead.

Denzil held the office until his death in 1721. Brigadier Richard Munden was appointed in 1722, but died in September 1725. He left his financial affairs considerably entangled, and the underkeepers who performed the duties of the office had to petition for the arrears of their salaries. He was succeeded by John King, 2nd Baron King, who had a grant of the office for life in 1726; his brother Peter King, 3rd Baron King succeeded him in 1740, but the office was again granted to an Onslow in 1754.

George Onslow was the second cousin once removed of Thomas, who had held the office until 1717. He held the office until the beginning of 1763, when Fox purged the government of Newcastle's supporters. It went to Lord Charles Spencer, who lost it on the fall of the Bute Ministry and was replaced by Benjamin Bathurst. Bathurst, in turn, was displaced by the Rockingham administration. The office now passed to Col. George Onslow, first cousin to the previous George, who received a grant of it for life for supporting the ministry. Upon his death, it was given to Viscount Cranley, the son of the first George Onslow, who held it until its abolition in the early 19th century.

== Salary and perquisites ==
The office was originally unsalaried, but after its revival in 1715, it paid £600 per year, of which about £200 had to be dispersed to pay under-keepers. Another source gives the salary as £500 per year, increased to £900 around 1776. It had grown to £1,200 per year when the office was abolished.

A small lodge named Fan Grove on the edge of Windsor Forest was formerly the property of the out-ranger. It was used as a residence by Admiral Sir Richard Onslow, 1st Baronet, younger brother of Col. George Onslow.

== List of Out-Rangers ==
- Denzil Onslow 1686 or 12 April 1694 – 1711
- unknown 1711 – 1715
- Thomas Onslow 21 November 1715 – 1717
- Denzil Onslow 18 December 1717 – 27 June 1721
- Brig. Richard Munden 1722 – 19 September 1725
- John King, 2nd Baron King 1 July 1726 – 10 February 1740
- Peter King, 3rd Baron King 18 April 1740 – 22 March 1754
- George Onslow 13 April 1754 – 1763
- Lord Charles Spencer 29 January 1763 – April 1763
- Benjamin Bathurst 7 May 1763 – July 1765
- Col. George Onslow 1765–1792
- Thomas Onslow, 2nd Earl of Onslow 1792–1827
