= Leoline Jenkins =

Welsh politician (1625–1685)

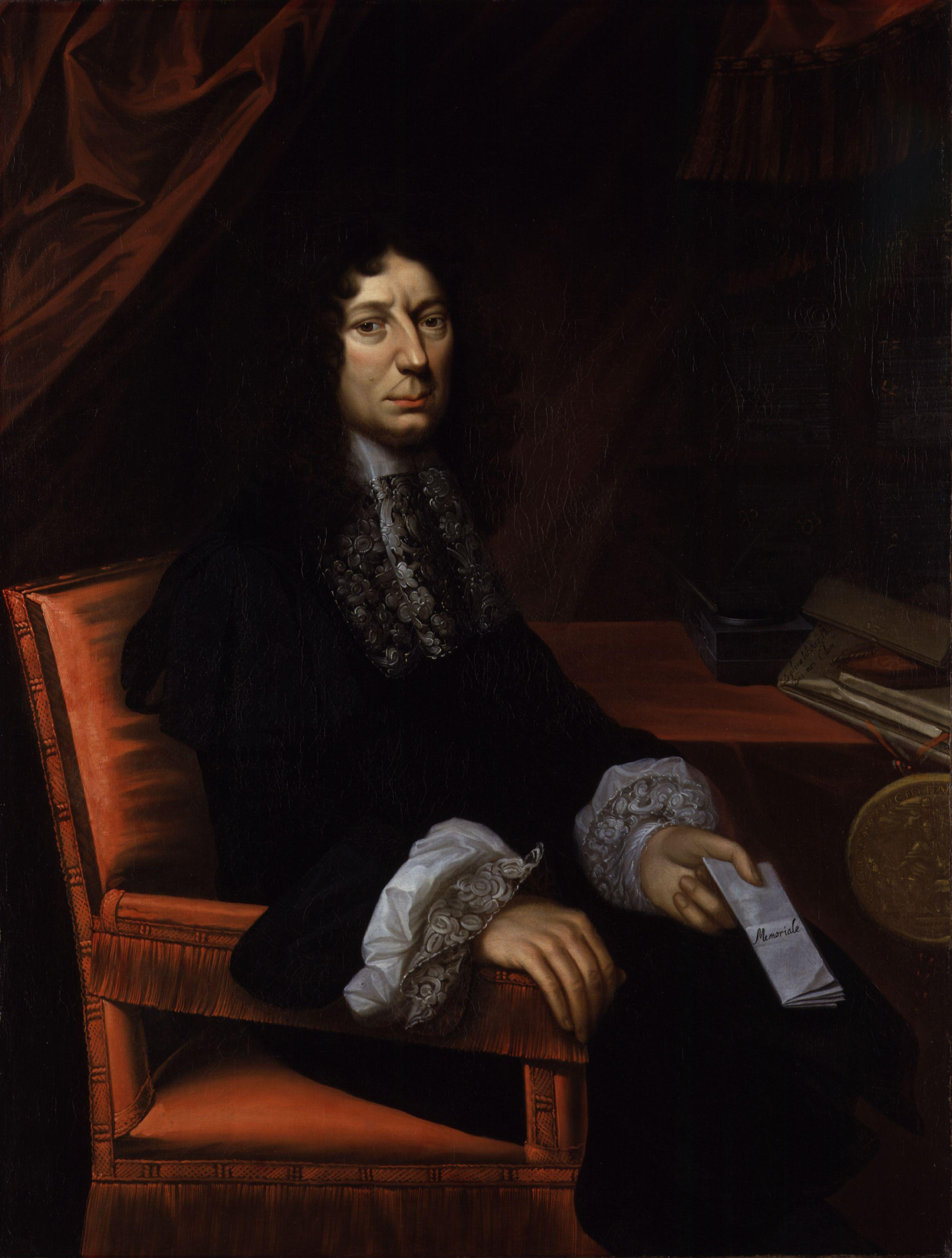
1679 portrait of Sir Leoline Jenkins by Herbert Tuer

Sir Leoline Jenkins (1625 – 1 September 1685) was a Welsh academic, diplomat involved in the negotiation of international treaties (e.g. Nimègue), jurist and politician. He was a clerical lawyer who served as Judge of the High Court of Admiralty from 1668 to 1685, and enjoyed a high reputation for judicial integrity. As a statesman he served as Secretary of State from 1680 to 1684.

== Biography ==
He was originally from Llantrisant in south Wales, son of Leoline (an anglicisation of Llewellyn) Jenkins, a small landowner. He himself spoke fluent Welsh, and was fond of quoting Welsh proverbs, sometimes to the bewilderment of his listeners. He went to school in the nearby town of Cowbridge and then to Jesus College, Oxford.

== Civil War and Interregnum ==
Jenkins fought on the Royalist side during the English Civil War. On the failure of the Royalist cause, he retired to Glamorgan in 1648, and entered the household of the Welsh Royalist Sir John Aubrey, first of the Aubrey baronets, at Llantrithyd, as did his two most valuable patrons, Gilbert Sheldon, the future Archbishop of Canterbury, and Sir Francis Mansell, Jenkins' predecessor as Principal of Jesus College.

He set up a small private school for the education of Aubrey's son and other local boys, but it was broken up by Parliament in 1651 as a seminary for potential traitors. He moved with some of his pupils to Oxford, where he set up another school known popularly as "the Little Welsh Hall", but in 1655 he was forced to flee to the Continent. At the Restoration of Charles II he was made a fellow of Jesus College and became Principal on Mansell's retirement the following year.

== Restoration ==
As Principal of Jesus College from 1661 to 1673, he was responsible for much construction work, including the college library. The position was one of several rewards he received from King Charles II of England for his loyalty to the Royalist cause during the English Civil War.

=== Judge ===
Due to his close friendship with Archbishop Sheldon, he was also created a judge, first of the consistory court of Westminster, then of the Arches Court and finally of the Court of Admiralty. As Judge of the Court of Admiralty he won Samuel Pepys' warm praise for his ability and integrity, although Pepys was told that his appointment had not been welcomed by the advocates at Doctors' Commons. He played a crucial role in the development of English Admiralty law as a coherent body of legal principles.

He was also an expert on international law. On the death of the queen mother Henrietta Maria at Colombes in August 1669, Jenkins was sent to Paris to argue that the disposition of her personal property was governed by English, not French law: the result would be that the property would pass in its entirety to Charles II, rather than to his sister Henrietta, Duchess of Orleans, who would have been the beneficiary under French law. His arguments were successful and on his return to England, Charles rewarded him with a knighthood.

=== Diplomat ===
He was one of the Commissioners appointed to negotiate the abortive Union with Scotland in 1669. In the 1670s he spent much of his time on the Continent engaged in a number of diplomatic missions. Notably, he was England's principal representative at the Congress of Nijmegen (1676-1679) which brought to an end the Franco-Dutch War, and for a time the sole representative. Critics said that he was "in agony" at being left with the sole responsibility for making decisions. Certainly, as the English government ruefully admitted, Nijmegen was "far from being such a peace as his Majesty would have wished for", although the unsatisfactory outcome from the English point of view was largely due to the resentment of English interference by both French and Dutch representatives at the Congress, rather than to any blunder by Jenkins.

== Secretary of State ==
Jenkins was made a privy counsellor in February 1680. During the Exclusion Crisis he vehemently opposed Exclusion, and acted as the effective Government leader in the Commons. After the failure of Exclusion he played a major role in the so-called "Tory Revenge", the 1681-4 campaign to crush the Whig opposition.

He served as Secretary of State for the Northern Department from 26 April 1680 to 2 February 1681 and Secretary of State for the Southern Department from 2 February 1681 to 14 April 1684. His major legislative achievements include authoring the Statute of Frauds (29 Cha. 2. c. 3) and the Statute of Distributions (22 & 23 Cha. 2. c. 10), dealing with the inheritance of personal property. Whilst Secretary of State, he was served by the Welsh lawyer (and former student of Jesus College) Owen Wynne, who has been called "an early example of the permanent civil servant."

As a Minister, if not noted for brilliance, he was hard-working and incorruptible. Though Gilbert Burnet found him "heavy and dull" he could show great spirit and determination when necessary. At a meeting of the Privy Council in October 1681, some of the Councillors, Jenkins wrote to a colleague, "were pleased to fall upon me" for not sharing with them important items of foreign policy. Jenkins staunchly defended the practice of keeping such information strictly confidential. He argued that the Secretaries of State "were not at liberty to carry any part of their intelligences to the Council, unless his Majesty directed it specifically": this was a rule which he had always followed and by which he was "indispensably bound".

In failing health, he retired in 1684 to his house at Hammersmith and died there the following year. He never married.

He is regarded as the second founder of the eminent Cowbridge Grammar School, renowned for its academic standards which he had himself attended. He is buried in the chapel of Jesus College, at which he had previously been a student before becoming Principal, and to which he bequeathed most of his estate.

== Leoline Fellows ==
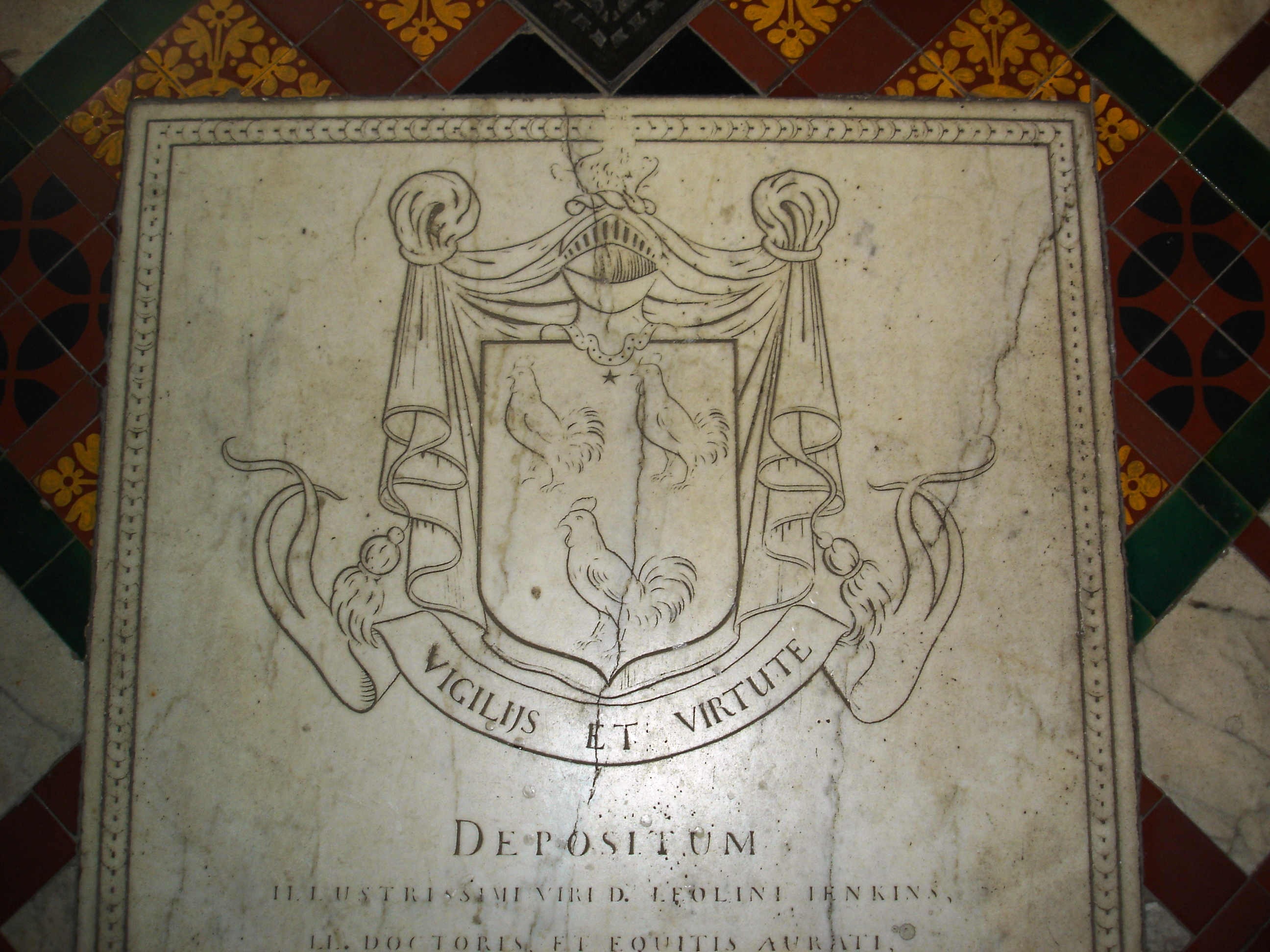
His tombstone in the chapel of Jesus College, Oxford

In his will, Jenkins stated: "It is but too obvious that the persons in Holy Orders employed in his Majesty's fleet at sea and foreign plantations are too few". To address this, he established two Fellowships at Jesus College, whose holders should serve as clergy "in any of his Majesty's fleets or in his Majesty's plantations" under the direction of the Lord High Admiral and the Bishop of London respectively. The last such fellow, Frederick de Winton, was appointed in 1876 and held his fellowship until his death in 1932. This category of fellowship was abolished in 1877 by the Oxford and Cambridge Universities Commission, without prejudice to the rights of existing holders such as de Winton.

Political offices
Preceded by The Earl of Sunderland	Secretary of State for the Northern Department; 1680–1681	Succeeded by The Earl of Conway
Preceded by The Earl of Sunderland	Secretary of State for the Southern Department; 1681–1684	Succeeded by The Earl of Sunderland
Parliament of England
Preceded by John Hervey; Sir Henry Wood, Bt	Member of Parliament for Hythe; 1673–1679; With: John Hervey	Succeeded by Sir Edward Dering, Bt; Julius Deedes
Preceded by Heneage Finch; John Eddisbury	Member of Parliament for Oxford University; 1679–1681; With: Charles Perrot	Succeeded by Charles Perrot; George Clarke
