= Richard Onslow, 1st Baron Onslow =

British politician (1654–1717)

The Right Honourable The Lord Onslow PC
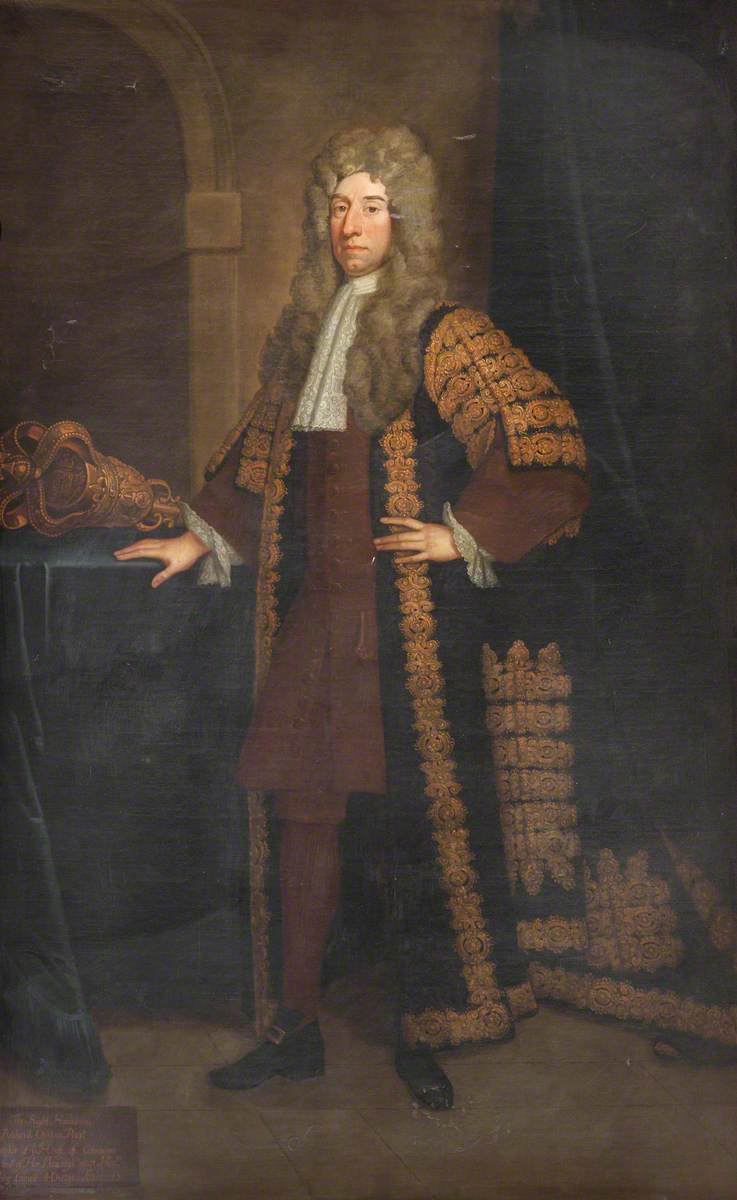

Speaker of the House of Commons of Great Britain
- In office 1708–1710
- Preceded by: John Smith
- Succeeded by: William Bromley

Chancellor of the Exchequer
- In office 13 October 1714 – 12 October 1715
- Preceded by: William Wyndham
- Succeeded by: Robert Walpole

Lord Commissioner of the Admiralty
- In office 5 June 1690 – 15 April 1693

Lord Lieutenant of Surrey
- In office 1716–1717
- Preceded by: John Campbell
- Succeeded by: Thomas Onslow

Personal details
- Born: 23 June 1654 Surrey, England
- Died: 5 December 1717 (aged 63) Great Britain
- Party: British Whig Party
- Spouse: Elizabeth Tulse
- Children: 4, including Thomas

Richard Onslow, 1st Baron Onslow PC (23 June 1654 – 5 December 1717), known as Sir Richard Onslow, 2nd Baronet from 1688 until 1716, was a British Whig politician who sat in the English and British House of Commons from 1679 to 1715. He was Speaker of the House of Commons from 1708 to 1710 and Chancellor of the Exchequer from 1714 to 1715. Onslow was a very unpopular figure amongst members of both political parties, particularly during his time as Speaker. He was extremely pedantic and showed an absolute devotion to principle, as a result, he was given the nickname "Stiff Dick".

== Biography ==
Onslow's father, Arthur, was a politician, as was his maternal grandfather Thomas Foote, who had served as the Lord Mayor of London in 1649. He was born in Surrey and matriculated at St Edmund Hall, Oxford on 7 June 1671, before being called to the Inner Temple. He entered Parliament as the Member for Guildford in 1679 before he could be called to the bar. One of Onslow's first actions as a member of Parliament was to support the Exclusion Bill, which aimed, unsuccessfully, to deny the Catholic James II of England the British throne. He was re-elected in 1685. He also served as a Lord of the Admiralty from 1690 to 1693.

Onslow was an active back-bencher during his early years in Parliament, and his increasing notoriety as a moderate Whig led to him being nominated for the position of Speaker in 1700 when the member for Surrey. He was unsuccessful in this bid, losing out to the Tory candidate, Robert Harley. However, Onslow managed to attain the position of Speaker seven years later, in 1708. He proved to be a poor Speaker as he made no effort whatsoever to show any kind of neutrality, a fact which upset all but the most fervent Whigs. Onslow's pedantry as Speaker also enhanced his unpopularity. The most famous incident during his Speakership came during the trial of the preacher Dr. Henry Sacheverell, in which Onslow played a large part. When Onslow took the Commons to the House of Lords to hear their judgment on the case he challenged Black Rod on a trifling point of privilege, delaying the proceedings somewhat, which infuriated almost everyone in attendance. Onslow's unpopularity by this point was such that he failed to retain his seat in the 1710 election. In order to remain in the Commons he was forced to sit instead for the rotten borough of St Mawes.

Onslow regained much of his political favour four years later, now restored as the member for Surrey. Upon the death of Queen Anne in 1714 Onslow was a vocal advocate of a Protestant successor, in return for his support Onslow was rewarded by being named as Chancellor of the Exchequer, a position he held for around a year before resigning. He became Father of the House in 1713, and was created Baron Onslow on 19 July 1716.

He served as Lord Lieutenant of Surrey from 1716 until his death the following year. He had married Elizabeth, the daughter and heiress of Sir Henry Tulse, Lord Mayor of London, with whom he had two sons and two daughters. He was succeeded by his son Thomas. His nephew Arthur Onslow later became a long-serving Speaker himself.

Parliament of England
Preceded by Arthur Onslow; Thomas Dalmahoy	Member of Parliament for Guildford; 1679–1689; With: Thomas Dalmahoy 1679; Morgan Randyll 1679–1685; Heneage Finch 1685–1689	Succeeded by Foot Onslow; John Weston
Preceded by Sir Adam Browne, Bt; Sir Edward Evelyn, Bt	Member of Parliament for Surrey; 1689–1707; With: George Evelyn 1689–1690; Sir Francis Vincent, Bt 1690–1695; Denzil Onslow 1695–1689; John Weston 1698–1702; Leonard Wessell 1701–1705; Sir William Scawen 1705–1707	Succeeded by Parliament of Great Britain
Parliament of Great Britain
Preceded by Parliament of England	Member of Parliament for Surrey; 1707–1710; With: Sir William Scawen	Succeeded by Lord Guernsey; Sir Francis Vincent, Bt
Preceded by John Smith	Speaker of the House of Commons of Great Britain; 1708–1710	Succeeded by William Bromley
Preceded by Francis Godfrey; John Tredenham	Member of Parliament for St Mawes; 1710–1713; With: John Tredenham 1710–1711; John Anstis 1711–1713	Succeeded by Edward Rolt; Francis Scobell
Preceded by Denzil Onslow; Morgan Randyll	Member of Parliament for Guildford; 1713–1714; With: Morgan Randyll	Succeeded by Morgan Randyll; Denzil Onslow
Preceded by Lord Guernsey; Sir Francis Vincent, Bt	Member of Parliament for Surrey; 1713–1715; With: Lord Guernsey	Succeeded by Lord Guernsey; Thomas Onslow
Preceded by Thomas Strangways	Father of the House; 1713–1715	Succeeded by Thomas Erle
Political offices
Preceded by William Wyndham	Chancellor of the Exchequer of Great Britain; 1714–1715	Succeeded by Robert Walpole
Preceded by The Lord De La Warr	Teller of the Exchequer; 1715–1717	Succeeded by The Lord Torrington
Honorary titles
Preceded by The Duke of Argyll	Lord Lieutenant of Surrey; 1716–1717	Succeeded by The Lord Onslow
Peerage of Great Britain
New creation	Baron Onslow; 1716–1717	Succeeded by Thomas Onslow
Baronetage of England
Preceded by Arthur Onslow	Baronet (of West Clandon, Surrey); 1688–1717	Succeeded by Thomas Onslow
