= Sir Adam Browne, 2nd Baronet =

English politician

Sir Adam Browne, 2nd Baronet, DL, JP (c. 1626 – 1690) was an English politician who sat in the House of Commons in two periods between 1661 and 1689. He fought in the Royalist army in the English Civil War.

Browne was the son of Sir Ambrose Browne, 1st Baronet of Betchworth Castle, Surrey and his wife Elizabeth Adam, daughter of William Adam of Saffron Waldon. He was educated at Christ's College, Cambridge, and although his father, as MP for Surrey, had supported the Parliamentary side, Browne supported the Royalist army in the Civil War. He was a colonel of the horse in the Royalist Army until 1646 and took part in the Surrey uprising in 1648.

In 1660, Browne was ineligible to stand in the Convention Parliament. However he became a J.P. for Surrey in March 1660, a major in the regiment of Sir Ashley Cooper from July to November 1660 and a Deputy Lieutenant and commissioner for assessment in August 1660. In 1661, he was elected Member of Parliament for Surrey in the Cavalier Parliament and succeeded to the baronetcy on the death of his father later in the same year. He held the seat until 1679. He was re-elected for Surrey in 1685 and held the seat until 1689. He was a staunch opponent of religious toleration and was temporarily deprived of local offices at the end the reign of James II.

Browne married Philippa Cooper, daughter of Sir John Cooper, 1st Baronet of Rockbourne and Wimborne St Giles, Dorset. His son Ambrose Browne who was MP for Bletchingley predeceased him and the baronetcy became extinct.

Browne died in 1690 and was buried at Dorking on 3 November.

Parliament of England
Preceded by The Lord Aungier; Daniel Harvey	Member of Parliament for Surrey; 1661–1679; With: Sir Edmund Bowyer	Succeeded by Arthur Onslow; George Evelyn
Preceded by Arthur Onslow; George Evelyn	Member of Parliament for Surrey; 1685–1689; With: Sir Edward Evelyn	Succeeded by Sir Richard Onslow; George Evelyn
Baronetage of England
Preceded by Ambrose Browne	Baronet (of Betchworth Castle); 1661–1690	Extinct
