= Charles Perrot (politician) =

English politician

Charles Perrot (1642 – 10 June 1686) was an English politician. He was Member of Parliament for Oxford University from 1679 until his death.

Perrot was educated at St John's College, Oxford, and became a fellow in 1664.

Parliament of England
Preceded by Heneage Finch; John Eddisbury	Member of Parliament for Oxford University; 1679–1686; With: Sir Leoline Jenkins 1679–1681; George Clarke 1685–1686	Succeeded by Heneage Finch; Sir Thomas Clarges
