= Michael Onslow, 7th Earl of Onslow =

British politician and nobleman (1938-2011)

The Right Honourable The Earl of Onslow
- Onslow in 2011

Member of the House of Lords
- Lord Temporal
- Hereditary peerage 14 September 1971 – 11 November 1999
- Preceded by: The 6th Earl of Onslow
- Succeeded by: Seat abolished
- Elected Hereditary Peer; 11 November 1999 – 14 May 2011
- Election: 1999
- Preceded by: Seat established
- Succeeded by: The 4th Baron Ashton of Hyde

Personal details
- Born: 28 February 1938
- Died: 14 May 2011 (aged 73)
- Party: Conservative
- Spouse: Robin Bullard (m. 1964)
- Children: 3
- Parent(s): William Onslow, 6th Earl of Onslow; Pamela Dillon
- Education: Eton College; University of Paris

Michael William Coplestone Dillon Onslow, 7th Earl of Onslow (28 February 1938 – 14 May 2011), styled Viscount Cranley from 1945 to 1971, was a British Conservative politician.

== Education ==
Onslow was educated at Eton and the Sorbonne.

== Political career ==
Onslow succeeded his father in the earldom in 1971. He was far more colourful and unorthodox, publicly opposing apartheid and police racism, among other issues. He sat on the Conservative benches. He was a supporter of reform of the House of Lords, but not as proposed by Labour. When Tony Blair's Labour government proposed the House of Lords Bill in 1999 to strip voting rights from the mostly Conservative hereditary peers in the House of Lords, Onslow said that he was happy to force a division on every clause of the Scotland Bill; each division takes 20 minutes and there were more than 270 clauses. This was a move to ruin the government's legislative programme in protest at the removal. Onslow added he would "behave like a football hooligan" on this legislative programme, which he opposed. Ironically, he was one of the more than 90 hereditary peers elected to remain in the House of Lords after the House of Lords Act 1999. He criticised the decision by the Blair government to abolish the Lord Chancellor, stating Blair was: "playing Pooh sticks with 800 years of history." He supported a majority-elected upper house. He opposed the Fixed-term Parliaments Act 2011.

He was a member of the Joint Committee on Human Rights from July 2005 until his death, in which capacity he strongly criticised Jacqui Smith over the government's proposed extension to the detention of terror suspects to 42 days. He disapproved of modernising tendencies within the Church of England, stating on one occasion that "...one hundred years ago, the Church was in favour of fox hunting and against buggery. Now it is in favour of buggery and against fox hunting." On two occasions he appeared on Have I Got News for You in November 1999 and October 2003 respectively. He is the only hereditary peer to have ever appeared on that programme to date.

== Death ==
Onslow died on 14 May 2011, aged 73, from cancer.

== Family ==
In 1964, Onslow married Robin Lindsay Bullard, daughter of Robert Lee Bullard III, of Atlanta, Georgia, and Ann Lindsay Bullard (née Aymer), who in 1949 married Charles McLaren, 3rd Baron Aberconway.

Onslow and his wife had three children, including Rupert Charles William Bullard Onslow, 8th Earl of Onslow.

In 2011 his daughter's wedding was accelerated so that the dying Onslow would be able to attend.

Peerage of the United Kingdom
Preceded by William Onslow	Earl of Onslow; 1971–2011; Member of the House of Lords (1971–1999)	Succeeded by Rupert Onslow
Peerage of Great Britain
Preceded by William Onslow	Baron Cranley; 1971–2011	Succeeded by Rupert Onslow
Preceded by William Onslow	Baron Onslow; 1971–2011	Succeeded by Rupert Onslow
Parliament of the United Kingdom
New office created by the House of Lords Act 1999	Elected hereditary peer to the House of Lords under the House of Lords Act 1999; 1999–2011	Succeeded by The Lord Ashton of Hyde
