= Robert Wroth (Guildford MP) =

General Robert Wroth (27 August 1660 –4 February 1720) was a British Army officer and politician who sat in the English and British House of Commons between 1705 and 1720.

Wroth was the son of Sir Henry Wroth of Durants, Enfield, Middlesex and joined the British Army in 1685, rising to the rank of Major-general in 1710.

He sat as the Member of Parliament (MP) for the borough of Guildford in Surrey for three separate terms. He held the seat from 1705 to 1708, and from October 1710 until his election was overturned on petition in February 1711. He was reelected unopposed at a by-election in 1717 and held the seat until his death in 1720.

He held public offices for life as a Clerk of the Green Cloth (from 1715) and a Clerk of the Household (by 1716).

He owned the manor of Worplesdon, three miles (5 km) north of Guildford. He married Knightly, the daughter of Humphrey Wyrley, of Hamstead, Staffordshire and had 2 sons and 3 daughters.

Parliament of England
| Preceded by Morgan Randyll; Denzil Onslow | Member of Parliament for Guildford; 1705–1708; With: Denzil Onslow | Succeeded by Morgan Randyll; Denzil Onslow |
Parliament of Great Britain
| Preceded by Morgan Randyll; Denzil Onslow | Member of Parliament for Guildford; 1710–1711; With: Denzil Onslow | Succeeded by Morgan Randyll; Denzil Onslow |
| Preceded by Denzil Onslow; Morgan Randyll | Member of Parliament for Guildford; 1717–1720; With: Morgan Randyll | Succeeded by Arthur Onslow; Morgan Randyll |
