= Richard Munden (British Army officer) =

British Army general

Brigadier-General Richard Munden
- Born: c. 25 June 1680
- Died: 19 December 1725; Dublin, Ireland

Richard Munden (c. 25 June 1680 – 19 December 1725) was a British Army officer and politician who sat in the House of Commons from 1708 to 1710. He served in the War of Spanish Succession and in the Jacobite rising of 1715.

== Early life ==
Munden was the posthumous son of Sir Richard Munden of Bromley St Leonard's, a captain in the Royal Navy, and his wife Susanna Gore. He broke with the family's naval tradition and was commissioned as a captain in the 1st Foot Guards in 1702. He served at the Battle of Blenheim in 1704, and after obtaining promotion to colonel in 1706, he fought later that year at the Battle of Ramillies. In 1708, he was given his own regiment.

== Career ==
In the spring of 1708, Munden was ordered with his troops to England and at the 1708 British general election he was returned as Member of Parliament for Camelford. He was absent from Parliament on military service for much of the time and he did not stand at the 1710 British general election.

Munden was taken prisoner at the Battle of Brihuega in December 1710, and remained in Spain until the peace negotiations. Although promoted to brigadier-general in 1712, his regiment was disbanded and he was placed on half-pay in that year. In 1715 he raised a regiment of horse and became colonel of the 13th Light Dragoons. He fought at the Battle of Preston against the Jacobite rebels. In 1716, he received arrears for his service in the Iberian Peninsula and was placed on the general staff of the Irish establishment. He served from 1722 as Colonel of the 8th Dragoons from 1722 and took part in the funeral procession of the Duke of Marlborough in August 1722.

== Death and legacy ==
Munder died in service in Dublin, on 19 September 1725.

Parliament of Great Britain
Preceded by William Pole	Member of Parliament for Camelford; 1708–1710; With: John Manley	Succeeded by Bernard Granville; Jasper Radcliffe
Military offices
Preceded by The Lord Lansdowne	Governor of Pendennis Castle; 1714–1725	Succeeded by John Hobart
New regiment	Colonel of Munden's Regiment of Dragoons; 1715–1722	Succeeded by Sir Robert Rich
Preceded by Phineas Bowles	Colonel of Munden's Regiment of Dragoons; 1722–1725	Succeeded by Sir Robert Rich
Political offices
Preceded by Denzil Onslow	Out-Ranger of Windsor Forest; 1721–1725	Succeeded by Hon. John King
