= Rupert Onslow, 8th Earl of Onslow =

British noble and hereditary peer (born 1967)

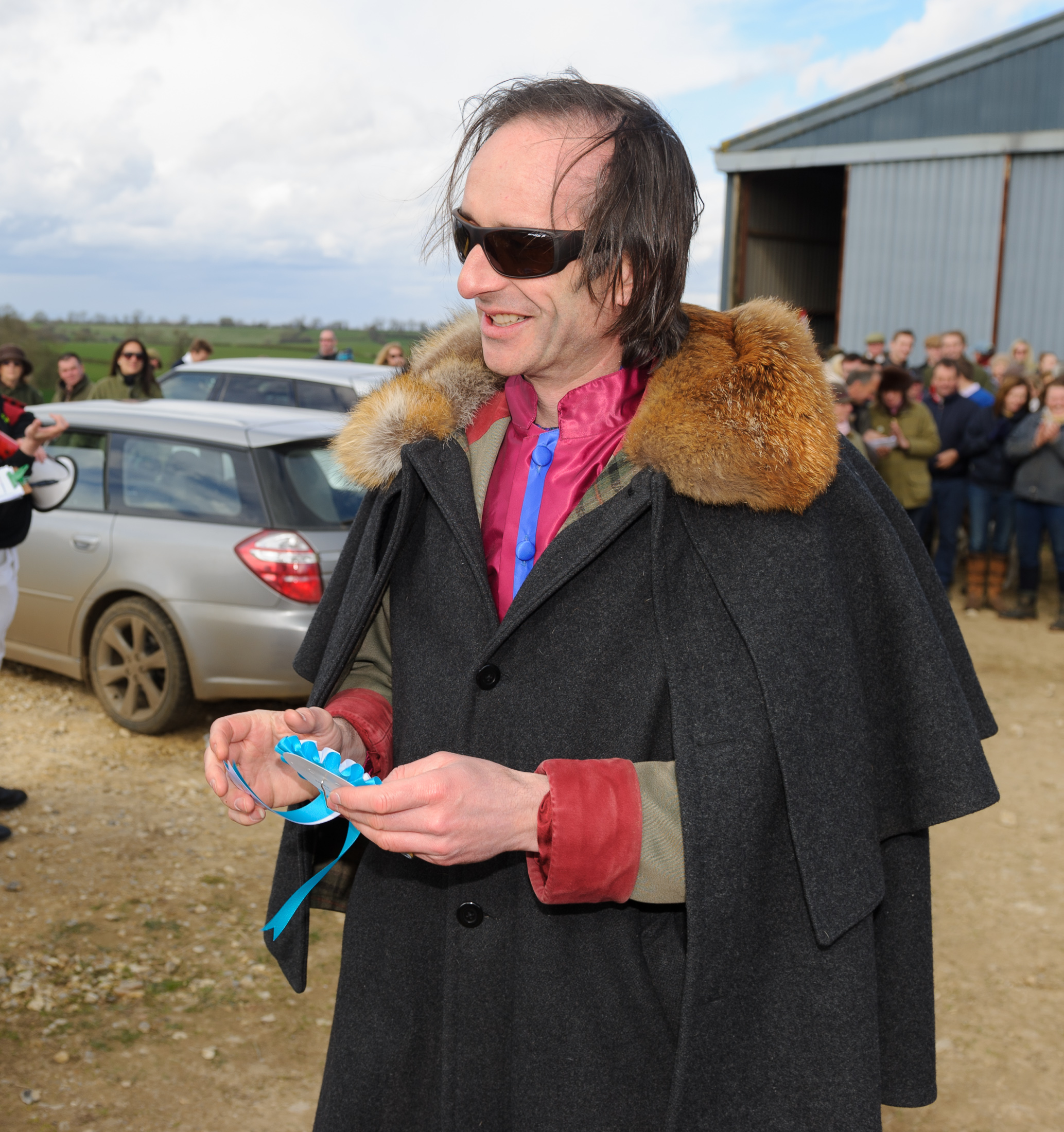
Rupert, Earl of Onslow, after competing in the Harborough Ride

Rupert Charles William Bullard Onslow, 8th Earl of Onslow (born 16 June 1967), known as Viscount Cranley from 1971 to 2011, is a British hereditary peer.

== Biography ==
The son of Michael Onslow, 7th Earl of Onslow, and Robin, Countess of Onslow, the young Onslow was educated at Eton, Western Kentucky University, and King's College London, where he graduated with a BA degree in 1990.

On 10 September 1999, as Viscount Cranley, Onslow married Leigh Jones-Fenleigh, a former pupil of Cheltenham Ladies' College. They have one daughter.

Onslow became the 8th Earl of Onslow on the death of his father Michael Onslow, 7th Earl of Onslow, in 2011.

Lord Onslow lives at and owns and manages the Clandon Park estate in Surrey. In April 2015, the National Trust-owned Clandon Park House burned down, and in that year Onslow said that he wanted the building left as a shell and for the insurance money to be spent on Wentworth Woodhouse, which needed assistance. However Marcus Binney of Save Britain's Heritage disagreed, saying "It would be a terrible waste to leave it as a ruin. As for spending the money elsewhere, you'll be very lucky if the Government don't snaffle it to rebuild the Houses of Parliament". By 2017, Onslow was still disputing the National Trust's plans to develop the ruin as a visitor centre, saying that "the trust would be better off spending the insurance money on buying and preserving another endangered property".

Onslow specialises in insuring fine art; he is the Fine Art Underwriter at the Channel Syndicate in Lloyd's of London. His leisure activities are riding, photography, and shooting.

== Names ==
- 1967–1971 – The Honourable Rupert Onslow
- 1971–2011 – Viscount Cranley
- 2011–present – The Right Honourable the Earl of Onslow

Peerage of Great Britain
Preceded by Michael Onslow	Baron Cranley; 2011–	Incumbent; Heir presumptive: Anthony Onslow
Preceded by Michael Onslow	Baron Onslow; 2011–	Incumbent; Heir presumptive: Anthony Onslow
Peerage of the United Kingdom
Preceded by Michael Onslow	Earl of Onslow; 2011–	Incumbent; Heir presumptive: Anthony Onslow
