= William Bromley (speaker) =

English politician (1663–1732)

The Right Honourable William Bromley
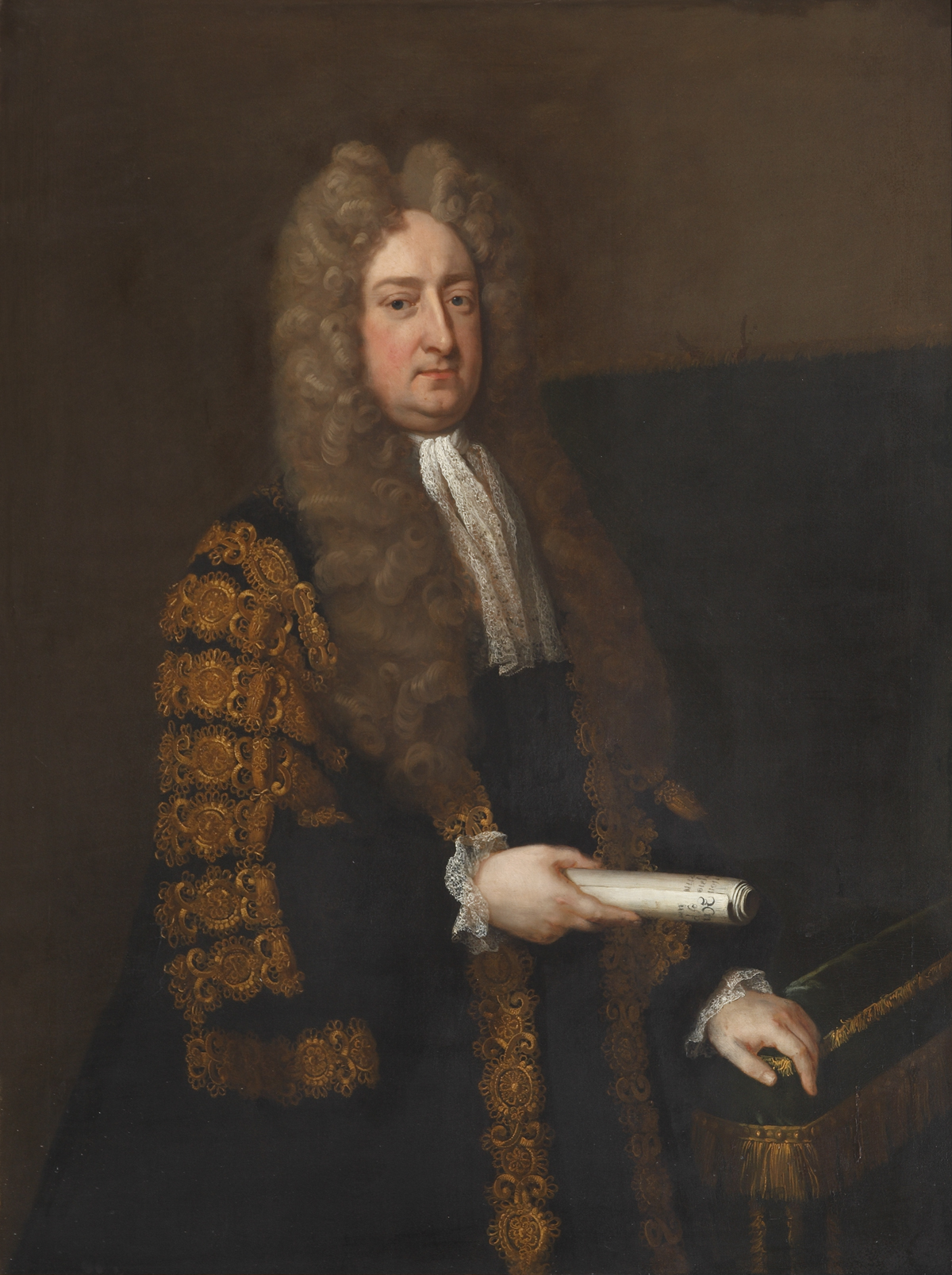
- Portrait by Michael Dahl

Speaker of the House of Commons of Great Britain
- In office 1710–1713
- Preceded by: Richard Onslow
- Succeeded by: Sir Thomas Hanmer

Secretary of State for the Northern Department
- In office 17 August 1713 – September 1714
- Preceded by: The Viscount Bolingbroke
- Succeeded by: The Viscount Townshend

Personal details
- Born: 1663 Warwickshire
- Died: 13 February 1732 (aged 68–69)
- Parents: Sir William Bromley (father); Hon. Ursula Bromley (mother)

William Bromley (1663 – 13 February 1732) of Baginton, Warwickshire, was an English Tory politician who sat in the English and British House of Commons between 1690 and 1732. He was Speaker of the House of Commons of Great Britain from 1710 to 1713 and Secretary of State for the Northern Department from 1713 to 1714.

Bromley was a Hanoverian Tory who supported the Hanoverian Succession in 1714.

== Early life ==
Bromley was the son of Sir William Bromley (died 1682) of Baginton, and his wife Ursula Leigh, daughter of Thomas Leigh, 1st Baron Leigh of Stoneleigh, Warwickshire. He was born at the family seat at Baginton, Warwickshire, and was baptized on 31 August 1663.

He matriculated at Christ Church, Oxford in 1679, and graduated B.A. in 1681 (he was later awarded a D.C.L. in 1702). In 1683, he was admitted as a student of the Middle Temple.

== Political career ==
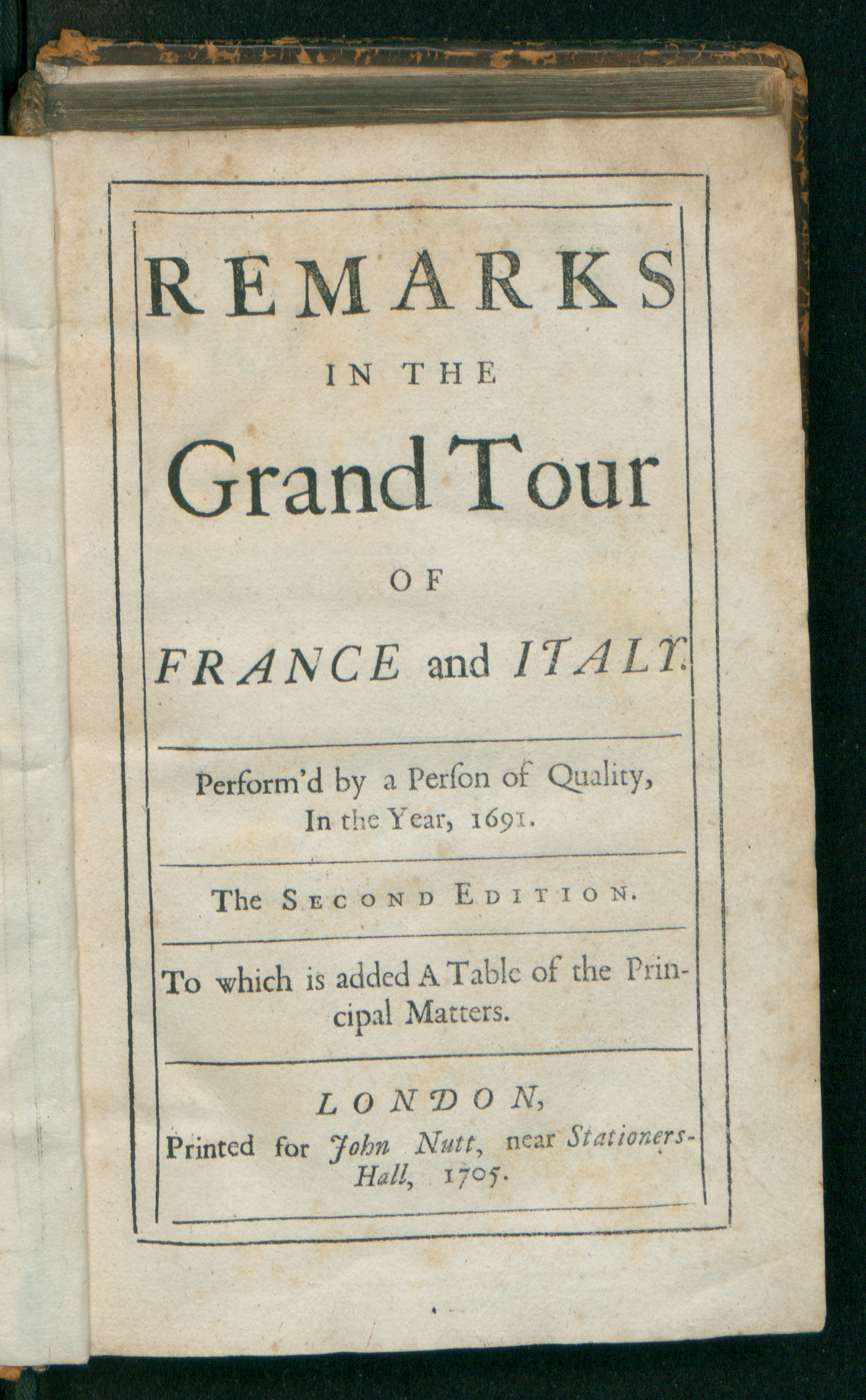
Remarks in the Grand Tour of France and Italy, 1705

Bromley missed the Glorious Revolution because he was travelling in France and Italy in 1688, following the death of his first wife in 1688 (he eventually married four times). Upon his return to England he embarked on a political career. Throughout his time in public life Bromley was a staunch high church Tory with a reputation for honesty and extreme partisanship. His political rivals sometimes found it useful to allege Jacobite sympathies and to refer to Bromley's travel memoirs Remarks on the Grand Tour of France and Italy to support that allegation.

At the 1690 English general election Bromley was returned as knight of the shire (MP) for Warwickshire. An able debater, his reputation rose rapidly; particularly amongst the Tory squires who shared similar prejudices. In 1696 Bromley refused to take an oath to swear that William III was the rightful and lawful King. As a result, he was incapacitated from serving in Parliament and was not re-elected for Warwickshire in 1698.

Bromley returned to Parliament for the strongly High Tory constituency of Oxford University, at a by-election in March 1701, after which Bromley was a leading figure in the Tory ranks. He continued to hold one of the university's two seats for the rest of his life.

Bromley was a strong opponent of occasional conformity by religious dissenters, who attended Church of England services often enough to avoid the legal penalties imposed by the Test and Corporation Acts. Bromley promoted several bills to strengthen the law, but they were not adopted.

From 1702 to 1705 Bromley was the Chairman of the Committee of Privileges and Elections of the House of Commons. In 1705 he was a candidate for the Speakership. On this occasion a new edition of Bromley's travel memoirs was produced by his political enemies (with an added table pointing the reader to the alleged pro-Catholic and Jacobite passages in the book). Bromley did not become Speaker in 1705.

Following the 1710 election there was a large Tory majority in the House of Commons. On 25 November 1710 Bromley was elected Speaker, without opposition. He was sworn in as a member of the Privy Council in 1711.

In his position as Speaker in 1713, Bromley responded to questions from a Scottish MP with the infamous reply that "they had catcht hold of Scotland, they wou'd keep her fast.", thereby given credence to the widely held belief in Scotland that Union was a means for England to assert her dominance over Scotland. Lockhart Papers

In 1713 Bromley left the chair of the House to join the administration as Secretary of State for the Northern Department. He lost that office in 1714, when the new King George I installed a Whig ministry. Bromley never held government office again, but he remained the generally recognised leading Tory in the House of Commons until his health declined in the 1720s. Bromley remained an MP until his death in 1732.

He remained a strong supporter of Robert Harley, during his impeachment trial from 1715 to 1717.

== Family ==
Bromley was married four times:

1. Catherine Cloberry, daughter of Sir John Cloberry MP. They had one son:
  - Clobery Bromley MP (1685–1711)
2. Trever Fortrey, daughter of Samuel Fortrey, on 21 November 1689. They had no children.
3. Cecilia Swan, daughter of Sir William Swan, 1st Bt. They had one son.
4. Elizabeth Stawell, daughter of Ralph Stawell, 1st Baron Stawell, on 12 January 1698. They had two sons and two daughters:
  - Thomas Bromley (died 1716), of Christ Church, Oxford and the Inner Temple, M.A. at Oxford 1716
  - William Bromley MP (died 1737)
  - Elizabeth Bromley (died 1742)
  - Anne Bromley

== Arms ==
Coat of arms of William Bromley
Crest Out of a ducal coronet Or a demi-lion Argent supporting a banner Gules charged with a lion passant Gold staff of the last (the standard of Guiénne). Escutcheon Quarterly per fess indented Gules and Or an escutcheon Argent charged with a griffin segreant Vert

Political offices
Preceded by Richard Onslow	Speaker of the House of Commons of Great Britain; 1710–1713	Succeeded by Sir Thomas Hanmer, Bt
Preceded by Henry St John, 1st Viscount Bolingbroke	Secretary of State for the Northern Department; 1713–1714	Succeeded by Charles Townshend, 2nd Viscount Townshend
Parliament of England
Preceded by Sir Richard Newdigate, Bt; Sir Richard Verney	Member of Parliament for Warwickshire; 1690–1698; With: Andrew Archer	Succeeded by Sir John Mordaunt, Bt; Sir Charles Shuckburgh, Bt
Preceded by Sir Heneage Finch; Sir Christopher Musgrave	Member of Parliament for Oxford University; 1701–1707; With: Sir Heneage Finch, 1701–1703; Sir William Whitelock, 1703–1707	Succeeded by Parliament of Great Britain
Parliament of Great Britain
Preceded by Parliament of England	Member of Parliament for Oxford University; 1707–1732; With: Sir William Whitelock 1707–1717; George Clarke 1717–1732	Succeeded by George Clarke; Viscount Cornbury
