= Ambrose Browne =

English politician

Ambrose Browne (11 January 1659 - July 1688) was an English politician who sat in the House of Commons from 1685 to 1688.

Browne was the son of Sir Adam Browne, 2nd Baronet of Betchworth Castle, Surrey and his wife Philippa Cooper, daughter of Sir John Cooper, Bt of Winbourn St Giles, Dorset. His father was MP for Surrey. He was educated at Trinity College, Oxford and was commissioner for assessment for Surrey from 1673 to 1680. At a contested election in 1685, Browne was elected Member of Parliament for Bletchingley. He became a gentleman of the privy chamber and captain in the Earl of Plymouth's horse at the time of Monmouth's rebellion. He opposed the king's religious policy and was cashiered in March 1687.

Browne died in 1688 and was buried at Dorking on 24 July. He predeceased his father and the baronetcy became extinct.
