= Earl of Onslow =

Earldom in the Peerage of the United Kingdom

- Arms of Onslow: Argent, a Fess Gules, between six Cornish Choughs proper. Crest: An Eagle Sable, preying on a Partridge proper. Supporters: Dexter: On either side a Falcon close proper, belled Or.
- Creation date: 19 June 1801
- Created by: King George III
- Peerage: Peerage of the United Kingdom
- First holder: George Onslow, 1st Earl of Onslow
- Present holder: Rupert Onslow, 8th Earl of Onslow
- Heir presumptive: Anthony Onslow
- Subsidiary titles: Viscount Cranley; Baron Onslow; Baron Cranley; Baronet ‘of West Clandon’
- Status: Extant
- Motto: Festina Lente ("Be quick without impetuosity" lit. "Hurry slowly")

Earl of Onslow, of Onslow in the County of Shropshire and of Clandon Park in the County of Surrey, is a title in the Peerage of the United Kingdom. It was created in 1801 for George Onslow, 4th Baron Onslow.

== History ==
The Onslow family descends from Arthur Onslow, who represented Bramber, Sussex and Guildford in the House of Commons. He was married to Mary, the daughter of Thomas Foote, who served as Lord Mayor of London in 1649, and had been created a baronet in 1660 (a title which became extinct on his death in 1687). In 1674, Onslow himself was created a baronet in the Baronetage of England, with the precedence of 1660.

Onslow was succeeded by his son, the second Baronet, who was a prominent politician and served as Speaker of the House of Commons from 1708 to 1710 and as Chancellor of the Exchequer from 1713 to 1714. In 1716, he was raised to the Peerage of Great Britain as Baron Onslow, of Onslow in the County of Shropshire and of Clandon Park in the County of Surrey, with remainder, failing male issue of his own, to his uncle Denzil Onslow, and afterwards, to the male heirs of his father. Lord Onslow was succeeded by his son, the second Baron. He sat as Member of Parliament for Gatton, Chichester, Bletchingley and Surrey and served as Lord Lieutenant of Surrey. His son, the third Baron, represented Guildford in Parliament and served as Lord Lieutenant of Surrey. He was heirless on his death in 1776.

Lord Onslow was succeeded according to the special remainder by his second cousin and heir male of his great-grandfather, who became the fourth Baron. He was the son of Arthur Onslow, Speaker of the House of Commons, elder son of Foot Onslow. He was a Member of Parliament for Rye and Surrey and notably served as Treasurer of the Household and as Lord Lieutenant of Surrey. In May 1776, five months before succeeding in the barony of Onslow, he was raised to the Peerage of Great Britain in his own right as Baron Cranley, of Imber Court in the County of Surrey. In 1801, he was further honoured when he was made Viscount Cranley, of Cranley in the County of Surrey, and Earl of Onslow, of Onslow in the County of Shropshire. The latter titles were in the Peerage of the United Kingdom. A grandson, André George Louis Onslow (1784–1853), was a noted composer, and author of thirty string quartets and other works.

His son, the second Earl, represented Rye and Guildford in the House of Commons and was succeeded by his eldest son, the third Earl. He died without surviving male issue and was succeeded by his great-nephew, the fourth Earl. He was the son of George Augustus Cranley Onslow, son of Thomas Cranley Onslow, second son of the second Earl. Lord Onslow was a prominent Conservative politician, serving as Under-Secretary of State for the Colonies, as Under-Secretary of State for India, and as President of the Board of Agriculture and Governor of New Zealand. His eldest son, the fifth Earl, was also a Conservative politician; he notably served as Under-Secretary of State for War and as Paymaster General during the 1920s.

He was succeeded by his son, the sixth Earl, who served in the Conservative administrations of Winston Churchill, Anthony Eden and Harold Macmillan as Captain of the Yeomen of the Guard (Deputy Chief Whip in the House of Lords) for nine years. From 1971 to 2011, the titles were held by his son, the seventh Earl, who succeeded in 1971. The seventh Earl was one of the ninety elected hereditary peers who remained in the House of Lords after the passing of the House of Lords Act 1999 and sat, like his ancestors, on the Conservative benches. He is also the only hereditary peer to have appeared as a panellist on Have I Got News For You. Upon his death on 14 May 2011, he was succeeded by his son, now the eighth Earl, who inherited Clandon Park, the 1000-acre agricultural Parkland Estate in Surrey in January 2017.

Another member of the Onslow family was the Conservative politician Cranley Onslow. He was a descendant of George Onslow, eldest son of Lieutenant-General Richard Onslow, nephew of the first Baron and uncle of the first Earl. Also, Admiral Sir Richard Onslow, 1st Baronet, was the second son of Lieutenant-General Richard Onslow. See Onslow baronets of Althain for more information on this branch of the family.

The family seat of the Earls of Onslow is Clandon Park in Surrey. Although Clandon House and gardens were gifted and endowed by the Onslow family to the National Trust in 1955, the surrounding agricultural estate called Clandon Park, covering over 1,000 acres and including areas of Grade II-listed parkland, remains in the ownership of The Earl and Countess of Onslow.

The eighth Earl married Leigh Jones-Fenleigh, at Oakham on 10 September 1999 and they have one daughter.

The family's coat of arms is: Argent a fess gules between six Cornish choughs proper. The supporters are two falcons, proper, belled or. The crest is made up of an eagle sable preying on a partridge or. The motto is "FESTINA LENTE" (Latin: Make haste slowly), although "SEMPER FIDELIS" (Always faithful) is also used. The coat of arms is the basis of the badge of Onslow St Audreys School in Hatfield, Hertfordshire.

== Onslow baronets (1674) ==
- Sir Arthur Onslow, 1st Baronet (1622–1688)
- Sir Richard Onslow, 2nd Baronet (1654–1717) (created Baron Onslow in 1716)

=== Baron Onslow (1716) ===
Title passing from father to son, except where noted.

- Richard Onslow, 1st Baron Onslow (1654–1717)
- Thomas Onslow, 2nd Baron Onslow (1679–1740)
- Richard Onslow, 3rd Baron Onslow (1715–1776)
- George Onslow, 4th Baron Onslow (1731–1814) (created Baron Cranley in 1776 and Earl of Onslow in 1801), second cousin of the 3rd Baron

=== Earl of Onslow (1801) ===
Title passing from father to son, except where noted.

- George Onslow, 1st Earl of Onslow (1731–1814)
- Thomas Onslow, 2nd Earl of Onslow (1754–1827)
- Arthur George Onslow, 3rd Earl of Onslow (1777–1870)
  - Arthur George Onslow, Viscount Cranley (1820–1856)
- William Hillier Onslow, 4th Earl of Onslow (1853–1911), great-nephew of the 3rd Earl
- Richard William Alan Onslow, 5th Earl of Onslow (1876–1945)
- William Arthur Bampfylde Onslow, 6th Earl of Onslow (1913–1971)
- Michael William Copelstone Dillon Onslow, 7th Earl of Onslow (1938–2011)
- Rupert Charles William Bullard Onslow, 8th Earl of Onslow (born 1967)

The heir presumptive is his father's fourth cousin, Anthony Ernest Edward Onslow (born 1955), a descendant of the 2nd Earl.

=== Title succession chart ===
Title succession chart, Onslow baronets, Barons Onslow, Barons Cranley, and Earls of Onslow.

Sir Arthur Onslow; 1st Baronet; 1622–1688
Baron Onslow
Richard Onslow; 1st Baron Onslow; 2nd Baronet; 1654–1717 | Foot Onslow; 1655–1710
Thomas Onslow; 2nd Baron Onslow; 1679–1740 | Rt Hon. Arthur Onslow; 1691–1768
Baron Cranley; Earl of Onslow
Richard Onslow; 3rd Baron Onslow; 4th Baronet; 1715–1776 | George Onslow; 1st Earl of Onslow; 4th Baron Onslow; 1st Baron Cranley; 5th Baronet; 1731–1814
Thomas Onslow; 2nd Earl of Onslow; 1754–1827
Arthur Onslow; 3rd Earl of Onslow; 1777–1870 | Hon. Thomas Onslow; 1778–1861
Arthur Onslow; Viscount Cranley; 1820–1856 | George Onslow; 1813–1855 | Guildford Mainwaring- Ellerker-Onslow; 1814–1882 | Lt Col. Arthur Onslow; 1815–1897
William Onslow; 4th Earl of Onslow; 1853–1911 | Charles Mainwaring- Ellerker-Onslow; 1848–1927 | Arthur D. Onslow; 1856–1920 | Arthur E. Onslow; 1862–1927
Richard Onslow; 5th Earl of Onslow; 1876–1945 | Hon. Victor Onslow; 1890–1922 | Arthur Mainwaring- Ellerker-Onslow; 1888–1943 | Vivian Onslow; 1888–1979
William Onslow; 6th Earl of Onslow; 1913–1971 | Arthur Onslow; 1920–1997
Michael Onslow; 7th Earl of Onslow; 1938–2011 | Robert Onslow; 1952–1990 | Anthony Onslow born 1955
Rupert Onslow; 8th Earl of Onslow born 1967

=== Line of succession ===
Line of succession
- Sir Arthur Onslow, 1st Baronet (1622–1688)
  - Richard Onslow, 1st Baron Onslow (1654–1717)
    - Thomas Onslow, 2nd Baron Onslow (1679–1740)
      - Richard Onslow, 3rd Baron Onslow (1715–1776)
  - Foot Onslow (1655–1710)
    - Arthur Onslow (1691–1768)
      - George Onslow, 1st Earl of Onslow (1731–1814)
        - Thomas Onslow, 2nd Earl of Onslow (1754–1827)
          - Arthur George Onslow, 3rd Earl of Onslow (1777–1870)
            - Arthur George Onslow, Viscount Cranley (1820–1856)
          - Thomas Cranley Onslow (1778–1861)
            - George Augustus Cranley Onslow (1813–1855)
              - William Hillier Onslow, 4th Earl of Onslow (1853–1911)
                - Richard William Alan Onslow, 5th Earl of Onslow (1876–1945)
                  - William Arthur Bampfylde Onslow, 6th Earl of Onslow (1913–1971)
                    - Michael William Coplestone Dillon Onslow, 7th Earl of Onslow (1938–2011)
                      - Rupert Charles William Bullard Onslow, 8th Earl of Onslow (born 1967)
            - Lt Col. Arthur Edward Onslow (1815–1897)
              - Arthur Edward Onslow (1862–1927)
                - Vivian Isidore Onslow (1888–1979)
                  - Arthur Charles Vivian Onslow (1920–1997)
                    - (1) Anthony Ernest Edward Onslow (b. 1955)
                    - (2) David Peter Onslow (b. 1959)
                  - Denzil Isidore Charles Onslow (1924–2003)
                    - (3) John M. Onslow (b. 1948)
                      - (4) Stuart John Onslow (b. 1977)
                    - (5) Dennis Raymond Onslow (b. 1949)
                    - (6) Andrew Martin Onslow (b. 1954)
                      - (7) Martin Andrew Onslow (b. 1983)
                      - (8) Matthew John Onslow (b. 1984)
                    - (9) Brian S. Onslow (b. 1957)
                      - (10) Neil Ian Onslow (b. 1984)

== See also ==
- Onslow baronets
