= Wanborough Manor =

Manor house in Wanborough, Surrey, England

Coordinates: 51.2319°N 0.6623°W

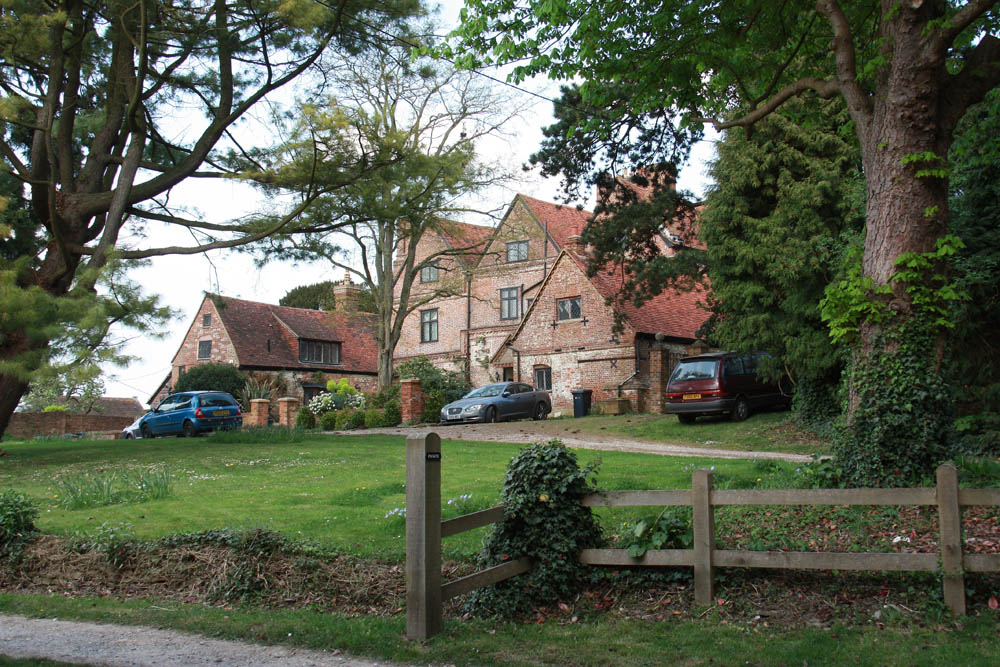
Wanborough Manor

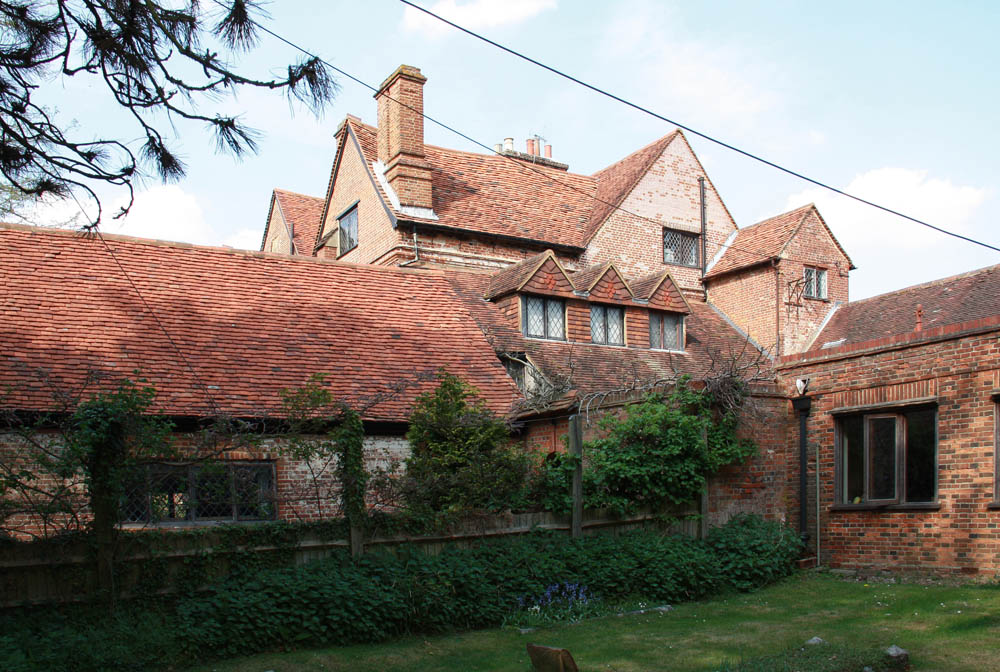
Wanborough Manor

Wanborough Manor is an Elizabethan manor house on the Hog's Back in Wanborough in the Borough of Guildford, Surrey. During World War II the manor house was requisitioned by the Special Operations Executive (SOE) to train secret agents and was known as Special Training School 5 (there were six in total across the UK) and later returned to private ownership.

== History ==
=== 1500s to 1945 ===
The house dates to the 16th century, but was considerably extended by builders of Thomas Dalmahoy, co-MP for Guildford who died in 1682. Through his marriage to the widowed Duchess of Hamilton, the heiress of the Earl of Dirletoun (note: the Hamilton estates were sequestered and partly passed to her daughters), he owned this manor and the former grand house and private park (now public park) known as The Friary in Guildford.

Sir Algernon West, principal private secretary to prime minister William Gladstone, lived at the house when it was visited by Queen Victoria, who planted a tree in the grounds. Sir Algernon ensured the planning and building of Wanborough railway station took place on the Guildford to Reading line.

The manor was visited by Otto von Bismarck and Gladstone held cabinet meetings here whilst in his second period of Prime Minister. The Liberal H. H. Asquith leased the manor house until he became Prime Minister (1908–1916).

=== Wartime activities ===
The SOE training establishment STS5 was run by Major Roger de Wesselow, a Coldstream Guards officer. The first intake of SOE trainees occurred in February 1941 and enrolment continued until March 1943 when new selection procedures were established at Winterfold House, near Cranleigh. Its primary use during the war was to whittle out those not suited to undercover work and begin initial training for those that progressed.

Following initial interviews of potential agents in London, recruits were sent to Wanborough Manor for a three- or four-week period. During this time they were trained in the skills required to work as undercover agents including unarmed combat and the art of silent killing. Successful trainees were also kitted out with the necessary clothes and identity documents. They also received the latest information on what was happening in France and if necessary their French was improved.

The Anglo-French author, Noreen Riols — then a teenager — who had been a student at the French School or Lycée was amongst those sent to Wanborough to provide vital training and vetting.

For those that successfully passed the four-week training at Wanborough, further training on using arms and explosives would take place at Arisaig House in Inverness-shire. Agents requiring further intensive training (for example, radio operators went on to further training establishments. Lastly, they would receive parachute training.

Peter Churchill recalls in his book Of Their Own Choice his three-part training at Wanborough which included firearms training, undertaking sabotage with explosives, map reading and communicating via Morse code.

SOE's ‘F’ Section (French) drew a large number of agents from this establishment – approximately 400 British agents were sent to France of which 130 were trained at Wanborough, and of these 50 failed to return including twelve women.

Evidence of the secret training sessions remains in the grounds of the manor: a bullet-riddled wall, as well as holes used for testing explosives.

=== SOE agents trained at Wanborough Manor ===
This is an incomplete list:

- Noël Burdeyron
- Peter Churchill
- Yvonne Cormeau
- Benjamin Cowburn
- Dennis Rake
- Noor Inayat Khan
- Peggy Knight
- Bob Maloubier
- Harry Peulevé
- Diana Rowden
- Pierre de Vomécourt
- Violet Szabo
- Francois Michel William Reeve
- Jack Evans
- Tony Brooks

== Wanborough Church plaque ==
A plaque in Wanborough Church commemorates those agents trained at Wanborough Manor that lost their lives. Diana Rowden, who trained at Wanborough and who operated in France under the codename Paulette was captured and executed in 1943 after four months under cover. There is a memorial to her at Tilford Church.
