= Edward Evelyn (politician) =

British politician

Sir Edward Evelyn, 1st Baronet DL (25 January 1626 – 3 May 1692) was an English Tory Member of Parliament who served in a number of local offices in Surrey and found favour under James II of England. Removed from several local offices at the close of the latter's reign, he was largely replaced in them by William III and Mary II and appointed a gentleman of the privy chamber. He died a few years later, dividing his property among the three daughters who survived him.

== Early life and family ==
Evelyn was the fifth son of Sir Thomas Evelyn (d. 1659) and his wife Anne Gold, the daughter of a London Grocer. From his parents, he inherited the two manors of Long Ditton, and the manors of Talworth and Claygate, Surrey. He was apprenticed to a grocer in 1643, and paid a small fine in 1651 for 'delinquency' during the English Civil War.

His four elder brothers having died in his father's lifetime, he succeeded his father in 1659. On 15 September of that year, he married Mary Balam (d. 1696), by whom he had three son and six daughters:

- Ann Evelyn (26 March 1661 – 1685), married William Hill of Teddington in 1682 and had issue
- Mary Evelyn (b. 14 July 1662), married Sir William Glynne, 2nd Baronet, in 1688
- George Evelyn (1663 – 13 September 1685)
- Jane Evelyn (b. and d. January 1665)
- Edward Evelyn (12 June 1667 – August 1669)
- Elizabeth Evelyn (1668/9 – September 1669)
- Charles Evelyn (15 August 1670 – October 1670)
- Penelope Evelyn (3 October 1672 – June 1714), married Sir Joseph Alston, 3rd Baronet, in 1690 and had issue
- Sophia Evelyn (1 March 1676 – 8 January 1739), married Sir Stephen Glynne, 3rd Baronet, after 1692 and had issue

== Political activity ==
He was proposed to be a Knight of the Royal Oak at the English Restoration, enjoying at the time an income of £600 per year. In March 1660, he was named to the commission of the peace in Surrey, and in September a commissioner for assessment, an office he held until 1680. He was also appointed as a Surrey commissioner for loyal and indigent officers in 1662 and to the commission on recusants in 1675.

His cousin John Evelyn described him in 1685 as "an honest gentleman, much in favour with his Majesty", and marks of the royal favour were apparent: Edward was knighted at Worcester Park, Surrey, on 13 September 1676, created a baronet on 13 February 1683 and made a deputy lieutenant of the county in the same year.

In 1685, Evelyn stood for Parliament for Surrey with Sir Adam Browne as a Court or Tory candidate, against the Whig incumbents, his cousin George Evelyn and Arthur Onslow. While the Whigs seemed likely to prevail, the Sheriff of Surrey, Samuel Lewin, as returning officer, had the election adjourned to the small village of Leatherhead. An afternoon storm forced many of the Whig electors to take shelter in the surrounding countryside, due to the lack of accommodations in the village, expecting the election to be held the next morning. When they were gone, the Sheriff suddenly called for a poll and returned Sir Edward and Sir Adam. During this year, Evelyn was also named an alderman of Kingston-on-Thames, which had surrendered its old charter and was granted a new one in August.

Sir Edward served on four minor committees during the Loyal Parliament. He probably fell out with James II over religious policy, as he was removed from the Kingston corporation, the commission of the peace, and his deputy lieutenancy in the spring of 1688. In October 1688, on the eve of the Glorious Revolution, he was restored to his deputy lieutenancy, but quickly accepted the new regime. Under William and Mary, he was reappointed to the commission of the peace in November 1688 and the commission for assessment in the same year, and was further honoured with an appointment as a gentleman of the privy chamber. Though restored to most of his offices, he did not stand for Parliament again.

== Death ==
Evelyn died suddenly on 3 May 1692 and was buried at Long Ditton. He left his lands and manors to his wife for life, to be divided after her death among his surviving daughters: the manors of Long Ditton to Penelope, Talworth to Mary, and Claygate to Sophia.

Parliament of England
Preceded by Arthur Onslow; George Evelyn	Member of Parliament for Surrey; 1685–1687; With: Sir Adam Browne	Succeeded by Sir Richard Onslow; George Evelyn
Baronetage of England
New creation	Baronet (of Long Ditton); 1683–1692	Extinct
