= Richard Onslow (Parliamentarian) =

English politician (1601–1664)

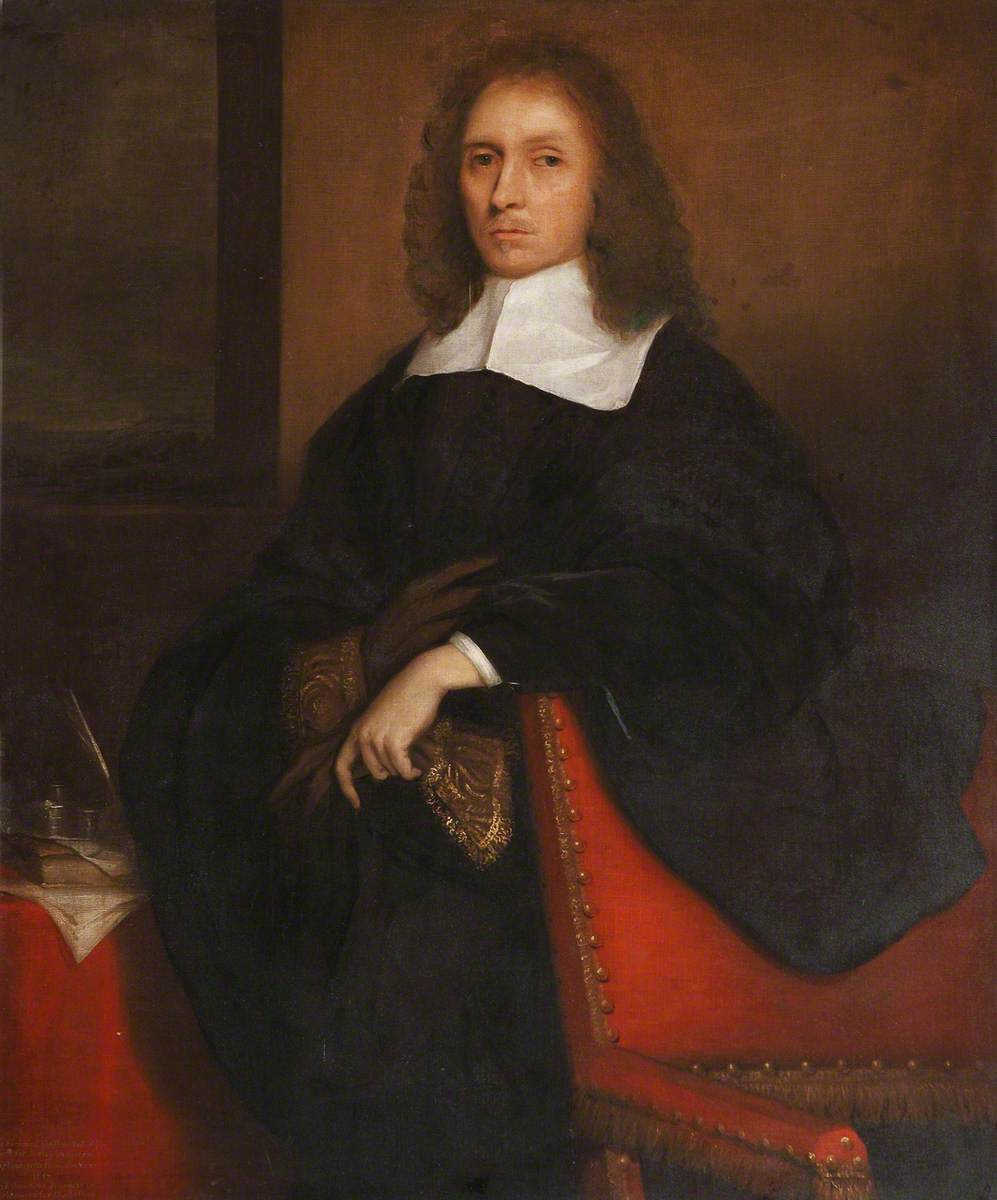
Sir Richard Onslow, 1650s portrait

Sir Richard Onslow (1601 – 19 May 1664) was an English politician who sat in the House of Commons at various times between 1628 and 1664. He fought on the Parliamentary side during the English Civil War. He was the grandson of one Speaker of the House of Commons and the grandfather of another, both also called Richard Onslow.

== Life ==
=== Young life ===
Onslow was the younger son of Sir Edward Onslow of Knowle (in Cranleigh), Surrey, and his wife Isabel (Elizabeth), daughter of Sir Thomas Shirley of Wiston, West Sussex. He was baptized on 30 July 1601. He had an elder brother Thomas (the heir), and three sisters. His father died in 1615, appointing Elizabeth his executrix and residuary legatee. To Richard was bequeathed an annuity of £100 per annum from manors and estates in Gloucestershire.

The manor of Bramley (with lands in Bramley, Shalford, Wonersh and Dunsfold), was left in the hands of overseers to provide annuities for the sisters in their minorities, and then to be sold by them, with an option for Thomas Onslow to purchase for £2000 within three years. On 10 September 1616 Thomas Onslow and his mother settled the manors of Cranleigh, Knowle, Holdhurst and Utworth (lying also in Guildford, Hascombe and Cranleigh) on his intended marriage with Mary daughter of Sir Samuel Lennard. However he died childless in December 1616, possibly before the marriage itself took place. Richard's three sisters, all unmarried at their father's death, proceeded to respectable marriages.

Richard matriculated as a Fellow-Commoner at Jesus College, Cambridge in 1617, and was admitted at Lincoln's Inn in 1618. He married Elizabeth, daughter of Arthur Strangways, produced his first child by 1621, and was knighted on 2 June 1624. In 1628 he was elected Member of Parliament for Surrey, and sat until 1629 when King Charles I began to rule without parliament for eleven years. In 1630 his mother Elizabeth died leaving him all her freehold land and the residue of her estate, and giving a silver chafing-dish to Richard's wife. In November 1638 he was a deputy-lieutenant for the county of Surrey.

=== Civil War period ===
Onslow was elected MP for Surrey in April 1640 for the Short Parliament and in November 1640 for the Long Parliament. In 1642, the lodge in Clandon Park, West Clandon, and the Park itself, formerly enclosed but since disemparked, was sold to him by Sir Richard Weston and was now re-emparked: he purchased Temple House at Merrow, with the advowson of Merrow church, but not the Temple manor.

When the Civil War broke out in 1642, he commanded the Surrey Trained Bands at the start of hostilities, then raised a regiment for Parliament, leading his men at the siege of Basing House in 1644.

Being of moderate views, he was one of the members excluded from Parliament in Pride's Purge in December 1648. In 1650 he recommenced a series of transactions which led much later (1711) to the acquisition of the manor of West Clandon. In 1654, he was elected again MP for Surrey in the First Protectorate Parliament. He was re-elected MP for Surrey in 1656 for the Second Protectorate Parliament. In 1658, he was elevated to Cromwell's new House of Peers.

=== Restoration period ===
He returned to the Commons in April 1660 as MP for Guildford in the Convention Parliament, where he worked closely with his more influential friend Sir Anthony Ashley-Cooper to bring about the Restoration of the Monarchy. He was re-elected MP for Guildford in 1661 for the Cavalier Parliament and sat until his death in 1664. He was elected one of the original Bailiffs to the board of the Bedford Level Corporation in 1663, a position he held briefly until his death.

=== Death ===
His death in 1664 took place in mysterious circumstances at Arundel House in London. It was announced to have been owing to an "ague" which developed into gangrene. However, Lucy Hutchinson, whose husband John Hutchinson had recently been imprisoned as a Regicide, believed Onslow to be her enemy for having denounced her husband in parliament: she is said to have heard that Onslow had been struck by lightning, an allegation widely believed in Onslow's family. He was buried at Cranleigh, Surrey, where his tomb remained until the church restoration of 1845, with that of his wife Elizabeth, who was buried there in 1679 aged 78.

=== Portrait and heraldry ===
The Surrey Visitation of 1623 shows arms for this family as follows, Quarterly of six:
1. Onslow: Argent, a fesse gules between 6 "falcons" sable, belled and armed or.
2. Kynaston: Argent, a lion sable.
3. Frankton: Gules, on a chevron or 3 mullets sable.
4. Bond: Argent, on a chevron sable three bezants.
5. Houghton: Azure, three bars and a canton argent.
6. (blank)
Crest (Onslow): A falcon as in the arms, preying on a partridge or.

The Victoria County History blazons for Onslow: Argent a fesse gules between 6 Cornish choughs.

A portrait of Sir Richard Onslow, painted in the style of Robert Walker, was held by the National Trust at Clandon Park.

== Family ==
Sir Richard Onslow married Elizabeth Strangeways (c. 1601 – 27 August 1679), daughter and heir of Arthur Strangeways. They had 14 children:

- Sir Henry Onslow (1621–c. 1667), married Jane Stidolph and had issue
- Sir Arthur Onslow, 1st Baronet (1622–1688), also MP for Guildford and Surrey
- Elizabeth Onslow (1624 – aft. 1678), married first John Berney of Swardeston and second Sir Francis Wyndham, 3rd Baronet
- Anne Onslow (b. 1626), married Sir Anthony Shirley, 1st Baronet
- Mary Onslow (b. 1638), married Sir George Freeman
- John Onslow (c. January – February 1630^{N.S.})
- Jane Onslow (1631 – 5 May 1729), married Sir George Croke
- Richard Onslow (1632–c. 1712), married Abigail Reynardson, without issue, member of the Worshipful Company of Fishmongers
- Thomas Onslow (1633 – aft. 1664), died unmarried
- Dorothy Onslow (1635–1642)
- Catherine Onslow (1636–1659), married Sir Thomas Cobb, 1st Baronet
- John Onslow (12 September 1636 – April 1663), died unmarried, member of the Inner Temple
- Denzil Onslow (of Pyrford) (c. 1642–1721)
- one other child, died young
