= Sir Arthur Onslow, 1st Baronet =

English politician (1622–1688)

Sir Arthur Onslow, 1st Baronet (1622 – 21 July 1688), was an English politician who sat in the House of Commons at various times between 1641 and 1685.

== Life ==
Onslow was the eldest son of Sir Richard Onslow and was baptised on 23 April 1622. His father was an important Parliamentarian from Surrey during the Civil War. Onslow was educated at Queen's College, Oxford, in 1639 and at Lincoln's Inn in 1640.

In 1641, Onslow was elected Member of Parliament for Bramber in the Long Parliament. He took an active role in political affairs during the English Civil War. In 1654 he was elected MP for Surrey in the First Protectorate Parliament and was re-elected in 1656 for the Second Protectorate Parliament, and in 1659 for the Third Protectorate Parliament. In 1660, he was elected MP for Guildford in the Convention Parliament. He was re-elected MP for Surrey in 1661 for the Cavalier Parliament.

On 8 May 1674, Onslow obtained a patent in reversion to succeed to his father-in-law Thomas Foote's baronetcy upon his death without heirs, with the precedence of the original creation. He became, therefore, a baronet upon Foote's death in 1687, but died less than a year later, and was succeeded by his eldest son Richard.

== Family ==
Onslow's first wife was Rose Stoughton (d. 1647), daughter of Nicholas Stoughton, by whom he had no children. His second wife was Mary Foote, daughter of Sir Thomas Foote, a wealthy London grocer who was created a baronet in 1660. By her he had several children, including:

- Richard (1654–1717), became Baron Onslow, Speaker of the House of Commons (1708–1710), Lord Treasurer, Chancellor of the Exchequer, etc. He married Elizabeth, daughter of Henry Tulse, and had Thomas, 2nd Lord Onslow.
- Foot Onslow (born 1655, died 11 May 1710), who was Commissioner of Excise (1694–1710).
- Arthur, who died unmarried.
- Henry, who died unmarried.
- Mary, who married Sir Robert Reeve, 2nd Baronet of Thwaite.
- Catherine Onslow (d. 14 March 1731), married Sir William Clerke, 3rd Baronet of Hitcham.
- Elizabeth, who died unmarried.

== Notes ==
Parliament of England
Preceded by Carew Raleigh; Robert Parkhurst	Member of Parliament for Guildford; 1660–1679; With: Sir Richard Onslow 1660–1664; Thomas Dalmahoy 1664–1679	Succeeded by Thomas Dalmahoy; Richard Onslow
Preceded by Sir Adam Browne, Bt; Sir Edmund Bowyer	Member of Parliament for Surrey; 1679–1685; With: George Evelyn	Succeeded by Sir Adam Browne, Bt; Sir Edward Evelyn, Bt
Baronetage of England
Preceded by Reversion from Thomas Foote	Baronet of West Clandon, Surrey; 1687–1688	Succeeded by Richard Onslow
