= Thomas Dalmahoy =

Thomas Dalmahoy (died 1682) was an English politician as the (co-)Member of Parliament for Guildford, 1664–1679. His left-handed marriage is notable in that he married the widow of his family's patron, killed at the final foray of the English Civil War, the Battle of Worcester, having served as his master of the horse attending to his travel arrangements — the patron was the Duke of Hamilton.

In his final years, being a noble Scotsman, among a minority of all members supportive of Lauderdale in the Cabal and the succession of James II and VII — considered one of the Court Party and not holding a Pocket Borough — he lost the 1679 election to exclusionist Morgan Randyll.

== Marriages ==
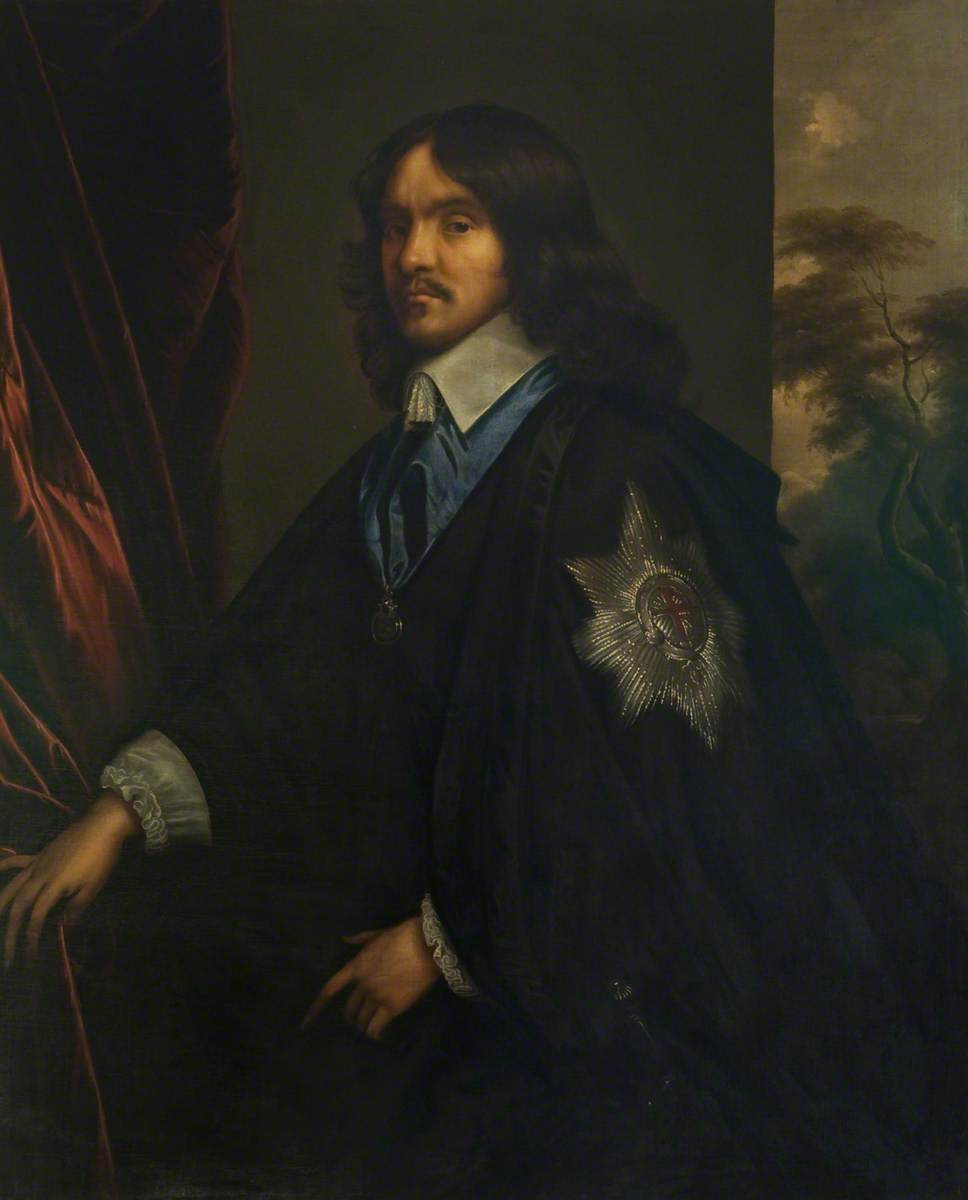
Last in the line of his family's main patrons, William Hamilton, 2nd Duke of Hamilton, attributed to artist Adriaen Hanneman between 1625 and 1650. Dalmahoy served has his Master of the Horse and took his wife after his death.

In the last 20 years of his life he owned and lived at "The Friary", Guildford and Wanborough Manor, Surrey, having inherited from his first wife Lady Elizabeth Maxwell (died 1659), widow of William Hamilton, 2nd Duke of Hamilton and the co-heir of her father, James Maxwell, 1st Earl of Dirletoun; the year before he died he married Elizabeth Clerke, widow of Sir William Clerke, 2nd Baronet.

== Career ==
He was a Member (MP) of the Parliament of England for Guildford, elected twice after the English restoration of the monarchy: on 5 December 1664 and March 1667.

== Biography ==
Dalmahoy came from a 13th-century Scottish knightly family and was third son of Sir John Dalmahoy of Dalmahoy, Ratho, Midlothian. As his family were long supporters of the family, he became master of the horse to William Hamilton, 2nd Duke of Hamilton, who was mortally wounded in 1651 at Worcester in the Royalist cause — Dalmahoy arranged his funeral, and later married his widow, Elizabeth Maxwell, a daughter of the Earl of Dirletoun.

In the interregnum lasting until 1680 Hamilton estates in Scotland were sequestrated; but as a half-share of his father-in-law's estate through his wife Elizabeth devolved to him, the Friary, Guildford and Wanborough Manor became his. Her noble daughters apparently disputed some part of the settlement.

Samuel Pepys, meeting the "Scotch gentleman" on his way to the exiled Court in May 1660, found him "a very fine man", and Speaker Onslow, who was young kin to Dalmahoy's second wife born at East Horsley, called him "genteel and generous". He was proposed for the order of the Royal Oak, with a (government-funded) annual income of £1,200 (equivalent to £221,000 in 2023).

Dalmahoy was elected for Guildford at a by-election in 1664, with the "personal support" of the Duke of York, who was said in personal enemy Shaftesbury's work A Seasonable Argument, to have voted for him. A moderately active member, he was appointed to 49 committees, acted as teller in three divisions, and made ten recorded speeches. A consistent supporter of the Government, he joined forces with Sir Nicholas Carew /kɛəri/ of the country party to oppose the Wey Navigation bill in 1665, and secured its rejection on first reading. He was appointed to the committee for the continuation of the Conventicles Act in 1668. A friend of Ormonde who had been in exile with Charles I, he appeared on both lists of the court party in 1669–71. He submitted a proviso to the new Wey Navigation Bill, 1670, and was appointed to the committee. His name appears on the Paston List. Lauderdale’s brother, Lord Halton, gained the property next to his ancestral home, a neighbouring family whom he had to defend against the increasingly vociferous demands for ousting (see the Cabal).

He pointed out in January 1674 that Lauderdale was not even in Scotland when the Scottish Parliament gave the Government the power to use the militia outside their own country. In the spring session of 1675, he was appointed to the committee to consider an alleged assault by Lauderdale’s servants on a witness, and reminded the House that:

the Duke of Lauderdale has been banished and imprisoned by the late usurped powers from 1648 till the King’s Restoration; and hopes he deserves not such severity.

In the same session of Parliament, Dalmahoy submitted evidence in a case in the House of Lords concerning his first wife’s mother as a legatee. The four lawyers who had appeared for the appellant were sent to the Tower, and it was moved that Dalmahoy, like John Fagg I, should join them for betraying the privileges of the Commons; but he protested that he had neither directly nor indirectly applied himself to the Lords, or owned their power, and the fellow member's motion was rejected without a division (vote).

Dalmahoy was named on the working lists and included by Sir Richard Wiseman among the government supporters. Lord Shaftesbury (formerly Lord Ashley) in 1677 marked him ‘doubly vile’. In A Seasonable Argument he was described as ‘a Scotch serving-man’ and ‘a creature of Lauderdale’s’. When the Duke of Norfolk's estate was debated he defended the character of his absent colleague Arthur Onslow, one of the trustees — of the opposite party. When complaint was made of Scots regiments in the French army, he pointed out that there were three times as many in the Dutch service.

In 1678 he was appointed to the committee to draw up the address for the removal of (privy) counsellors, yet acted twice with Charles Kerr, 2nd Earl of Ancram as teller for the adjournment to avoid such a debate on the Duke of Lauderdale. His name appeared on both lists of the court party for this year.

Eighteen years since the last elections on a national basis, Dalmahoy stood for re-election on the corporation interest at the first general election of 1679 when the issue of succession was culminating. He defeated notable republican tried and executed two years later Algernon Sidney despite energetic canvassing by the Quakers. Shaftesbury again marked Dalmahoy ‘vile’. Dalmahoy voted against exclusion (of James II and VII). His only committees in the first Exclusion Parliament were to inquire into the decay of the woollen manufactures and the abuses of the post office. In his only recorded speech, he again defended Lauderdale:

No man in his station has defeated the designs of the Papists more than the Duke. When ten or twelve thousand were up in rebellion in Scotland, all at a time, did not the Duke show himself a good subject? ... I never saw the French Ambassador with him, and I frequent his house.

As one of the ‘unanimous club’ he did not stand again, and sold his Guildford property in 1681. He died on 24 May 1682, and was entombed at St Martin-in-the-Fields, Westminster. No other member of his immediate blood-line sat in Parliament, either north or south of the border.

== Government offices ==
- Commissioner for assessment: Surrey (re taxes) 1661–80;
- Magistrate: Surrey 1664-death,
- Deputy Lieutenant 1665-death
- Commissioner for recusants 1675
- Commissioner for rebuilding of Southwark 1677.

Freedom of local Borough

Freeman of Guildford (1664-death)
