= Betchworth Castle =

Castle in Surrey, England

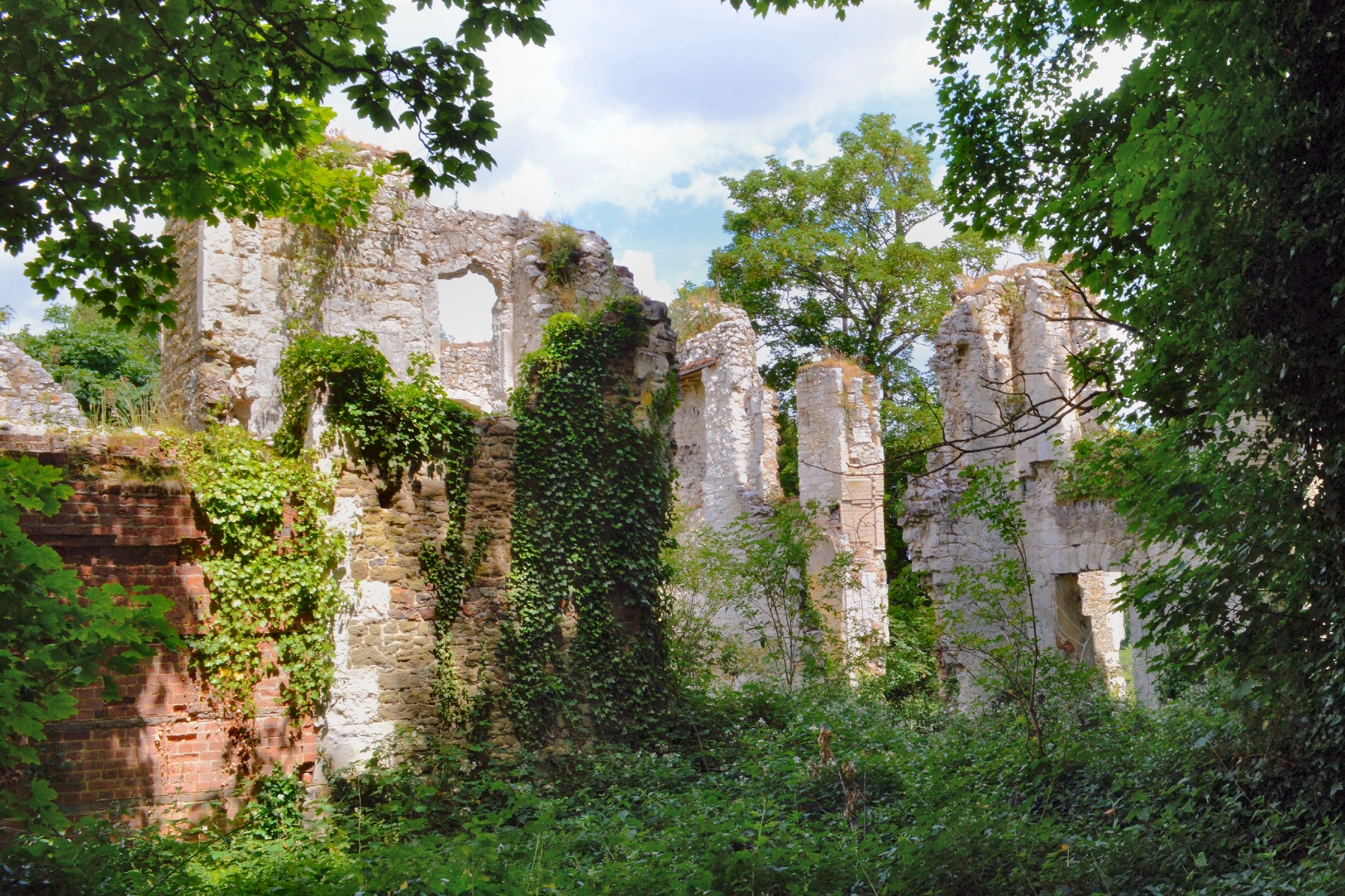
- Ruins of Betchworth Castle

- Location within Surrey
- 51°14′15.04″N 0°17′46.28″W
- Type: Castle
- Location: Betchworth
- OS grid reference: TQ 19029 50065

History
- Built: 1449
- Demolished: 1819
- Rebuilt: 1705; 1799

Site notes
- Area: Surrey

Scheduled monument
- Official name: Betchworth Castle
- Designated: 9 May 1951
- Reference no.: 1017996

Listed Building – Grade II
- Official name: Ruins of Betchworth Castle
- Designated: 28 November 1951
- Reference no.: 1378073

Betchworth Castle is a ruined medieval fortified manor house in the north of the semi-rural parish of Brockham, Surrey, England. It is built on a sandstone spur overlooking the western bank of the River Mole.

The ruin is a Scheduled monument and a Grade II listed building, 1.2 miles (1.9 km) due east of Dorking railway station in Dorking and 4 miles (6.4 km) due west of Reigate. It is surrounded by "Betchworth Park" Golf Course named after the village 1 mile (1.6 km) east.

In 1798, Henry Peters bought Betchworth Castle and spent considerable money renovating it to be a comfortable family home. Henry lived at Betchworth Castle with his wife, Charlotte Mary Morrison, and his twelve children until his death in 1827. After Henry’s death, Betchworth Castle was not inherited by his children and therefore was bought by David Barclay and later by Henry Hope, who demolished large parts of the castle and left it in ruin, as is seen today.

== History ==
=== Medieval period ===
Betchworth (or Beechworth among other forms) Castle was the seat of the manor of West Betchworth and was held by Richard de Tonbridge at the time of the Domesday Book in 1086. It started as an earthwork fortress built by Robert Fitz Gilbert in the 11th century. It was granted in 1373 to Richard FitzAlan, 3rd or 10th Earl of Arundel. His son Sir John FitzAlan, Earl Marshal of England, turned it into a stone castle in 1379. It passed by marriage to Sir Thomas Browne, Sheriff of Kent, who in 1448 rebuilt it as a fortified house. Sir Thomas was also Treasurer of the Household to King Henry IV.

=== Post-medieval ===
The last male Browne to own Betchworth Castle was Sir Adam Browne, 2nd Baronet, who died in 1690. Alterations were later made in 1705 using an unknown architect, and in 1799 by Sir John Soane, architect. Adam Browne's daughter and sole heir, Margaret, married William Fenwicke in 1691. In 1725 Mrs. Margaret Fenwicke of Betchworth Castle left £200 equivalent to £35,630 in 2025 to buy lands, to provide for apprenticing children, and for marrying [with a small dowry] maidservants "born in Betchworth and living seven years in the same employment", the surplus, if any, to go to the poor. St Martin's church, Dorking has a plaque to Abraham Tucker, author of A Picture of Artless Love and The Light of Nature Pursued, who lived at his estate of Betchworth Castle until his death in 1774.

In the 19th century, people saw little practical use for castles, and this one was outshone by a newer, bigger house in the larger grounds so soon abandoned, in the 1830s. The castle was bought by banking dynasty co-heir Henry Thomas Hope to add to his Deepdene estate in 1834, who demolished part of it to reuse the building material elsewhere. Without a permanent tenant, the remainder gradually fell into ruin, and became treated as a folly.

The historian and topographer H. E. Malden, in 1911 wrote:

"Judging by the print in Watson's 'Memoirs,' the mansion which, in the middle of the 15th century, replaced an earlier fortified house or castle, must have been extremely picturesque with its battlemented gables, clustered chimneys and oriel windows, standing among lawns and gardens descending to the Mole. The ivy is disintegrating the walls, and almost the only architectural feature is the arch of a fireplace. A remarkably fine avenue of lime trees leads to the ruin."

== Access ==
A route of public access (by foot) to the site was created in 2005 along a signposted track across the golf course. The entire ruin is currently surrounded by sturdy railings for safety reasons as there are unstable subterranean cellars. It is part of the Deepdene trail and there is free access to the ruin.

== Future ==
Mole Valley Council, which owned the castle, sold it in 2008 for £1 to local man Martin Higgins who has undertaken to conserve the structure and grounds, with financial support from English Heritage, Surrey Historic Buildings Trust and Mole Valley District Council, together with his own and other private funds, so that the public can be admitted. This has led to an increase in visitor numbers, from 7,000 a year in 2008 to an estimated 28,000 in 2022.
