= John Weston (1651–1712) =

English politician

John Weston (1651–1712), of Ockham, Surrey, was an English politician.

His father, Henry Weston, was also an MP for Surrey and Petersfield.

He was a Member (MP) of the Parliament of England for Guildford in 1689 and for Surrey in 1698, February 1701 and December 1701.
