= Penguin Collectors Society =

UK Penguin Book appreciation society (1973-)

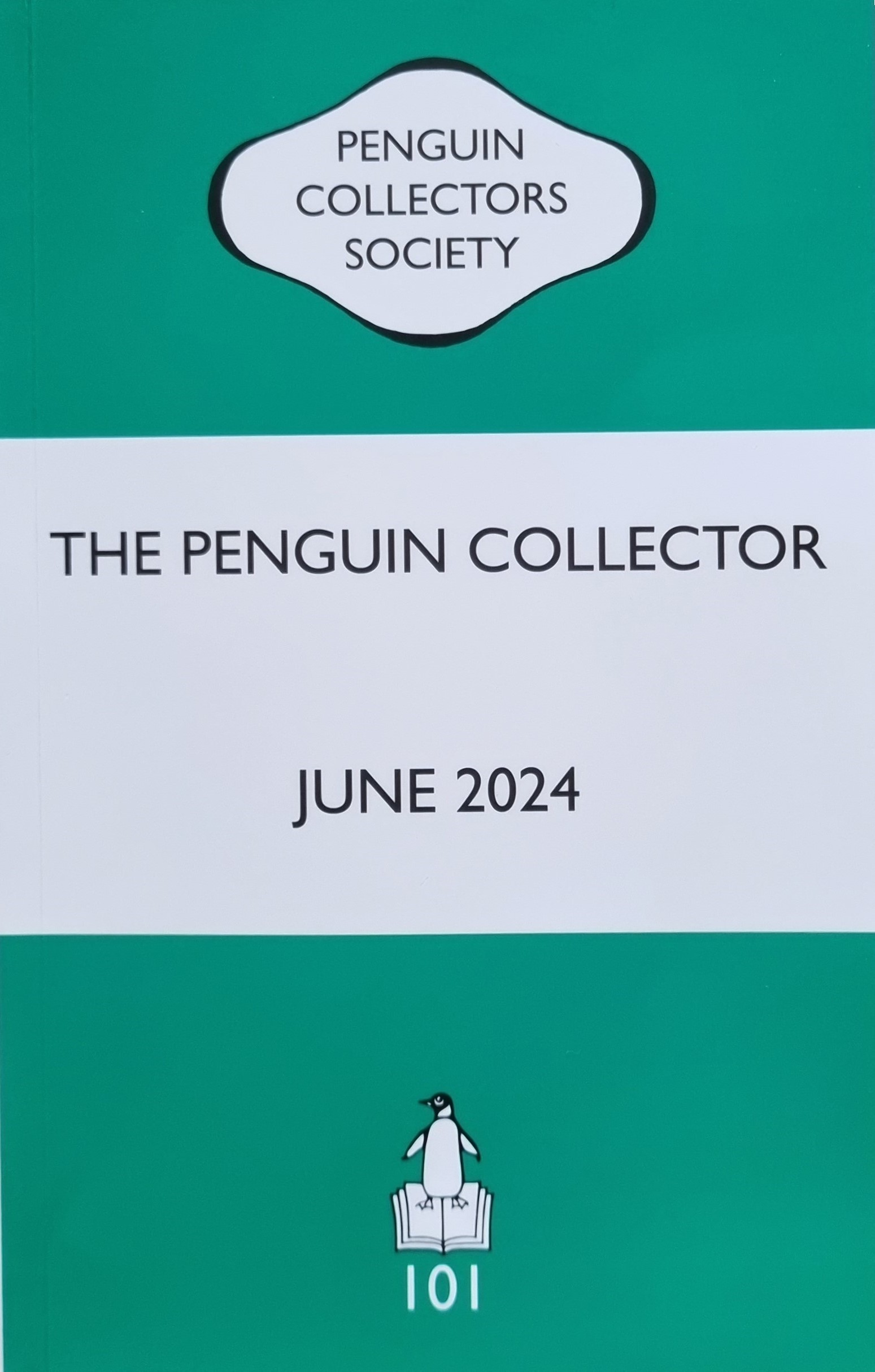
The Penguin Collector is the official journal of the Penguin Collectors Society

The Penguin Collectors Society (PCS) is a charity based in the United Kingdom. Its main purpose is to promote the study and research of all aspects of Penguin Books, the publishing company founded by Allen Lane in 1935.

== History ==
The PCS was started in 1973 by a small group of enthusiasts in Richmond, southwest London. The group recognised the importance of Penguin's contribution to publishing history, its innovations in book design and typography, and the role that its many thousands of published titles play in influencing and educating generations of readers. While it is evident that this rich cultural heritage should be preserved for future generations, paperbacks, by their nature, are not hard wearing and many of them eventually get thrown away. The PCS is therefore committed to the acquisition and conservation of Penguin books and related material, which it regularly donates to the Penguin Archive at the University of Bristol.

The organisation had 38 members in 1974, and currently has around 500 members Internationally.

The organization does not require its members to collect Penguin books, although some members are collectors. Its members' reasons for joining range from:

- The history of Penguin Books and other twentieth-century publishers.
- The design and content of the books, including cover artwork, typography and boxed sets.
- Series and subseries such as crime, Penguin Classics and Modern Classics, King Penguins and Penguin Celebrations.
- Imprints such as Pelican Books and Puffin Books.
- People past and present, including Allen Lane, Edward Young, W E Williams, E V Rieu, Jan Tschichold, Hans Schmoller, Tony Godwin, Germano Facetti, Romek Marber, Alan Aldridge, David Pelham, and other directors, editors, designers, typographers, cover artists and illustrators.
- Promotional materials, publications catalogues and other Penguin ephemera.

The PCS is funded by annual subscriptions from its members and by sales of its publications to non-members (members receive a copy of each new PCS publication). Research, writing, book production and all administrative duties are undertaken by trustees and other members on a voluntary basis. The PCS was registered as a limited company in 2001 and became a registered charity the following year. Its members meet annually at a different UK venue each time.

== PCS publications ==
The PCS publishes a twice-yearly journal along with other titles in book form, some of which are listed below:

- The Penguin Collector (normally published in June and December) is the official journal of the Penguin Collectors Society and features articles, letters, news and other Penguin material, with many contributions coming from PCS members.
- Drawn Direct to the Plate (2010) by Joe Pearson is a comprehensive study of Noel Carrington and the Puffin Picture Books [216 pages with 380 illustrations, mostly in colour].
- A Checklist of the Puffin Picture Books and Related Series (2010) is a companion to Drawn Direct to the Plate and provides detailed printing information for all Puffin Picture Books, Puffin Cut-out Books, Baby Puffins, Porpoise Books, Livros Ilustrados Puffin, Collection du Vieux Chamois, other foreign-language Puffin Picture Books, and Harlequin Books [80 pages with 212 colour illustrations].
- Penguin by Illustrators (2009), edited by Steve Hare, contains transcripts of presentations given by five Penguin illustrators during a second study day organised by the PCS at the Victoria and Albert Museum in 2007. There are also chapters by Quentin Blake and David Gentleman, plus shorter articles by Alan Aldridge, Coralie Bickford-Smith, Andy Bridge, Len Deighton, Alasdair Gray, Bryan Kneale, David Pearson and twenty other Penguin illustrators [200 pages with approx 600 colour illustrations].
- Penguin Classics (1994; revised and expanded 2008), edited by Russell Edwards, Steve Hare and Jim Robinson, provides a detailed history of the long-running Penguin Classics series, along with a fourteen-page checklist [144 pages with 200 illustrations, 73 in colour].
- Penguin by Designers (2007), edited by Steve Hare and Phil Baines, contains transcripts of presentations given by six Penguin designers – Derek Birdsall, Jerry Cinamon, Romek Marber, John Miles, David Pelham and Jim Stoddart – during a study day organised by the PCS at London's Victoria and Albert Museum in 2005, along with a reprint of a 1967 article by Germano Facetti describing his work at Penguin [184 pages with approx 250 colour illustrations].
- Companion to the study of Penguin Books (2020), edited by Tim Graham and James Mackay, is the fourth edition of the Society's standard reference guide to Penguin books [almost 800 entries with approx 300 colour illustrations].
- Penguin in Print (2003), compiled by Tim Graham, is a bibliography of printed material about Penguin Books with numerous extracts and colour illustrations [112 pages].
- The Penguin Modern Painters: A History (2001) by Carol Peaker examines the Penguin Modern Painters series of monographs that were published in 1944–59. The nineteen artists featured in the series were Edward Bawden, Georges Braque, Edward Burra, Duncan Grant, Ivon Hitchens, Frances Hodgkins, Edward Hopper, David Jones, Paul Klee, Henry Moore, Paul Nash, Ben Nicholson, William Nicholson, Victor Pasmore, John Piper, Ben Shahn, Matthew Smith, Stanley Spencer, and Graham Sutherland [124 pages with twelve colour plates].
- The Buildings of England: A Celebration (2001), edited by Simon Bradley and Bridget Cherry, considers the series of forty-six county-by-county guides to The Buildings of England by the art historian Nikolaus Pevsner that were published by Penguin in 1951-74 [128 pages with eight plates, some in colour].
- Advertisements in Wartime Penguin Books (2021), by Tim Graham, inspired by a Penguin Collector article by Russell Edwards, this publication includes both the original article and 112 more advertisements that appeared in Penguins [144 pages with 121 illustrations].

Further details of these and other publications can be found on the PCS website.
