= Penguin Composition Rules =

Design guidelines of Penguin Books

Penguin Composition Rules were the guidelines written by typographer Jan Tschichold for use in composing the pages and typography of Penguin Books. The rules were embodied in a four-page booklet of typographic instructions for editors and compositors. The booklet includes headings for various aspects of composition: Text Composition; Indenting of Paragraphs; Punctuation Marks and Spelling; Capitals, Small Capitals, and Italics; References and Footnotes; Folios; The Printing of Plays; The Printing of Poetry; Make-up.

Beyond this specific set of guidelines, Tschichold made further changes to Penguin's graphic standards. Penguin is well known for its standardized book covers and formats, as well as the diversity of the standards.

== Jan Tschichold and Penguin ==
Penguin Books was founded by Allen Lane in 1935. The basic look of Penguin was established before Lane brought Tschichold to Penguin in the late 1940s as head of typography and production. Tschichold was in England at Penguin between 1947 and 1949 before returning to Switzerland.

Tschichold's standardization of Penguin covers essentially took existing elements and refined them visually and refined their arrangement. Under Tschichold the covers included the use of Eric Gill's Gill Sans typeface, which he was careful to have spaced evenly. According to Tschichold establishing this quality was not immediately embraced by the compositors; “Every day I had to wade through miles of corrections (often ten books daily). I had a rubber stamp made: ‘Equalize letter-spaces according to their visual value.’ It was totally ignored; the hand compositors continued to space out the capitals on title-pages (where optical spacing is essential) with spaces of equal thickness.”

Along with Gill Sans, Tschichold made use of Monotype Bembo, Monotype Centaur (by Bruce Rogers) and Gill's Perpetua typeface.

The covers conformed to the golden ratio (4 3/8 in × 7 1/8 in, 110 mm × 180 mm). For Penguin's distinctive orange color, Tschichold replaced it with a warmer tone.

== Books on the topic ==
- Jan Tschichold: Typographer, Ruari McLean, David R. Godine, Publisher, 1975.
- Jan Tschichold: Master Typographer, Cees W. De Jong, Thames & Hudson, 2008.
- Penguin by Design: A Cover Story, Phil Baines, Penguin, 2005.
- Jan Tschichold, Designer: The Penguin Years, Richard B. Doubleday, Oak Knoll Press, 2006.

== See also ==
- Inspiring Penguins, An online illustrated essay discussing Tschichold's work with Penguin
- Jan Tschichold: Penguins, paperbacks and posters, a Guardian slideshow of Tschichold and Penguin
- The Jan Tschichold Justification at Type Code
- History of Penguin design, online at London's Design Museum
- Style guide
