= Sabon =

Old-style serif typeface

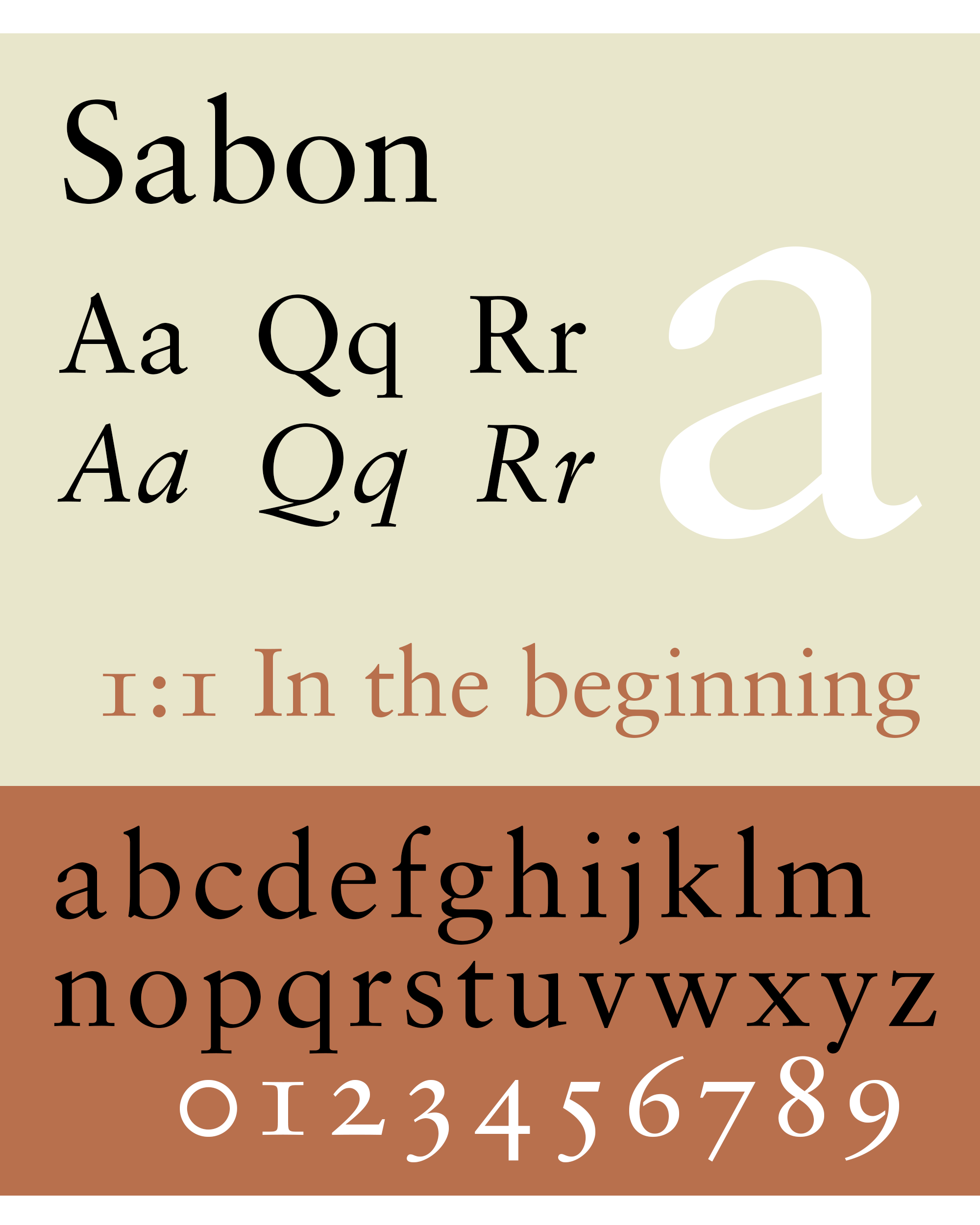
- Linotype Sabon
- Category: Serif
- Classification: Old-style
- Designer: Jan Tschichold
- Foundry: Monotype; Linotype; Stempel
- Date released: 1967
- Design based on: Garamond

Sabon is an old-style serif typeface designed by the German-born typographer and designer Jan Tschichold (1902–1974) in the period 1964–1967. It was released jointly by the Linotype, Monotype, and Stempel type foundries in 1967. The design of the roman is based on types by Claude Garamond (c. 1480–1561), particularly a specimen printed by the Frankfurt printer Konrad Berner. Berner had married the widow of a fellow printer Jacques Sabon, the source of the face's name, who had bought some of Garamond's type after his death. The italics are based on types designed by a contemporary of Garamond's, Robert Granjon. It is effectively a Garamond revival, though a different name was chosen as many other modern typefaces already carry this name.

A classic typeface for body text, Sabon's longstanding popularity has transcended its origin as a commission to fit a tight set of business requirements. Tschichold was commissioned by a coalition of German printers to create a typeface that could be printed identically on Linotype, Monotype or letterpress equipment, simplifying the process of planning lines and pagination when printing a book. The italic and bold styles were to take up exactly as much space as the roman, a feature imposed by the duplexing system of Linotype hot metal typesetting machines of the period. Finally, the new font was to be five per cent narrower than their existing Monotype Garamond, in order to save space and money. Sabon's name was therefore considered appropriate: a Frenchman who had moved to Frankfurt, he had played a role in bringing Garamond's type into use in German printing four hundred years before.

== History ==
Sabon was developed in the early 1960s for a group of German printers who sought a "harmonized" or uniform font that would look the same whether set by hand or on a Monotype or Linotype hot metal typesetting machine. They were specific about the kind of font that might work, rejecting the modern and fashionable in favour of solid 16th century tradition - something modelled on the work sixteenth-century engravers Claude Garamond and Robert Granjon. The requirement that all weights have the same width was influenced by the 'duplex' system of lead casting on the Linotype system: each Linotype-matrix can cast two different characters: roman or italic, roman or bold, which must have the same width. It also meant that the typeface then only required one set of copyfitting data (rather than three) when compositors had to estimate the length of a text prior to actual typesetting (a common practice before computer-assisted typesetting). Another hint of the design's origins in hot-metal typesetting technology is the narrow 'f', since Linotype machines cannot cast an 'f' that kerns, or extends beyond the letter's body.

Tschichold was well known as an eminent book designer in his own right, having promoted the now-popular ragged right style of book layout. A modernist, after the war, from 1947 to 1949, he played a hugely significant role in British book design, creating a unified, simple and inexpensive layout design for Penguin Books, a publisher which specialised in issuing cheap paperbacks. In his early life, he had lived in Leipzig and in the 1920s had devised a "universal alphabet" for German, improving its non-phonetic spellings and promoting the replacement of the jumble of fonts with a simple sans serif. Tschichold had become more interested in classical book design as his career progressed, and Sabon is a relatively faithful, organic book typeface strongly rooted in tradition. The name "Sabon" was proposed by Stanley Morison, an influential British Monotype artistic advisor and historian of printing. Different drawings were used for machining the larger sizes. Tschichold used an Egenolff-Berner specimen sheet from 1592 to provide initial models to work from, choosing a Garamond face for the roman letters and a Granjon face for the italics.

An early first use of Sabon was the setting of the Washburn College Bible in 1973 by the American graphic designer Bradbury Thompson. All books of the King James biblical text were set by hand in a process called thought-unit typography, where Thompson broke the lines at their spoken syntactical breaks.

Sabon was also used as the typeface in the 1979 Book of Common Prayer of the Episcopal Church (United States), as well as all of that church's secondary liturgical texts (such as the Book of Occasional Services and Lesser Feasts and Fasts).

Sabon was used in the 2000s as the official logo typeface of Stanford University until 2012. It is also used by Örebro University, together with the typeface Trade Gothic. Vogue and Esquire use a slightly modified version of it for headlines. Since 2010, First Things has used Sabon for the page text in its print edition. The Incorporated Council of Law Reporting uses Sabon for its Law Reports.

=== Digital releases ===
Several digital versions of Sabon exist, sold by Linotype and Monotype. Monotype Sabon is lighter than the Linotype version. Linotype also released Sabon Georgian and Sabon Paneuropean with extended language support. Adobe had its own version called Adobe Sabon, but it is not widely available as of 2022.

Fontsite released a version under the name Savoy, while Bitstream released a less faithful version under the name of Classical Garamond.

== Sabon Next (2002) ==
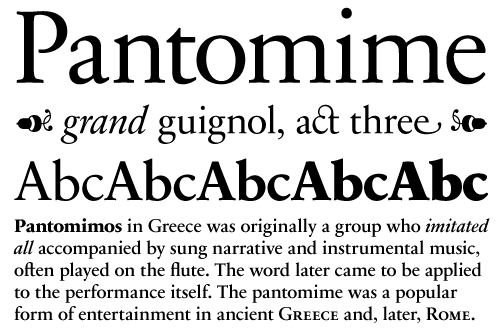
A specimen of the font family Sabon Next created by FontShop, showing the range of weights and stylistic alternates.

Jean-François Porchez designed the revival of Sabon known as Sabon Next. Sabon Next is based upon Tschichold's 1967 Sabon design for the Stempel foundry and Porchez' study of original Garamond and Le Bé models. Unlike in the original Sabon, Porchez rejected the approach of a matching-width italic for a more traditional design, narrower than the roman style, and chose to take advantage of digital typesetting technology to include a wide 'f' in the sixteenth-century style.

=== Commercial Version (Sabon Next LT Pro) ===
The commercial version of Sabon Next is commonly called Sabon Next LT Pro or Sabon Next Pro.

Sabon Next Pro consists of 6 weights (Display, Regular, Demi, Bold, Extra Bold, and Black). Despite its designation, the 'Display' weight is considered as another grade of the 'Roman weight' and Porchez recommended it for 11pt or above, while the 'Regular' weight is designed for smaller text sizes such as 8pt.

Sabon Next Pro includes Latin Extended characters but does not support Greek or Cyrillic. OpenType features include Small caps (except in Black weight), Ligatures, Special ligatures, Alternates, Caps figures, Oldstyle figures, Tabular figures, Fractions, Superiors, Ornaments, Swash, Proportional Lining figures. Except in Black weights, the fonts include a collection of printers' ornaments and dingbats. These ornaments are also available independently as the font Sabon Next Ornaments.

=== Microsoft Office Version (Sabon Next LT) ===
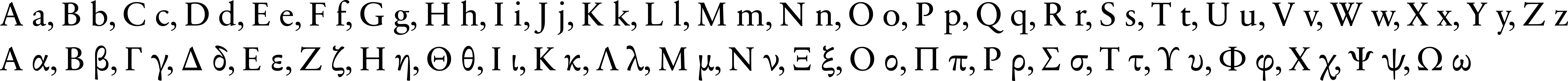
English and Greek characters of Sabon Next LT (Microsoft Office Version).

Users of Microsoft Office can download two weights (Regular and Bold) of Sabon Next via the cloud fonts feature. This version is called Sabon Next LT, without the 'Pro' label.

This version of Sabon Next does have support for Greek, Cyrillic, and Turkish characters, but some OpenType features (e.g., stylistic sets and alternative numeric figures) are not available.

== Sabon eText (2013) ==
Sabon eText is a version of Sabon optimized for screen use, designed by Steve Matteson. Changes include increased x-heights, heavier hairline and serifs, wider inter-character spacing, more open counters, adjusted thicks to thins ratio.

The family includes four fonts in two weights (regular, bold), with complementary italics. OpenType features include case-sensitive forms, fractions, ligatures, lining/old style figures, ordinals, superscript, and small capitals.

== Bibliography ==
- Friedl, Friederich, Ott, Nicholas and Stein, Bernard. Typography: An Encyclopedic Survey of Type Design and Techniques Through History. Black Dog & Leventhal, 1998. ISBN 978-1-57912-023-8.
- Lawson, Alexander S. Anatomy of a Typeface. Godine, 1990. ISBN 978-0-87923-333-4.
- Meggs, Philip B. and Carter, Rob. Typographic Specimens: The Great Typefaces. Wiley, 1993. ISBN 978-0-471-28429-1.
- Meggs, Philip B. and McKelvey, Roy. Revival of the Fittest: Digital Versions of Classic Typefaces. RC Publications, 2000. ISBN 978-1-883915-08-7.
- Meggs, Philip B. History of Graphic Design. John Wiley & Sons, 1998. ISBN 978-0-470-04265-6.
- Perfect, Christopher and Rookledge, Gordon. Rookledge's Classic International Typefinder. Laurence King Publishing, 2004. ISBN 978-1-85669-406-3.
