= Penguin Celebrations =

Penguin Celebrations was a book series released by Penguin Books in 2008, Penguin re-released 36 modern popular works using Penguin's distinctive late 1940s style, rebranded 'Penguin Celebrations'. Following the 1940s style; Green is for 'mystery', Orange for 'fantastic fiction', Pink for 'distant lands', Dark Blue for 'real lives' and Purple for 'viewpoints'.

The 'Penguin Celebrations' books are as follows:

Fiction

- William Boyd - Any Human Heart
- Jonathan Coe - What a Carve Up!
- Jonathan Safran Foer - Everything Is Illuminated
- Zoë Heller - Notes on a Scandal
- Nick Hornby - How to Be Good
- Marian Keyes - The Other Side of the Story
- Matthew Kneale - English Passengers
- Hari Kunzru - The Impressionist
- Marina Lewycka - A Short History of Tractors in Ukrainian
- Meg Rosoff - How I Live Now
- Ali Smith - The Accidental
- Zadie Smith - White Teeth
- Sue Townsend - Adrian Mole and the Weapons of Mass Destruction
- Pat Barker - Regeneration

Non-fiction

- Noam Chomsky - Hegemony or Survival
- Niall Ferguson - Empire
- Robin Lane Fox - The Classical World
- Malcolm Gladwell - Blink
- Brian Greene - The Fabric of the Cosmos
- Steven Levitt and Stephen J. Dubner - Freakonomics
- James Lovelock - The Revenge of Gaia
- Eric Schlosser - Fast Food Nation

Crime

- Donna Tartt - The Secret History
- P. D. James - A Certain Justice
- John Mortimer - Rumpole and the Penge Bungalow Murders
- Alex Garland - The Beach
- Barbara Vine - The Chimney-sweeper's Boy

Travel and adventure

- Ryszard Kapuściński - The Shadow of the Sun
- Redmond O'Hanlon - Congo Journey
- Paul Theroux - Dark Star Safari

Biography

- Charles Nicholl - Leonardo da Vinci: Flights of the Mind
- Claire Tomalin - Jane Austen: A Life
- Jeremy Paxman - The English

Essays

- Alain de Botton - The Consolations of Philosophy
- Jeremy Clarkson - The World According to Clarkson
- Alistair Cooke - Letter from America
