= Tanya Schmoller =

Tanya Schmoller (3 March 1918 – 14 January 2016) was a Uruguayan-born British historian of graphic art, and the personal assistant to Allen Lane, the co-founder of Penguin Books.

She was born in Conchillas, Uruguay on 3 March 1918.

In 1950, she married Hans Schmoller, Penguin's typographer, and had one step-daughter and one son.

Schmoller died in Sheffield, England, on 14 January 2016.

== Collection ==
- Manchester, Manchester Metropolitan University Special Collection Museum: Schmoller Collection of Decorated Papers

== Notable publications ==
- Hans Schmoller; Tanya Schmoller; Henry Morris: Chinese decorated papers. "Chinoiserie for three". Bird & Bull Press, Newtown, Pa. 1987.
- Remondini and Rizzi. A chapter in Italian decorated paper history. Oak Knoll Books, New Castle, Del. 1990.
- Sheffield papermakers. 3 centuries of papermaking in the Sheffield area. Allenholme Press, Wylam 1992.
- To Brighten Things Up. The Schmoller Collection of Decorated Papers. With a foreword by Mirjam Foot, Manchester Metropolitan University, 2008. ISBN 978-1-905476-27-5.
