= Jacques Sabon =

- Born: 1535
- Died: 1580 (aged 44–45)
- Occupation: Typefounder

Jacques Sabon (1535 in Lyon – c.1580-1590 in Frankfurt-am-Main) was a French typefounder. He worked with Christian Egenolff in Frankfurt in 1555 and Christophe Plantin of Antwerp in 1565. He is associated with the forms of roman type which were being developed by Claude Garamond and others. On Garamond's death, Plantin and Sabon acquired much of his collection of type, and it is sometimes unclear which were Sabon's own design, and which Garamond's.

After Sabon's death, his widow married Frankfurt printer Konrad Berner. The Sabon typeface, designed in the 1960s by Jan Tschichold, is based on a specimen printed by Berner.
