= Ruari McLean =

British typographic designer (1917-2006)

Ruari McLean CBE DSC

Personal details
- Born: John David Ruari McDowall Hardie McLean; 10 June 1917 Newton Stewart, Galloway, Scotland
- Died: 27 March 2006 (aged 88)
- Occupation: Typographer

John David Ruari McDowall Hardie McLean (10 June 1917 – 27 March 2006) was a British typographic designer.

== Early life and apprenticeship ==
Ruari McLean was born in Scotland on 10 June 1917, in Newton Stewart, Galloway. He was educated at the Dragon School and Eastbourne College.

He was apprenticed in the printing trade at the Shakespeare Head Press, Oxford, where he worked under Bernard Newdigate. He went on to train in Germany and at the Edinburgh School of Printing, and worked at Waterlow and Sons Printing in Dunstable, Bedfordshire. In 1938 he worked at The Studio magazine and in 1939 he joined the J. Walter Thompson advertising agency in Bradford. Later he moved to Lund Humphries printing in Bradford, Yorkshire.

McLean was profoundly influenced by the work of Jan Tschichold, the German typographer, and he visited him at his home in Switzerland shortly before the outbreak of the Second World War.

== Wartime service ==
During the war, he served in the Royal Naval Volunteer Reserve, acting as the British Liaison Officer in the Free French mine-laying submarine, Rubis, where he was in charge of the code books and, after each patrol, had to secretly report to the Admiralty on the morale of the French crew. From 1943 he was attached to Combined Operations Pilotage Parties, involved in daring explorations on enemy beaches in small craft in northern France. He served for more than a year in the Far East, his role being to reconnoitre Japanese beaches in Burma and other potential targets in Sumatra. In 1943 he was awarded the Distinguished Service Cross, having been a recipient of the Croix de Guerre in 1942, and was three times mentioned in dispatches.

Ruari McLean married Antonia Maxwell Carlisle in January 1945.

== Early career ==
McLean joined Penguin Books in 1945, with special responsibility for design of the Puffin range, bringing Tschichold to advise on design. From 1949 he taught at the Royal College of Art, and at the same time became involved with Rev. Marcus Morris in the planning the layout of the new boys' comic, the Eagle.

In 1951 he entered into partnership with George Rainbird to found the publishing company Rainbird, McLean, designing and contributing to high-quality reproductions of bird and flower books, as well as the About Britain guides. By 1958 McLean was ready to move to a smaller concern, going into partnership with Fianach Jardine and resuming general design work. He also edited 13 issues of Motif, a quarterly magazine that incorporated painting and sculpture to its typographical content.

== Writing on design and typography ==
He was a prolific collector of Victorian books and became an expert and well-known author of works on the subject. His Victorian Book Design and Colour Printing was published in 1963, with a second edition in 1972. This was followed by books on Victorian Bookbindings in Cloth and Leather (1973) and on those in paper (1983). He translated some of Tschichold's books and wrote about him in Jan Tschichold: Typographer (1975) and Jan Tschichold: A Life in Typography (1997). He later wrote his "typographical autobiography", True to Type (2000), and Half Seas Under, a record of his naval career (2003).

His best-known work is Magazine Design, published in 1969. McLean was of the opinion that the design and layout of magazines was of crucial importance and significance in the pre-television era, and this work became known as a practitioner's manual for those in the profession. He wrote the Thames & Hudson Manual of Typography, published in 1980, which drew on his unusually wide experience of the subject, as did his historical survey How Typography Happens, published by the British Library in 2000.

McLean was author of numerous other works, including Modern Book Design (1958), and many of these have become standard reference works.

== Later work ==
McLean continued as a practicing typographer, and was called upon by well-known British journals and magazines, such as The Observer's weekend review, The Economist, New Scientist and The Twentieth Century.

In 1973 he moved with his wife and family and his business partner, Fianach Jardine, to the relative seclusion of Dollar, Clackmannanshire, Scotland.

After moving to Scotland, he continued to be involved in major national projects, including the design of the Concise Scots Dictionary and the New Testament in Scots, with which he collaborated with Jardine.

Ruari McLean was Typographic Adviser to HMSO 1966–90, and much involved in assessing graphic design courses at art colleges all over Britain. From 1981 he also became a trustee of the National Library of Scotland. He gave the Sanders Lectures in Bibliography at Cambridge in 1983.

He was appointed CBE in 1973.
