= Pevsner Architectural Guides =

Series of architecture guide books

The Pevsner Architectural Guides are four series of guide books to the architecture of the British Isles. The Buildings of England series was begun in 1945 by the art historian Sir Nikolaus Pevsner, with its forty-six original volumes published between 1951 and 1974. The fifteen volumes in The Buildings of Scotland series were completed between 1978 and 2016, and the ten in The Buildings of Wales series between 1979 and 2009. The volumes in all three series have been periodically revised by various authors; Scotland and Wales have been partially revised, and England has been fully revised and reorganised into fifty-six volumes. The Buildings of Ireland series was begun in 1979 and remains incomplete, with six of a planned eleven volumes published. A standalone volume covering the Isle of Man was published in 2023.

The series were published by Penguin Books until 2002, when they were sold to Yale University Press.

== Origin and research methods ==
After moving to the United Kingdom from his native Germany as a refugee in the 1930s, Nikolaus Pevsner found that the study of architectural history had little status in academic circles, and that the amount of information available, especially to travellers wanting to inform themselves about the architecture of a particular district, was limited. He had previously written An Outline of European Architecture for the Pelican imprint of Penguin Books. When he was invited to suggest ideas for future publications by Penguin founder Allen Lane, he proposed two: the Pelican History of Art, and a series of comprehensive architectural guides to the English counties which became The Buildings of England.

Work on The Buildings of England began in 1945. Lane employed two part-time assistants, both German refugee art historians, who prepared notes for Pevsner from published sources. Sources used included the inventories of the Royal Commission on the Historical Monuments of England, the Survey of London, and the Victoria County History. Pevsner, who held positions at Birkbeck College, University of London and the University of Cambridge, spent the academic holidays touring the country to make personal observations and to carry out local research, before writing up the finished volumes. The first of the original forty-six volumes, Cornwall, was published in 1951, and the last, Staffordshire, in 1974.

Pevsner wrote thirty-two volumes himself and ten with collaborators. A further four of the original series were written by other authors: the two Gloucestershire volumes by David Verey, and the two volumes on Kent by John Newman. The first volume of The Buildings of Scotland was published in 1978, and the first volumes in The Buildings of Wales and The Buildings of Ireland in 1979. Revisions to the original English series began in 1962, and continued after Pevsner's death in 1983. Several volumes are now in their third or fourth revisions, and the final unrevised first edition, Staffordshire, was superseded by an updated edition in 2024.

== The Buildings of England ==
The books are compact and intended to meet the needs of both specialists and the general reader. Each contains an extensive introduction to the architectural history and styles of the area, followed by a town-by-town – and in the case of larger settlements, street-by-street – account of individual buildings. These are often grouped under the heading "Perambulation", as Pevsner intended the books to be used as the reader was walking about the area. The guides offer both detailed coverage of the most notable buildings and notes on lesser-known and vernacular buildings; all building types are covered but there is a particular emphasis on churches and public buildings. Each volume has a central section with several dozen pages of photographs, originally in black and white, though colour illustrations have featured in revised volumes published by Yale University Press since 2003.

=== Boundaries ===
The volumes originally used the boundaries of the historic counties of England, which were current at the time of writing. They largely continue to use the historic boundaries, but have been partially updated to reflect changes in London, Birmingham and the Black Country, and Cumbria. The volume on the historic county of Middlesex, for example, has been superseded by three of the six volumes covering the Greater London area, whereas Tyne and Wear, which was established from parts of County Durham and Northumberland in 1974, is covered in the volumes about those two counties.

=== Volumes in print and their editions ===
Since 1962, the guides have undergone a gradual programme of updating to reflect architectural-history scholarship and to include significant new buildings. Pevsner left virtually all the revisions to others, acting as supervisor only. He ultimately revised only two of his original editions alone: London 1: The Cities of London and Westminster (1962) and Cambridgeshire (1970). Both were later revised again by others. The programme of revision of first editions was completed in 2024 with publication of the second edition of Staffordshire, replacing that published in 1974.

Until 1953, all volumes were published in paperback only, after which both hardback and paperback versions were issued. The revision of London: 1 in 1962 was the first volume to be issued in hardback alone, and no further paperbacks were issued after 1964. Until 1970 volumes bore a sequential BE reference number, with Cornwall being BE1. The last volume to be so numbered was Gloucestershire 2: The Vale and the Forest of Dean (BE41). Thereafter ISBNs identify each volume. Beginning in 1983, a larger format was introduced, and all subsequent new editions have been issued in this format (while, pending revisions, pre-1983 volumes continued to be reprinted in the original, smaller format). All editions are now published by Yale University Press.

The list below is of the volumes that are currently in print; for superseded volumes, see below. Where revisions were spread over more than one volume, the preceding edition remained in print until the whole area had been revised.

Title of current edition	First edition	Co-author(s) or (Note: Pevsner is not credited as author in these editions) sole author	Second edition	Co-author(s) or sole author	Third edition	Co-author(s) or sole author	Current ISBN
Bedfordshire, Huntingdonshire and Peterborough (Note: Peterborough previously included in the 1962 edition of Northamptonshire)	1968		2014	Charles O'Brien	—N/a	—N/a	978-0-300-20821-4
Berkshire	1966		2010	Geoffrey Tyack, Simon Bradley	—N/a	—N/a	978-0-300-12662-4
Birmingham and the Black Country	1966–1974 (Note: First published across three volumes: Warwickshire, Worcestershire, and Staffordshire)		2022	Andy Foster	—N/a	—N/a	978-0-300-22391-0
Buckinghamshire	1960		1994	Elizabeth Williamson	—N/a	—N/a	978-0-300-09584-5
Cambridgeshire	1954		1970		2015	Simon Bradley	978-0-300-20596-1
Cheshire	1971	Edward Hubbard	2011	Clare Hartwell, Matthew Hyde	—N/a	—N/a	978-0-300-17043-6
Cornwall	1951		1970	Enid Radcliffe	2014	Peter Beacham	978-0-300-12668-6
County Durham	1953		1983	Elizabeth Williamson	2021	Martin Roberts	978-0-300-22504-4
Cumbria: Cumberland, Westmorland and Furness	1967 (Note: First published as Cumberland and Westmorland – see Superseded and unpublished volumes.)		2010	Matthew Hyde	—N/a	—N/a	978-0-300-12663-1
Derbyshire	1953		1978	Elizabeth Williamson	2016	Clare Hartwell	978-0-300-21559-5
Devon	1952 (Note: First published as two volumes: North Devon and South Devon – see Superseded and unpublished volumes.)		1991	Bridget Cherry	—N/a	—N/a	978-0-300-09596-8
Dorset	1972	John Newman	2018	Michael Hill	—N/a	—N/a	978-0-300-22478-8
Essex	1954		1965	Enid Radcliffe	2007	James Bettley	978-0-300-11614-4
Gloucestershire 1: The Cotswolds	1970	David Verey	1979		1999	Alan Brooks	978-0-300-09604-0
Gloucestershire 2: The Vale and Forest of Dean	1970	David Verey	1976		2002	Alan Brooks	978-0-300-09733-7
Hampshire: South	1967 (Note: First published as Hampshire and the Isle of Wight)	David W. Lloyd	2018	Charles O'Brien, Bruce Bailey	—N/a	—N/a	978-0-300-22503-7
Hampshire: Winchester and The North	1967 (Note: First published as Hampshire and the Isle of Wight)	David W. Lloyd	2010	Michael Bullen, John Crook, Rodney Hubbuck	—N/a	—N/a	978-0-300-12084-4
Herefordshire	1963		2012	Alan Brooks	—N/a	—N/a	978-0-300-12575-7
Hertfordshire	1953		1977	Bridget Cherry	2019	James Bettley	978-0-300-09611-8
Isle of Wight	1967 (Note: First published as Hampshire and the Isle of Wight)	David W. Lloyd	2006	David W. Lloyd	—N/a	—N/a	978-0-300-10733-3
Kent: North East and East	1969	John Newman	1976		1983; 2013 (4th)		978-0-300-18506-5
Kent: West and the Weald	1969	John Newman	1976		2012		978-0-300-18509-6
Lancashire: Liverpool and the South West	1969 (Note: First published as Lancashire 1: The Industrial and Commercial South – see Superseded and unpublished volumes.)		2006	Richard Pollard	—N/a	—N/a	978-0-300-10910-8
Lancashire: Manchester and the South East	1969		2004	Clare Hartwell, Matthew Hyde	—N/a	—N/a	978-0-300-10583-4
Lancashire: North	1969		2009	Clare Hartwell	—N/a	—N/a	978-0-300-12667-9
Leicestershire and Rutland	1960		1984	Elizabeth Williamson	—N/a	—N/a	978-0-300-09618-7
Lincolnshire	1964	John Harris	1989	Nicholas Antram	—N/a	—N/a	978-0-300-09620-0
London 1: The City of London	1957 (Note: First published in London: The Cities of London and Westminster – see Superseded and unpublished volumes.)		1962		1973; 1997 (4th) (Note: Not identified as a Fourth Edition in the text but as a "successor volume".)	Bridget Cherry; Simon Bradley	978-0-300-09624-8
London 2: South	1951–1976 (Note: First published across four separate volumes: Middlesex, London, except the Cities of London and Westminster, Surrey and Kent: West and the Weald)		1983	Bridget Cherry	—N/a	—N/a	978-0-300-09651-4
London 3: North West	1951–1952 (Note: First published in two separate volumes: Middlesex and London, except the Cities of London and Westminster – see Superseded and unpublished volumes.)		1991	Bridget Cherry	—N/a	—N/a	978-0-300-09652-1
London 4: North	1951–1952		1998	Bridget Cherry	—N/a	—N/a	978-0-300-09653-8
London 5: East	1952–1965 (Note: First published in two separate volumes: London, except the Cities of London and Westminster and Essex)		1998 (Note: Docklands area only – See Superseded and unpublished volumes.)	Elizabeth Williamson	2005	Bridget Cherry; Charles O'Brien	978-0-300-10701-2
London 6: Westminster	1957		1962		1973; 2003 (4th)	Bridget Cherry; Simon Bradley	978-0-300-09595-1
Norfolk 1: Norwich and North East	1962		1997	Bill Wilson	—N/a	—N/a	978-0-300-09607-1
Norfolk 2: North-west and South	1962		1999	Bill Wilson	—N/a	—N/a	978-0-300-09657-6
Northamptonshire	1961 (Note: Including Peterborough.)		1973 (Note: Excluding Peterborough – see Bedfordshire, Huntingdonshire and Peterborough above.)	Bridget Cherry	2013	Bruce Bailey	978-0-300-18507-2
Northumberland	1957	(Ian A. Richmond) (Note: Ian Richmond credited as a contributor rather than co-author.)	1992	John Grundy, Grace McCombie; Peter Ryder, Humphrey Welfare	—N/a	—N/a	978-0-300-09638-5
Nottinghamshire	1951		1979	Elizabeth Williamson	2020	Clare Hartwell	978-0-300-24783-1
Oxfordshire: North and West	1974 (Note: First published as Oxfordshire – see above.)	Jennifer Sherwood	2017	Alan Brooks	—N/a	—N/a	978-0-300-20930-3
Oxfordshire: Oxford and the South East	1974	Jennifer Sherwood	2023	Simon Bradley	—N/a	—N/a	978-0-300-20929-7
Shropshire	1958		2006	John Newman	—N/a	—N/a	978-0-300-12083-7
Somerset: North and Bristol	1958		2011	Andrew Foyle	—N/a	—N/a	978-0-300-12658-7
Somerset: South and West	1958		2014	Julian Orbach	—N/a		978-0-300-20740-8
Staffordshire	1974		2024	Christopher Wakeling	—N/a	—N/a	978-0-300-21835-0
Suffolk: East	1961 (Note: First published as Suffolk – see Superseded and unpublished volumes.)		1974	Enid Radcliffe	2015	James Bettley	978-0-300-19654-2
Suffolk: West	1961		1974	Enid Radcliffe	2015	James Bettley	978-0-300-19655-9
Surrey	1962	Ian Nairn	1971	Bridget Cherry	2022	Charles O'Brien	978-0-300-23478-7
Sussex: East with Brighton and Hove	1965 (Note: First published as Sussex)	(Ian Nairn) (Note: Ian Nairn was only indirectly involved in the text under revision in this volume.)	2013	Nicholas Antram	—N/a	—N/a	978-0-300-18473-0
Sussex: West	1965 (Note: First published as Sussex)	Ian Nairn	2019	Elizabeth Williamson, Tim Hudson, Jeremy Musson	—N/a	—N/a	978-0-300-22521-1
Warwickshire	1966	Alexandra Wedgwood	2016 (Note: Excluding Birmingham and the Black Country – see above.)	Chris Pickford	—N/a	—N/a	978-0-300-21560-1
Wiltshire	1963		1975	Bridget Cherry	2021	Julian Orbach	978-0-300-25120-3
Worcestershire	1968		2007	Alan Brooks	—N/a	—N/a	978-0-300-11298-6
Yorkshire: The North Riding	1966		2023	Jane Grenville	—N/a	—N/a	978-0-300-25903-2
Yorkshire: The West Riding: Leeds, Bradford and the North	1959 (Note: First published as Yorkshire: The West Riding – see Superseded and unpublished volumes)		1967	Enid Radcliffe	2009	Peter Leach	978-0-300-12665-5
Yorkshire: The West Riding: Sheffield and the South	1959		1967	Enid Radcliffe	2017	Ruth Harman	978-0300-22468-9
Yorkshire: York and The East Riding	1972		1995	David Neave	—N/a	—N/a	978-0-300-09593-7

=== City Guides ===
The first of the paperback City Guides, covering Manchester, appeared in 2001. It featured a new format with integrated colour illustrations. In most cases the City Guides have preceded a revision of the volume on the county in which they are located, although they go into greater detail than the county volumes and have more illustrations. The Bristol guide, for example, superseded part of North Somerset and Bristol, which at that point was fifty years old, and provided material for Somerset: North and Bristol, published three years later. Two of the guides, one covering Hull and the other Newcastle and Gateshead, remain the most recent volumes on their areas of coverage, as the corresponding county volume has not been revised since their publication. This series appears to be on a hiatus, with no new volumes published since 2010 and none confirmed as in planning.

Title of current edition	First edition	Co-author(s) or sole author	Current ISBN
Bath	2003	Michael Forsyth	978-0-300-10177-5
Birmingham	2005	Andy Foster	978-0-300-10731-9
Brighton and Hove	2002	Nicholas Antram, Richard Morrice	978-0-300-12661-7
Bristol	2008	Andrew Foyle	978-0-300-10442-4
Hull	2010	David Neave, Susan Neave	978-0-300-10702-9
Leeds	2005	Susan Wrathmell	978-0-300-14172-6
Liverpool	2003	Joseph Sharples	978-0-300-10258-1
Manchester	2001	Clare Hartwell	978-0-300-09666-8
Newcastle and Gateshead	2009	Grace McCombie	978-0-300-12664-8
Nottingham	2008	Elain Harwood	978-0-300-12666-2
Sheffield	2004	Ruth Harman, John Minnis	978-0-300-10585-8

Two supplementary works – thus far the only of their type – were published in 1998, one covering London's City Churches and the other the Docklands area (see London Docklands in Superseded and unpublished volumes below). Both were issued in the format of the main series rather than the City Guides. However, unlike the Docklands edition which represented preliminary work for an expanded main volume, the City Churches volume augmented the text in London 1: The City, published the previous year. The continued development of the Docklands area meant that the volume was superseded when London 5: East was published seven years later, but the City Churches volume remains current and was reissued by Yale in 2002.

- London: The City Churches (1998) (Simon Bradley) ISBN 978-0-300-09655-2

== Buildings of Scotland ==
Nikolaus Pevsner was enthusiastic about establishing a Scottish series, having responded warmly to an unrealised 1959 suggestion by the architectural historian Andor Gomme that the latter could produce it. The first volume in the series, Lothian, except Edinburgh, was written by Colin McWilliam and published in 1978. John Gifford was a major contributor, authoring five volumes and overseeing research on all but one of the remainder before his death in 2013. After Lothian, which was the only volume published in the original small format, a major task was producing Edinburgh (1984) and Glasgow (1990), which were ambitious in their scope of coverage of urban buildings. The remainder of Scotland was covered in the following decades, with the final volume, Lanarkshire and Renfrewshire, published in 2016. A revision of Lothian was published in 2024, the first full revision of a Scottish volume.

The series is organised using a mixture of Scotland's current council areas (e.g. Highland and Islands) and its historic shires (e.g. Fife and Lanarkshire and Renfrewshire). Some of the Scottish volumes are internally subdivided; for example, Argyll and Bute has separate gazetteers for mainland Argyll, its islands, and Bute. Unlike The Buildings of England, none of the Scottish volumes adopt a hierarchy of ecclesiastical buildings, instead grouping them together.

Title of current edition	First edition	Co-author(s) or sole author	Second edition	Co-author(s) or sole author	Current ISBN
Aberdeenshire: North and Moray	2015	David W. Walker, Matthew Woodworth	—N/a	—N/a	978-0-300-20428-5
Aberdeenshire: South and Aberdeen	2015	Joseph Sharples, David W. Walker, Matthew Woodworth	—N/a	—N/a	978-0-300-21555-7
Argyll and Bute	2002	Frank Arneil Walker	—N/a	—N/a	978-0-300-09670-5
Ayrshire and Arran	2012	Rob Close, Anne Riches	—N/a	—N/a	978-0-300-14170-2
Borders	2006	Kitty Cruft, John Dunbar, Richard Fawcett	—N/a	—N/a	978-0-300-10702-9
Dumfries and Galloway	1996	John Gifford	—N/a	—N/a	978-0-300-09671-2
Dundee and Angus	2012	John Gifford	—N/a	—N/a	978-0-300-14171-9
Edinburgh	1984	John Gifford, Colin McWilliam, David Walker	—N/a	—N/a	978-0-300-09672-9
Fife	1988	John Gifford	—N/a	—N/a	978-0-300-09673-6
Glasgow	1990	Elizabeth Williamson, Anne Riches, Malcom Higgs	—N/a	—N/a	978-0-300-09674-3
Highland and Islands	1992	John Gifford	—N/a	—N/a	978-0-300-09625-5
Lanarkshire and Renfrewshire	2016	Rob Close, John Gifford, Frank Arneil Walker	—N/a	—N/a	978-0-300-21558-8
Lothian (Note: originally published as Lothian, except Edinburgh)	1978	Colin McWilliam	2024	Jane Geddes, Ian Gow, Aonghus Mackechnie, Chris Tabraham	978-0-300-09626-2
Perth and Kinross	2007	John Gifford	—N/a	—N/a	978-0-300-10922-1
Stirling and Central Scotland	2002	John Gifford, Frank Arneil Walker	—N/a	—N/a	978-0-300-09594-4

== Buildings of Wales ==
The series has also been extended to Wales, and was completed with the issue of Gwynedd in 2009. Only the first volume, Powys (1979), appeared in the original small format style; this volume has now been superseded by a revised large-format edition, published in 2013. The volumes of the series are organised using a combination of the current principal areas (e.g. Pembrokeshire), the preserved counties (e.g. Gwynedd), and the historic counties (e.g. Glamorgan).

Title of current edition	First edition	Co-author(s) or sole author	Second edition	Co-author(s) or sole author	Current ISBN
Carmarthenshire and Ceredigion	2006	Thomas Lloyd, Julian Orbach, Robert Scourfield	—N/a	—N/a	978-0-300-10179-9
Clwyd (Denbighshire and Flintshire)	1986	Edward Hubbard	2003	Edward Hubbard	978-0-300-09627-9
Glamorgan	1995	John Newman	—N/a	—N/a	978-0-300-09629-3
Gwent/Monmouthshire	2000	John Newman	—N/a	—N/a	978-0-300-09630-9
Gwynedd	2009	Richard Haslam, Julian Orbach, Adam Voelcker	—N/a	—N/a	978-0-300-14169-6
Pembrokeshire	2004	Thomas Lloyd, Julian Orbach, Robert Scourfield	—N/a	—N/a	978-0-300-10178-2
Powys: Montgomeryshire, Radnorshire and Breconshire	1979	Richard Haslam	2013	Robert Scourfield and Richard Haslam	978-0-300-18508-9

== Buildings of Ireland ==
The Irish series is incomplete, with six volumes being published between 1979 and 2020. Research is underway on some of the remaining five volumes: Belfast, Antrim, and County Down; Connacht/Connaught; Dublin: County; Munster, except Cork; and South Leinster. (Note: Which will cover the counties of Carlow, Kilkenny, Wexford and Wicklow.) The series generally uses the traditional provinces and counties of Ireland as its boundaries and ignores the Irish border.

Title of current edition	First edition	Co-author(s) or sole author	Current ISBN
Belfast, Antrim and County Down	in preparation	—N/a	—N/a
Connacht/Connaught	in preparation	—N/a	—N/a
Cork: City and County	2020	Frank Keohane	978-0-300-22487-0
Dublin	2005	Christine Casey	978-0-300-10923-8
Dublin: County	in preparation	—N/a	—N/a
Munster, except Cork	in preparation	—N/a	—N/a
North West Ulster: The Counties of Londonderry, Donegal, Fermanagh and Tyrone	1979	Alistair Rowan	978-0-300-09667-5
Central Leinster: Kildare, Laois and Offaly	2019	Andrew Tierney	978-0-300-23204-2
North Leinster	1988	Alistair Rowan, Christine Casey	978-0-300-09668-2
South Leinster	in preparation	—N/a	—N/a
South Ulster: The Counties of Armagh, Cavan and Monaghan	2003	Kevin Mulligan	978-0-300-18601-7

== Buildings of the Isle of Man ==
A standalone volume covering the island, authored by Jonathan Kewley, was published in early 2023.

- Isle of Man (2023) ISBN 978-0-300-22502-0 (Jonathan Kewley)

== Treatment of bridges ==
A number of bridges connect areas covered by different volumes. However, there is no single approach for which volume should include the structure in its main gazetteer. In some cases, one volume refers the reader to the other, and in other cases only a few lines appear in one volume and a fuller entry appears in the other. In a very few cases (listed below) a full entry appears in both volumes.

Bridge	Connection	Volume(s) of main entry
Coldstream Bridge	Berwickshire–Northumberland	Borders; Northumberland
Erskine Bridge	Renfrewshire–Dunbartonshire	Stirling and Central Scotland; Lanarkshire and Renfrewshire
Forth Bridge; Forth Road Bridge	West Lothian–Fife	Lothian
Humber Bridge	Lincolnshire–Yorkshire	Lincolnshire
Kincardine Bridge	Stirlingshire–Fife	Fife
Queen Elizabeth II Bridge	Essex–Kent	Essex; Kent: West and the Weald
Severn Bridge	Monmouthshire–Gloucestershire	Gloucestershire 2
Second Severn Crossing	Monmouthshire–Gloucestershire	Gwent/Monmouthshire
Tamar Bridge	Devon–Cornwall	Cornwall
Tay Bridge; Tay Road Bridge	Dundee–Fife	Dundee and Angus

== Superseded and unpublished volumes ==
The revision of the series has rendered some original volumes obsolete, usually as the area of coverage has changed. For example, the county of Cumbria was created after the publication of Cumberland and Westmorland and North Lancashire, leading to the merger of material from both volumes in a single-volume Cumbria, a revision with a new geographical focus. The following volumes have been wholly or partially superseded:

Original volume	publication date	Current volume(s)
Cumberland and Westmorland	1967	Cumbria
Hampshire & the Isle of Wight	1967	Hampshire: South
Hampshire & the Isle of Wight	1967	Hampshire: Winchester and the North
Hampshire & the Isle of Wight	1967	Isle of Wight
London: The Cities of London and Westminster	1957	London 1: The City of London
London: The Cities of London and Westminster	1957	London 6: Westminster
London, except the Cities of London and Westminster	1952	London 2: South
London, except the Cities of London and Westminster	1952	London 3: North-West
London, except the Cities of London and Westminster	1952	London 4: West
London, except the Cities of London and Westminster	1952	London 5: East
London Docklands	1998	London 5: East
Middlesex	1951	London 2: South
Middlesex	1951	London 3: North-West
Middlesex	1951	London 4: West
Northamptonshire	1961	Bedfordshire, Huntingdonshire, and Peterborough
Northamptonshire	1961	Northamptonshire
North Devon	1952	Devon
South Devon	1952	Devon
Lancashire 2: The Rural North	1969	Cumbria
Lancashire 2: The Rural North	1969	Lancashire: North
Lancashire 1: The Industrial and Commercial South	1969	Lancashire: Manchester and the South East
Lancashire 1: The Industrial and Commercial South	1969	Lancashire: Liverpool and the South West
Suffolk	1961	Suffolk: East
Suffolk	1961	Suffolk: West
Sussex	1965	Sussex: East
Sussex	1965	Sussex: West
Yorkshire: The West Riding	1959	Yorkshire: The West Riding: Bradford, Leeds, and the North
Yorkshire: The West Riding	1959	Yorkshire: The West Riding: Sheffield and the South

In some published volumes and in advance publicity, certain titles were announced which were ultimately never published. A number of factors accounted for this, including the readiness of parts of the text covering certain areas and the anticipated size of the volumes. Unpublished titles included:

- Argyll, Bute and Stirling
- Ayrshire, Lanarkshire and Renfrewshire (Note: Announced in the Dumfries and Galloway volume (1996))
- Dublin: City and County
- London III (Note: Announced in the first edition of the West Kent volume (1969))
- South Strathclyde (Note: Announced in the Fife volume (1992))

== Related works ==
In 1995 Penguin, in conjunction with English Heritage, released a publication based on the guides entitled Looking at Buildings. Focusing on the East Riding of Yorkshire volume, Pevsner's text was adapted as an introduction, with a greater number of illustrations than the main guides. No further print publications were issued, but the title survives as an introductory website to architectural terms and selected buildings which feature in the Pevsner guides.

In 1995 a CD-ROM entitled A Compendium of Pevsner's Buildings of England was issued by Oxford University Press, designed as a searchable database of the volumes published for England only. A second edition was released in 2005. Bibliographies of the guides themselves were published in 1983, 1998 and 2012 by the Penguin Collectors Society.

In 2016, Yale University Press published three volumes, each serving as an introduction to some of the buildings and the architectural terms mentioned in the text of the guides. Published as Pevsner Architectural Guides: Introductions these are: an architectural glossary (also available as an app), a volume focusing on church buildings and another on dwelling houses (including vernacular architecture).

=== Celebratory volumes ===
In 1986, Penguin published an anthology from Pevsner's volumes edited by Bridget Cherry and John Newman, The Best Buildings of England, ISBN 0-670-81283-8. It has an introduction by Newman assessing Pevsner's aims and methods. In 2001, the Penguin Collectors Society published The Buildings of England: a Celebration, edited by Simon Bradley and Bridget Cherry, fifty years after BE1 was published: it includes twelve essays and a selection of text from the series. In 2012, Susie Harries, one of Pevsner's biographers, wrote The Buildings of England, Ireland, Scotland and Wales: A Sixtieth Anniversary Catalogue of the Pevsner Architectural Guides, which was published in a limited edition of 1,000 copies by the Penguin Collectors Society.

== Travels with Pevsner ==
In 1997, the BBC broadcast a series of documentaries entitled Travels with Pevsner, in which six writers and broadcasters travelled through a county which had particular significance to them. They revisited buildings mentioned by Pevsner, critically examining his views on them. A further series was broadcast in 1998. John Grundy, who presented the programme on Northumberland, was one of the revisers of that county volume. Both series were accompanied by booklets published by the BBC, describing the buildings featured in the programmes and suggesting others to explore. The counties visited and the travellers were:

=== Series One ===
- Norfolk (Dan Cruikshank)
- North Yorkshire (Janet Street-Porter)
- Dorset (Patrick Wright)
- County Durham (Lucinda Lambton)
- Warwickshire (Germaine Greer)
- Surrey (Michael Bracewell)

=== Series Two ===
- Derbyshire (Joan Bakewell)
- Hampshire and the Isle of Wight (Philip Hoare)
- Worcestershire (Jonathan Meades)
- Suffolk (Craig Brown)
- Northumberland (John Grundy)
- Bristol and Somerset (Philippa Gregory)

In both series, extracts from Pevsner's text were read by Benjamin Whitrow.

== See also ==
- Survey of London – an even more detailed but incomplete account of the architecture of London
- The Penguin Collectors Society for the Pevsner Memorial Trust
- The King's England
- Victoria County History
- Buildings of the United States – a series inspired by the Buildings of England

== Sources ==
- Cherry, Bridget (1998). The Buildings of England, Ireland, Scotland and Wales: a short history and bibliography. London: Penguin Collectors' Society. ISBN 978-0-952-74011-7.
- Bridget Cherry; Simon Bradley, eds. (2001). The Buildings of England: A Celebration. London: Penguin Collectors' Society. ISBN 978-0-952-74013-1.
- Susie Harries; James Mackay, eds. (2012). The Buildings of England, Ireland, Scotland and Wales: A Sixtieth Anniversary Catalogue. London: Penguin Collectors' Society. ISBN 978-0-955-83955-9.
