= Adam Lonicer =

German botanist

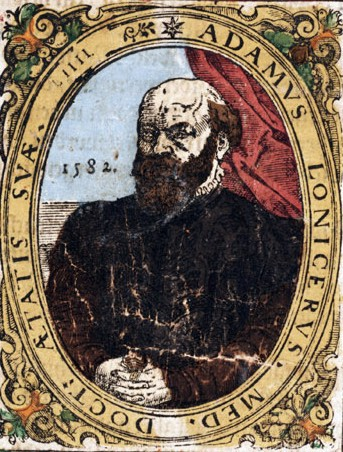
Portrait of Adam Lonicer 1586

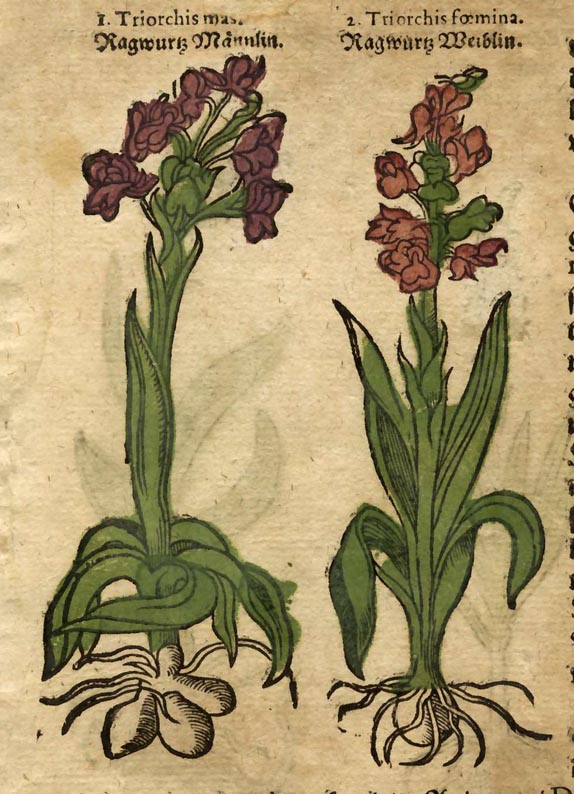
Plate from Kräuterbuch 1577

Adam Lonicer, Adam Lonitzer or Adamus Lonicerus (10 October 1528 – 29 May 1586) was a German botanist, noted for his 1557 revised version of Eucharius Rösslin's herbal.

Lonicer was born in Marburg, the son of a theologian and philologist. He studied at Marburg and the University of Mainz, and obtained his Magister degree at sixteen years of age. He became professor of Mathematics at the University of Marburg in 1553 and Doctor of Medicine in 1554, becoming the city physician (Stadtphysikus) in Frankfurt am Main. His true interest though was herbs and the study of botany. His first important work on herbs, the Kräuterbuch, was published in 1557, a large part dealing with distillation. Lonicer acknowledged his sources for the book, crediting Jean Ruelle, Valerius Cordus, Pietro Andrea Mattioli, Hieronymus Braunschweig and Conrad Gessner.

Lonicer married Magdalena Egenolff, the daughter of his Frankfurt publisher, Christian Egenolff. Christian Egenolff died in 1555, and Lonicer became a director of the firm, publishing no fewer than four editions of the Kräuterbuch between 1557 and 1577. He died at Frankfurt am Main.

The genus Lonicera in the family Caprifoliaceae is named in his honour.
