= Christopher Burke (design writer) =

British typographer

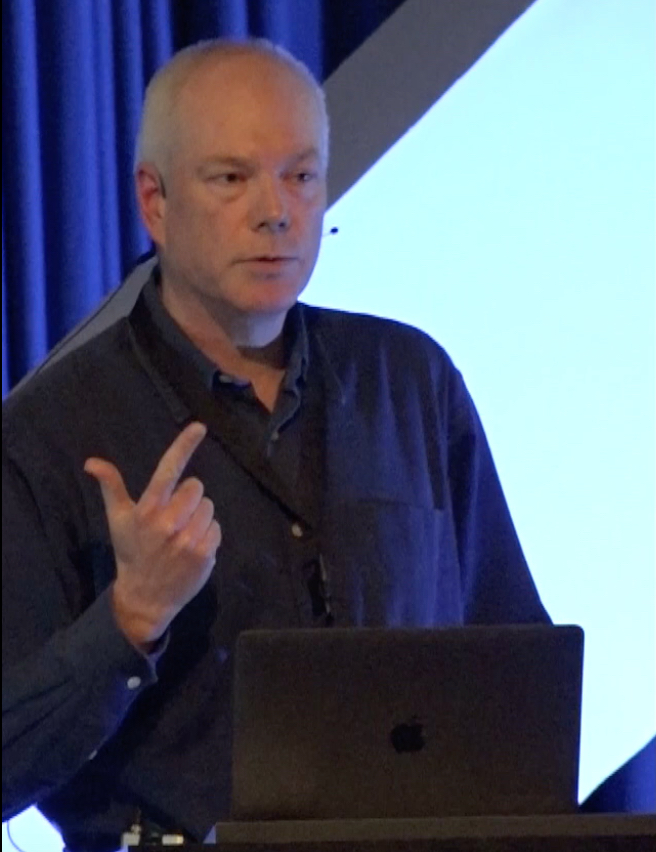
Christopher Burke speaking at the Schule für Gestaltung St.Gallen

Christopher Burke (born 1967) is a British writer on typography and a typeface designer.

Burke worked at Monotype before earning a PhD in Typography & Graphic Communication at the University of Reading in 1995.

From 1996 to 2001 he taught at the University of Reading, where he planned and conceived the MA in typeface design.

He is probably best known for his 1998 book on the typographer Paul Renner.

Burke's typefaces include Celeste, Celeste Sans, Parable and Pragma.

== Works ==
- Burke, Christopher, Paul Renner: The Art of Typography, Hyphen Press, 1998. ISBN 978-0-907259-12-1
- Burke, Christopher, Active Literature: Jan Tschichold and New Typography, Hyphen Press, 2007. ISBN 978-0-907259-32-9
- Neurath, Otto (edited by Matthew Eve & Christopher Burke), From Hieroglyphics to Isotype: A Visual Autobiography, Hyphen Press, 2010. ISBN 978-0-907259-44-2
