= Jean François Porchez =

French type designer (born 1964)

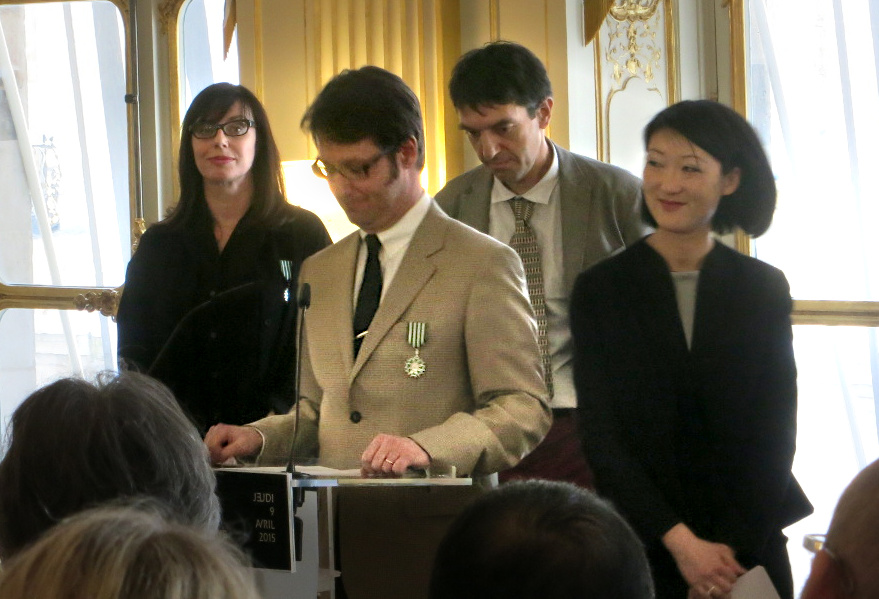
Jean-François Porchez (centre) in 2015, knight of the French Order of Arts and Letters

Jean François Porchez (French pronunciation: [ʒɑ̃ frɑ̃swa pɔʁʃɛz]) (born in 1964) is a French type designer. He founded the French type foundry Typofonderie in 1994. He was president of ATypI (Association Typographique Internationale), the leading organisation of type designers from 2004 to 2007. He is probably best known for releasing the new typefaces for Le Monde, the French evening newspaper in 1994. He has designed custom typefaces for customers such as Beyoncé Knowles, Costa Cruises, Orange, Peugeot and RATP. For the Linotype Library Platinum collection, he did Sabon Next, a revival of Sabon, itself Jan Tschichold's revival of Garamond.

Porchez has been a visiting lecturer at the MA typeface design MATD program at the Reading University (United Kingdom) and regularly conducts type design workshops all over the world. He also contributes regularly to conferences and international publications. He published Lettres Françaises, a book (in French & English) that, at the time, showed a large selection of contemporary French digital typefaces. In late 2001 he was the President of a jury set up by the Ministère de l’Éducation Nationale to select the new handwriting model and system for France and was a jury member of the 3rd Linotype Type Design Contest.

He founded the community blog and website Le Typographe, dedicated to French speaking typography and typeface design.
