= Christian Egenolff =

German printer (1505–1555)

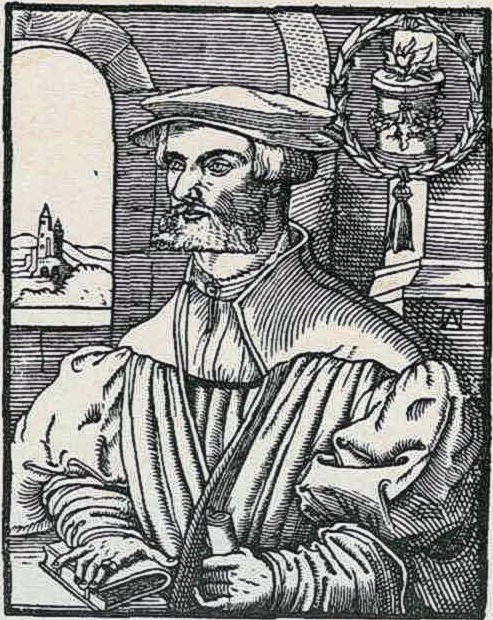
Christian Egenolff

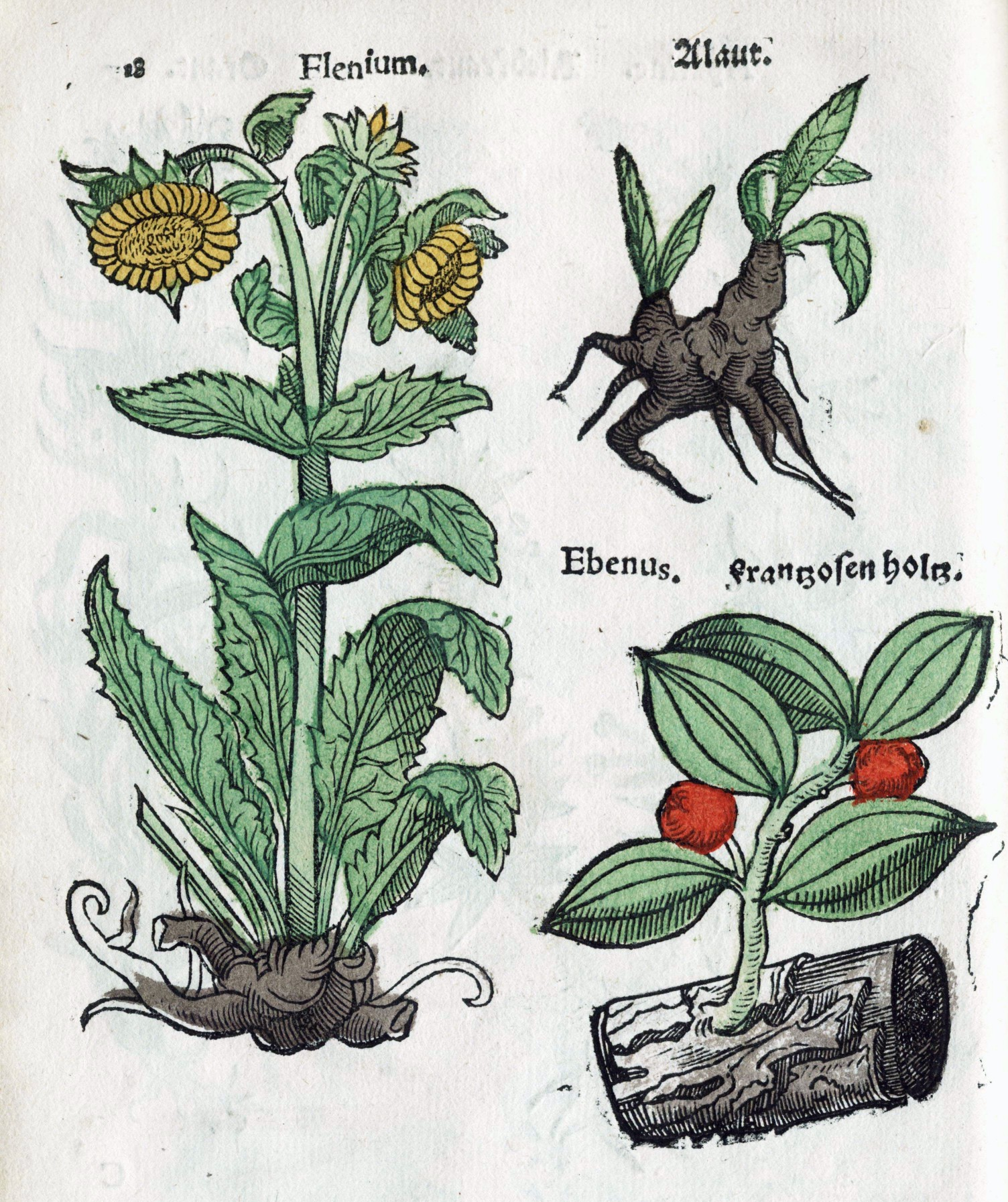
Plate from Herbarum, arborum, fruticum, frumentorum ac leguminem

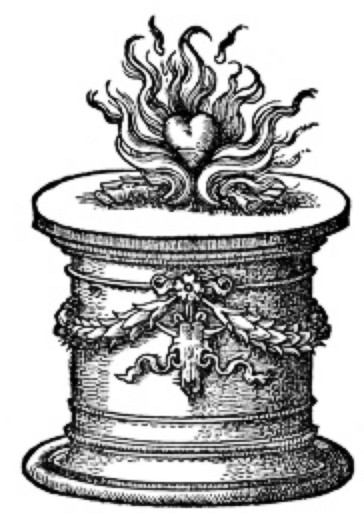
Printer's device used by Christian Egenolff

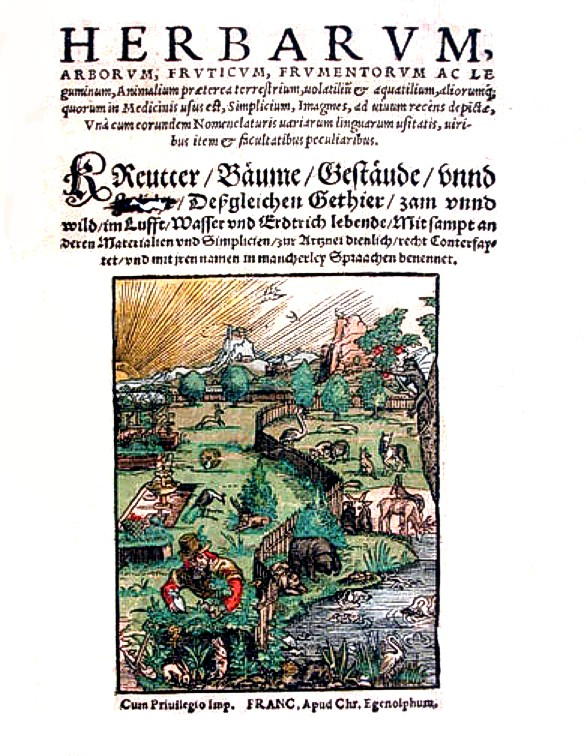
Title page of Herbarum, arborum, fruticum, frumentorum ac leguminem

Christian Egenolff or Egenolph (26 July 1502 – 9 February 1555), also known as Christian Egenolff, the Elder, was the first important printer and publisher operating from Frankfurt-am-Main, and best known for his "Kräuterbuch", Herbarum, arborum, fruticum, frumentorum ac leguminem, and re-issue of books by Adam Ries, Erasmus von Rotterdam and Ulrich von Hutten.

Egenolff was born in Hadamar and studied humanities at the University of Mainz from 1516, but later took up the trade of printing in Strasbourg, working for Wolfgang Küpfel and marrying Margarethe Karpf. He left Strasbourg in 1530 and started business as a printer/publisher and typecasting in Frankfurt-am-Main. Here he published more than 400 books over the next 25 years. His publications were often illustrated by the Nuremberg artist Hans Sebald Beham and Virgil Solis. Egenolff worked with Jacques Sabon in developing new fonts.

In October 1533 Egenolff was sued by Johannes Schott, a Strasbourg publisher, for infringement of copyright on Herbarium Vivae Icones, illustrated by Hans Weiditz and compiled and annotated by Otto Brunfels. Egenolff in his defense, argued that nature could not be copyrighted and that plants stood as communal models for any artist.

In 1535 he printed the German Bible and his own compilation of Chronica. In the following years Egenolff published works by prominent authors such as Hans Sachs, Johann Eichmann aka Johann Dryander (1500–1560), Sebastian Münster, Philipp Melanchthon and Sebastian Franck.

He died in Frankfurt-am-Main and was buried in the Peterskirchhof in Frankfurt. His daughter, Magdalena Egenolff, married Adam Lonicer, one of Egenolff's employees. Lonicer became a director of the firm after Egenolff's death, publishing no fewer than four editions of the Kräuterbuch between 1557 and 1577. Egenolff's widow, Margarethe, carried on the business until 1572 and afterwards his children until 1602.

== Bibliography ==
- Christian Egenolff : 1502 – 1555; ein Frankfurter Meister des frühen Buchdrucks aus Hadamar, Hrsg. Kulturvereinigung Hadamar, Limburg: Glaukos (2002) ISBN 3-930428-15-6
- Christopher VanSlambrouck: Notes on ' Christian Egenolff Bürger zu Frankfurt am Main '. 2022. Researchgate .
