= Charles Nicholl (author) =

English author

Charles Nicholl is an English author specializing in works of history, biography, literary detection, and travel. He has been active as a writer since the 1970s and has been publishing books since 1980. His subjects have included Christopher Marlowe, Arthur Rimbaud, Leonardo da Vinci, Thomas Nashe and William Shakespeare.

He was elected a fellow of the Royal Society of Literature in 2005.

Nicholl was educated at King's College, Cambridge. In 1972, early in his career, he won the Daily Telegraph''s "Young Writer Award", which gave him tickets to the Caribbean, as a result of which he visited Colombia. Since his early work he has shown an interest in counterculture. In 1974 he was the winner of the Sunday Times "Young Writer Award" for his account of an LSD "trip" (psychological reaction to a hallucinogen) entitled 'The Ups and The Downs'. He has since written about such topics as the drug trade (for example in The Fruit Palace) and the Elizabethan underworld (for example in The Reckoning).

Besides his literary output, Nicholl has also presented documentary programmes on television. He has lectured in Britain, Italy and the United States. He also lectures on Martin Randall Travel tours.

== Personal life ==
In the 1990s he moved to Italy, living near Lucca with his wife and children.

== Selected works ==
- A Cup of News (1984) – a biography of Thomas Nashe
- The Fruit Palace (1985)
- Borderlines (1988)
- The Reckoning: The Murder of Christopher Marlowe (1992, revised edition 2002) winner of the James Tait Black Memorial Prize for biography and the CWA Gold Dagger for Non-Fiction)
  - The Reckoning has also been adapted as a BBC Radio 4 drama-documentary.
- Somebody Else: Arthur Rimbaud in Africa (1998 winner of the Hawthornden Prize)
- Leonardo da Vinci: Flights of the Mind (2004)
- The Lodger: Shakespeare on Silver Street (2007); published in the USA as The Lodger Shakespeare His Life On Silver Street
- Traces Remain (2012).
