= Leonardo da Vinci: The Flights of the Mind =

Book by Charles Nicholl

- Author: Charles Nicholl
- Publisher: Viking Adult
- Publication date: 18 November 2004
- Publication place: United States
- Media type: Print (Hardcover and Paperback)
- Pages: 640 (Hardcover)
- ISBN: 0-670-03345-6 (Hardcover)
- OCLC: 56334378
- Dewey Decimal: 709/.2 B 22
- LC Class: N6923.L33 N52 2004

Leonardo da Vinci: Flights of the Mind is a 2004 biography of Leonardo da Vinci by Charles Nicholl.

== Description ==
The book researches the life of Leonardo da Vinci in Tuscane and explores the reasons of his historic success. The author's main observation is that most of Leonardo's work was unfinished. Through a thorough research, the author dismisses most of the romanticized facts about da Vinci and concludes that a lot is unknown about the genius inventor. Leonardo is described as an engineer obsessed with natural designs. Washington Post writer Alexander Nagel criticized Nicholl's technical analysis of the inventor's paintings that lack insight and misses an opportunity to push deeper into the mind of Leonardo.

The author retranslates many of Leonardo's mirrorscript writings. Some guesswork is admittedly thrown in this biography: an old woman visiting Leonardo in 1493 becomes his mother; Freudian concepts are used to explain his probable homosexuality (Joseph missing from his representations of the Holy Family); His stay in jail is linked to his plans to reverse engineer locks... The author also argues that Leonardo's obsession with flying devices comes from his alchemical quest for a levitation technology.

David Gelernter criticized his interpretations around the hypothetical encounter of Michelangelo and Leonardo.

The release of Leonardo da Vinci: Flights of the Mind coincided with the release of another Leonardo biography, Leonardo by Martin Kemp.

== Release details ==
- 2004, United States, Viking Adult ISBN 0-670-03345-6, Pub date 18 November 2004, Hardcover
- 2005, United States, Penguin ISBN 0-14-303612-2, 29 November 2005, Paperback
