= Hans Schmoller =

German-born British graphic designer

Hans Schmoller RDI
- Born: 9 April 1916; Berlin, Germany
- Died: 25 September 1985 (aged 69); Slough, Berkshire, UK
- Occupation: Typography
- Known for: Typographer of Penguin Books
- Spouse: Tanya Schmoller

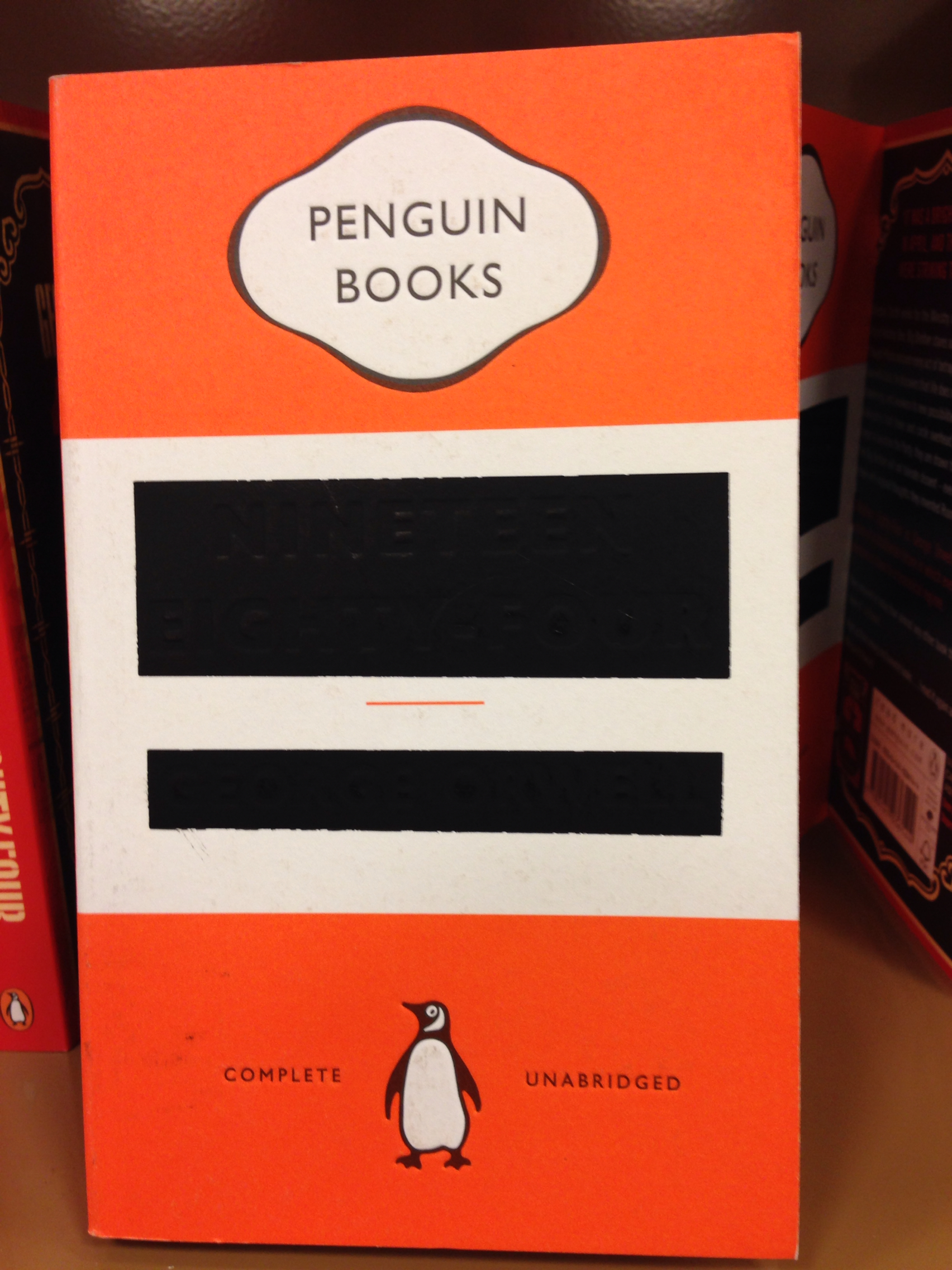
Example of typography on Penguin Books cover

Hans Peter Schmoller (9 April 1916 – 25 September 1985) was a German and British graphic designer who worked as Head of Typography and Design at Penguin Books from 1949 to 1976. During his Penguin years he played a crucial role in postwar British typography, and has been described as one of the most influential typographers of the last century.

== Early life and family ==
His father, Hans, was a paediatrician and his mother Marie owned a small business making and selling folded paper lampshades. He excelled in athletics as a child and in 1933 attempted to study art history at university, but was prohibited owing to his Jewish descent. Instead he applied to become a student of Rudolf Koch but Koch insisted on Hans receiving prior craft training.

In 1933 Schmoller began a four year apprenticeship as a compositor in the Jewish book-printing firm of Siegfried Scholem. He studied fine typography during the day at the Staatliche Kunstbibliothek and in evenings with Johannes Boehland at the Höhere Graphische Fachschule.

As the situation in Germany worsened for Jews, Schmoller made efforts to move abroad. In December 1937, whilst visiting his parents in Berlin, Schmoller received confirmation from the Paris Evangelical Missionary Society in Basutoland (now Lesotho) of a temporary job as manager of the Society's printing works in Morija. This was the last time Schmoller saw his parents. (They remained in Berlin until their deportation by the Nazis to the Theresienstadt Ghetto in October 1942.) Schmoller's father died of a heart attack soon after arrival in Theresienstadt, and his mother was murdered in the Auschwitz concentration camp in 1944.

Schmoller was interned in South Africa as an enemy alien from July 1940 to April 1942 and became a British citizen in 1946. He married Tanya Schmoller in 1950. In 1949 he replaced Jan Tschichold as Typographer at Penguin Books.

=== Accomplishments at Penguin ===
- Buildings of England
- Pelican History of Art
- The Complete Pelican Shakespeare
- Chief examiner in Typography to the City and Guilds of London Institute

‘Hans Schmoller was one of the last species of typographers with a profound background of the history of types and with an eye nobody could fool.’ - Hermann Zapf

== Collections ==
Hans Schmoller and his wife founded an extensive collection of decorated papers, which was continued after his death by Tanya Schmoller and is now housed at Manchester Metropolitan University as the "Schmoller Collection of Decorated Papers." This collection comprises over 4,000 sheets of decorated or patterned paper (primarily used as endpapers or book bindings). It includes handmade, hand-decorated, and machine-decorated paper, mainly from the 20th century, but also examples from the 19th and 21st centuries. The papers come from Europe, America, Japan, China, India, and Nepal.

A collection of Penguin Books that had belonged to Hans Schmoller and Tanya Schmoller was left to the University of Bristol by their children, Seb Schmoller and Monica Tweddell.

== Notable publications ==
- Mr. Gladstoneʹs Washi. A survey of Reports on the manufacture of paper in Japan "The Parkes Report of 1871". Bird & Bull Press, Newtown, Pa. 1984.
- Hans Schmoller; Tanya Schmoller; Henry Morris: Chinese decorated papers. "Chinoiserie for three". Bird & Bull Press, Newtown, Pa. 1987.
