= Christopher Marlowe in fiction =

Depictions of English dramatist (1564–1593)

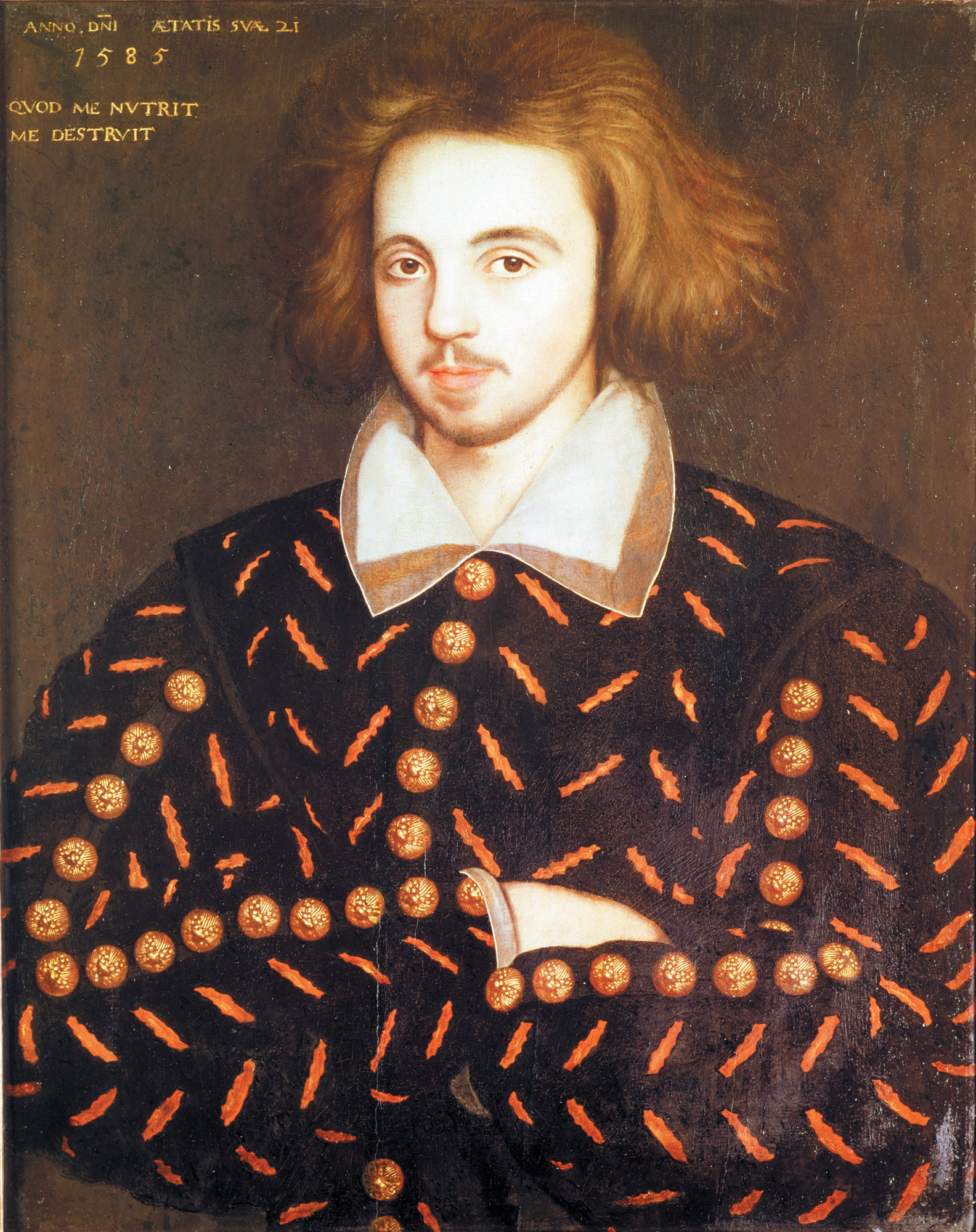
Anonymous 16th century portrait, suggested to be Christopher Marlowe

Christopher Marlowe (1564–1593), English playwright and poet, has appeared in works of fiction since the nineteenth century. He was a contemporary of William Shakespeare, and has been suggested as an alternative author of Shakespeare's works, an idea not accepted in mainstream scholarship. Marlowe, alleged to have been a government spy and frequently claimed to have been homosexual, was killed in 1593.

== Overview ==
Marlowe first appeared as a literary figure in 1825 in the first part of Ludwig Tieck's novella Dichterleben. In it, Tieck addresses, among other things, the conflict between Romanticism, represented by Shakespeare, and Sturm und Drang, represented by Marlowe. The opposite view was held by Richard Henry Horne, in whose 1837 drama The Death of Marlowe Marlowe first appeared as a fictional character in English literature. Horne's Marlowe is Romanticism personified. Although numerous authors have since had Marlowe appear in a wide variety of literary genres, this has been done with astonishing unimaginativeness. He is usually the homosexual outsider who rebels against the establishment and fits perfectly into the Elizabethan theatre world, which is described as a gathering place for alternative lifestyles.

== Books ==
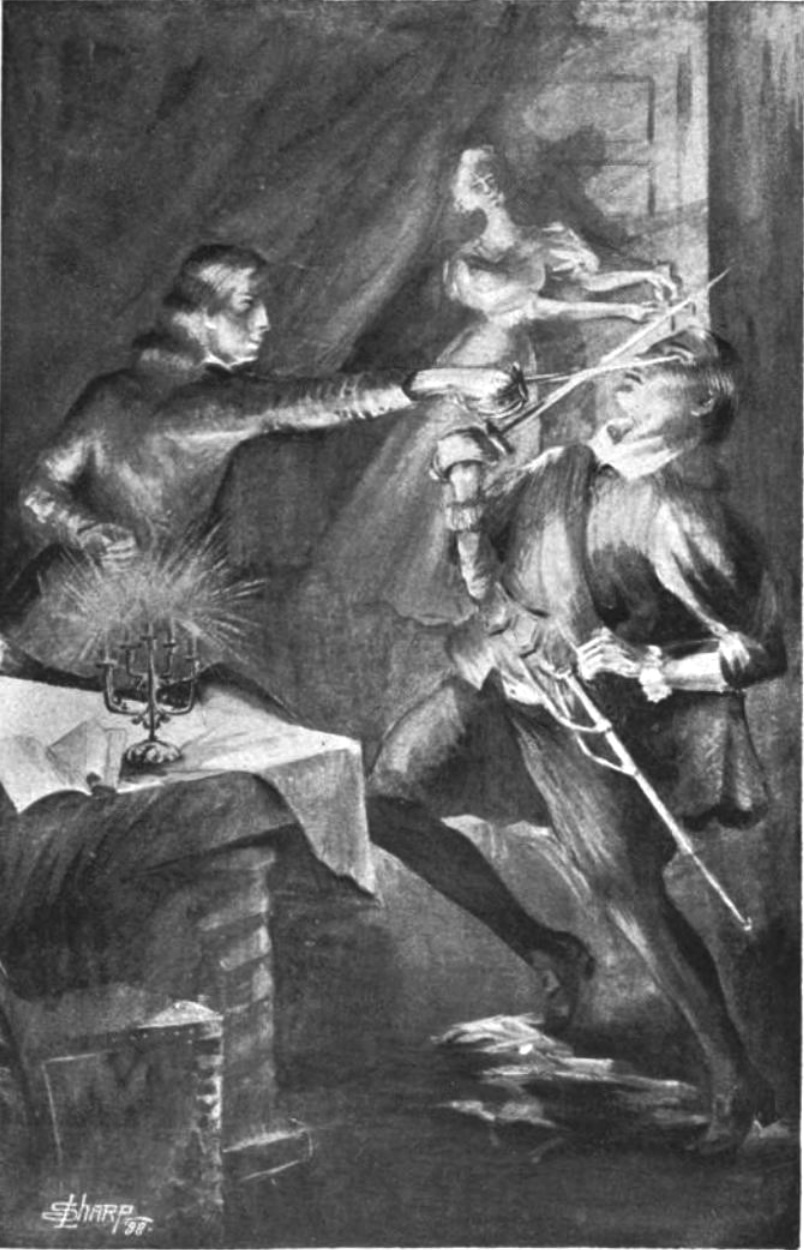
Marlowe kills Francis Frazer, illustration from It was Marlowe

- Wilbur G. Zeigler's novel It was Marlowe (1895) was the first book to argue that Marlowe's death was faked — apparently in support of Zeigler's claim that Marlowe was the actual author of Hamlet, which was written after Marlowe's recorded death.
- Philip Lindsay's One Dagger For Two (1932), a fictionalized biography.
- Robert DeMaria's To Be a King (1976), a historical novel portraying Marlowe's life from childhood through his London career, depicting his literary circle, personal life and involvement in Elizabethan espionage.
- Herbert Lom's Enter a Spy: The Double Life of Christopher Marlowe (1978), a historical novel. In this story Marlowe has an affair with Frances Walsingham.
- In "Men of good fortune", an issue of Neil Gaiman's The Sandman from 1990, Marlowe and Shakespeare discuss Doctor Faustus. Shakespeare openly laments that Marlowe is the greater poet, which attracts Dream's attention. Marlowe also appears in the spin-off The Dreaming: Waking Hours (2020), where he is one of several Shakespeare authorship candidates in a dream.
- Anthony Burgess's A Dead Man in Deptford (1993) was the last of Burgess's novels to be published in his lifetime. Marlowe is portrayed as a homosexual secret agent.
- Christopherus by Robin Chapman (1993) tells of Marlowe and Thomas Kyd.
- Marlowe is a main character Harry Turtledove's Ruled Britannia (2002), an alternate history depicting an England where the Spanish Armada was successful in 1588 and imposed the rule of King Philip II of Spain. In this depiction, Marlowe is still alive in 1598 and is, with Shakespeare, active among conspirators seeking to overthrow Spanish rule and restore the imprisoned Queen Elizabeth.
- Louise Welsh's 2004 novel Tamburlaine Must Die about Marlowe's last days is an "alternative fictional account as to what really went on". It is written as a journal-entry by Marlowe.
- In History Play (2005) by Rodney Bolt, Marlowe fakes his death and flees England.
- Marlowe plays a major role in Elizabeth Bear's The Promethean Age novels (2006–2013). In this story Marlowe and Shakespeare had a secret, deeply emotional homosexual love affair and many of Shakespeare's Sonnets were written to express his love for Marlowe. Marlowe was not assassinated in 1593 but was taken into Faerie where he became the lover of the witch Morgan le Fay. He also appears in Bear's short story "This Tragic Glass" (2004).
- M. J. Trow's The Kit Marlowe Series (2011–2024), depicts Marlowe as a detective and spy for Sir Francis Walsingham. Trow has also written non-fiction about Marlowe.
- In Ros Barber's verse novel The Marlowe Papers (2012), Marlowe looks back on his past and faked death and his writing of the plays attributed to William Shakespeare. It won the Desmond Elliott Prize for 2013.
- Marlowe appears in Shadow of Night (2012) by Deborah Harkness, the second book in the All Souls trilogy. Marlowe, a daemon, is one of many historical figures in this story.
- Geoffrey Aggeler's Horses of the Night (2016) provides a fictional account of Marlowe's writing career, spying activities, and death.
- Michelle Butler Hallett's This Marlowe (2016) explores the political context of 1593 England and relationship between Thomas Kyd and Christopher Marlowe, and gives an account of Kyd's arrest and interrogation and Marlowe's death.
- The Rise and Fall of D.O.D.O. (2017) by Neal Stephenson and Nicole Galland features Marlowe in a minor role, having faked his death as a means of becoming a more effective spy.
- Marlowe is the main character in A Tip for the Hangman (2021) by Allison Epstein. He investigates the Babington Plot while struggling as a student at Cambridge.
- The Marlen of Prague: Christopher Marlowe and the City of Gold (2022), is historical fantasy by Angeli Primlani. Marlowe is one of the Queen's mages who casts a spell against the Spanish Armada and changes the fabric of reality.
- In By Any Other Name (2024) by Jodi Picoult, Marlowe is a friend of poet Emilia Lanier. The novel is inspired by the Emilia Lanier theory of Shakespeare authorship.

== Theater, film and television ==
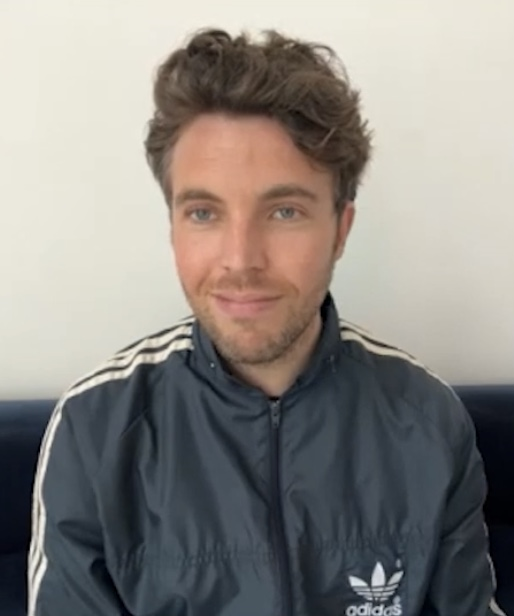
Tom Hughes portrayed Marlowe in 2020

- Marlowe is the protagonist of Richard Henry Horne's 1837 verse tragedy The Death of Marlowe, in which a love affair with the fictitious courtesan Cecilia ultimately leads to the eponymous hero's death.
- In the drama-series Will Shakespeare (1978) Marlowe is portrayed by Ian McShane.
- Leo Rost's Marlowe (1981) is an American rock musical that was staged on Broadway.
- Peter Whelan's play The School of Night (1992), about Marlowe's links to the freethinking The School of Night and the young Shakespeare, was performed by the Royal Shakespeare Company in Stratford-upon-Avon.
- Rupert Everett portrays Marlowe in the film Shakespeare in Love (1998).
- In the film Anonymous (2011) he is played by Trystan Gravelle.
- John Hurt plays Marlowe, who still lives as a vampire in the 21st century, in Jim Jarmusch's Only Lovers Left Alive (2013). Reference is made to the Marlovian authorship theory. The film was nominated for a Palme d'Or in 2013.
- Marlowe is a character played by Jim Howick in the 2015 comedy Bill.
- Marlowe (played by Jamie Campbell-Bower) is a main character in the 2017 TNT series Will.
- Marlowe (played by Tim Downie) is a main character in Ben Elton's Shakespeare-sitcom Upstart Crow (2016). In this series, Shakespeare writes Marlowe's plays for him, providing cover for Marlowe's spy-activities. Downie's Marlowe has similarities to Lord Flashheart from Elton's Blackadder.
- Tom Hughes played Marlowe on the 2020 season of the fantasy-series A Discovery of Witches, adapted from Deborah Harkness' novels.
- Ncuti Gatwa played Marlowe in Liz Duffy Adams' 2022 play Born with Teeth, in its European premiere in London's West End in 2025 Marlowe is portrayed as a spy for the Crown.

== Radio ==
- Christopher Marlowe, a re-enactment of Marlowe's life and death starring Stan Geverts as Marlowe, was broadcast on the Municipal Broadcasting System on October 11, 1950.
- The Christopher Marlowe Mysteries, written by Ged Parsons and starring Dominic Jephcott as Marlowe, was a four-episode BBC Radio 4 series, first broadcast in 2007.
- Michael Butt's radio play Unauthorized History: The Killing was first broadcast as part of the Afternoon Drama series on BBC Radio 4 on 17 August 2010.
- A three-part dramatization of Charles Nicholl's book The Reckoning: The Murder of Christopher Marlowe, adapted by Mike Walker and directed by Sasha Yevtushenko with the author as presenter and Chris Lew Kum Hoi as Marlowe, was broadcast in May 2022 on BBC Radio 4.
