= 1593 in literature =

This article presents lists of the literary events and publications in 1593.

== Events ==
- Ongoing – London theatres remain closed for almost the whole year as a result of the previous year's outbreak of bubonic plague. In the summer, Edward Alleyn and other actors make a provincial tour. Some performances take place in the winter, when plague tends to abate. Lord Strange's Men act three times in January a play called Titus – perhaps Shakespeare's Titus Andronicus.
- After April – William Shakespeare's Venus and Adonis probably becomes his first published work, printed from his own manuscript. In his lifetime it will be his most frequently reprinted work: at least nine times.
- May 5 – "Dutch church libel" bills posted in London threaten Protestant refugees from France and the Netherlands, alluding to Christopher Marlowe's plays.
- May 12 – The English dramatist Thomas Kyd is arrested over the "Dutch church libel". "Atheist" literature found in his home is claimed to be Marlowe's.
- May 18 – A warrant for the arrest of Christopher Marlowe is issued. On May 20 he presents himself to the Privy Council.
- May 29 – The Welsh-born Protestant John Penry is executed for involvement in the Marprelate Controversy.
- May 30 – Christopher Marlowe is stabbed to death by a speculator, Ingram Frizer, in a dispute over a bill at a lodging house in Deptford kept by the widow Eleanor Bull.

== New books ==
=== Prose ===
- Bible of Kralice, first complete translation of Bible into Czech
- Fray Juan de Plasencia – Doctrina Christiana, first book published in the Philippines, in Spanish and Tagalog
- John Eliot – Ortho-epia Gallica
- Claudius Hollyband (Claude de Sainliens) – A Dictionarie French and English
- Richard Hooker – Of the Lawes of Ecclesiastical Politie
- Antonio Possevino – Bibliotheca selecta

=== Drama ===
- Daniel Cramer – Plagium
- Thomas Kyd (probably, perhaps with Shakespeare) – The Raigne of King Edward the Third (approximate date)
- George Peele – Famous Chronicle of King Edward the First
- George Peele (possibly) – The Life and Death of Jack Straw (first published)

=== Poetry ===
- Barnabe Barnes – Parthenophil and Parthenophone
- Anthony Chute – Beauty Dishonoured, written under the title of Shore's wife
- Michael Drayton
  - Idea: The Shepherd's Garland
  - The Legend of Piers Gaveston
- William Shakespeare – Venus and Adonis
- Thomas Watson (posthumously, as T. W.) – The Tears of Fancie, or Love Disdained (sonnets)

== Births ==
- April 3 – George Herbert, Welsh-born poet (died 1633)
- May 20 – Salomo Glassius, German theologian (died 1656)
- Unknown date – Robert Creighton, Scottish classicist, politician and bishop (died 1672)
- Approximate year – Aodh Buidhe Mac an Bhaird (Hugh Ward), Irish poet and hagiographer (died 1635)

== Deaths ==
- January 12 – Amadis Jamyn, French poet (born 1538)
- February 6 – Jacques Amyot, French translator (born 1513)
- May 30 – Christopher Marlowe, English dramatist and poet (born 1564)
- August 19 – Antonio Veneziano, Italian poet writing in Sicilian (born 1543)
- Unknown date – Chŏng Ch'ŏl, Korean poet and statesman (born 1536)
