= The School of Night (play) =

English play

- Original language: English
- Written by: Peter Whelan
- Subject: Christopher Marlowe and his friends flirt with blasphemy
- Genre: Period piece;
- Setting: Sixteenth century: Scadbury Park and London, England

Premiere
- Date: 1992
- Place: The Other Place, Stratford-upon-Avon

The School of Night is a play by Peter Whelan. It was first performed by the Royal Shakespeare Company at The Other Place, Stratford-upon-Avon on 4 November 1992.

The play takes place between the Summer of 1592 and Spring 1593. It concerns the life of Christopher Marlowe and the mystery surrounding his untimely death during a brawl in Deptford, set against a backdrop of a politically and religiously divided England where the state and its spies watch those who may be accused of sedition, treason and blasphemy.

== Characters ==
- Christopher Marlowe
- Thomas Walsingham
- Audrey Walsingham
- Tom Stone (William Shakespeare)
- Thomas Kyd
- Nicholas Skeres
- Ingram Frizer
- Walter Raleigh
- Rosalinda Benotti
- Robert Poley
- Officer of the Watch

== Plot ==
=== Act One ===
In Scadbury Park, the home of Thomas Walsingham, Marlowe engages in a mock incantation to his personal deity Dog. He discusses his religious scepticism with Walsingham and Kyd. They introduce an actor called Tom Stone who will be performing for them in tandem with Rosalinda, a mixed-race Italian actress who is in love with Marlowe. Marlowe and Rosalinda are suspicious of Stone, who asks a lot of questions. Rosalinda is convinced she has seen him before. Walter Raleigh arrives to witness the performance. They discuss art, politics and religion while watching Stone and Rosalinda act in a risqué satire written by Marlowe. Afterwards Stone queries Kyd about the ‘school of night’, an allegedly atheistic and subversive secret society to which Raleigh, Walsingham and Marlowe belonged. Kyd tells Stone that it was supposed to have promoted republicanism. He also tells him about Marlowe's early career as a spy. Marlowe and Rosalinda reappear and confront Stone. They have discovered that his real name is Shakespeare, author of the Henry VI plays. He explains that he is using a stage name, but they are unconvinced. Shakespeare tells Marlowe he is working on a poem, Venus and Adonis. Marlowe is surprised by the similarity to his own new project Hero and Leander. Kyd decides to leave Scadbury.

A day later: Shakespeare has been in bed with Rosalinda. Marlowe enters and reads some lines from Shakespeare’s new poem. He is disturbed by its power. He and Shakespeare discuss literature. Walsingham informs Marlowe that his indiscreet declarations of heretical opinions can get them all in trouble. Raleigh has already been arrested on the unrelated charge of marrying illegally, but they are all coming under suspicion. In London Skeres and Poley burst into Kyd’s rooms and arrest him, looking for documents believed to be held by Marlowe on the 'school of night'.

=== Act Two ===
A commedia dell'arte performance is held at Scadbury. Shakespeare argues that opinion gets in the way of art. Marlowe is disconcerted by Shakespeare's views. Horsemen arrive to arrest Marlowe.

In London, Marlowe is visited in prison by Raleigh who tells him he has been denounced as a blasphemer. Raleigh says he can free Marlowe, but he wants to be sure that Marlowe has no incriminating records of the meetings of the school of night. Marlowe insists there are none. He is freed.

In the Rose theatre Shakespeare reads one of the Dark Lady sonnets he has written about Rosalinda. They are hiding there with Marlowe. Skeres and Poley arrive. Shakespeare attempts to fight them, but Marlowe assures him they are friends. They tell Marlowe that they have a plan to get him away. They will meet at Deptford, where they will have a body resembling Marlowe. They will claim he drowned in the river, while Marlowe escapes overseas. Marlowe tells Rosalinda that he has hidden the records of the school of night at Scadbury. She is to get them and then meet him in Venice. Shakespeare is suspicious of the escape plan, and suggests that Marlowe travel by another route. However, he agrees to allow Marlowe's 'posthumous' works to be published in his name.

At Deptford, Marlowe, Frizer, Poley and Skeres discover that the man whose body they have been given died from a stab wound. They decide to improvise a new plan according to which Marlowe will be killed in a fight. Frizer will be the killer and the others will say he acted in self-defence. Marlowe is now very suspicious. He abuses Frizer and threatens him with a knife. He forces Skeres to swear that there is no plan to kill him. Frizer, infuriated, twists Marlowe's arm back, stabbing him with his own knife. Skeres and Poley are horrified. Marlowe dies.

Shakespeare and Rosalinda visit Marlowe's grave in Deptford. Rosalinda is still convinced that all went as planned and she will meet Marlowe in Venice. Shakespeare says she must prepare herself for the possibility that Marlowe is dead.

== Commentary ==
In Shakespeare Survey, Jill L. Levinson, says that Whelan creates an "elusive Shakespeare, gifted and influential" and that the play weaves together references to "more than half a dozen scripts from Henry VI to Othello." The Hollywood Reporter complained that the play was far too heavy on exposition, but that "Whelan does capture the spasms of desperation which seize the seeming cabal of doomed and threatened dramatists as they careen through history's obscure plots and even more obscure subplots. If Whelan's version of Marlowe were intended to be a James Bond of the late 16th century, however, it misses the mark by a wide margin." Ian Shuttleworth for City Limits also complained about the expositions: "Half the evening seems given over to brute exposition, with characters informing each other of developments offstage, the byzantine intrigues of court or questions of religion and succession. It felt written for the specific press-night milieu of Stratford habitués."
