= Dolly Walker-Wraight =

British academic

Annie Doris "Dolly" Walker-Wraight (1920 – March 2002) was a British school teacher and writer. Under the name A.D. Wraight, she published in support of the Marlovian theory, the argument that Christopher Marlowe was the true author of William Shakespeare's works.

== Life ==
She earned the Froebel Teachers Diploma in 1958 and worked as a teacher at Dulwich College Preparatory School (1961–1967; 1975–1983) and at the William Tyndale Junior School in Islington, London, (1969–1974). She played a significant role at the start of the educational scandal at the William Tyndale, which culminated in a formal public enquiry in 1975.

== Personal life and death ==
She married journalist and art critic Robert Wraight in 1940; they divorced in 1963. They had a son, Colin Wraight, who became a biochemist and plant biologist, and a daughter, Virginia. She died in March 2002.

== Publications on Marlowe and Shakespeare ==
Her interest in Marlowe began in 1955 when the American writer Calvin Hoffman, who popularized the Marlovian theory, published his book The Man Who Was Shakespeare. She joined the newly formed Marlowe Society and began a drama branch to revive the rarely performed plays of Marlowe and his contemporaries. She served variously as the Society's secretary, editor of its newsletter, Vice-Chair and Chair. She wrote the society's pamphlet seeking to rehabilitate Marlowe's reputation, "The Real Christopher Marlowe".

In 1965, as A. D. Wraight, she published an illustrated biography, In Search of Christopher Marlowe (in collaboration with the American photographer Virginia Stern). In 1993, in Christopher Marlowe and Edward Alleyne, she argued that Marlowe wrote Edward III, generally credited in part to Shakespeare.

Her research into the Marlovian theory centred on an interpretation of Shakespeare's sonnets, which was the focus of her 1994 book The Story that the Sonnets Tell. Building on Archie Webster's approach, she rearranged the sonnets into groups according to their meaning. In place of the usual assumption that most of the sonnets are addressed to a young man (the "Fair Youth"), she put forward a theory that there were at least three young men:

- Henry Wriothesley, 3rd Earl of Southampton, with the first seventeen sonnets being commissioned by Lord Burghley to commemorate his 17th birthday, with the intention of inspiring him to marry Burghley's granddaughter.
- A certain "William Hatcliffe", one of the several candidates to be the Mr. W.H. of the dedication. In this identification, Walker-Wraight follows the arguments of Leslie Hotson.
- Thomas Walsingham, Marlowe's loyal friend.

In 1996 she published Shakespeare: New Evidence, which presents archival discoveries she made with Peter Farey about a spy called Le Doux, who she suggested might be Marlowe.

Walker-Wraight is interviewed in Michael Rubbo's 2001 documentary on scholars who doubt Shakespeare's authorship, Much Ado About Something.

== Publications ==
- (with Virginia F. Stern). In Search of Christopher Marlowe: A Pictorial Biography, London: Mcdonald, 1965, OCLC 1072668741
- "The Real Christopher Marlowe", an open letter to Charles Nicholl. 2nd ed. Chichester, for the Marlowe Society, 1992, OCLC 1005996532
- Christopher Marlowe and Edward Alleyn, Chichester: Hart, 1993, ISBN 9781897763001
- The Story that the Sonnets Tell, London: Hart, 1994, ISBN 9781897763018
- Shakespeare: New Evidence, London: Hart, 1996, ISBN 9781897763087
