= Marlovian theory of Shakespeare authorship =

Fringe theory that Christopher Marlowe was the real author of William Shakespeare's works

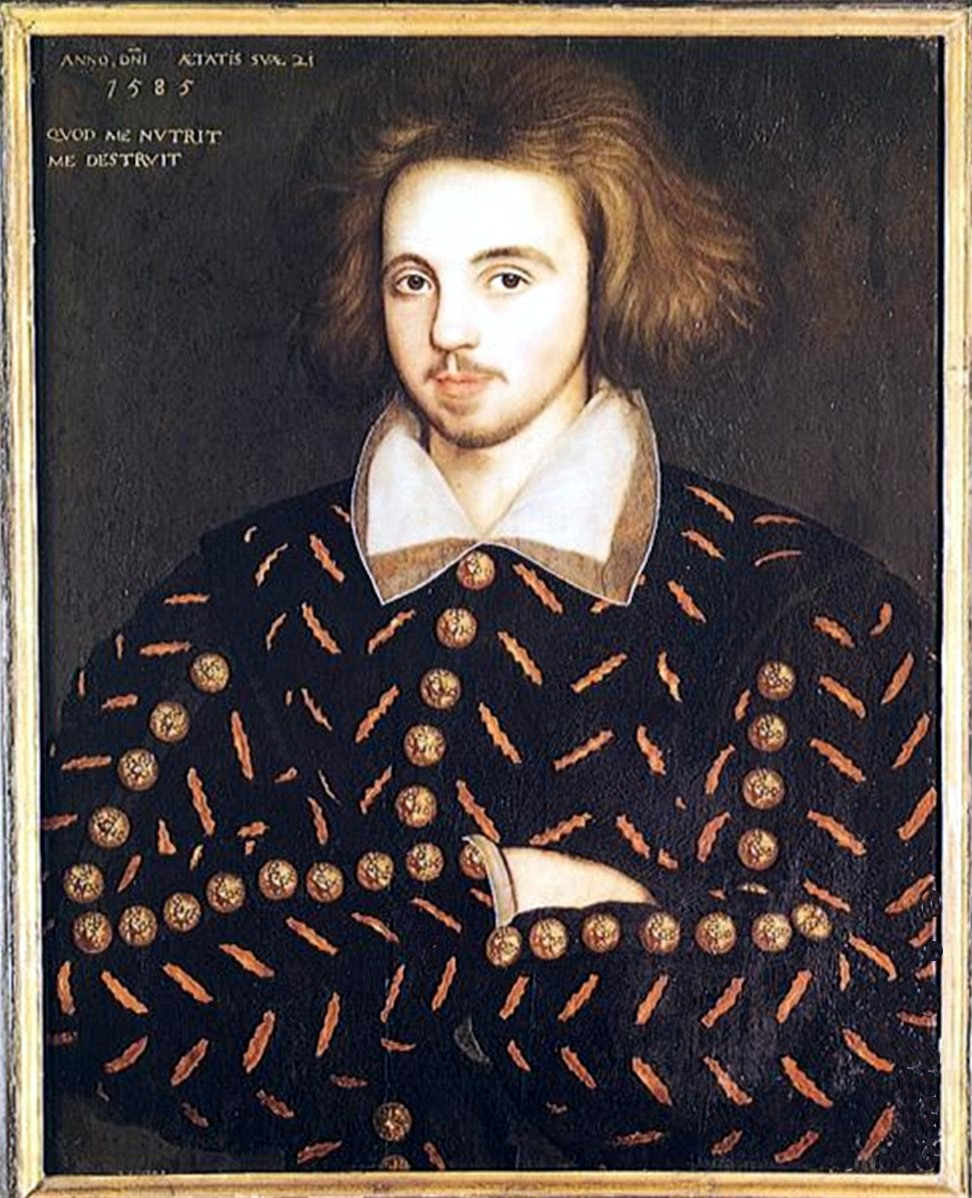
Putative portrait of Christopher Marlowe (Corpus Christi College, Cambridge).

The Marlovian theory of Shakespeare authorship holds that the Elizabethan poet and playwright Christopher Marlowe was the main author of the poems and plays attributed to William Shakespeare. Further, the theory says Marlowe did not die in Deptford on 30 May 1593, as the historical records state, but that his death was faked.

Marlovians (as those who subscribe to the theory are usually called) base their argument on supposed anomalies surrounding Marlowe's reported death and on the significant influence which, according to most scholars, Marlowe's works had on those of Shakespeare. They also point out the coincidence that, despite their having been born only two months apart, the first time the name William Shakespeare is known to have been connected with any literary work was with the publication of Venus and Adonis just a week or two after the death of Marlowe.

The argument against this is that Marlowe's death was accepted as genuine by sixteen jurors at an inquest held by the Queen's personal coroner, that everyone apparently thought that he was dead at the time, and that there is a complete lack of direct evidence supporting his survival beyond 1593. While there are similarities between their works, nonetheless Marlowe's style, vocabulary, imagery, and his apparent weaknesses—particularly in the writing of comedy—are said to be too different from Shakespeare's to be compatible with the claims of the Marlovians. The convergence of documentary evidence of the type used by academics for authorial attribution—title pages, testimony by other contemporary poets and historians, and official records—sufficiently establishes Shakespeare of Stratford's authorship for the overwhelming majority of Shakespeare scholars and literary historians, who consider the Marlovian theory, like all other alternative theories of Shakespeare authorship, a fringe theory.

== Proponents ==
In August 1819 an anonymous writer for The Monthly Review, or Literary Journal suggested that 'Christopher Marlowe' might be a pseudonym assumed for a time by Shakespeare, and this idea was developed further in the same journal in September 1820, noting how Shakespeare "disappears from all biographical research just at the moment when Marlowe first comes on the stage; and who re-appears in his proper name" shortly after the first reports of Marlowe's death. In other words, they argued, just one person was the main author of both the Marlowe and Shakespeare canons.

Marlowe's candidacy was initially suggested by Thomas William White, M.A., in the 1892 book Our English Homer; Or, Shakespeare Historically Considered, as a member of a group of authors. The first person to propose that the works of Shakespeare were primarily by Marlowe was Wilbur G. Zeigler, who presented a case for it in the preface to his 1895 novel, It was Marlowe: a story of the secret of three centuries, which creates an imaginary narrative about how the deception might have occurred. On the tercentenary of Shakespeare's death, in 1916, the Pulitzer prize-winning editor of Louisville's Courier-Journal, Henry Watterson, supported the Marlovian theory also by using a fictional account of how it might have happened. The first essay solely on the subject was written by Archie Webster in 1923. All three were published before Leslie Hotson's discovery in 1925 of the inquest on Marlowe's death, but since then there have nevertheless been several other books supporting the idea, with perhaps the two most influential being those by Calvin Hoffman (1955) and A.D. Wraight (1994). Hoffman's main argument centred on similarities between the styles of the two writers, particularly in the use of similar wordings or ideas—called "parallelisms". Wraight, following Webster, delved more into what she saw as the true meaning of Shakespeare's sonnets.

To their contributions should perhaps also be added that of Michael Rubbo, an Australian documentary film maker who, in 2001, made the TV film Much Ado About Something in which the Marlovian theory was explored in some detail, and the creation in 2009 of the International Marlowe-Shakespeare Society which has continued to draw the theory to the public's attention.

== Marlowe's death ==
As far as is generally accepted by mainstream scholars, Christopher Marlowe died on 30 May 1593 as the result of a knife wound above the right eye inflicted upon him by Ingram Frizer, an acquaintance with whom he had been dining. Together with two other men, Robert Poley and Nicholas Skeres, they had spent that day together at the Deptford home of Eleanor Bull, a respectable widow who apparently offered, for payment, room and refreshment for such private meetings.

As new information has become available over the years, however, the Marlovian argument about Marlowe's death has itself changed from (1) thinking that because, in their view, he later wrote under the name of Shakespeare, his death must have been faked; to (2) challenging the details of the inquest in an attempt to show that it must have been untrue; to (3) claiming that the circumstances surrounding it suggest that the faking is the most likely scenario, whether he went on to write Shakespeare or not.

=== The inquest ===
On 1 June, two days after the reported killing, the inquest was held in the same house by the Coroner of The Queen's Household, William Danby, and a 16-man jury found it to have been in self-defence. The body of this "famous gracer of tragedians", as Robert Greene had called him, is recorded as being buried the same day in the churchyard of St. Nicholas, Deptford, but the exact location of his grave is unknown. The Queen sanctioned Frizer's pardon just four weeks later.

Most scholars would now agree that the official verdict of the inquest was to some extent untrue, concluding that Marlowe's stabbing was not done in self-defence, as claimed by the witnesses, but was a deliberate murder. Of those books or articles written about—or including an explanation of—Marlowe's death over the past twenty years or so, most of the authors believe that the witnesses were probably lying. Usually they suggest that it was a political murder, citing the fact that the two witnesses, Robert Poley and Nicholas Skeres, were or had been agents in the pay of members of the government. Some commentators have found details of the killing itself unconvincing.

There is, however, hardly any agreement as to exactly why such a murder occurred or who was behind it. Marlovians say that this confusion arises from scholars asking the wrong question. Instead of trying to find out why he was killed, they should be asking why those particular people would have met at that particular place on that particular day. The Marlovian theory argues that the most logical reason for that meeting to have taken place would have been to fake his death.

=== Means, motive and opportunity ===
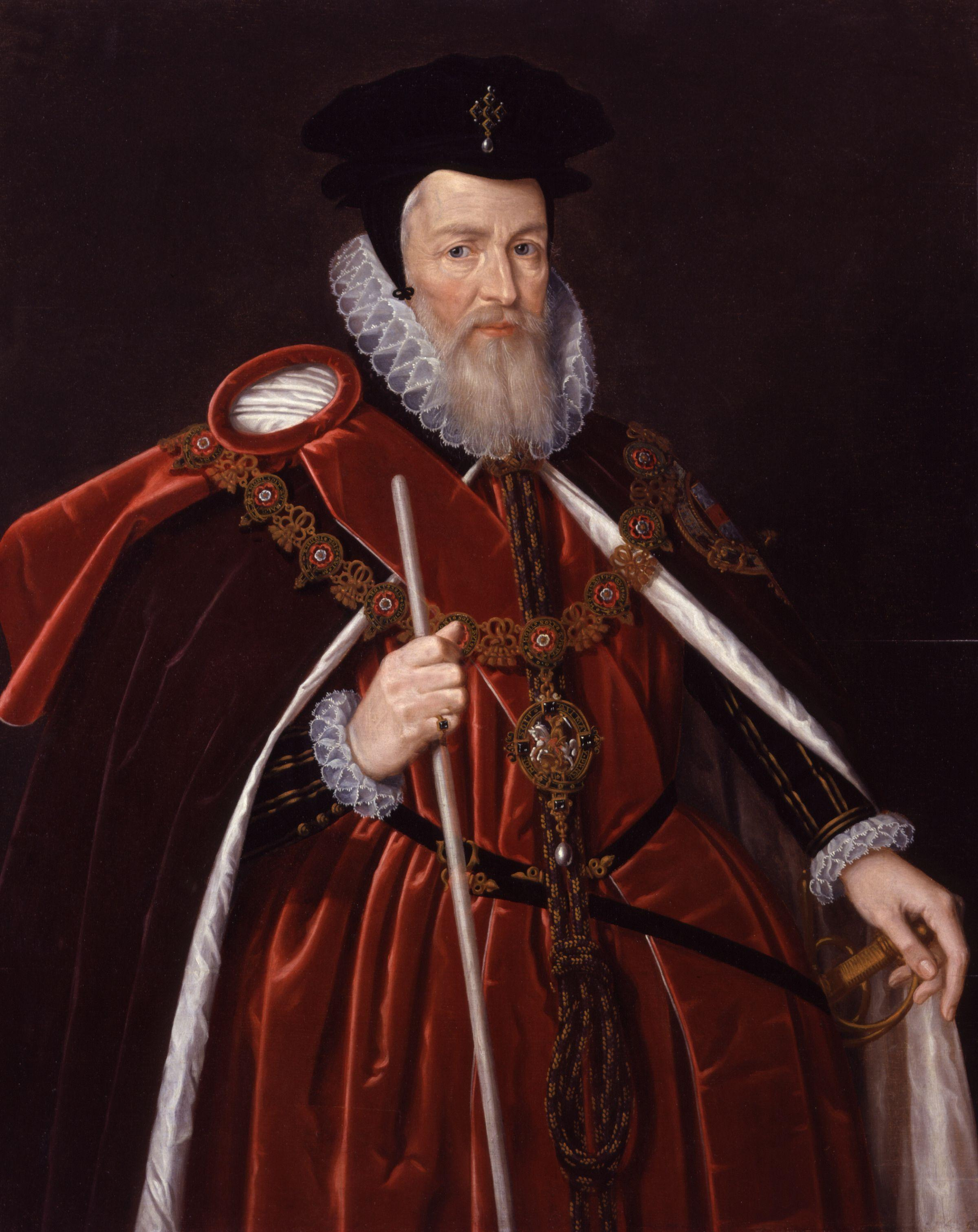
William Cecil, Lord Burghley.

It is generally accepted that Marlowe had been employed in some capacity as a secret agent, either by the late Sir Francis Walsingham or by the Cecils (Lord Burghley and his son Sir Robert Cecil), or both. He could therefore, theoretically at least, call on powerful friends, with all of the means at their disposal to organize a faked death.

He was also in deep trouble at the time. Accusations of his having persuaded others to atheism were coming to the Privy Council thick and fast and, whether true or not, he was certainly suspected of having written an atheistic book which was being used for subversive purposes. For such crimes, trial and execution would have been almost guaranteed. Within the past two months, at least three people, Henry Barrow, John Greenwood and John Penry, had gone to the scaffold for offences no worse than this. Marlovians therefore contend that Marlowe would have had a strong motive for either being complicit in or agreeing to some means of escape.

Most biographers concede that those accusations concerning Marlowe contained in various documents sent to the Privy Council at the time were very serious. It is therefore surprising that, despite the initial summons for his arrest being on 18 May, he was apparently still at liberty on 30 May to attend the Deptford meeting. Whatever the reason for this, it would have certainly given the opportunity for a faked death to be organized and carried out, if the Marlovians are right in claiming that this is what happened.

=== The witnesses ===
Marlovians suggest it is significant that every person involved in the incident seems to have been associated in one way or another either with his friend and patron Thomas Walsingham (Frizer and Skeres) or with his employers the Cecils (Poley, Bull and Danby). They point to the lengthy period (10 hours) in which the four men remained together at Eleanor Bull's house that day, and suggest this seems unnecessary if the intent had been simply to dispose of Marlowe. The most likely reason for the get-together, they say, would have been to save him in some way from the peril facing him. They claim that the faking of his death fits more of the facts as known than any other scenario.

=== The coroner ===
Support for the possible involvement of people in high places (whether it was to have Marlowe assassinated or to fake his death) has recently come to light with the discovery that the inquest was probably illegal. The inquest should have been supervised and enrolled by the local County Coroner, with the Queen's Coroner being brought in by him only if he happened to know that it was within 12 (Tudor) miles of where the Queen was in residence (i.e. that it was "within the verge") and, if so, for it to be run by both of them jointly. Marlovians argue that therefore the only way for Danby to have finished up doing it on his own—given that it was only just within the verge, the Court in fact some 16 of today's statute miles away by road—would be because he knew about the killing before it actually occurred, and just "happened" to be there to take charge. If there was a deception, they say, Danby must have been involved in it and thus almost certainly with the tacit approval of the Queen. This does, of course, give as much support to David Riggs's theory that the Queen ordered Marlowe's death as it does to the faked death theory.

=== The body ===
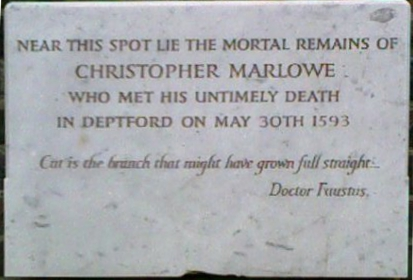
The body was buried in an unmarked grave in the churchyard of St Nicholas, Deptford. The plaque shown here is modern.

Marlovians argue that if Frizer, Poley and Skeres could lie about what happened, they could just as easily have been lying about the identity of the corpse itself. In other words, that although they claimed it was Marlowe's—and as far as we know they were the only ones there in a position to identify him—it was in fact someone else's body that the jury was called upon to examine.

If a death is to be faked, however, a substitute body has to be found, and it was David A. More who first identified for Marlovians a far more likely "victim" than had been suggested earlier. On the evening before their 10 a.m. meeting at Deptford, at a most unusual time for a hanging, John Penry, about a year older than Marlowe, was hanged (for writing subversive literature) just two miles from Deptford, and there is no record of what happened to the body. Also of possible relevance is that the same William Danby would have been responsible for authorizing exactly what was to happen to Penry's corpse. Those who reject the theory claim that there would have been far too many obvious signs that the corpse had been hanged for it to have been used in this way, although Marlovians say that Danby, being solely in charge, would have been able quite easily to ensure that such evidence remained hidden from the jury.

However, this remains a fringe view within academia. In his Shakespeare and Co., referring to the documentation concerning Marlowe's death, Stanley Wells reflects the view of virtually all scholars that Marlowe did die then when he wrote: "The unimpugnable documentary evidence deriving from legal documents ... makes this one of the best recorded episodes in English literary history" and "Even before these papers turned up there was ample evidence that Marlowe died a violent death in Deptford in 1593."

== Marlowe and Shakespeare ==
=== The "Shakespeare" argument ===
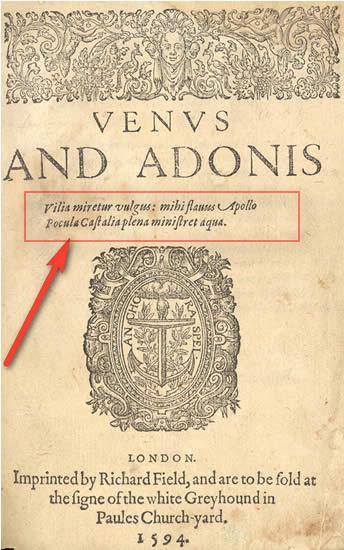
Two Latin lines (arrow) from Ovid's Amores, which Marlowe had completely translated into English years earlier, on the title page of the first printed work of Shakespeare (1593), here reprinted in 1594

The mainstream or Stratfordian view is that the author known as "Shakespeare" was identical to the William Shakespeare who was born in Stratford-upon-Avon in 1564, moved to London and became an actor, and "sharer" (part-owner) of the acting company called the Lord Chamberlain's Men, which owned the Globe Theatre and the Blackfriars Theatre. In contrast, Marlovians argue that this William Shakespeare was only a "front" for the real author, and that any evidence supporting him as the true author can be just as easily explained by this version of events.

A central plank in the Marlovian theory is that the first clear association of William Shakespeare with the works bearing his name was just 13 days after Marlowe's supposed death. Shakespeare's first published work, Venus and Adonis, was registered with the Stationers' Company on 18 April 1593, with no named author, and appears to have been on sale—now with his name included—by 12 June, when a copy is first known to have been bought.

Their argument remains highly contentious and no mainstream scholar of Shakespeare's life and work currently accepts it. Stanley Wells summarizes the reasons why Shakespearean scholars in general utterly reject any such idea: "All of this [documentary evidence of his death] compounds the initial and inherent ludicrousness of the idea that he went on to write the works of William Shakespeare while leaving not the slightest sign of his continuing existence for at least twenty years. During this period he is alleged to have produced a string of masterpieces which must be added to those he had already written, which no one in the busy and gossipy world of the theatre knew to be his, and for which he was willing to allow his Stratford contemporary to receive all the credit and to reap all the rewards."

=== Internal evidence ===
==== Style ====
Much has been made—particularly by Calvin Hoffman—of so-called "parallelisms" between the two authors. For example, when Marlowe's "Jew of Malta", Barabas, sees Abigail on a balcony above him, he says

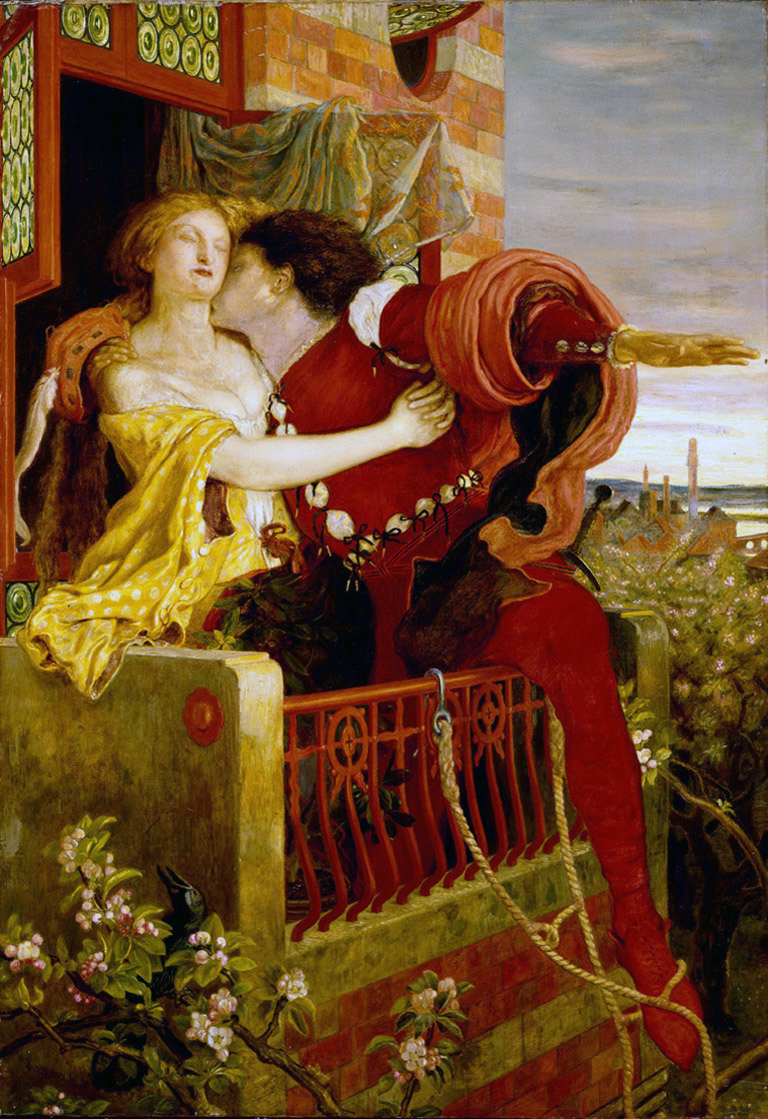
An 1870 oil painting by Ford Madox Brown depicting Romeo and Juliet's balcony scene

But stay! What star shines yonder in the east?
The lodestar of my life, if Abigail!

Most people would immediately recognize how similar this is to Romeo's famous

But soft! What light through yonder window breaks?
It is the East, and Juliet is the sun!

when she appears on the balcony above. There are many such examples, but the problem with using them as an argument is that it really is not possible to be sure whether they happened because they were by the same author, or because they were—whether consciously or unconsciously—simply copied by Shakespeare from Marlowe. It is worth noting, however, that Marlowe is the only contemporary dramatist from whom Shakespeare appears to 'copy' so much, and that the influence Marlowe had on Shakespeare is universally acknowledged.

With stylometric approaches it is possible to identify certain characteristics which are very typical of Shakespeare, such as the use of particular poetic techniques or the frequency with which various common words are used, and these have been used to argue that Marlowe could not have written Shakespeare's works. In every case so far where these data have been plotted over time, however, Marlowe's corpus has been found to fit just where Shakespeare's would have been, had he written anything before the early 1590s as all of Marlowe's were. On the other hand, whereas stylometry might be useful in discerning where two sets of work are not by the same person, it can be used with less confidence to show that they are. This was something that T.C. Mendenhall, whose work some Marlovians have nevertheless thought proves their theory, was at pains to point out.

As for the less quantifiable differences—mainly to do with the content, and of which there are quite a lot—Marlovians suggest that they are quite predictable, given that under their scenario Marlowe would have undergone a significant transformation of his life—with new locations, new experiences, new learning, new interests, new friends and acquaintances, possibly a new political agenda, new paymasters, new performance spaces, new actors, and maybe (not all agree on this) a new collaborator, Shakespeare himself.

==== Shakespeare's Sonnets ====
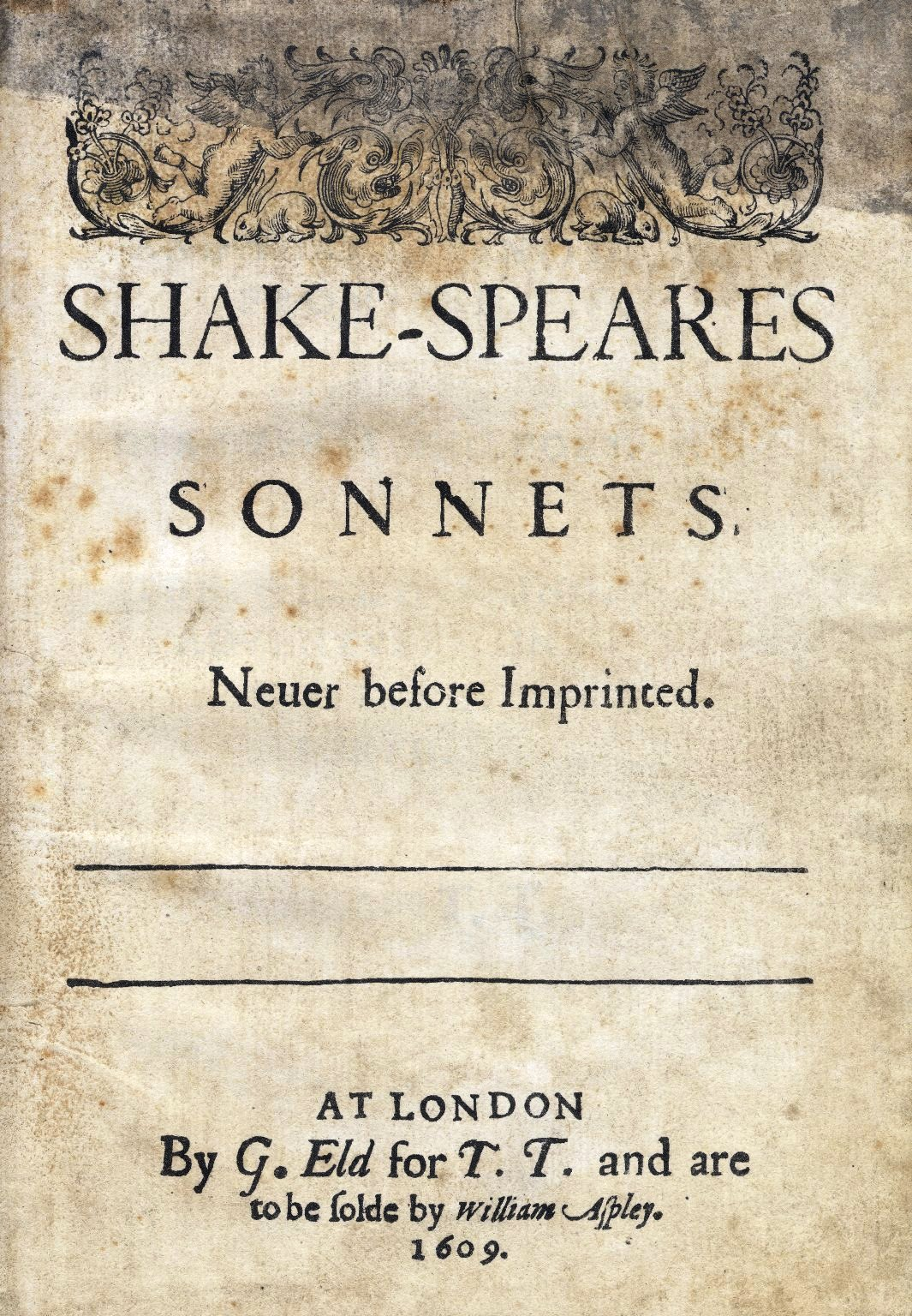
Cover of the 1609 quarto edition of the Sonnets.

The current preference among Shakespearean scholars is to deny that the Sonnets are autobiographical. Marlovians say that this is because—other than the references to his name "Will" and a possible pun on "Hathaway"—there is no connection between what is said in the Sonnets and anything that is known about Shakespeare's life. In contrast, assuming that Marlowe did survive and was exiled in disgrace, Marlovians claim that the Sonnets reflect what must have happened to him after that.

In Sonnet 25, for instance, a Marlovian interpretation would note that something unforeseen ("unlooked for") has happened to the poet, which will deny him the chance to boast of "public honour and proud titles", and which seems to have led to some enforced travel far away, possibly even overseas (26–28, 34, 50–51, 61). They would note that this going away seems to be a one-off event (48), and whatever it was, it is clearly also associated with his being "in disgrace with fortune and men's eyes", his "outcast state" (29), and his "blots" and "bewailed guilt" (36). The poet also says that he has been "made lame by fortune's dearest spite" (37). Each one of these segments, along with many other throughout the Sonnets, might be seen by a Marlovian as reflecting some aspect of Marlowe's alleged faked death and subsequent life.

Marlovians also claim that their interpretation allows more of Shakespeare's actual words to be interpreted as meaning literally what they say than is otherwise possible. For example, they can take "a wretch's knife" (74) to mean a wretch's knife, rather than assume that he must have really meant Old Father Time's scythe, take an "outcast state" (29) to mean an outcast state, not just a feeling that nobody likes him, and accept that when he says his "name receives a brand" (111) it means that his reputation has been permanently damaged, and not simply that acting is considered a somewhat disreputable profession. Jonathan Bate nevertheless gives reasons for Shakespeare scholars claiming that "Elizabethans did not write coded autobiography".

==== Clues in the plays ====
Faked (or wrongly presumed) death, disgrace, banishment, and changed identity are of course major ingredients in Shakespeare's plays, and Stephen Greenblatt puts it fairly clearly: "Again and again in his plays, an unforeseen catastrophe...suddenly turns what had seemed like happy progress, prosperity, smooth sailing into disaster, terror, and loss. The loss is obviously and immediately material, but it is also, and more crushingly, a loss of identity. To wind up on an unknown shore, without one’s friends, habitual associates, familiar network—this catastrophe is often epitomized by the deliberate alteration or disappearance of the name and, with it, the alteration or disappearance of social status."

Whilst noting the obvious relevance of this to their own proposed scenario Marlovians do not seek multiple parallels between Marlowe's known or predicted life and these stories, believing that the plays are so rich in plot devices that such parallels can be found with numerous individuals. On the other hand, there are some places where they point out how difficult it is to know just why something was included if it were not some sort of in-joke for those who were privy to something unknown to most of us.

For example, when in The Merry Wives of Windsor (3.1) Evans is singing Marlowe's famous song "Come live with me..." to keep his spirits up, why does he mix it up with words based upon Psalm 137 "By the rivers of Babylon...", perhaps the best known song of exile ever written?

And in As You Like It (3.3), Touchstone's words "When a man's verses cannot be understood, nor a man's good wit seconded with the forward child, understanding, it strikes a man more dead than a great reckoning in a little room", apparently referring to Marlowe's death, are puzzled over by many of Shakespeare's biographers. As Agnes Latham puts it, "nobody explains why Shakespeare should think that Marlowe's death by violence was material for a stage jester."

=== External evidence ===
The main case against the 'faked death' theory is that, whilst there is evidence for Marlowe's death, there is no equally unequivocal counter-evidence that he survived, or did anything more than exert a considerable influence on Shakespeare. So far the only external evidence offered has been in the form of claiming that someone who was alive after 1593 must have been Marlowe, or finding concealed messages on Shakespeare's grave, etc.

==== Identity after 1593 ====
Illustration for the 1916 newspaper article by Henry Watterson supporting the Marlovian theory.

Various people have been suggested as having really been the Christopher Marlowe who was supposed to have died in 1593. Some examples are a Hugh Sanford, who was based with the Earl of Pembroke at Wilton House in Wiltshire and a Christopher Marlowe (alias John Matthews, or vice versa) who surfaced in Valladolid in 1602, and a Monsieur Le Doux, a spy for Essex, but working as a "French tutor" in Rutland in 1595. Henry Watterson's almost certainly fictional account of an Englishman called Marlowe who died in Padua in 1627 has nevertheless triggered research by some Marlovians among the Paduan archives, without finding any confirmation so far. And if Don Foster's hypothesis is correct that the "begetter" of the Sonnets may have meant the poet himself, then Marlovians would point out that "Mr. W.H." might not have been a misprint, as Foster suggests, but merely showed that the identity being used by Marlowe in 1609 (including the name "Will"?) most probably had those initials too.

==== Hidden messages ====
Many anti-Stratfordians search for hidden messages in the form of acrostics and transposition ciphers, although this approach is not so popular with Marlovians.

Peter Bull nevertheless claims to have found such a hidden message deeply concealed in the Sonnets, and at least two Marlovians—William Honey and Roberta Ballantine—have taken the famous four-line "curse" on Shakespeare's grave to be an anagram, however coming up with different messages. Anagrams as such are useful for conveying hidden messages, including claims of priority and authorship, having been used in this way, for example, by Galileo and Huygens; however, given the number of possible answers, they are really of use only if there can be some confirmation from the originator that this was the answer intended.

Another method for finding hidden messages lies in interpreting passages that could be construed as ambiguous, since a favourite technique of the poet/dramatists of the time was irony, the double meaning or double entendre. For example, orthodox scholars often cite the poems in the First Folio as evidence for Shakespeare, such as Jonson's introductory poem describing the engraved portrait as having "hit his face" well, his eulogy that calls Shakespeare "sweet Swan of Avon", and Digges's line that refers to when "Time dissolves thy Stratford monument". Yet Marlovians say that those can each be interpreted in quite different ways. The "face", according to the Oxford English Dictionary (10.a) could mean an "outward show; assumed or factitious appearance; disguise, pretence".

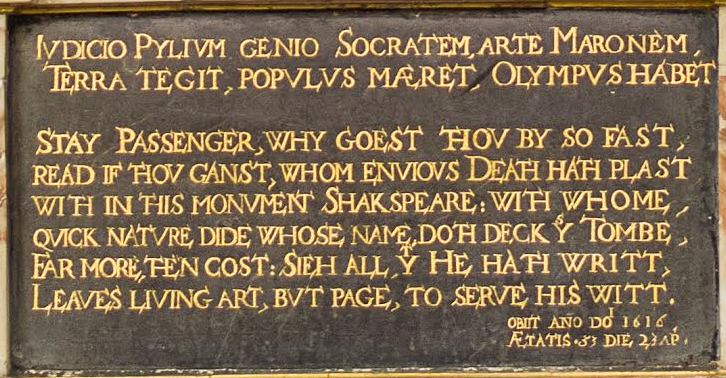
The inscription on Shakespeare's monument

When Jonson writes of "Swan of Avon", we may choose to take it as meaning the Avon that runs through Stratford, or we may think of Daniel's Delia, addressed to the mother of the First Folio's two dedicatees, in which he refers to the Avon in Wiltshire where they all lived:

But Avon rich in fame, though poor in waters,
Shall have my song, where Delia hath her seat.

And, when Digges writes "And Time dissolves thy Stratford monument", one Marlovian argument says that it is quite reasonable to assume that he is really saying that Time will eventually "solve, resolve or explain" it (O.E.D. 12), which becomes very relevant when we see that—whether the author intended it or not—the whole poem on Shakespeare's monument ("Stay Passenger...") may be re-interpreted as inviting us to solve a puzzle revealing who is "in" the monument "with" Shakespeare. The apparent answer turns out to be "Christofer Marley"—as Marlowe is known to have spelt his own name—who, the poem would then say, with Shakespeare's death no longer has a "page" to dish up his wit.

== The Hoffman Prize ==
Calvin Hoffman, author of The Man Who Was Shakespeare (1955), died in 1986, still absolutely convinced that Marlowe was the true author of Shakespeare's works. Anxious that the theory should not die with him, he left a substantial sum of money with the King's School, Canterbury—where Marlowe went as a boy—for them to administer an annual essay competition on this subject. The Trust Deed stipulated that the winning essay should be the one:

which in the opinion of the King's School most convincingly authoritatively and informatively examines and discusses in depth the life and works of Christopher Marlowe and the authorship of the plays and poems now commonly attributed to William Shakespeare with particular regard to the possibility that Christopher Marlowe wrote some or all of those poems and plays or made some inspirational creative or compositional contributions towards the authorship of them. [emphasis added]

The adjudication of the prize, which as of 2019 was around £9,000, has always been delegated to an eminent professional Shakespearean scholar and, despite Hoffman's clear intentions, the winning essay has seldom espoused the Marlovian cause, the prize having usually gone to essays along entirely orthodox lines. A further stipulation of the initial Trust Deed was that:

If in any year the person adjudged to have won the Prize has in the opinion of The King's School furnished irrefutable and incontrovertible proof and evidence required to satisfy the world of Shakespearian scholarship that all the plays and poems now commonly attributed to William Shakespeare were in fact written by Christopher Marlowe then the amount of the Prize for that year shall be increased by assigning to the winner absolutely one half of the capital or corpus of the entire Trust Fund...

== In fiction ==
Apart from the stories by Zeigler and Watterson, others have used Marlovian theory as an inspiration for fiction as well. Rodney Bolt's History Play (2005) was inspired partly by Mark Twain's writings. It portrays Marlowe as being the true author of Shakespeare's works after staging his own death.

In The Marlowe Papers (published in 2012), a novel by Ros Barber, Marlowe's "death" is a ruse, and he writes plays under the Shakespeare name. The novel is written in blank verse and won the Hoffman Prize in 2011 and the Desmond Elliott Prize in 2013.

In the 2012 movie Only Lovers Left Alive, Marlowe is portrayed as a vampire who mentions he wrote Hamlet, and wishes he based the character on his son-in-law instead.

Ben Elton's 2016 sitcom Upstart Crow inverts the Marlovian theory. In the series, Marlowe is a spy and Shakespeare is persuaded to write plays for him (including Doctor Faustus, Tamburlaine, The Jew of Malta, and Edward II) in order to maintain Marlowe's cover as a playwright.
