= Nicholas Skeres =

English con-man and government agent

Nicholas Skeres (March 1563 – c. 1601) was an Elizabethan con-man and government informer—i.e. a "professional deceiver"—and one of the three "gentlemen" who were with the poet and playwright Christopher Marlowe when he was killed in Deptford in May 1593. Together with another of the men there, Robert Poley, he had played a part in the discovery of the Babington Plot against the life of the Queen in 1586, and at the time of Marlowe's death was engaged in a money-lending swindle with the third of them, Marlowe's reported killer Ingram Frizer.

== Early life ==
Skeres was born the second son of a merchant tailor, Nicholas Skeres senior, in March 1563, probably in the family's parish of All-Hallows-the-Less, near London Bridge. His father died when he was only three years old, however, leaving each of his two sons and his widow a third of his estate. In fact this included land in Yorkshire, the Skeres or Skyeres family having once lived at Skyeres Hall near Wentworth.

Despite his father's occupation, neither he nor his brother went to the Merchant Taylors' School, although according to the School's register, their cousin Ralph Skeres junior did attend in 1564. On the other hand, he does seem to have been a law student at Furnival's Inn, one of the Inns of Chancery, which would imply a reasonable level of education, and the relationships he apparently established with several well-known writers including Marlowe, would suggest it too.

On 7 July 1585, writing to Lord Burghley, William Fleetwood mentioned a "Nicholas Skeeres" among a number of "maisterles men & cut-purses, whose practice is to robbe Gentlemen's chambers and Artificers' shoppes in and about London". However, as Charles Nicholl argues, it seems unlikely that such a man would be employed in important government business as this Nicholas Skeres appears to have been a year later.

== Confidence trickster ==
In April 1593, Skeres was called before the Court of Star Chamber as a witness in the case of Smith vs Wolfall, in which the skinner Wolfall was accused of obtaining money under false pretences. Skeres had lured Smith into Wolfall's clutches, a role he admitted to having undertaken many times before over the past ten or twelve years. Wolfall's victims apparently included Matthew Royden, George Chapman and Thomas Lodge. In fact Skeres's association with loan sharks seems to have even gone back to his early teens, although he claimed that he had only ever done this under duress. A month after this appearance, however, he was engaged in exactly the same activity on behalf of Ingram Frizer, and his gulling of a young man called Drew Woodleff.

== Government agent ==
It has been suggested that a man called "Skeggs", known to have been in the company of Sir Francis Walsingham's young relative Thomas Walsingham in France in 1581, was this Nicholas Skeres. Whether this is true or not, there is little doubt that he was involved in Sir Francis's disclosure of the 1586 Babington plot with Thomas Walsingham and Robert Poley. Here is how Charles Nicholl describes it. "(T)wo of Babington's 'crew' ... had been seen there: 'Dunn' and 'Skyeres'. Dunn is Henry Dunne, who was among those executed the following month. 'Skyeres'—a spelling he uses in his signature—is almost certainly Nicholas Skeres. It looks like he was there as a government plant. He was recognized by (Sir Francis) Walsingham's watchers, and was named without further comment in (the) report. His name does not figure among those later arrested. He quietly drops from the story, almost certainly because he was Walsingham's man all along."

In 1589 Skeres was also paid on a warrant signed by Sir Francis Walsingham for the carrying of confidential letters between the Earl of Essex (in Exeter) and the court.

== Witness of Christopher Marlowe's death ==
In 1925, Leslie Hotson discovered details of the inquest on the death of the famous poet/dramatist, Christopher Marlowe, in the house of Eleanor Bull in Deptford, at which Nicholas Skeres was one of the three "gentlemen" also present. The report itself tells us that one of them, Ingram Frizer, having been attacked by Marlowe from behind because of a dispute over payment of the bill (the "reckoning"), killed him in self-defence by stabbing him over the right eye. Skeres and the other man, government agent Robert Poley—with whom Skeres had worked on exposing the Babington plot—testified that they were sitting on either side of Frizer in such a manner that he "in no wise could take flight" when Marlowe attacked him.

Although some biographers still accept the story told at the inquest as a true account, the majority nowadays find it hard to believe, and suggest that it was a deliberate murder, even though there is little agreement as to just who was behind it or their motive for such a course of action. The Marlovian theory even argues that the most logical reason for those people to have been there at that time was to fake Marlowe's death, allowing him to escape almost certain trial and execution for his seditious atheism.

== Skeres and the Earl of Essex ==
It is not clear exactly who it was that Skeres was serving when carrying the messages between Essex and the court in 1589, but there is no doubt that he became a servant of the former when he went to France with Essex as a member of his expeditionary force to Normandy in 1591/2. During his appearance in 1593 before the Star Chamber—of which Essex was a new member—he was still referring to the Earl as his "lord and master".

In an undated letter from Skeres to Essex's right-hand man Gelly Meyrick, he indicates that he is for some reason no longer in the Earl's good books, and seeks Meyrick's help in returning to the Earl's service. He insists that he intends to amend his previous ways (which seems to refer to his touting for loan sharks) which suggests a date after 1593 and before 1596 (because the "Mr. Meyrick" to whom he wrote became "Sir Gelly" Meyrick in 1596). In this case, the letter seems to have worked, since (as Hotson puts it) "'Nicholas Kyrse, alias Skeers, servant to the Earl of Essex' was arrested on 13 March 1594/5 by Sir Richard Martin, Alderman, "in a very dangerous company" at the house of Edmund Williamson. Nicholl puts this in context, however. "It is decided 'to discharge all the persons committed that gave us good account of their dealings'. Skeres was among those released" and "Skeres's presence in (Williamson's) house suggests his use of 'brokery' as a cover for political surveillance". Edmund Williamson's brother, Nicholas, "had been 'apprehended for treason' a few days earlier."

That Skeres continued to serve the Earl of Essex seems fairly likely, as the last time we hear of him is on 31 July 1601, after the failure of the Essex Rebellion, when Skeres was arrested along with other Essex supporters. The Privy Council issued warrants to the Keeper of the prison at Newgate for "the removal of Nicholas Skiers and --- Farmer, prisoners in his custodie, unto Bridewell". As was so often the case with Bridewell prison's political prisoners, nothing is heard of him after that date.
