= Wilbur G. Zeigler =

- Born: 1857
- Died: January 30, 1923; San Francisco, California, US
- Occupations: Writer; Lawyer
- Years active: 1882-1906
- Notable work: It Was Marlowe; The Heart of the Alleghanies

Signature
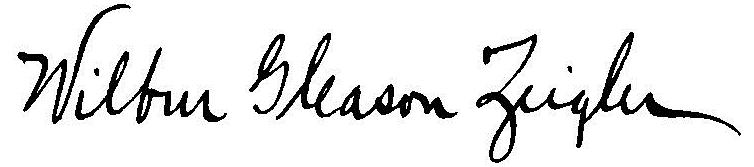

Wilbur Gleason Zeigler (1857–1923) was a lawyer and writer who is best known for founding the Marlovian theory of Shakespeare authorship in the preface and notes to his 1895 novel It Was Marlowe. He also wrote on the history of Ohio, the culture of North Carolina, and the San Francisco earthquake of 1906, of which he was a survivor.

== Early career ==
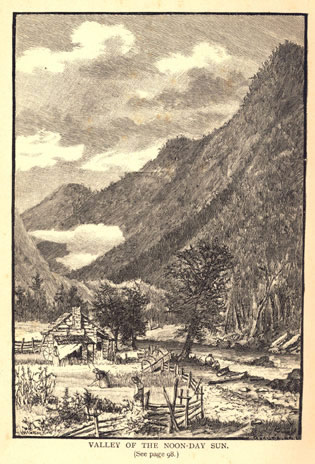
illustration from The Heart of the Alleghanies depicting "Campbell's lowly cabin in the center of the narrow corn-fields" beside the "limpid" Nantahala River

Zeigler was born near Fremont, Ohio in 1857. His father, Henry Zeigler, was of German ancestry. His mother, Elizabeth Gorham (née Gleason), was a descendant of Thomas Fitch. Zeigler studied law in Cleveland, Ohio, and in 1881 was admitted to the bar. He joined in a partnership with R. P. Buckland and H. S. Buckland, but after a year left to develop an interest in literature.

Zeigler contributed historical material to the History of Sandusky County Ohio (1882). He also travelled through North Carolina with fellow lawyer Ben S. Grosscup to research their jointly written book The Heart of the Alleghanies; or, Western North Carolina. It was published in 1883.

In 1883, Zeigler settled in San Francisco, and returned to legal work, concentrating on civil law. Eventually he formed the partnership Galpin & Zeigler.

== Marlovian theory ==
Zeigler returned to literature with his novel It was Marlowe: a Story of the Secret of Three Centuries, (1895). In the preface to the book Zeigler commented on the then-popular Baconian theory that Francis Bacon was the true author Shakespeare's works. He argued that the two authors were very different, and put forward his alternative suggestion that Christopher Marlowe, who is recorded to have been killed in a fight in 1593, faked his death. He pointed out that accounts of the death were very inconsistent and that no evidence had ever been found concerning his mysterious killer. He noted similarities between Marlowe's and Shakespeare's styles and the fact that the latter's career began almost simultaneously with the end of Marlowe's in 1593. Zeigler dealt with the anticipated objection that, unlike Shakespeare, there is little humour in Marlowe's work, by referring to the comic scenes in Doctor Faustus. He also noted that Shakespeare's own name first appears on plays in 1598 with the publication of Love's Labour's Lost and that John Aubrey later wrote that Ben Jonson "killed Mr. Marlow, ye poet, on Bunhill, coming from the Green Curtain play house" in the same year. Zeigler suggests that the two events are linked and that Marlowe survived until 1598 when Jonson may have killed him. In the novel, Zeigler creates a fictional narrative about how the deception may have occurred and why there appear to be two reported dates for Marlowe's death. He also puts arguments about similarities between Marlowe's work and Shakespeare's into the mouths of Ben Jonson and Thomas Nashe. In footnotes and an appendix Zeigler expands on connections between Marlowe's and Shakespeare's work and suggests that Jonson was behind the 1623 First Folio, in which he thinks he had a financial interest.

=== Plot of It Was Marlowe ===
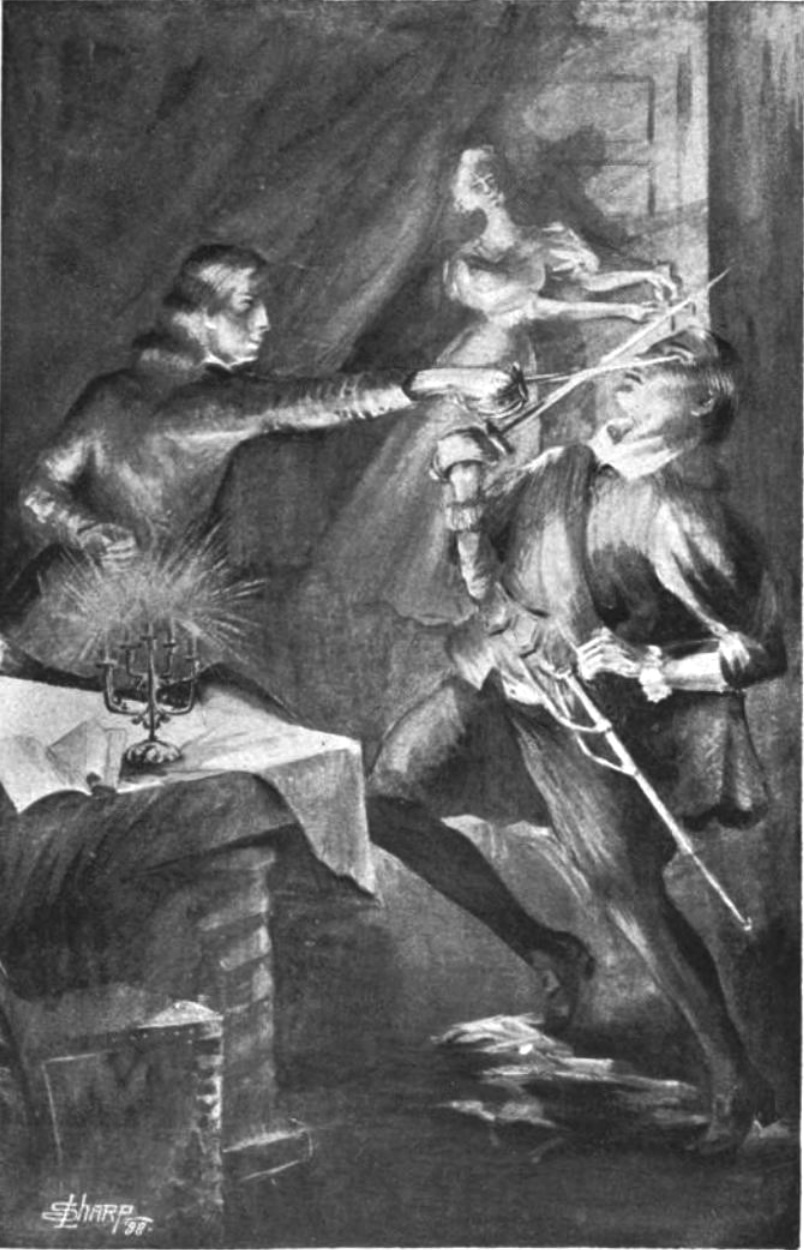
Marlowe kills Frazer, while Anne turns away in horror. Illustration from the novel

Marlowe meets a man who tells him an old girlfriend of Marlowe's called Anne is now unhappily married to a violent man called Francis Frazer. Still in love with her, Marlowe tries to visit Anne in secret, but he and Frazer get into a fight in which the latter is killed. Because the two resemble one another there is initial confusion about who has been killed. Marlowe exchanges clothes with Frazer. Helped by a clever lawyer and his friends William Shakespeare and George Peele Marlowe escapes. At the inquest his friends identify the body as Marlowe's. Meanwhile, Richard Bame, a puritanical Brownist, has accused Marlowe of atheism. Convinced that Marlowe is still alive, he pursues him. The two meet in a church, where Marlowe explains that his 'atheism' is really a belief in a spiritual ideal that transcends church dogma. After a fire is accidentally started in the church when thieves arrive, Bame is arrested as one of the thieves. Marlowe escapes and goes into hiding. Bame's lawyer attempts to track down Marlowe, resulting in another fire in which Marlowe's own lawyer dies. Bame is eventually hanged for theft. After Marlowe writes Titus Andronicus, Shakespeare and Peele pass it off as their own work. The new plays are published anonymously with no problem. Marlowe eventually returns in 1598 in disguise to the Curtain Theatre for a performance of Hamlet. In the audience Ben Jonson and Thomas Nashe express the suspicion that the work is very like Marlowe's, discussing the details of the parallels. Anne in the crowd looks up and recognises her beloved; at the same time Jonson and Nashe see him.

=== Context ===
Zeigler was writing before Leslie Hotson discovered the records of the inquest into the death of Marlowe, identifying his killer as Ingram Frizer. The name "Francis Frazer" derives from a document in the parish book of Deptford, which states that Marlowe was buried there after he was "slain by Francis Frezer". Hotson discovered the records in 1924, and published his findings a year later. Jonson did indeed kill a man in 1598, but it was an actor called Gabriel Spenser. It is usually assumed that Aubrey mixed up the two killings. Gabriel Spenser is briefly mentioned in the novel at the very beginning, as an actor who played the title role in Marlowe's play Edward II. His performance is mentioned again at the end in the dialogue between Jonson and Nashe, but it is never implied that Marlowe has adopted his identity in 1598. Richard Bame is based on Richard Baines, the informer who denounced Marlowe. The claim that he was executed for a crime he may not have committed is derived from surviving evidence concerning the execution of a man of that name.

Zeigler's ideas were picked up by Archie Webster in 1923, who was also writing before Hotson's discovery. The Marlovian theory was later expounded in detail in the light of the known facts by Calvin Hoffman in 1955.

== San Francisco earthquake ==
After the 1906 San Francisco earthquake, Zeigler wrote The Story of the Earthquake and Fire: San Francisco (1906), a first-hand account of the disaster. Zeigler expresses the view that the city will re-emerge in better shape after the disaster, because new public spaces can now be planned and created. The book was republished in 2010. It contains a large number of photographs of San Francisco after the earthquake and some before-and-after comparison images.
