= William Elderton =

William Elderton may refer to:

- William Elderton (ballad writer) (died 1592?), English actor and lawyer
- William Palin Elderton (1877–1962), British actuary
