= William Danby =

William Danby may refer to:

- William Danby (writer)
- William Danby (coroner)
- William Danby (MP) for Appleby (UK Parliament constituency)
