= William Danby (coroner) =

English coroner and lawyer

William Danby (fl. 1542–1593) was a sixteenth-century lawyer and Coroner of the Queen's Household towards the end of the reign of Queen Elizabeth I. He is particularly noted for having presided over the inquest into the controversial death at Deptford in 1593 of the poet/dramatist Christopher Marlowe.

== Lincoln's Inn ==
Although the date of Danby's birth is unknown, he is most probably the William Danby who entered Lincoln's Inn on 1 August 1542. If so, his exact contemporary there was the father of Marlowe's friend and patron Thomas Walsingham, another Thomas, who was born in 1526. Danby was therefore probably in his late sixties at the time of Marlowe's inquest.

== Coroner of The Queen's Household ==
In 1589 Danby apparently took over the role of Coroner of The Queen's Household from Richard Vale. The first time Danby's name appears in this capacity (in the Middlesex records held at the London Metropolitan Archives) was for an inquest held in October 1589—in Shepperton, Middlesex—when he presided together with a county coroner, John Chalkhill, at the inquest on one Robert Wrote. Unfortunately for Danby, this case was later declared "insufficient" because Chalkhill had not said in his report that Shepperton was within the verge, which was legally required to explain Danby's presence there.

We know that Danby's predecessor as the Royal coroner, Richard Vale, was also one of the coroners for Middlesex Unfortunately only a very few (and irrelevant) Kentish inquests survive from that time to provide direct evidence that Danby similarly combined his royal responsibilities with those of a county coroner, and if he had, it should have been noted in his report of Marlowe's inquest, which it was not.

On the other hand, two other pieces of evidence suggest that he may have nevertheless also been a coroner for Kent. The first is that it would have been illegal for him to have presided on his own over the Marlowe inquest, as he did, unless he was also a coroner for Kent, as Deptford was both in Kent and, at the time, within the verge. The other is that Leslie Hotson said that he had found a William Danby in Woolwich (in Kent, four or five miles east of Deptford) at that time, and, although Hotson gave no reference for this claim, William Urry was prepared to acknowledge it as quite likely.

== The Marlowe inquest ==
Had there been no doubts about Danby's report of the inquest jury's verdict on Marlowe's death, the name of William Danby would have probably disappeared by now. Some biographers still accept the story told at the inquest as a true account, but the majority of the more recent ones find the verdict of a killing in self-defence difficult to accept, and think that it must have been a deliberate murder, even though there is no agreement as to who was behind it or just what their motive might have been for arranging it. The Marlovian theory even argues that the most logical reason for those people to have been there at that time was to fake Marlowe's death, allowing him to escape almost certain trial and execution for his seditious atheism.

The date of Danby's death is unknown, but there is no record of his having presided over any other inquest after this date, so the last we hear of him is when he obeys the command to send a copy of the Marlowe inquisition to the Court of Chancery on 15 June 1593.
