= Michelle Butler Hallett =

Canadian novelist (born 1971)

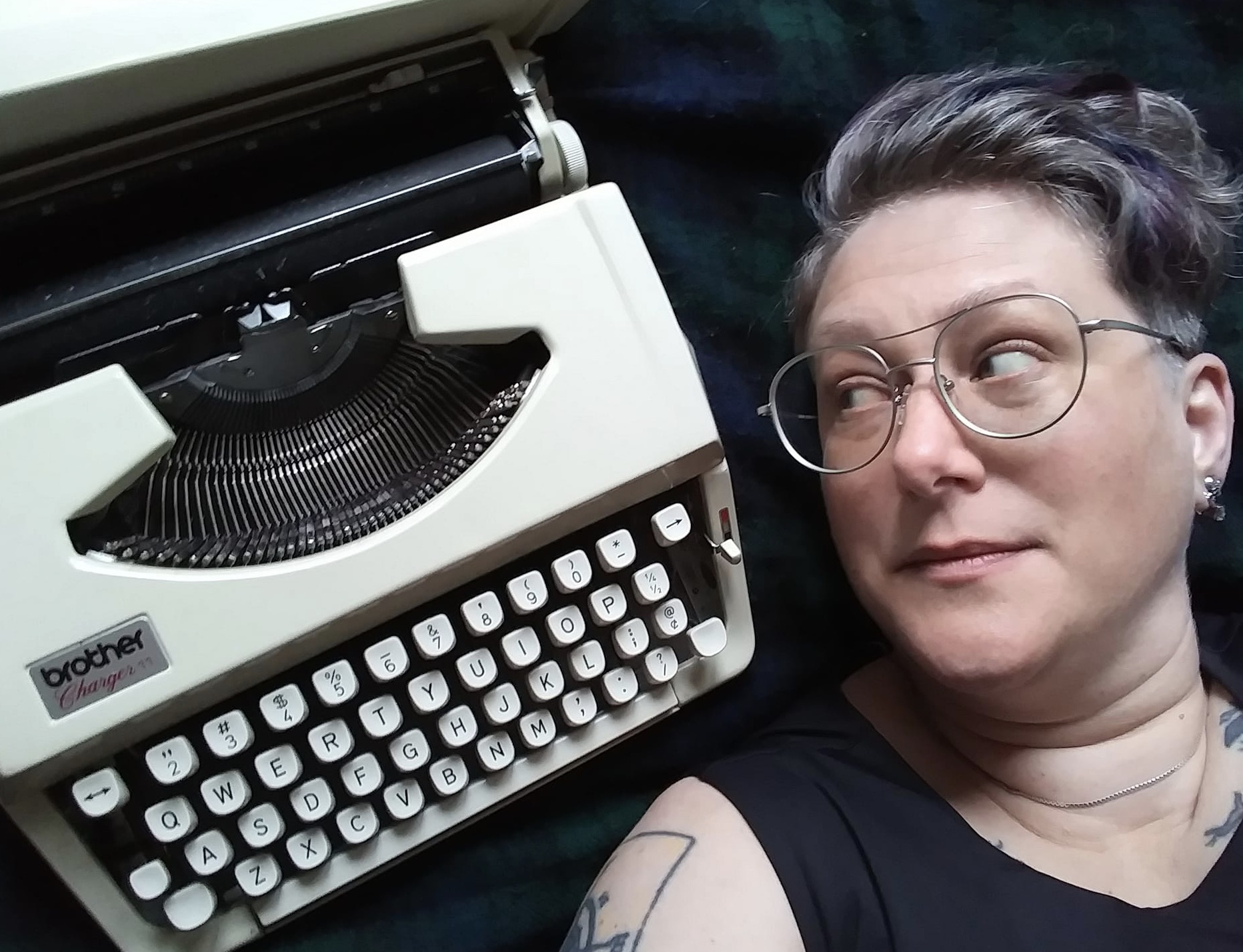
- Butler Hallett looking at one of her typewriters
- Born: 1971 (age 54–55)
- Occupation: Writer
- Writing career
- Genre: Historical fiction
- Website: michellebutlerhallett.ca

Michelle Butler Hallett (born 1971) is a Canadian writer from St. John's, Newfoundland and Labrador who writes predominantly historical fiction. Her novel Constant Nobody was the winner of the Thomas Head Raddall Award at the 2022 Atlantic Book Awards.

Her play Peter's Accent won the NL Arts & Letters, Dramatic Script in 2000. She published her debut short story collection The Shadow Side of Grace in 2006, and followed up in 2007 with her debut novel Double-blind.

Her novel This Marlowe, a 2016 novel which imagined the final months of Christopher Marlowe's life, was a longlisted nominee for the ReLit Award and the International Dublin Literary Award in 2017.

Butler Hallett lives with ankylosing spondylitis, and has also written essays about disability.

== Books ==
- The Shadow Side of Grace - 2006
- Double-blind - 2007
- Sky Waves - 2008
- Deluded Your Sailors - 2011
- This Marlowe - 2016
- Constant Nobody - 2021
