= The Marlowe Papers =

2012 novel by Ros Barber

- Author: Ros Barber
- Language: English
- Genre: Novel
- Publication date: 2012
- Publication place: England
- Awards: Hoffman Prize (2011); Desmond Elliott Prize (2013)

The Marlowe Papers is a novel by Ros Barber published in 2012.

The novel, written in blank verse, is a story about the English 16th century poet Christopher Marlowe, contemporary of William Shakespeare. In this tale, Marlowe's murder in 1593 is a fake and he lives on to write the plays and poems ascribed to Shakespeare.

The Desmond Elliott Prize judges called the book a "unique historical conspiracy story". According to Barber, she has encountered hostility because of the novel's Marlovian premise. She says, "It's a work of fiction. You can believe that Shakespeare of Stratford wrote the works and still enjoy it." Novelist Andrew Motion called it "either commendably ambitious or pointlessly elaborate." Kirkus Reviews said "Lush, inspired and provocative, this spellbinding dossier conjures up a bewitching Marlowe." Author Charles Nicholl said "Despite this shaky scaffolding of literary conspiracy, there is a great deal to enjoy in The Marlowe Papers. Barber conjures up some beautifully realized scenes." Author Adam O'Riordan called it an elegant addition to the Christopher Marlowe fiction genre. Author John Sutherland said "The Marlowe Papers grips. But it will pay to bone up on the relevant Wikipedia entries before embarking on the novel."

The Marlowe Papers won the Hoffman Prize in 2011, the Desmond Elliott Prize in 2013 and was joint-winner of the Authors' Club Best First Novel Award.

The book was adapted as a play by Barber and Nicola Haydn, performed by Jamie Martin in 2016.
