= Robin Auld (judge) =

Lord Justice of Appeal in the English Court of Appeal

The Right Honourable Sir Robin Auld FKC
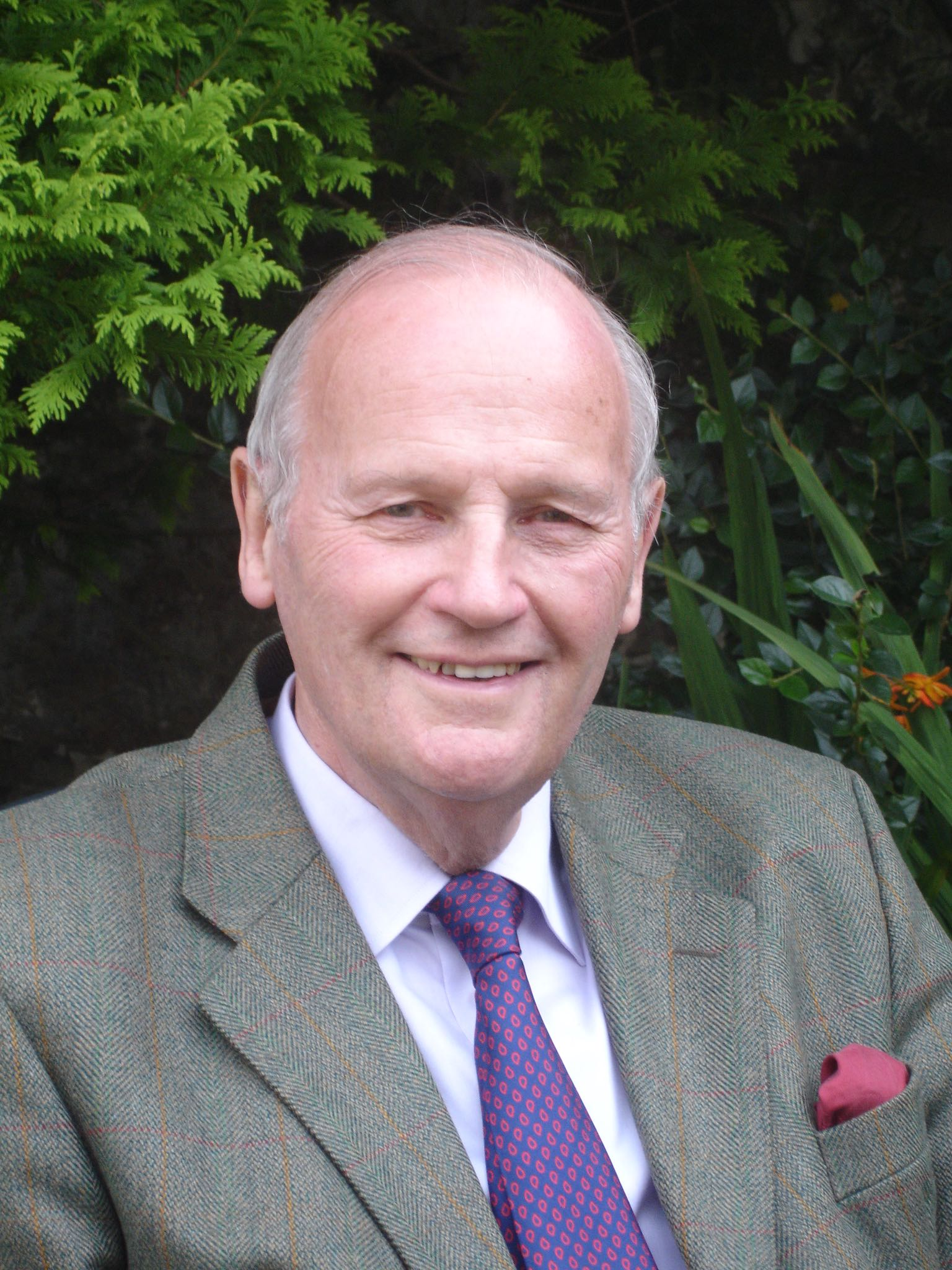
- Sir Robin Auld

Lord Justice of Appeal
- In office 1995–2007
- Succeeded by: Sir Colin Rimer

Justice of the High Court
- In office 1987–1995

Personal details
- Born: Robin Ernest Auld; 19 July 1937 (age 89) Staines, Middlesex, England
- Education: King's College London

Sir Robin Ernest Auld, FKC (born 19 July 1937) is a former Lord Justice of Appeal in the Court of Appeal of England and Wales.

== Early life and career ==
Born in Staines to Adelaide (née Mackie) and Ernest Auld, a toolmaker who later became a publican, Robin Auld failed the eleven-plus exam and went to Brooklands College, a technical college. Later he won a State Scholarship to study for a law degree at King's College London; he worked as a long distance lorry driver, baker's assistant and navvy on roadworks in the vacations, gaining an HGV lorry driver's licence and a qualification in bread baking. He graduated with first-class honours in Law in 1958. He had intended to be a country solicitor, but when faced with a premium of 400 guineas to train with a law firm decided for an academic career instead, and was awarded a PhD in Law from King's College in 1963. He won a scholarship to train for the bar, and was called to the bar in Gray's Inn in 1959, placed first in order of merit in the Bar Final Examinations, and awarded the Macaskie and Holker Scholarships.

He was also, during his practice at the Bar from 1963 to 1987, admitted to the Bars of Northern Ireland, New York State USA, Hong Kong and New South Wales, Australia. During that period he was appointed Queen's Counsel in 1975, a Recorder of the Crown Court in 1977, and elected a Bencher of Gray's Inn in 1984.

As a barrister he chaired or otherwise participated in a number of public inquiries in the UK and abroad, including: Member, Commission of Inquiry into Casino Gambling in the Bahamas, 1967; Chairman, William Tyndale Schools Inquiry, 1975–1976; Department of Trade Joint Inspector into the affairs of Ashbourne Investments Ltd., 1975–1979; Counsel to the Home Office Inquiry into the Brixton Disorders, 1981; Chairman, Home Office Committee into Late-Night and Sunday Trading, 1983–84; and Counsel for the UK, Australian Royal Commission of Inquiry into British Nuclear Tests in Australia (McClelland Royal Commission), 1984–1987.

He became a Fellow of King's College (FKC) in 1987 and was appointed Visiting Professor for three years from 2007. He has served on the College Council and in other roles, including President of King's College London Association, and as a Member of the King's College London Campaign Board and Patron of the college's Bar Society.

== Judicial career ==
In 1988, Auld was appointed a Justice of the High Court, Queen's Bench Division, and was knighted a month later. During his ensuing term of eight years in the post he was successively also a Member of the Judicial Studies Board and Chairman of its Criminal Committee, and Presiding Judge of the Western Circuit.

In 1995, Auld was appointed a Lord Justice of Appeal and made a Member of the Privy Council. During his ensuing period of 12 years in the Court of Appeal he was also: the Senior Presiding Judge for England & Wales, 1995–1998, and he conducted A Review of the Criminal Courts of England & Wales, 1999–2001; in the latter half of 2001 he was a Senior Resident Scholar at Yale Law School; he was also vice-chairman of the Criminal Procedure Rule Committee, 2004-2006 and vice-chairman of the Judicial Appointments Commission from 2006 to 2007. He retired from the Court of Appeal in 2007.

Following his retirement from the Court of Appeal, he has undertaken a variety of part-time judicial, academic and other work, including: Sole Commissioner of Inquiry into Governmental Corruption in the Turks & Caicos Islands from 2008 to 2009; Visiting Goodhart Professor in Legal Science at the University of Cambridge and Fellow of Selwyn and Wolfson Colleges, 2009–2010; a Justice of the Bermuda Court of Appeal, 2008–2015; President of the Solomon Islands Court of Appeal, 2009–2012; Member of the University of Oxford's Appeal Court, 2009–2015; Judicial Member, Tribunal of Inquiry into Misconduct of the Prime Minister of Papua New Guinea, 2010; and, since 2012, Slynn Foundation Trustee & Consultant on Constitutional/Judicial and Procedural Reforms in Eastern Europe, including their compliance with ECHR and EU norms – in particular in Ukraine and Macedonia.

== Personal life ==
Sir Robin is married to Catherine Alison Geissler, Professor Emerita of Human Nutrition at King's College London, past President of The Nutrition Society of the UK and Ireland, and Secretary-General of the International Union of Nutritional Sciences (2013–2017, 2017–2021). He was formerly married to Catherine Eleanor Mary Pritchard, by whom he has a son, Timothy, and a daughter, Rohan.

He is a member of the Athenaeum Club, London, the Yale Club (New York City), and of the Worshipful Company of Woolmen (Master 1984–85).
