= Eleanor Bull =

English proprietress

- Born: Eleanor Whitney c.1550
- Died: 1596 (aged 45–46)
- Spouse: Richard Bull (1571-1590, his death)

Eleanor Bull (c. 1550 – 1596) was an English businesswoman, known for owning the establishment in which Christopher Marlowe, the Elizabethan playwright and poet, was killed in 1593.

== Life ==
Eleanor (or Elinor) Whitney was daughter of James Whitney and Sybil, née Parry, of Clifford, Herefordshire; she was, according to Charles Nicholl, "a woman of substance, well-born and well-connected" rather than the "shabby old ale-house keeper" of some depictions. Eleanor was a niece of Blanche Parry, a companion of Queen Elizabeth I. Blanche gave Eleanor a legacy of £100 in her will in 1589.

The Whitney family, from a junior branch of which Eleanor's father came, were "an ancient border-country family" with a castle at Whitney-on-Wye in Herefordshire. They can be traced back to the thirteenth century, and "provided generations of county knights, MPs and sheriffs"; a generation prior, James Whitney (son of James Whitney of Whitney and Pen-cwm and Blanche Milborne, who raised Elizabeth I and Edward VI; Blanche's sister, Alice, was mother of Sybil and Blanche Parry) had been Server of the Chamber to Henry VIII.

Eleanor married Richard Bull October 14, 1571 at St Mary-le-Bow, London. He held the post of sub-bailiff at Sayes Court and worked for the Clerk of the Green Cloth. He died in 1590. After her husband's death, she stayed at their house on Deptford Strand, Deptford, which was in Kent, but is now within London. The house became a form of hotel or "rooming house in which meals were served". Her normal clientele included supervisors or inspectors at the dockyards, exporters of quality goods, and merchants involved in imports from Russia and the Baltic ports."

She died in Deptford and was buried on March 19, 1596.

== Death of Marlowe ==
Eleanor is known because it was at her house in which Christopher Marlowe was killed by stabbing during a quarrel with Ingram Frizer. Also present were Nicholas Skeres and Robert Poley. All had spent most of the day at Bull's house, apparently engaged in conversation, eating and drinking. At the inquest it was stated that the quarrel was over the bill (known as "the reckoning") for the day's events. Leslie Hotson, who first identified the documents relating to the inquest described Bull's house as a "tavern", leading to accounts of her as a kind of Mistress Quickly of Deptford "who is always ready to let a room for some disreputable purpose".

== Sources ==
- The Reckoning: The Murder of Christopher Marlowe by Charles Nicholl [Vintage; New Ed edition (3 Oct 2002)]
