= William Tyndale affair =

Controversy in British education in 1976

The William Tyndale affair was a controversy in British education arising from the introduction in 1974–75 of radically progressive methods at the William Tyndale Junior School in the London Borough of Islington. After parent protests and the publication in 1976 of a report commissioned by the Inner London Education Authority, the affair led to an increase in government authority over education in England and Wales and a reduction in the autonomy of the local education authorities.

== Events ==
In January 1974, Terry Ellis was appointed headmaster of the William Tyndale Junior School, located in Islington between the gentrified area of Canonbury Square and several large council estates. He and deputy head Brian Haddow instituted a radical child-centred system, the 'integrated day', under which the school day was divided into alternating 'open' and 'closed' one-hour periods, with pupils free to choose what they did in the open periods. They had great freedom and access to all parts of the school, "even the staff common room and lavatories". Ellis responded to parents' concerns that children were being allowed to roam the streets: "What do you expect me to do? Make the school into a concentration camp to keep your children in?" Ellis and his colleagues went beyond traditional progressive education of the period as recommended in the Plowden Report, which they saw as chiefly benefitting better-off children whose parents could help them with their work; rather, in Ellis's words, Tyndale "geared its main educational effort towards the disadvantaged." Frank Musgrove, a professor of education, has described the Tyndale experiment as "implement[ing] a fair selection of sociologically inspired clichés in the repertoire of advanced diploma courses for serving teachers." A cloakroom was converted into a 'sanctuary' for disturbed children with a special teacher, and to provide all the children with an outlet for their own skills, a steel band was organised which practised as much as eight hours a week. Severe disciplinary problems arose that the staff were unable to solve, including gambling away of lunch money, fire-starting and throwing full milk bottles into the infants' playground from the roof of the toilets.

Annie Walker, a part-time remedial reading teacher, led a protest by the minority of staff who objected to the changes, and issued a circular to parents; many parents, particularly of academically able children, withdrew their children or refused to allow them to continue from the infant school in the same building, so that the number enrolled fell sharply, eventually to 55 from 230 in 1973. The teachers had refused to allow the formation of a parent-teacher association because they thought it would be dominated by middle-class parents; since there was none, the parental complaints and staff disagreement caused the school managers to become involved on the side of the protesting staff, including seeking to inspect the school and witness classes. The dispute was widely covered in the press and there was general agreement that the children were receiving a poor education. The Inner London Education Authority responded to the managers' appeal in autumn 1975 by sending a team of inspectors to the school, who were at first forced to teach children themselves since the radical teachers had set up a rival 'strike school' elsewhere. The ILEA endorsed pupil-centred teaching and many 'experimental' schools at the time were in London, and under Ellis's predecessor Alan Head, Tyndale had been noted for team teaching, but the authority allowed heads considerable autonomy and had increasingly replaced inspection of primary schools with support for teachers and self-evaluation; the affair revealed a general reluctance of local education authorities to set policy and problems dealing with inadequate teachers. It also widened the conflict between the ILEA and the Inner London boroughs, which had no control over education but did appoint the boards of secondary schools and the managers of primary schools.

== Investigation and aftermath ==
A parliamentary inquiry was conducted from October 1975 to February 1976 by Robin Auld, QC. The Auld Report, published in 1976, did not attempt to formally assess children's mastery of skills such as reading, but was critical of all concerned. Ellis, Haddow and five other teachers were dismissed based on it, but the local authority itself was found to have not fulfilled its legal responsibilities. A book by two Times Educational Supplement journalists, Mark Jackson and John Gretton, advocated government intervention to define and enforce educational standards: "After William Tyndale, the Secretary of State can no longer pretend, as he and his predecessors have so often tended to do, that it is all happening somewhere else." The affair catalysed public loss of confidence in the management of the education system and led to 'The Great Debate' on state education after Prime Minister James Callaghan's speech at Ruskin College in October 1976, in which he referred to "the new informal methods of teaching, which seem to produce excellent results when they are in well-qualified hands but are much more dubious when they are not", and eventually to state standards and policies which greatly reduced the freedom of the local education authorities and the autonomy of teachers in individual schools. It also probably contributed to the eventual dissolution of the ILEA.

== Further information ==
- "William Tyndale, School or Scandal", Public Affairs, BBC Radio 4, 1990.
- Terry Ellis et al. William Tyndale: The Teachers' Story. London: Writers and Readers Publishing Co-operative, 1977. ISBN 9780904613315.
