= Ros Barber =

English novelist and poet, born 1964

- Born: 1964 (age 61–62)
- Occupations: Novelist, poet, academic
- Writing career
- Notable work: The Marlowe Papers
- Notable awards: Desmond Elliott Prize, Authors' Club Best First Novel Award, Hoffman Prize
- Website: rosbarber.com

Rosalind Barber (born 1964) is an English novelist, poet and academic. Her work include Material, a collection of poetry, and the novel The Marlowe Papers.

== Education ==
She has a BSc in Biology, an MA in creative writing, the arts and education, and a PhD in English literature, all from the University of Sussex. Her PhD was completed in 2011 with a dissertation titled Writing Marlowe as writing Shakespeare. She also has an Open University BA in English literature and philosophy.

Barber has worked as a computer programmer.

== Novels ==
Barber's first novel, The Marlowe Papers (2012), is written in blank verse and was part of a PhD. She subscribes to the Marlovian theory of Shakespeare authorship, and is as of 2023 a director of research of the Shakespearean Authorship Trust. In 2013, she described herself as an "agnostic" on Marlowe as Shakespeare. In the book, Marlowe's death is a ruse and he writes plays in Shakespeare's name. The book won the Hoffman Prize, the Desmond Elliott Prize and the Authors' Club First Novel Award. Her second novel, Devotion (2015), was shortlisted for the Encore Award.

Together with Nicola Haydn, she wrote a one-man stage adaptation of The Marlowe Papers performed in 2016.

== Poetry ==
Of Barber's three volumes of poetry, Material (2008) was a Poetry Book Society recommendation. Its title poem, which also appears in the Faber anthology Poems of the Decade (2015), was in England's school sixth-form syllabus as of 2017.

== Academic position ==
As of 2021, Barber lectures in the Department of English and Comparative Literature at Goldsmiths, University of London. Her appointment ended in 2024.

== Awards and recognition ==
She won the Hoffman Prize in 2011, 2014 and 2018.

Year	Work	Award	Result	Ref
2011	The Marlowe Papers	Hoffman Prize	Won	
2013	The Marlowe Papers	Authors' Club First Novel Award	Won	
2013	The Marlowe Papers	Desmond Elliott Prize	Won	
2013	The Marlowe Papers	Women's Prize for Fiction	Longlisted	
2014	"Shortly he will forget to go"	Hoffman Prize	Won	
2015	Devotion	Encore Award	Shortlisted	
2018	"Big Data, Little Certainty"	Hoffman Prize	Won	

== Bibliography ==
=== Novels ===
- The Marlowe Papers (2012)
- Devotion (2015)

=== Poetry ===
- How Things Are on Thursday (2004)
- Not the Usual Grasses Singing (2005)
- Material (2008)

=== Non-fiction ===
- 30 Second Shakespeare (2015)

== Personal life ==
Barber's parents, who were physicists, divorced when she was young. A brother of hers died of cancer.

Barber's first marriage ended in her mid-thirties. She later remarried.
