= William Elderton (ballad writer) =

Actor, lawyer, and ballad-writer

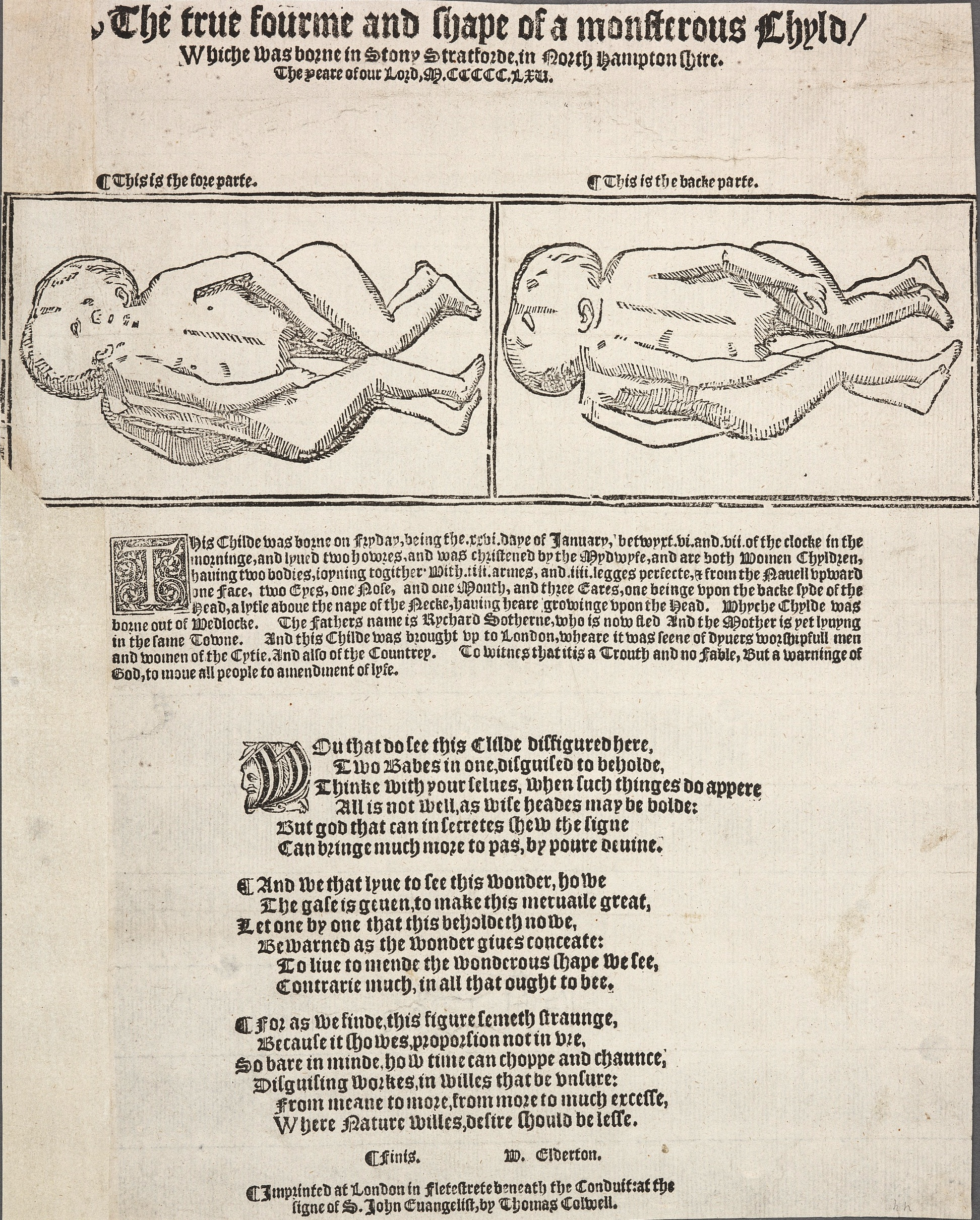
The true fourme and shape of a monsterous Chyld / Which was borne in Stony Stratforde, in North Hampton shire (1565). Ballad sheet written by William Elderton. Huntington Library.

William Elderton (died 1592?) was an actor, lawyer, and prolific English ballad-writer, well known in London literary circles.

== Life ==
Elderton first appears as an actor playing the fourth son of the Lord of Misrule, played by George Ferrers, at the court of Edward VI during the 1552-1553 Christmas season.

His son, also named William, was christened on 16 January 1548 as recorded in the parish register of St. Peter's upon Cornhill, London. His wife, Grace Clearton, was buried on 9 November 1553, in the same church, and his servant, Steven Riche, on 8 December of the same year.

== Works ==
An early dated ballad of Elderton is The Panges of Loue and louers fttes (sic), 1559. Michael Drayton, in his epistle to Henry Reynolds, writes —

I scornd your ballet then, though it were done
And had for Finis William Elderton.

A lost book, entitled Eldertons Jestes with his mery Toyes, was licensed for publication in 1561-2 (Arber, Transcript, i. 179). It provoked 'An Admonition to Elderton to leave the toyes by him begone,' which was followed by 'Eldertons answere for his mery toyes.' Both the 'Admonition' and the 'Answer' are also lost. Among Elderton's extant ballads are

- 'The true fourme and shape of a monstrous chyld which was borne at Stony Stratforde... 1565';
- 'An Epytaphe upon the Death of the Right Reverent and learned Father in God, I. Iuell,' 1571;
- 'A ballat intituled Northomberland Newes,' &c., n. d. (licensed 1569);
- 'A new Yorkshyre song,' &c., 1584, describing a match at archery, in twenty-two six-line stanzas.

Some verses of Elderton are printed before Claudius Hollyband's Arnalt and Lucenda, 1575. John Stow in his 'Survey,' (chapter on 'Cheape Warde'), quotes some verses on the images over the Guildhall Gate, composed 'about thirty yeares since by William Elderton, at that time an Atturney in the Sheriifes Courtes there.' From A true reporte of the death and martyrdome of M. Campion, 1581, it appears that he published some 'scurile balates' on Edmund Campion's execution.

Elderton died in or before 1592. In that year Gabriel Harvey published his Foure Letters, in which he describes Elderton and Robert Greene as 'two notorious mates and the very ringleaders of the riming and scribbling crew'. He speaks in the same tract of 'Elderton's ale-crammed nose.' Thomas Nashe, in Foure Letters Confuted, 1593, upbraids Harvey for 'plucking Elderton out of the ashes of his ale,' and says that there had been a 'monstrous emulation' between Elderton and Harvey. There are two jocular epitaphs on Elderton in William Camden's Remaines, 1605, p. 56. Some of his ballads were reprinted by John Payne Collier for the Percy Society (Old Ballads from Early Printed Copies) in 1840; others are included in Ancient Ballads and Broadsides (Philobiblon Society), 1867. The opening lines of a ballad by Elderton are quoted in Much Ado about Nothing, v. 2. John Ward, in Journal of the American Musicological Society, 1957, X, p. 164 gives more detail of this song "The God of Love", as sung by Benedick in Much Ado about Nothing.
