= Nicola Haydn =

British actress, director and playwright

Nicola Haydn is an actress, director and playwright from Brighton. She trained at Rose Bruford College of Speech and Drama.

== Career ==
Her one-woman plays include 'Up the Duff', about a young girl grappling with possible pregnancy, and biographical play 'Janis' about the life of Janis Joplin.

For her performance in 'Janis', she won 'Best Performer' in the 2009 Brighton Festival Fringe, and was nominated for 'Best Solo Performance' in 2009 The Stage Awards for Acting Excellence.

Directing Credits include: 'Hamlet' (2007 Brighton Fringe - winner Argus Angel), 'The Importance of Being Earnest' at The Grand Hotel (2010 Brighton Fringe - winner Argus Angel), 'The Open Couple' (2011 Brighton Fringe), 'Arnold Wesker's The Mistress' (Brighton Fringe 2012), 'The Marlowe Papers' (Otherplace at The Basement, The Warren at Brighton Fringe 2016 and Brighton Open Air Theatre 2016), 'The Cheeseboard Predicament' by Tom Akehurst for Halcyon Productions (2018 Brighton Open Air Theatre).

Nicola ran the Brighton fringe theatre and comedy venue Upstairs at Three and Ten up from 2008 - 2014. Upstairs at Three and Ten twice won best venue in Brighton Fringe Awards, as well as 'best comedy venue in the south' at the Chortle Awards. She previously ran theatre venue 'The Marlborough' (2005 - 2007).

In 2012 the company created The Warren - a pop-up venue for Brighton Fringe which was awarded Best Venue at the Fringe Awards.

In 2019 The Warren was home to 250 visiting companies, and was the largest venue hub at Brighton Fringe boasting 6 theatres, 2 bars and a children's area.

Due to the COVID-19 pandemic The Brighton Fringe did not take place in May 2020, but Haydn and her team produced an outdoor summer season situated on Brighton Beach, for which they won a 'Legends of Lockdown Award' from Chortle.
