= Robert Poley =

English spy of the 16th century

Robert Poley, or Pooley (fl. 1568– aft. 1602) was an English double agent, government messenger and agent provocateur employed by members of the Privy Council during the reign of Queen Elizabeth I; he was described as "the very genius of the Elizabethan underworld". Poley is particularly noted for his central role in uncovering the so-called Babington Plot to assassinate the Queen in 1586, and for being a witness of, and even a possible party to, the reported killing in self-defence by Ingram Frizer of the famous poet/dramatist Christopher Marlowe in May 1593.

== Early life ==
There is no known record of Poley's birth and early education, the first information being his matriculation as a lowly sizar at Cambridge University's Clare College in the Michaelmas trimester of 1568. Although there was a fairly wide range, the typical age at matriculation was about 17 which would suggest that he was born in the early 1550s. Poley did not go on to take a degree, which could indicate that he was in fact a Catholic, as was certainly the cover he adopted later.

After his spell at university, nothing is known of his whereabouts or occupation until the early 1580s, apparently with large sums of money at his disposal.

In 1582, he married someone referred to as "Watson's daughter", by whom he had a daughter, Anne, who was baptised on 21 April 1583. At around that time, he started a campaign to work for Sir Francis Walsingham as a Catholic informer, the only result of which seems to have been his imprisonment in the Marshalsea on Walsingham's orders until May the next year. During this imprisonment, he refused to see his wife, but regularly entertained a married woman called Joan Yeomans to "many fine banquets" there.

== Early career ==
Following his release he continued his attempts to find employment in the government's service, both with Sir Francis Walsingham (via Walsingham's young relative Thomas Walsingham) and with the Earl of Leicester. The latter approach seems to have met with some success, since in June 1585 he was working with Christopher Blount (possibly a relative of Poley's?) under Leicester's aegis. He was sent as a 'special messenger' – in other words a Catholic sympathiser – to Paris to contact Thomas Morgan, one of the main conspirators working on behalf of Mary, Queen of Scots, and to deliver a letter from Blount. He returned around 10 July.

In late 1585 Poley was placed, apparently by Blount, with Sir Philip Sidney who had recently married Sir Francis Walsingham's daughter Frances and, as a part of the marriage settlement, was living in Sir Francis's house in Seething Lane. This meant that Poley (whether it was planned or not) could claim to have regular access to Sir Francis without there being any suspicion that he was actually working for him. On 18 January 1586 Morgan wrote that Poley "is placed with the Lady Sidney, the daughter of Secretary Walsingham, & by that means ordinarily in his house".

When Sir Philip left England to fight in the Netherlands in November 1585, Poley remained behind with Frances, and remained there until Sir Philip's death in October 1586, nearly a year later. In January 1586 he was actually asked to organise the delivery of a packet of letters to Mary, Queen of Scots. Apparently fully trusted by the Catholics, Poley nevertheless delivered the details to Walsingham. In March/April that year he was also able to reveal thoughts of plot to kill Leicester to the Earl himself, and wrote back on Leicester's behalf to discover the details.

== The Babington Plot ==
In June 1586 Poley's cover as a Catholic sympathiser in Sir Francis's household was still working as he was asked to help obtain passports from Walsingham for Sir Anthony Babington and his fellow-conspirator Thomas Salisbury. From then on Poley became Babington's "servant and companion" and was often seen in his company despite doubts about Poley's trustworthiness being expressed by some Catholics. In the first two weeks of August, the conspiracy came to its fateful conclusion. On 2 June the conspirators had met and dined "in Poley's garden", the house having actually been requisitioned by the government from a Queen's Messenger, Anthony Hall. Babington found Poley copying some of his papers, but Poley was able to talk his way out of it. On the following day, Poley briefed Sir Francis and on 4 June passed messages from him back to Thomas Walsingham, who seems to have been the case officer. Although the conspirators fled they were all caught. In his cover as one of them Poley was committed to the Tower on 18 August, "charged to have dealt treacherously", but the Catholics weren't fooled. Anthony Babington, who was executed on 20 September, feared that it was Poley who had betrayed him, but he could never bring himself fully to accept it. After his arrest Babington sent Poley a letter saying "Farewell sweet Robyn, if as I take thee, true to me. If not adieu, omnius bipedum nequissimus [of all two-footed creatures the vilest]." Babington also asked him to return a diamond ring.

Poley spent the next two years imprisoned in the Tower of London, during which time Sir Philip Sidney died from wounds he had received at Zutphen in the Netherlands, and Mary Queen of Scots was tried and executed. He was released late in 1588, having nevertheless kept in touch with both Blount and Walsingham during his incarceration.

== Messenger of the Court ==
His cover as a Catholic agent now blown, Poley moved into a more administrative role in Walsingham's service, apparently acting as more of a case officer and messenger. He was credited with creating complex ciphers in order to deliver his messages without fear of interception. Records of payments to him between December 1588 and September 1601 show travel with important and secret documents to and from Denmark, the Netherlands, France and Scotland for members of the Privy Council. Sir Francis died in 1590, but payments continued to be made to Poley mainly by the Vice-Chamberlain, Sir Thomas Heneage or the Lord Treasurer, Lord Burghley, until Heneage's death in October 1595, and after that mainly by Burghley's son Sir Robert Cecil.

== The killing of Christopher Marlowe ==
It was in the course of one of these trips that the killing of Christopher Marlowe occurred in the house of a widow, Eleanor Bull, in Deptford. Poley had left England on 8 May 1593 with messages for The Hague. The warrant for his payment, dated 12 June, tells us that he had delivered the reply to the court at Nonsuch Palace on 8 June and that he had been "in her Majesty's service all the aforesaid time." In 1925, however, Leslie Hotson discovered details of the inquest on the death of Christopher Marlowe, the famous poet/dramatist, at which Poley was one of the three witnesses. The report itself tells us that Ingram Frizer killed Marlowe in self-defence, by stabbing him over the right eye in a scuffle started by Marlowe in a dispute over payment of the bill (the "reckoning") for the room and board provided for them. Poley and another man, former government agent Nicholas Skeres, were sitting on either side of Frizer when Marlowe allegedly attacked him from behind.

Although some biographers still accept the story told at the inquest as a true account, the majority nowadays find it hard to believe, and suggest that it was a deliberate murder, even though there is little agreement as to just who was behind it or their motive for such a course of action. The Marlovian theory even argues that the most logical reason for those people to have been there at that time was to fake Marlowe's death, allowing him to escape almost certain trial and execution for his seditious atheism. Why, after the inquest, there was a week's delay before Poley delivered to the Privy Council the replies to the letters concerning "special and secret affairs of great importance" he had carried, is one of the several mysteries concerning this event.

== Later career ==
For the next eight years Poley was fairly regularly employed by the Privy Council either as a messenger, agent provocateur or spy. It was presumably in one of the latter two categories that in September 1593 he was arrested and imprisoned in the Netherlands accused of activities "amounting to treason", but after a couple of weeks he was released without charge.

There was another probably much longer period of imprisonment for him in the Summer of 1597, when it seems that he was placed in the Marshalsea to spy on the playwright Ben Jonson whose play, The Isle of Dogs, written with Thomas Nashe had upset the authorities. Jonson attacked Poley and a second informer, named Parrot, as "damned villains" and later wrote a poem praising convivial company without spies, including the line "we shall have no Poley or Parrot by".

The last payment known to have been received by Poley was 5 September 1601, when he was paid £10, by Sir Robert Cecil, for carrying post from and to Paris. This is the last heard of him except for a letter he wrote to Cecil on 18 July the following year. He sends information concerning Jesuits and their means of entering the country, but also indicates that his relationship with Cecil is now rather strained, saying, "How, half offended, you said to me I never made you good intelligence, nor did you service worth reckoning, is the cause I have not since presented myself with offer of my duty, although I much desire my endeavours might please you, my necessities needing your favour." The place and date of his death is unknown.
