= A Dictionarie French and English =

16th century dictionary by Claudius Hollyband

A Dictionarie French and English: published for the benefite of the studious in that language is a bilingual French to English dictionary compiled by the Huguenot refugee Claudius Hollyband while residing in London in the late 16th century.

Along with Robert Estienne's Dictionnaire françois-latin, Hollyband's Dictionarie French and English is a source for Randle Cotgrave's Dictionarie of the French and English Tongues. which is often taken as the first French-English dictionary. A 1608 privilege presents Cotgrave's Dictionarie as collected first by C. Holyband and augmented or altered by R. Cotgrave.

== Sources ==
- Lucy E. Farrer, Un devancier de Cotgrave : la vie et les œuvres de Claude de Sainliens alias Claudius Holyband, Paris, H. Champion, 1908. Reprint: Geneva, Slatkine Reprints, 1971
- Vera Ethel Smalley, The Sources of A dictionarie of the French and English tongues by Randle Cotgrave (London, 1611): A study in Renaissance lexicography, Baltimore, Johns Hopkins Press, 1948, (p. 71–88)
