= Claudius Hollyband =

Claudius Hollyband (born Claude de Sainliens; Latin: Claudius a Sancto Vinculo) was a 16th-century French-English linguist, philologist, phonologist, lexicographer and instructor of English, French, Italian and Latin. He was the author of many books and treatises regarding language, including one of the earliest French-English dictionaries, A Dictionarie French and English, published in London in 1593.

A Huguenot refugee from Moulins where he was born in 1534, France, Hollyband arrived in London, England in about 1564 and died in this city in 1594.

== Works ==
- The French school-master, London, A. Veale, 1573. Reprint: Menston, Scolar Press, 1972
- De Pronuntiatione linguae gallicae (1580) : suivi de The French Littleton (1566). Reprint: Geneva, Slatkine Reprints, 1973
- Claudii a Sancto Vinculo De pronuntiatione linguae gallicae libri duo, London, Scolar Press, 1974
- Campo di Fior, or the Flowery Field of Four Languages (1583)
- A Dictionarie French and English: published for the benefite of the studious in that language, London, Thomas Woodcock, 1593. Reprint: London, Scolar Press, 1974
- The French schoolemaister. Wherein is most plainly shewed the true and perfect way of pronouncinge the French tongue to the furtherance of those who desire to learn it, London, Clement Knight, 1612. Reprint: London, Scolar Press, 1974
- The Elizabethan home, Folcroft, Folcroft Library, 1974
- The French Littelton: A most easie, perfect, and absolute way to learne the Frenche tongue, London, Scolar Press, 1974
- Claude Desainliens, de pronuntiatione lingua Gallicae, 1580, Menston, Scolar Press, 1970
- The Pretie and Wittie Historie of Arnalt & Lucenda: translated from B. Maraffi's Italian version of the Greek original, together with the Italian version with certen Rules and Dialogues set foorth for the learner of th' Italian tong... by C. Hollyband, London, Thomas Purfoote, 1575
- A Treatise for declining of verbes, which may be called the second chiefest worke of the French tongue, London, G. Miller, 1633

== Bibliography ==
- Laurent Berec, Claude de Sainliens, un huguenot bourbonnais au temps de Shakespeare, Éditions Orizons, 2012 (ISBN 978-2-296-08837-5)
- (in Italian) Antonio Amato, Teoria e pratica glottodidattica nell'opera di Claudius Holyband (alias Claude de Sainliens), Roma, Bulzoni, 1983
- Jean-Marie Gaul, Commentaire du French Littelton (1576) de Claude de Sainliens, Montréal, Université de Montréal, 1960
- Peter Rickard, La Langue française au seizième siècle. Étude suivie de textes, Cambridge, Cambridge University Press, 1968
- R. C. Simonini, Jr., Italian Scholarship in Renaissance England. Chapel Hill, University of North Carolina Press, 1952

== Sources ==
- Lucy E. Farrer, Un devancier de Cotgrave : la vie et les œuvres de Claude de Sainliens alias Claudius Holyband, Paris, H. Champion, 1908; réimp. Genève, Slatkine Reprints, 1971
- Vera Ethel Smalley, The Sources of A dictionarie of the French and English tongues by Randle Cotgrave (London, 1611); a study in Renaissance lexicography, Baltimore, Johns Hopkins Press, 1948, (p. 71–88)
- Laurent Berec, Claude de Sainliens, un huguenot bourbonnais au temps de Shakespeare, Éditions Orizons, Paris, 2012
