= Ingram Frizer =

English gentleman and businessman

- Born: Likely Kingsclere, Hampshire
- Died: August 14, 1627 (burial); Eltham, Kent, England
- Resting place: Eltham Parish Church
- Occupations: Business agent; property speculator
- Employer: Thomas Walsingham
- Known for: The killing of playwright Christopher Marlowe
- Status: Pardoned by Queen Elizabeth I
- Criminal charges: Homicide (found to be self-defense)
- Accomplices: Nicholas Skeres; Robert Poley

Details
- Victims: Christopher Marlowe
- Date: 30 May 1593
- Locations: Deptford, England
- Weapon: Dagger

Ingram Frizer (/ˈɪŋɡrəm ˈfraɪzər/ ING-grəm FRY-zər; died August 1627) was an English gentleman and businessman of the late 16th and early 17th centuries who is notable for his reported killing of the playwright Christopher Marlowe in the home of Eleanor Bull on 30 May 1593. He may have been working with the English secret service. He has been described as "a property speculator, a commodity broker, a fixer for gentlemen of good worship" and a confidence trickster gulling "young fools" out of their money.

== Biography ==
There is no definite information regarding Frizer's origins, but he may have been born in or near Kingsclere in Hampshire. The Tragicall History of Christopher Marlowe (1942) by John Bakeless refers to the work of Eugénie de Kalb, "whose researches have provided most of our knowledge of [Frizer's] career", as the origin of the conjecture that Frizer came from Kingsclere, "where there were many Frisers (sic) and where the Christian name Ingram was frequent, though there is no trace of an Ingram Friser".

Surviving legal records show Frizer to have been fairly successful in profiting from buying and selling property. At the time of Marlowe's death, Frizer was a servant to the landowner Thomas Walsingham; Frizer appears to have been Walsingham's business agent. Walsingham was a young relative of Queen Elizabeth's secretary of state Sir Francis Walsingham; both Walsinghams had been involved heavily with intelligence work a few years earlier, but there is no evidence that Frizer had any connection with it.

An example of Frizer's dishonest business dealings was that in 1593, collaborating with Nicholas Skeres (who was also present at Marlowe's killing), he was involved in lending money to one Drew Woodleff, who had signed a bond for £60 in exchange for some guns that Frizer supposedly had in storage. Frizer then claimed to have sold them on Woodleff's behalf, but for only £30. The effect of this was that Frizer, who never offered any guns for sale, had made Woodleff a loan of £30, to be repaid by the redemption of the £60 bond, an interest rate of 100%. Woodleff later signed a bond for £200 in favour of Thomas Walsingham, agreeing the forfeit of land to him in default of payment, to extricate himself from his bond to Frizer.

A few years later, when King James ascended the throne, and Frizer received numerous benefits from the crown through the action of Audrey Walsingham (Thomas's wife and a friend of James's wife Anne of Denmark). He moved to Eltham, about three miles from the by then Sir Thomas Walsingham's estate at Scadbury. Having been given permission by the parish's vicar to dig a well at a corner of the vicar's close, for which privilege Frizer "typically failed" to pay, he used the water to brew ale. He became a churchwarden in 1605 and a parish tax assessor in 1611. There was a daughter named Alice Dixon, who lived in London, and another who married a man called John Banks. A Mrs. Ingeram who was buried at Eltham on 25 August 1616 may perhaps have been his wife, and he remained there apparently in genteel respectability until his death, being buried in the church on 14 August 1627.

== Christopher Marlowe ==
For several years before his death, Christopher Marlowe had been employed in some intelligence capacity on behalf of the government. In the spring of 1593 he appears to have been staying at Thomas Walsingham's home at Scadbury, near Chislehurst in Kent, and had been invited by Frizer to a "feast" in Deptford, a township on the river Thames some seven miles to the north, at the house of Eleanor Bull, the widow of a local official. The status of Bull's establishment is unclear, but it was probably a private victualling house, rather than a public tavern. Also in attendance were Nicholas Skeres and Robert Poley, both of whom had been associated with Sir Francis Walsingham's intelligence operation. In fact, Poley was working for the Privy Council at the time.

Complete details of Marlowe's killing on 30 May 1593, as contained in an inquest run by the Coroner of the Queen's Household two days later, were discovered by Leslie Hotson in 1925. According to this report, based upon accounts from the three men present, Poley, Frizer, Skeres and Marlowe were in a private room, having had dinner. Poley, Frizer and Skeres were all seated facing a table with Frizer in the middle. Marlowe was lounging on a bed just behind them when Frizer and he got into an argument over "le recknynge" (the reckoning, i.e. the bill). Marlowe suddenly jumped up, seized Frizer's dagger, which Frizer was wearing "at his back", and with it struck him twice on the head, leaving wounds two inches long and a quarter deep. Frizer, his freedom of movement restricted between Poley and Skeres, struggled to defend himself and in doing so stabbed Marlowe above the right eye, killing him immediately.

Frizer was found by the inquest jury on 1 June 1593 to be not guilty of murder for reasons of self-defence, and on 28 June, the queen granted him a formal pardon.

=== Motives ===
Although some contend the "self-defence" evidence offered at Marlowe's inquest was quite in keeping with the victim's alleged propensity for sudden violence, this has been brought into question by Charles Nicholl, who notes that Marlowe's supposed previous history of violence has been somewhat exaggerated. The tendency, particularly by Park Honan, to portray Marlowe as violent is challenged by Rosalind Barber in her essay "Was Marlowe a Violent Man?".

It has been suggested that Frizer could have had other motives. Honan proposes that Marlowe's presence at Scadbury was a threat to Walsingham's reputation and influence, and thus threatened Frizer's interests. The Privy Council certainly suspected Marlowe of atheism and heresy, yet he was a regular and welcome house-guest of one of Elizabeth's former spymasters. At the start of 1593, it was upheld in Parliament that heresy was tantamount to the greatest crime of all: treason. Honan considers it possible that, given the circumstances, it was Thomas Walsingham, accustomed "not to look far into Frizer's...trickery", who initiated the deed by making his agent aware that Marlowe was becoming a liability to them both, and so indirectly securing his former friend's death.

Another theory suggests that Marlowe, as a supposed member of The School of Night, became aware of Essex's plots against Raleigh, and Skeres was sent to warn him to keep silent. It was only when Marlowe refused to heed the warning was the unpremeditated decision taken to silence him in a more certain and final way. In this theory, Frizer is no more than one of Skeres's associates, and not the principal player.

The Marlovian theory suggests that Frizer took part in the faking of Marlowe's death to allow him to escape trial and almost certain execution for his subversively atheistic activities. This theory further suggests that Marlowe went into exile, and wrote the plays attributed to William Shakespeare.
