= Thomas Walsingham (literary patron) =

British courtier (1561–1630)

Sir Thomas Walsingham
- Monarch: Elizabeth I

Personal details
- Born: c. 1561 England (disputed)
- Died: 11 August 1630 (aged 69) Scadbury, Kent
- Resting place: St Nicholas's Church, Chislehurst, Kent
- Spouse: Audrey Walsingham

Sir Thomas Walsingham (c. 1561 – 11 August 1630) was a courtier to Queen Elizabeth I and literary patron to such poets as Thomas Watson, Thomas Nashe, George Chapman and Christopher Marlowe. He was related to Elizabeth's spymaster Francis Walsingham and the employer of Marlowe's murderer Ingram Frizer. This connection is one of the reasons offered for suggesting that Marlowe's death may have been linked with intelligence work, and not a dispute over a bill for food and accommodation, as in the coroner's verdict.

== Early life ==
Walsingham was the third son of Sir Thomas Walsingham (1526–1584), an important landowner in Kent, and grandson to Sir Edmund Walsingham, courtier to Henry VIII and later Lieutenant of the Tower of London. He was first cousin once removed to Sir Francis Walsingham, Ambassador to France and head of secret intelligence. In November 1589, on the death of his older brother, Edmund, Thomas Walsingham inherited the manor of Scadbury, Kent; the first-born brother, Guldeford, had predeceased their father and the estate had passed in turn to the second son, Edmund, before descending to Thomas. The inheritance came as Thomas's debts were mounting but it was not in time to prevent a short spell in the Fleet debtors' prison early in 1590, before he was able to take up residence at Scadbury. By 1593 he was settled in Scadbury and employing Ingram Frizer as his business agent, advancing money to needy heirs against the security of their inheritance. Frizer may have had a further role: he may have acted as a messenger between Walsingham and his former contacts in the intelligence world, entrusted with keeping them at arm's length from his employer's new life as landed gentleman and courtier. One of these agents was Robert Poley. Marlowe was killed in 1593 by Frizer, with Poley present, purportedly in a dispute over an unpaid debt. Poley later became an important, secret intermediary in clandestine arrangements for installing Elizabeth's putative successor, King James.

== Royal service ==
Francis Walsingham made use of his young relative as early as October 1580, when he appointed him as one of the trusted couriers between the English court and the queen's ambassador in France. In August 1581 Thomas accompanied Sir Francis to Paris on a delicate diplomatic mission connected with the proposed marriage between Elizabeth and the French king's brother, Francis, Duke of Anjou. In 1596 he was appointed Justice of the Peace for the Kent hundred of Rokesley and he organised the local defences against the Armada. He was knighted soon afterwards, on a royal progress to Scadbury, a visit probably resulting from family connections at Court of Audrey, his wife. Audrey became a favourite of the queen and the couple were thereafter regular attenders at Court. In the 1597, 1601 and 1604 he was elected Member of Parliament for Rochester. In 1614 he was returned to Parliament as knight of the shire for Kent.

== Literary patronage ==
The first poet to seek Walsingham's patronage was Thomas Watson, an old acquaintance from the time when both men had been engaged on Sir Francis's secret business in France. His timely dedication to Thomas Walsingham, newly come into money through his inheritance, prefaced A Lament for Meliboeus, an elegy on the death of Sir Francis. Watson's venture was based on the family relationship between the dedicatee and the dead statesman, but Thomas Walsingham proved to be a genuine patron of literary endeavour and other poets followed the example. It is probable that Watson introduced Marlowe, a friend from the London literary circle with whom he was arrested for brawling in September 1589, to Thomas Walsingham (although their paths may have crossed earlier, during Marlowe's own service to the late Sir Francis). Walsingham appreciated the dedication, and the introduction, with Marlowe becoming a frequent house-guest at Scadbury. Later dedications from other poets imply familiarity and affection, rather than the subservience and duty more common at the time. Walsingham was a mourner at Marlowe's funeral.

== Private life ==
Walsingham had married Audrey Shelton, the daughter of Sir Ralph Shelton of Shelton, Norfolk. He had a son and a daughter (who predeceased him). Audrey also predeceased him, in 1624.

The Walsinghams continued in royal esteem when James succeeded Elizabeth. Audrey, who may have been a more influential figure at court than her husband, was in part instrumental in securing James's succession, and they were appointed "keepers of the queen's wardrobe" when Queen Anne joined her husband in London. Wealth and royal honours rained on the family as a result of Anne's favour, in defiance of his unpromising beginnings as an impoverished third son.

Walsingham was involved in managing the affairs of an aged courtier and landowner Brian Annesley in October 1603 and a dispute between his daughters Grace Wildgose and Cordell Annesley.

When Walsingham died at Scadbury on 11 August 1630 he was a wealthy landowner. Walsingham left some money to the poor in Chislehurst and his servants, but most of the money went to his granddaughter Catherine. He was buried in the family chapel (Scadbury chapel) at St Nicholas's Church, Chislehurst.

His son Thomas succeeded him and also became the MP for Rochester as a Parliamentarian.

Parliament of England
Preceded by	Member of Parliament for Rochester; 1597–1614; With: Sir Edward Hoby 1604–1611; Sir Edward Sandys 1614	Succeeded by Henry Clerke; Sir Thomas Walsingham
Preceded by John Scott; John Leveson	Member of Parliament for Kent; 1614; With: Peter Manwood	Succeeded by Viscount Lisle; Sir George Fane
