= Leslie Hotson =

20th-century Canadian literary historian and critic

John Leslie Hotson
- Born: August 16, 1897; Delhi, Ontario
- Died: November 16, 1992 (aged 95); North Branford, Connecticut
- Education: Harvard University, AB., M.A. and Ph.D.
- Employer(s): Harvard University; Yale University; New York University; Haverford College (1931–1942)
- Known for: Elizabethan literary puzzles
- Spouse: Mary May Peabody

John Leslie Hotson (16 August 1897 – 16 November 1992) was a scholar of Elizabethan literary puzzles.

== Biography ==
He was born at Delhi, Ontario, on 16 August 1897. He studied at Harvard University, where he obtained an AB., M.A. and Ph.D. He went on to hold a number of academic posts.

Hotson was known for his tenacious archival research and his interest in coded information. He had a number of notable successes, but not all of his "decodings" have been accepted by other scholars. He discovered the identity of Ingram Frizer, the killer of Christopher Marlowe, and reconstructed the shape of the original Shakespearean theater. He also unearthed the letters that Percy Bysshe Shelley wrote to his divorced wife Harriet; produced evidence of Shakespeare's father as a wool dealer; illuminated Shakespeare's early years in Stratford-upon-Avon; and identified John Day as the killer of Henry Porter, a minor Elizabethan dramatist.

Some of his solutions to literary puzzles are still in dispute. He claimed to have identified one Nicholas Colfox as the murderer of Thomas of Woodstock by "decoding" Chaucer's The Nun's Priest's Tale. He also claimed to have identified Mr W H, the person to whom Shakespeare's sonnets were dedicated, as a William Hatcliffe of Lincolnshire. He later argued that a miniature colour portrait by Nicholas Hilliard depicted Shakespeare as a young man. As the New York Times stated in his obituary: "it was chiefly as a Shakespearian detective that Dr Hotson remained in the public eye, sometimes to the annoyance of rival scholars who discounted his theories."

His first major work, The Death of Christopher Marlowe — which made his name — is still in print. He stumbled across the evidence while decoding Chaucer's Nun's Priest's Tale in the archives of the English Public Records Office in 1923–24.

He died on 16 November 1992 in North Branford, Connecticut.

== Life summary ==
- Pacifist - served with Friends (Quaker) Relief Unit in France, 1918–1919
- Educated at Harvard (BA, MA, PhD) and Yale
- Married 1919, Mary May Peabody
- Fulbright Exchange Scholar at Bedford College, London
- Taught at Harvard, Yale (Research Associate) and New York University
- Guggenheim Fellow 1929 and 1930 in 16th and 17th Century English Literature
- Taught at Haverford College (1931–42)
- Second War – Officer in Signal Corps
- Fellow of King's College, Cambridge (England), 1954–60
- He is the author of many books of literary biography, criticism and detection, such as:
  - Colfox vs Chauntecleer 1924 PMLA XXXIX
  - The Death of Christopher Marlowe 1925
  - The Commonwealth and Restoration Stage 1929
  - Shakespeare versus Shallow 1931
  - The Adventure of a Single Rapier 1931
  - I, William Shakespeare
  - Shakespeare's Sonnets Dated
  - Shakespeare's Motley
  - The First Night of Twelfth Night, 1954
  - Shakespeare's Wooden O, 1959
  - Mr WH, 1964
  - Shakespeare by Hilliard, 1977
