= Christopher Marlowe =

English playwright and poet (1564–1593)

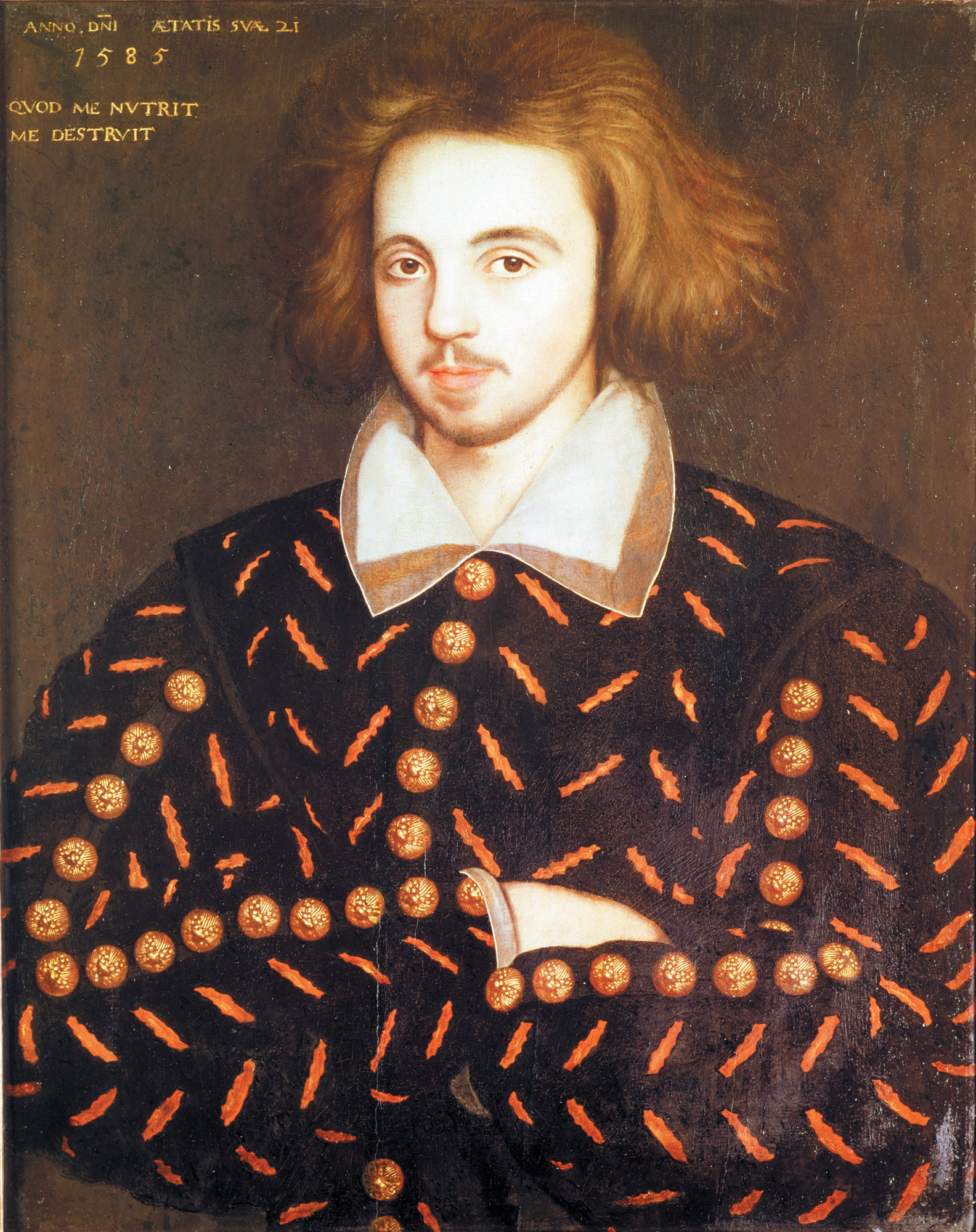
- Anonymous portrait, possibly of Marlowe, at Corpus Christi College, Cambridge
- Born: Canterbury, Kent, England
- Baptised: 26 February 1564
- Died: 30 May 1593 (aged 29); Deptford, Kent, England
- Resting place: Churchyard of St. Nicholas, Deptford; unmarked; memorial plaques inside and outside church
- Education: Corpus Christi College, Cambridge
- Occupations: Playwright; poet
- Years active: c. mid-1580s – 1593
- Era: Elizabethan
- Notable work: Hero and Leander; Tamburlaine the Great; Edward the Second; The Tragical History of Doctor Faustus; Dido, Queen of Carthage
- Movement: English Renaissance

Christopher Marlowe (/ˈmɑːrloʊ/ MAR-loh; baptised 26 February 1564 – 30 May 1593), also known as Kit Marlowe, was an English playwright, poet, and translator of the Elizabethan era. (Note: "Christopher Marlowe was baptised as 'Marlow,' but he spelled his name 'Marley' in his one known surviving signature.") Marlowe is among the most famous of the Elizabethan playwrights. Based upon the "many imitations" of his play Tamburlaine, modern scholars consider him to have been the foremost dramatist in London in the years just before his mysterious early death. (Note: "During Marlowe's lifetime, the popularity of his plays, Robert Greene's unintentionally elevating remarks about him as a dramatist in A Groatsworth of Wit, including the designation 'famous', and the many imitations of Tamburlaine suggest that he was for a brief time considered England's foremost dramatist." Logan also suggests consulting the business diary of Philip Henslowe, which is traditionally used by theatre historians to determine the popularity of Marlowe's plays.) Some scholars also believe that he greatly influenced William Shakespeare, who was baptised in the same year as Marlowe and later succeeded him as the preeminent Elizabethan playwright. (Note: No birth records, only baptismal records, have been found for Marlowe and Shakespeare, therefore any reference to a birthdate for either man probably refers to the date of their baptism.) Marlowe was the first to achieve critical reputation for his use of blank verse, which became the standard for the era. His plays are distinguished by their overreaching protagonists. Themes found within Marlowe's literary works have been noted as humanistic with realistic emotions, which some scholars find difficult to reconcile with Marlowe's "anti-intellectualism" and his catering to the prurient tastes of his Elizabethan audiences for generous displays of extreme physical violence, cruelty, and bloodshed.

Events in Marlowe's life were sometimes as extreme as those found in his plays. (Note: "...as one of the most influential current critics, Stephen Greenblatt frets, Marlowe's 'cruel, aggressive plays' seem to reflect a life also lived on the edge: 'a courting of disaster as reckless as any that he depicted on stage'.") Differing sensational reports of Marlowe's death in 1593 abounded after the event and are contested by scholars today owing to a lack of good documentation. There have been many conjectures as to the nature and reason for his death, including a vicious bar-room fight, blasphemous libel against the church, homosexual intrigue, betrayal by another playwright, and espionage from the highest level: the Privy Council of Elizabeth I. An official coroner's account of Marlowe's violent death was discovered only in 1925, and it did little to persuade all scholars that it told the whole story, nor did it eliminate the uncertainties present in his biography.

== Early life ==
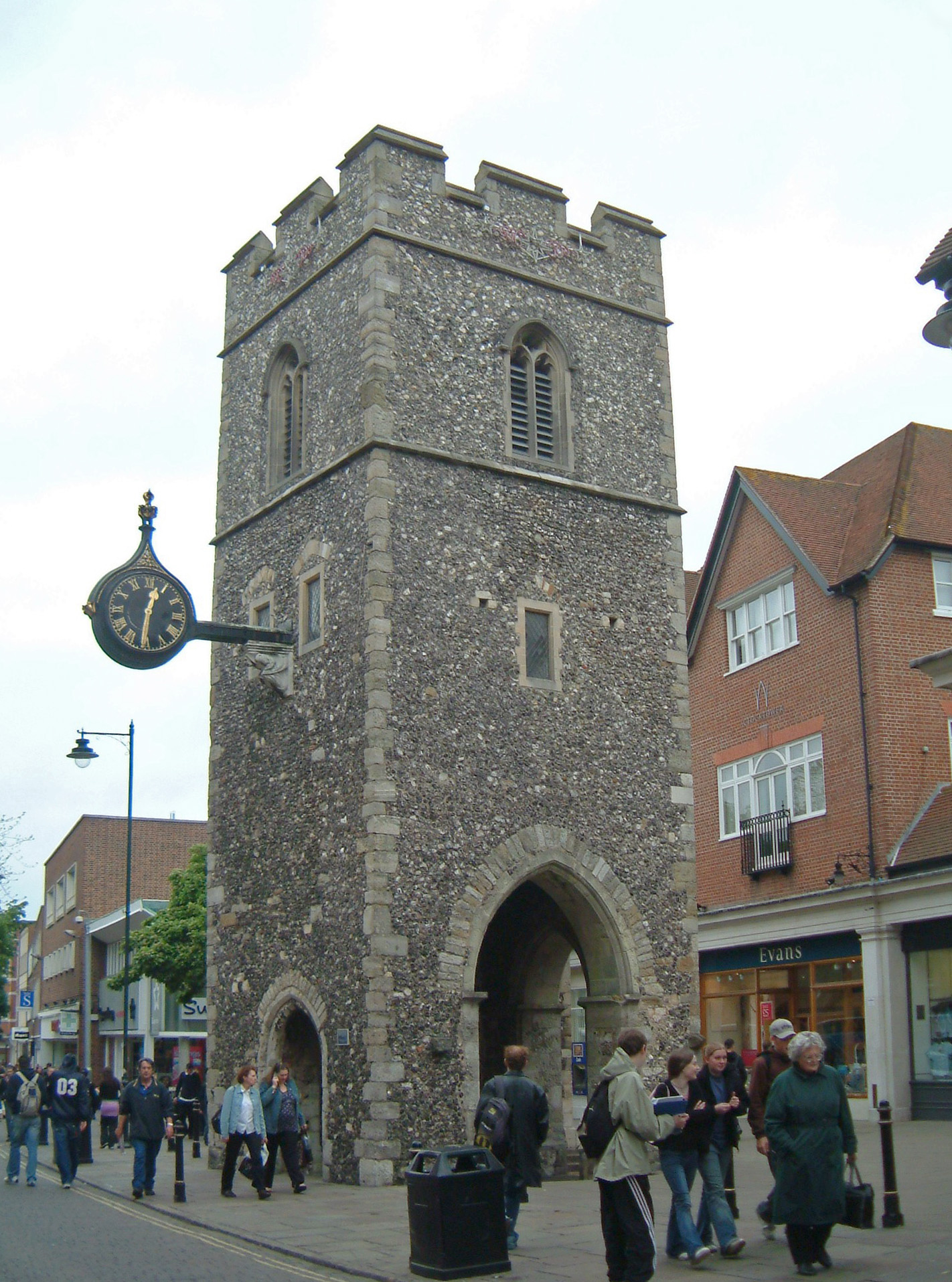
Marlowe was christened at St George's Church, Canterbury. The tower, shown here, is all that survived destruction during the Baedeker air raids of 1942.

Christopher Marlowe, the second of nine children, and oldest child after the death of his sister Mary in 1568, was born to Canterbury shoemaker John Marlowe and his wife Katherine, daughter of William Arthur of Dover. He was baptised at St George's Church, Canterbury, on 26 February 1564 (1563 in the old style dates in use at the time, which placed the new year on 25 March). Marlowe's birth was likely to have been a few days before, making him about two months older than William Shakespeare, who was baptised on 26 April 1564 in Stratford-upon-Avon.

By age 14, Marlowe was a pupil at The King's School, Canterbury on a scholarship (Note: The earliest record of Marlowe at The King's School is their payment for his scholarship of 1578/79, but Nicholl notes this was "unusually late" to start as a student and proposes he could have begun school earlier as a "fee-paying pupil".) and two years later a student at Corpus Christi College, Cambridge, where he also studied through a scholarship with expectation that he would become an Anglican clergyman. Instead, he received his Bachelor of Arts degree in 1584. Marlowe mastered Latin during his schooling, reading and translating the works of Ovid. In 1587, the university hesitated to award his Master of Arts degree because of a rumour that he intended to go to the English seminary at Rheims in northern France, presumably to prepare for ordination as a Roman Catholic priest. If true, such an action on his part would have been a direct violation of royal edict issued by Queen Elizabeth I in 1585 criminalising any attempt by an English citizen to be ordained in the Roman Catholic Church.

Large-scale violence between Protestants and Catholics on the European continent has been cited by scholars as the impetus for the Protestant English Queen's defensive anti-Catholic laws issued from 1581 until her death in 1603. Despite the dire implications for Marlowe, his degree was awarded on schedule when the Privy Council intervened on his behalf, commending him for his "faithful dealing" and "good service" to the Queen. The nature of Marlowe's service was not specified by the council, but its letter to the Cambridge authorities has provoked much speculation by modern scholars, notably the theory that Marlowe was operating as a secret agent for Privy Council member Sir Francis Walsingham. The only surviving evidence of the Privy Council's correspondence is found in their minutes, the letter being lost. There is no mention of espionage in the minutes, but its summation of the lost Privy Council letter is vague in meaning, stating that "it was not Her Majesties pleasure" that persons employed as Marlowe had been "in matters touching the benefit of his country should be defamed by those who are ignorant in th'affaires he went about." Scholars agree the vague wording was typically used to protect government agents, but they continue to debate what the "matters touching the benefit of his country" actually were in Marlowe's case and how they affected the 23-year-old writer as he began his literary career in 1587.

== Adult life and legend ==
Little is known about Marlowe's adult life. All available evidence, other than what can be deduced from his literary works, is found in legal records and other official documents. Writers of fiction and non-fiction have speculated about his professional activities, private life, and character. Marlowe has been described as a spy, a brawler, and a heretic, as well as a "magician", "duellist", "tobacco-user", "counterfeiter" and "rakehell". While J. A. Downie and Constance Kuriyama have argued against the more lurid speculations, J. B. Steane remarked, "it seems absurd to dismiss all of these Elizabethan rumours and accusations as 'the Marlowe myth'". Much has been written on his brief adult life, including speculation of: his involvement in royally sanctioned espionage; his vocal declaration of atheism; his (possibly same-sex) sexual interests; and the puzzling circumstances surrounding his mysterious death.

=== Spying ===
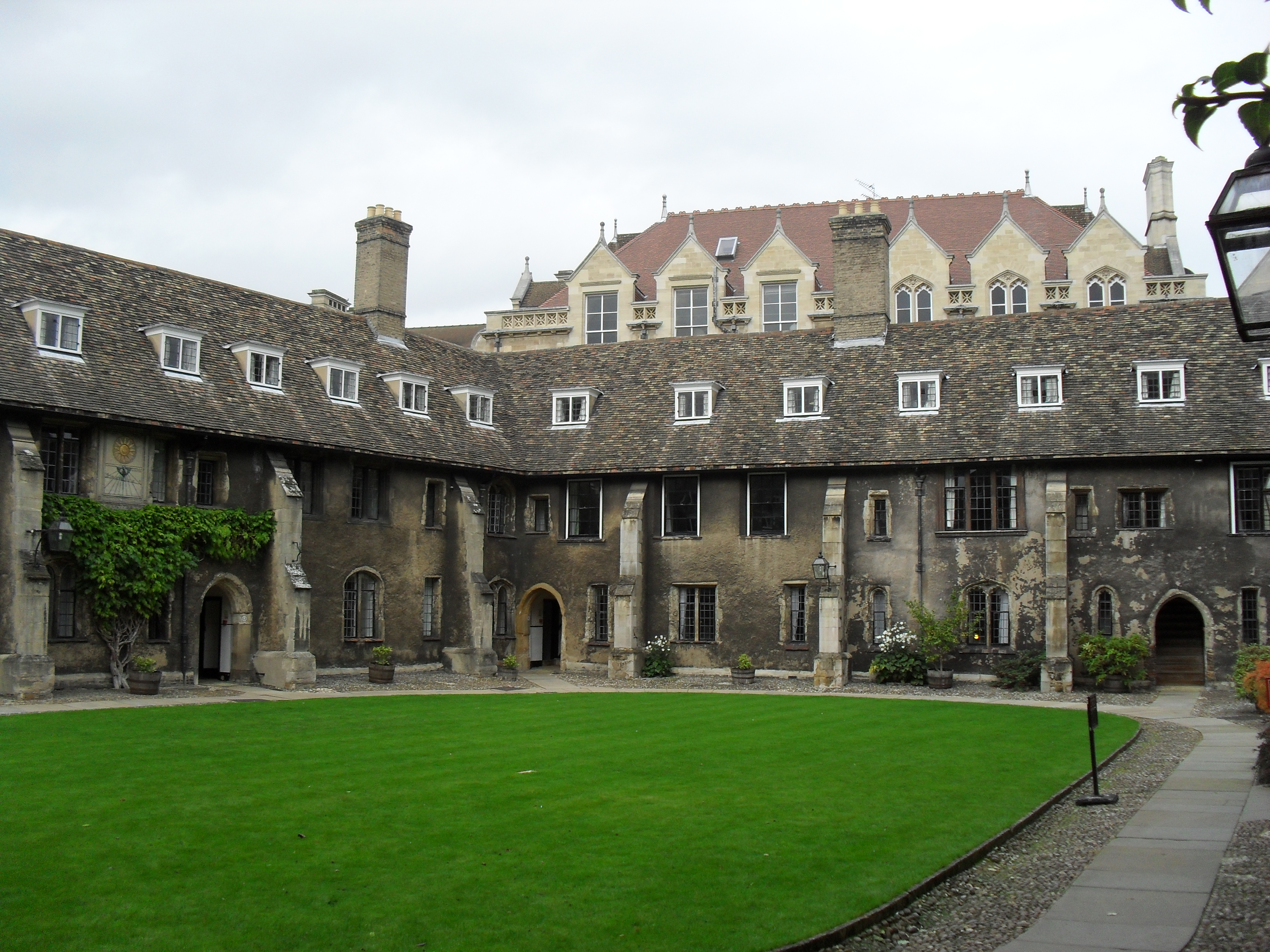
The corner of Old Court of Corpus Christi College, Cambridge, where Marlowe stayed while a Cambridge student and, possibly, during the time he was recruited as a spy

Marlowe is alleged to have been a government spy. Park Honan and Charles Nicholl speculate that this was the case and suggest that Marlowe's recruitment took place when he was at Cambridge. In 1587, when the Privy Council ordered the University of Cambridge to award Marlowe his degree as Master of Arts, it denied rumours that he intended to go to the English Catholic college in Rheims, saying instead that he had been engaged in unspecified "affaires" on "matters touching the benefit of his country". Surviving college records from the period also indicate that, in the academic year 1584–1585, Marlowe had a series of unusually lengthy absences from the university which violated university regulations. Surviving college buttery accounts, which record student purchases for personal provisions, show that Marlowe began spending lavishly on food and drink during the periods he was in attendance; the amount was more than he could have afforded on his known scholarship income. (Note: It is known that some poorer students worked as labourers on the Corpus Christi College chapel, then under construction, and were paid by the college with extra food. It has been suggested this may be the reason for the sums noted in Marlowe's entry in the buttery accounts.)

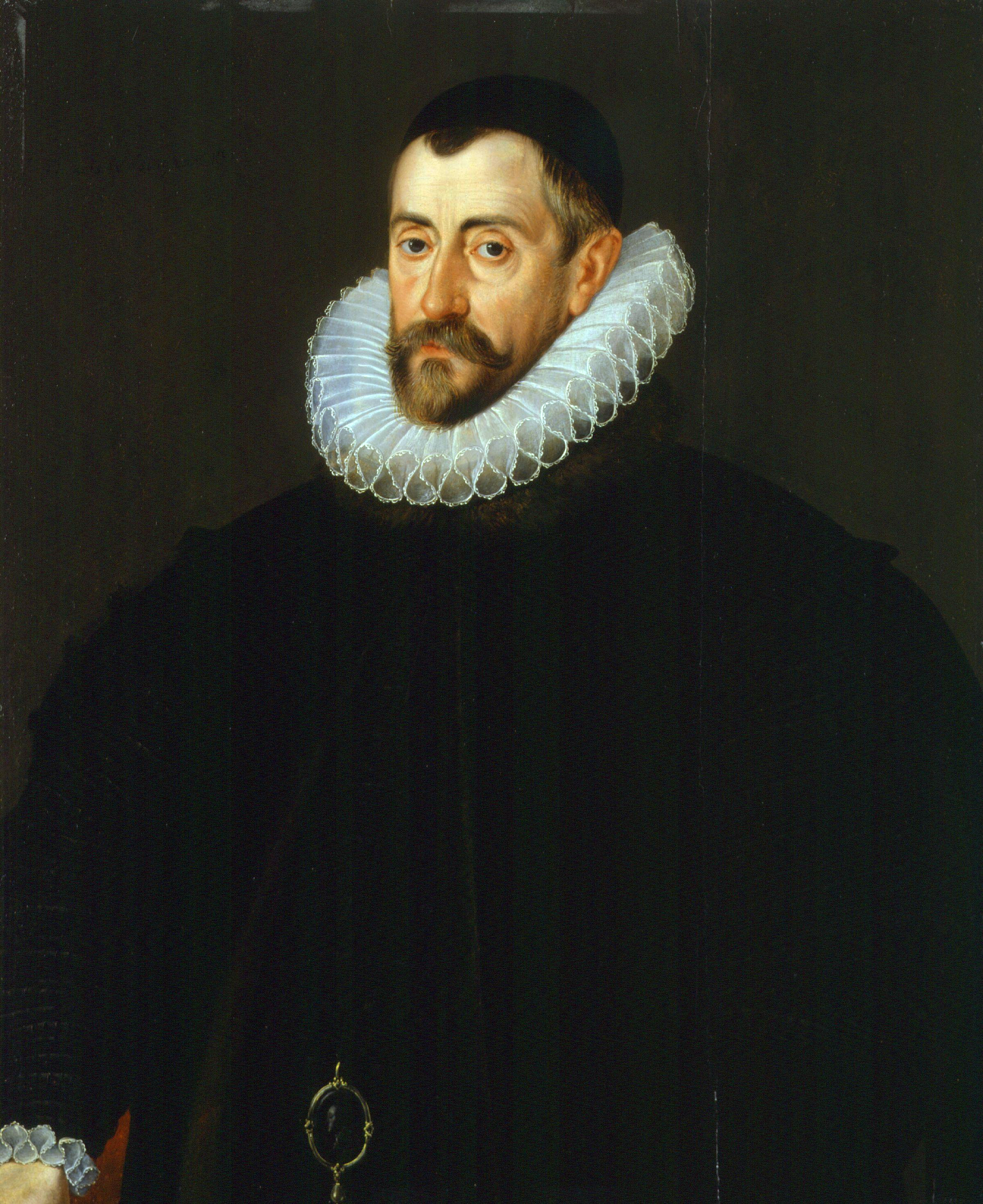
Portrait of alleged "spymaster" Sir Francis Walsingham c. 1585; attributed to John de Critz

It has been speculated that Marlowe was the "Morley" who was tutor to Arbella Stuart in 1589. (Note: He was described by Arbella's guardian, the Countess of Shrewsbury, as having hoped for an annuity of some £40 from Arbella, his being "so much damnified (i.e. having lost this much) by leaving the University.") This possibility was first raised in a Times Literary Supplement letter by E. St John Brooks in 1937; in a letter to Notes and Queries, John Baker has added that only Marlowe could have been Arbella's tutor owing to the absence of any other known "Morley" from the period with an MA and not otherwise occupied. If Marlowe was Arbella's tutor, it might indicate that he was there as a spy, since Arbella, niece of Mary, Queen of Scots, and cousin of James VI of Scotland, later James I of England, was at the time a strong candidate for the succession to Elizabeth's throne. Frederick S. Boas dismisses the possibility of this identification, based on surviving legal records which document Marlowe's "residence in London between September and December 1589". Marlowe had been party to a fatal quarrel involving his neighbours and the poet Thomas Watson in Norton Folgate and was held in Newgate Prison for a fortnight. In fact, the quarrel and his arrest occurred on 18 September, he was released on bail on 1 October and he had to attend court, where he was acquitted on 3 December, but there is no record of where he was for the intervening two months.

In 1592 Marlowe was arrested in the English garrison town of Flushing (Vlissingen) in the Netherlands, for alleged involvement in the counterfeiting of coins, presumably related to the activities of seditious Catholics. He was sent to the Lord Treasurer (Burghley), but no charge or imprisonment resulted. This arrest may have disrupted another of Marlowe's spying missions, perhaps by giving the resulting coinage to the Catholic cause. He was to infiltrate the followers of the active Catholic plotter William Stanley and report back to Burghley.

=== Philosophy ===
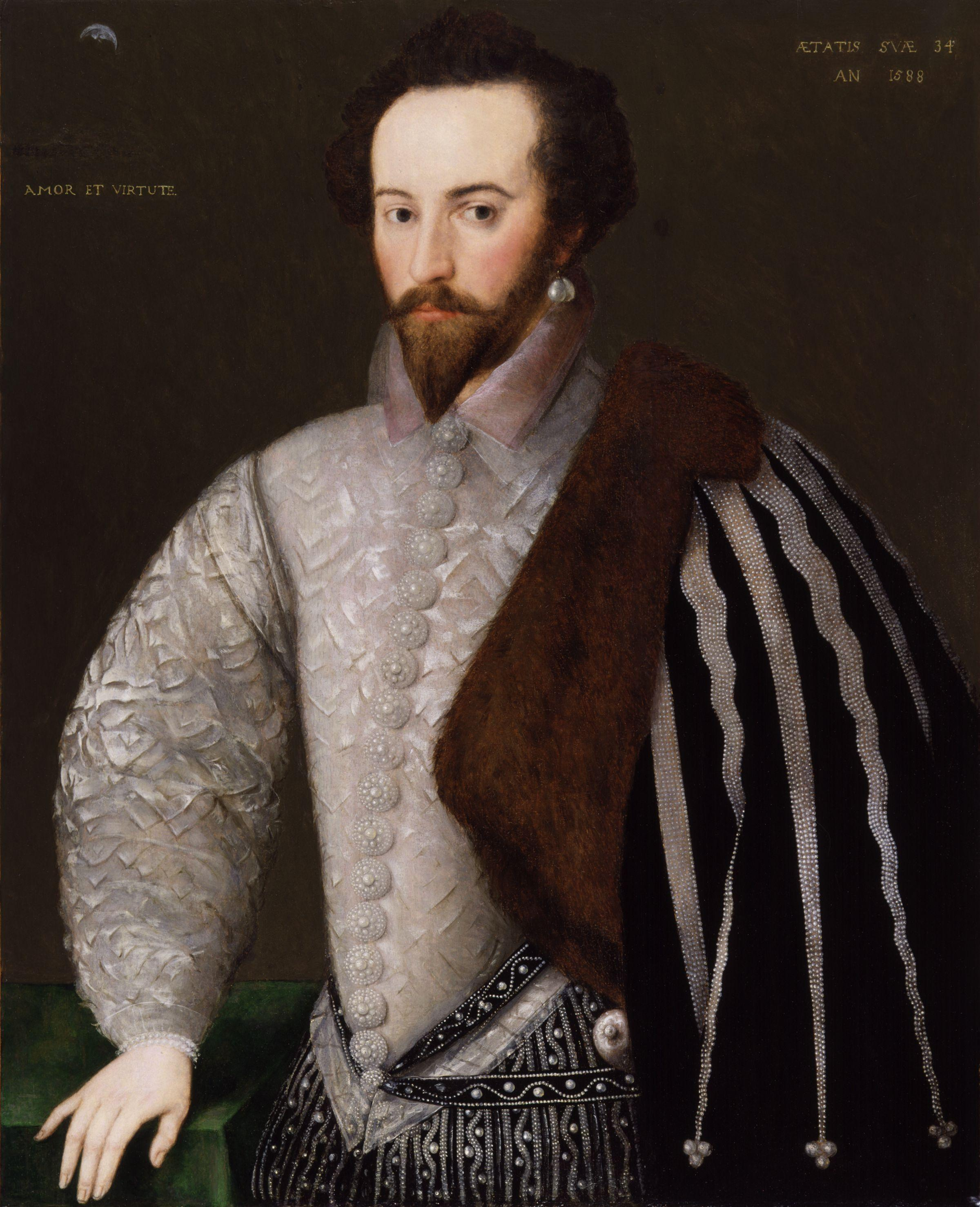
Sir Walter Raleigh, shown here in 1588, was the alleged centre of the "School of Atheism" c. 1592.

Marlowe was reputed to be an atheist, which held the dangerous implication of being an enemy of God and, by association, the state. With the rise of public fears concerning The School of Night, or "School of Atheism" in the late 16th century, accusations of atheism were closely associated with disloyalty to the Protestant monarchy of England.

Some modern historians consider that Marlowe's professed atheism, as with his supposed Catholicism, may have been no more than a sham to further his work as a government spy. Contemporary evidence comes from Marlowe's accuser in Flushing, an informer called Richard Baines. The governor of Flushing had reported that each of the men had "of malice" accused the other of instigating the counterfeiting and of intending to go over to the Catholic "enemy"; such an action was considered atheistic by the Church of England. Following Marlowe's arrest in 1593, Baines submitted to the authorities a "note containing the opinion of one Christopher Marly concerning his damnable judgment of religion, and scorn of God's word". Baines attributes to Marlowe a total of eighteen items which "scoff at the pretensions of the Old and New Testament" such as, "Christ was a bastard and his mother dishonest [unchaste]", "the woman of Samaria and her sister were whores and that Christ knew them dishonestly", "St John the Evangelist was bedfellow to Christ and leaned always in his bosom" (cf. John 13:23–25) and "that he used him as the sinners of Sodom". He also implied that Marlowe had Catholic sympathies. Other passages are merely sceptical in tone: "he persuades men to atheism, willing them not to be afraid of bugbears and hobgoblins". The final paragraph of Baines's document reads:

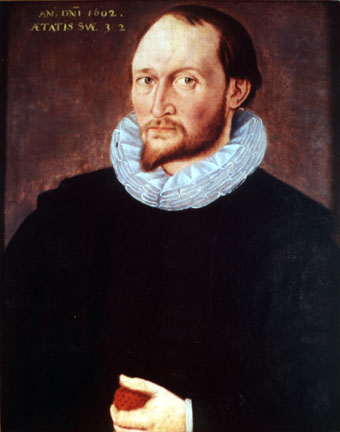
Portrait often claimed to be Thomas Harriot (1602), which hangs in Trinity College, Oxford

These thinges, with many other shall by good & honest witnes be approved to be his opinions and Comon Speeches, and that this Marlowe doth not only hould them himself, but almost into every Company he Cometh he persuades men to Atheism willing them not to be afeard of bugbeares and hobgoblins, and vtterly scorning both god and his ministers as I Richard Baines will Justify & approue both by mine oth and the testimony of many honest men, and almost al men with whome he hath Conversed any time will testify the same, and as I think all men in Cristianity ought to indevor that the mouth of so dangerous a member may be stopped, he saith likewise that he hath quoted a number of Contrarieties oute of the Scripture which he hath giuen to some great men who in Convenient time shalbe named. When these thinges shalbe Called in question the witnes shalbe produced.

Similar examples of Marlowe's statements were given by Thomas Kyd after his imprisonment and possible torture (see above); Kyd and Baines connect Marlowe with mathematician Thomas Harriot's and Sir Walter Raleigh's circle. Another document claimed about that time that "one Marlowe is able to show more sound reasons for Atheism than any divine in England is able to give to prove divinity, and that ... he hath read the Atheist lecture to Sir Walter Raleigh and others". (Note: The so-called 'Remembrances' against Richard Cholmeley.)

Some critics believe that Marlowe sought to disseminate these views in his work and that he identified with his rebellious and iconoclastic protagonists. Plays had to be approved by the Master of the Revels before they could be performed and the censorship of publications was under the control of the Archbishop of Canterbury. Presumably these authorities did not consider any of Marlowe's works to be unacceptable other than the Amores.

=== Sexuality ===
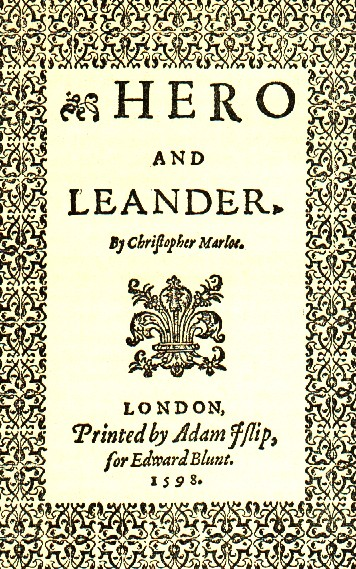
Title page to 1598 edition of Marlowe's Hero and Leander

It has been claimed that Marlowe was homosexual. Some scholars argue that the identification of an Elizabethan as such in the modern sense is "anachronistic," saying that for the Elizabethans the terms were more likely to have been applied to homoerotic affections or sexual acts rather than to what we currently understand as a settled sexual orientation or personal role identity. Other scholars argue that the evidence is inconclusive and that the reports of Marlowe's homosexuality may be rumours produced after his death. Richard Baines reported Marlowe as saying: "all they that love not Tobacco & Boies were fools". David Bevington and Eric C. Rasmussen describe Baines's evidence as "unreliable testimony" and "[t]hese and other testimonials need to be discounted for their exaggeration and for their having been produced under legal circumstances we would now regard as a witch-hunt".

Literary scholar J. B. Steane considered there to be "no evidence for Marlowe's homosexuality at all". Other scholars point to the frequency with which Marlowe explores homosexual themes in his writing: in Hero and Leander, Marlowe writes of the male youth Leander: "in his looks were all that men desire..." Edward the Second contains the following passage enumerating homosexual relationships:

The mightiest kings have had their minions;
Great Alexander loved Hephaestion,
The conquering Hercules for Hylas wept;
And for Patroclus, stern Achilles drooped.
And not kings only, but the wisest men:
The Roman Tully loved Octavius,
Grave Socrates, wild Alcibiades.

Marlowe wrote the only play about the life of Edward II up to his time, taking the humanist literary discussion of male sexuality much further than his contemporaries. The play was extremely bold, dealing with a star-crossed love story between Edward II and Piers Gaveston. Though it was a common practice at the time to reveal characters as homosexual to give audiences reason to suspect them as culprits in a crime, Christopher Marlowe's Edward II is portrayed as a sympathetic character. The decision to start the play Dido, Queen of Carthage with a homoerotic scene between Jupiter and Ganymede that bears no connection to the subsequent plot has long puzzled scholars.

=== Arrest and death ===
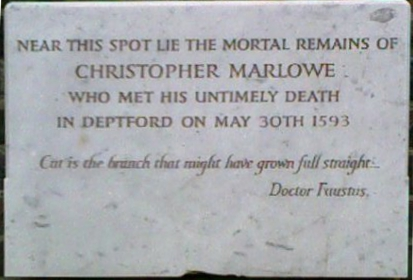
Marlowe was buried in an unmarked grave in the churchyard of St Nicholas, Deptford. This modern plaque is on the east wall of the churchyard.

In early May 1593, several bills were posted about London threatening the Protestant refugees from France and the Netherlands who had settled in the city. One of these, the "Dutch church libel", written in rhymed iambic pentameter, contained allusions to several of Marlowe's plays and was signed, "Tamburlaine". On 11 May 1593 the Privy Council ordered the arrest of those responsible for the libels. The next day, Marlowe's colleague Thomas Kyd was arrested and when his lodgings were searched, a three-page fragment of a heretical tract was found. On being charged with atheism and tortured, Kyd declared the document to be Marlowe's, and to have been shuffled together with his own papers when they were writing together in the same chamber two years previously. In a second letter, Kyd said they had both been working for an aristocratic patron (probably Ferdinando Stanley), and he described Marlowe as blasphemous, disorderly, holding treasonous opinions, being an irreligious reprobate and "intemperate & of a cruel hart". A warrant for Marlowe's arrest was issued on 18 May 1593, when the Privy Council apparently knew that he might be found staying with Thomas Walsingham, whose father was a first cousin of the late Sir Francis Walsingham, Elizabeth's principal secretary in the 1580s and a man more deeply involved in state espionage than any other member of the Privy Council. Marlowe duly presented himself on 20 May 1593 but there apparently being no Privy Council meeting on that day, was instructed to "give his daily attendance on their Lordships, until he shall be licensed to the contrary". On Wednesday, 30 May 1593, Marlowe was killed.

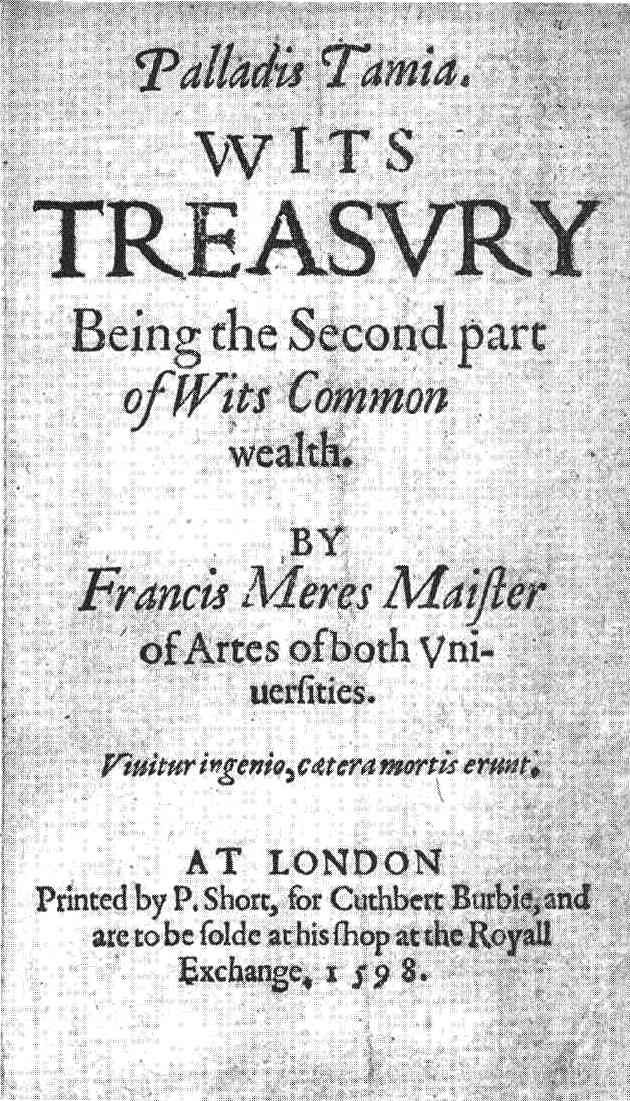
Title page to the 1598 edition of Palladis Tamia by Francis Meres, which contains one of the earliest descriptions of Marlowe's death

Various accounts of Marlowe's death were current over the next few years. In his Palladis Tamia, published in 1598, Francis Meres says Marlowe was "stabbed to death by a bawdy serving-man, a rival of his in his lewd love" as punishment for his "epicurism and atheism". In 1917, in the Dictionary of National Biography, Sir Sidney Lee wrote, on slender evidence, that Marlowe was killed in a drunken fight. His claim was not much at variance with the official account, which came to light only in 1925, when the scholar Leslie Hotson discovered the coroner's report of the inquest on Marlowe's death, held two days later on Friday 1 June 1593, by the Coroner of the Queen's Household, William Danby. Marlowe had spent all day in a house in Deptford, owned by the widow Eleanor Bull, with three men: Ingram Frizer, Nicholas Skeres and Robert Poley. All three had been employed by one or other of the Walsinghams. Skeres and Poley had helped snare the conspirators in the Babington plot, and Frizer was a servant to Thomas Walsingham, probably acting as a financial or business agent, as he was for Walsingham's wife Audrey a few years later. These witnesses testified that Frizer and Marlowe had argued over payment of the bill (now famously known as the "Reckoning"), exchanging "divers malicious words", while Frizer was sitting at a table between the other two and Marlowe was lying behind him on a couch. Marlowe snatched Frizer's dagger and wounded him on the head. According to the coroner's report, in the ensuing struggle Marlowe was stabbed above the right eye, killing him instantly. The jury concluded that Frizer acted in self-defence and within a month he was pardoned. Marlowe was buried in an unmarked grave in the churchyard of St. Nicholas, Deptford, immediately after the inquest, on 1 June 1593.

The complete text of the inquest report was published by Leslie Hotson in his book, The Death of Christopher Marlowe, in the introduction to which Professor George Lyman Kittredge wrote: "The mystery of Marlowe's death, heretofore involved in a cloud of contradictory gossip and irresponsible guess-work, is now cleared up for good and all on the authority of public records of complete authenticity and gratifying fullness". However, this confidence proved to be fairly short-lived. Hotson had considered the possibility that the witnesses had "concocted a lying account of Marlowe's behaviour, to which they swore at the inquest, and with which they deceived the jury", but decided against that scenario. Others began to suspect that this theory was indeed the case. Writing to the Times Literary Supplement shortly after the book's publication, Eugénie de Kalb disputed that the struggle and outcome as described were even possible, and Samuel A. Tannenbaum insisted the following year that such a wound could not have possibly resulted in instant death, as had been claimed. Even Marlowe's biographer John Bakeless acknowledged that "some scholars have been inclined to question the truthfulness of the coroner's report. There is something queer about the whole episode", and said that Hotson's discovery "raises almost as many questions as it answers". It has also been discovered more recently that the apparent absence of a local county coroner to accompany the Coroner of the Queen's Household would, if noticed, have made the inquest null and void.

One of the main reasons for doubting the truth of the inquest concerns the reliability of Marlowe's companions as witnesses. As an agent provocateur for the late Sir Francis Walsingham, Robert Poley was a consummate liar, the "very genius of the Elizabethan underworld", and was on record as saying "I will swear and forswear myself, rather than I will accuse myself to do me any harm". The other witness, Nicholas Skeres, had for many years acted as a confidence trickster, drawing young men into the clutches of people involved in the money-lending racket, including Marlowe's apparent killer, Ingram Frizer, with whom he was engaged in such a swindle. Despite their being referred to as generosi (gentlemen) in the inquest report, the witnesses were professional liars. Some biographers, such as Kuriyama and Downie, take the inquest to be a true account of what occurred, but in trying to explain what really happened if the account was not true, others have come up with a variety of murder theories:

- Jealous of her husband Thomas's relationship with Marlowe, Audrey Walsingham arranged for the playwright to be murdered.
- Sir Walter Raleigh arranged the murder, fearing that under torture Marlowe might incriminate him.
- With Skeres the main player, the murder resulted from attempts by the Earl of Essex to use Marlowe to incriminate Sir Walter Raleigh.
- He was killed on the orders of father and son Lord Burghley and Sir Robert Cecil, who thought that his plays contained Catholic propaganda.
- He was accidentally killed while Frizer and Skeres were pressuring him to pay back money he owed them.
- Marlowe was murdered at the behest of several members of the Privy Council, who feared that he might reveal them to be atheists.
- The Queen ordered his assassination because of his subversive atheistic behaviour.
- Frizer murdered him because he envied Marlowe's close relationship with his master Thomas Walsingham and feared the effect that Marlowe's behaviour might have on Walsingham's reputation.
- Marlowe's death was faked to save him from trial and execution for subversive atheism. (Note: "Useful research has been stimulated by the infinitesimally thin possibility that Marlowe did not die when we think he did. ... History holds its doors open.")

Since there are only written documents on which to base any conclusions, and since it is probable that the most crucial information about his death was never committed to paper, it is unlikely that the full circumstances of Marlowe's death will ever be known.

== Reputation among contemporary writers ==
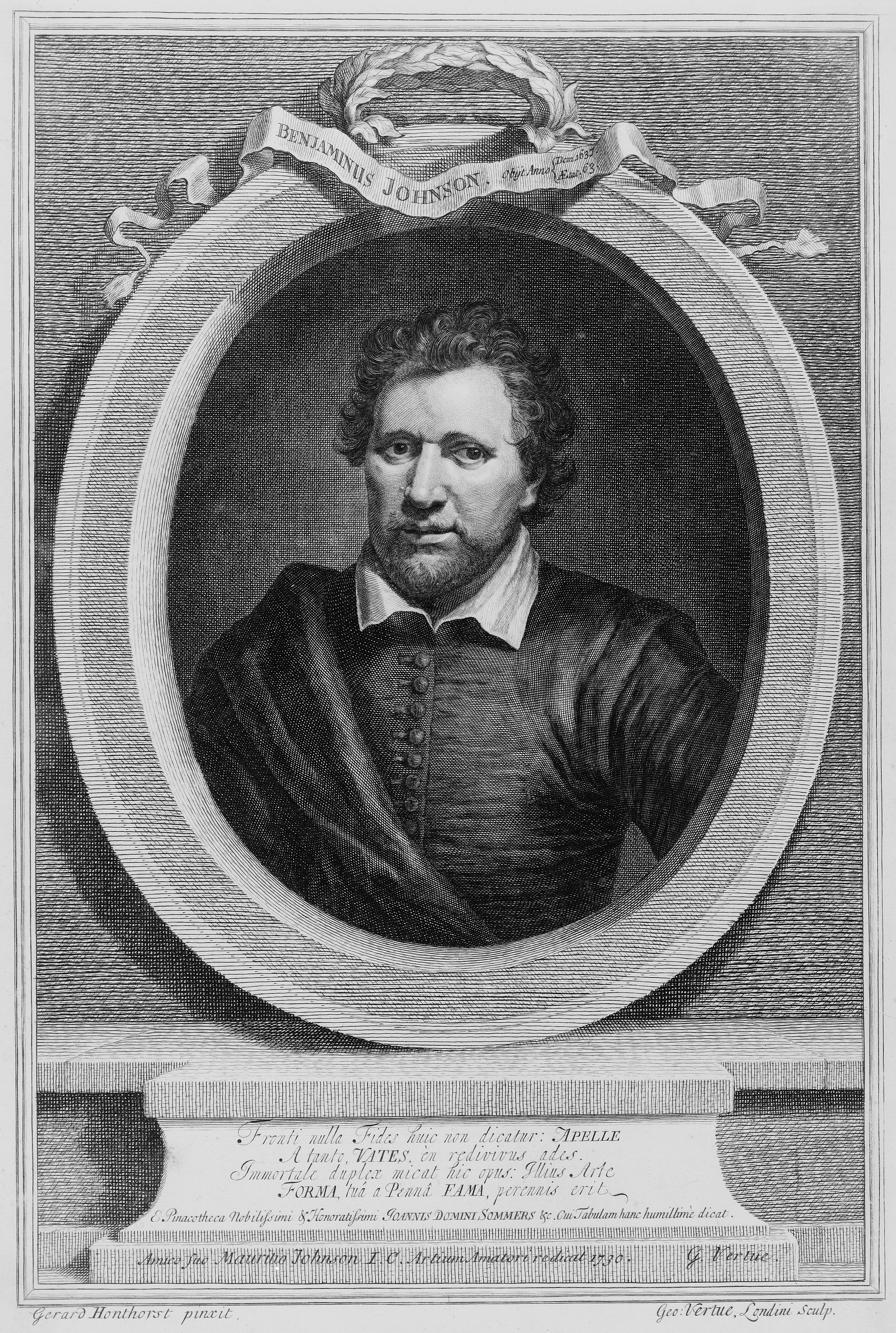
Ben Jonson, leading satirist of the Elizabethan and Jacobean eras, was one of the first to acknowledge Marlowe for the power of his dramatic verse.

For his contemporaries in the literary world, Marlowe was above all an admired and influential artist. Within weeks of his death, George Peele remembered him as "Marley, the Muses' darling"; Michael Drayton noted that he "Had in him those brave translunary things / That the first poets had" and Ben Jonson even wrote of "Marlowe's mighty line". Thomas Nashe wrote warmly of his friend, "poor deceased Kit Marlowe," as did the publisher Edward Blount in his dedication of Hero and Leander to Sir Thomas Walsingham. Among the few contemporary dramatists to say anything negative about Marlowe was the anonymous author of the Cambridge University play The Return from Parnassus (1598) who wrote, "Pity it is that wit so ill should dwell, / Wit lent from heaven, but vices sent from hell".

The most famous tribute to Marlowe was paid by Shakespeare in As You Like It, where he not only quotes a line from Hero and Leander ("Dead Shepherd, now I find thy saw of might, 'Who ever lov'd that lov'd not at first sight?'") but also gives to the clown Touchstone the words "When a man's verses cannot be understood, nor a man's good wit seconded with the forward child, understanding, it strikes a man more dead than a great reckoning in a little room." This appears to be a reference to Marlowe's murder which involved a fight over the "reckoning," the bill, as well as to a line in Marlowe's Jew of Malta, "Infinite riches in a little room."

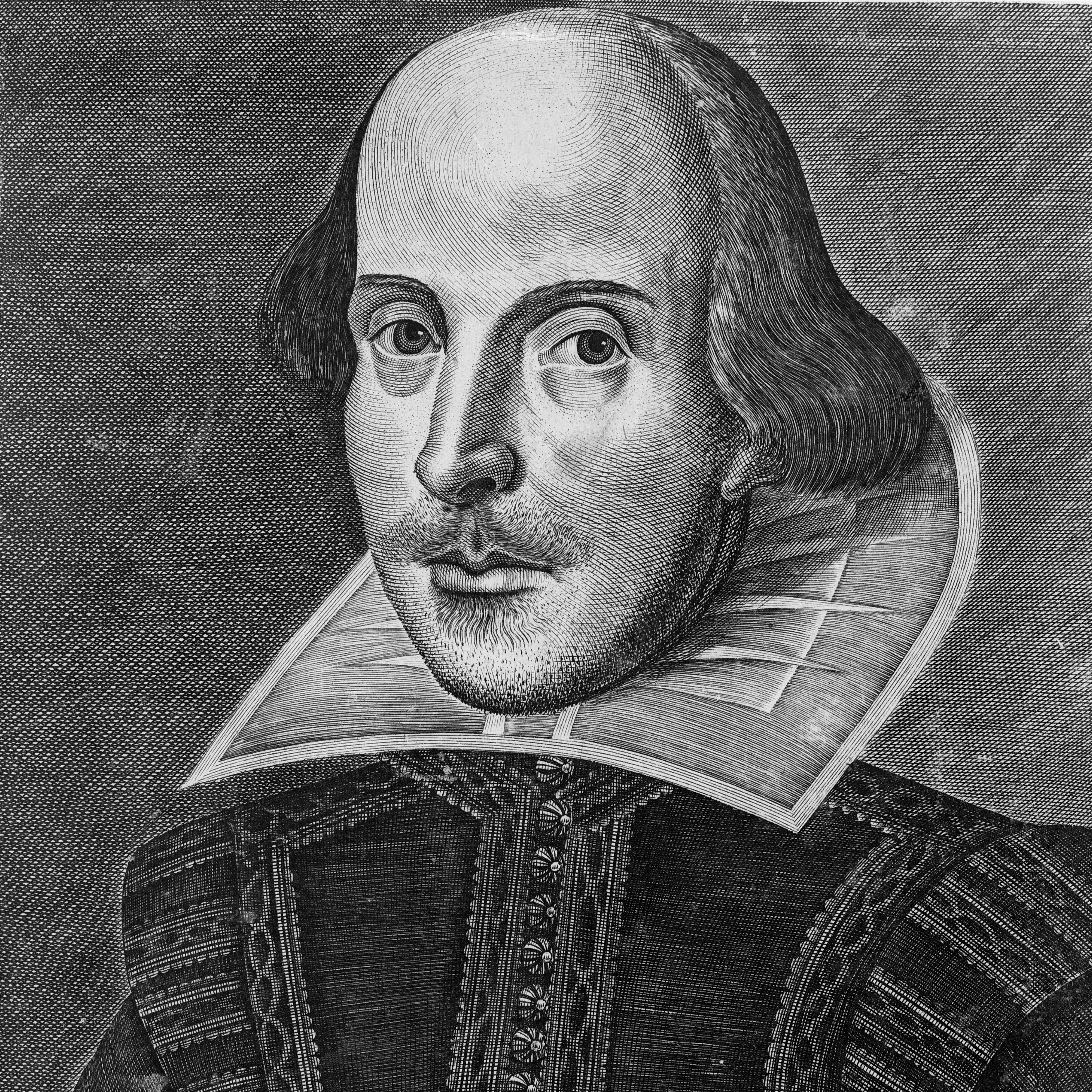
The influence of Marlowe upon William Shakespeare is evidenced by the Marlovian themes and other allusions to Marlowe found in Shakespeare's plays and sonnets.

Shakespeare was much influenced by Marlowe in his work, as can be seen in the use of Marlovian themes in Antony and Cleopatra, The Merchant of Venice, Richard II and Macbeth (Dido, Jew of Malta, Edward II and Doctor Faustus, respectively). In Hamlet, after meeting with the travelling actors, Hamlet requests the Player perform a speech about the Trojan War, which at 2.2.429–432 has an echo of Marlowe's Dido, Queen of Carthage. In Love's Labour's Lost Shakespeare brings on a character "Marcade" (three syllables) in conscious acknowledgement of Marlowe's character "Mercury", also attending the King of Navarre, in Massacre at Paris. The significance, to those of Shakespeare's audience who were familiar with Hero and Leander, was Marlowe's identification of himself with the god Mercury.

== Shakespeare authorship theory ==
A fringe theory has arisen about the notion that Marlowe faked his death and then continued to write under the assumed name of William Shakespeare. Academic consensus rejects alternative candidates for authorship of Shakespeare's plays and sonnets, including Marlowe.

== Literary career ==
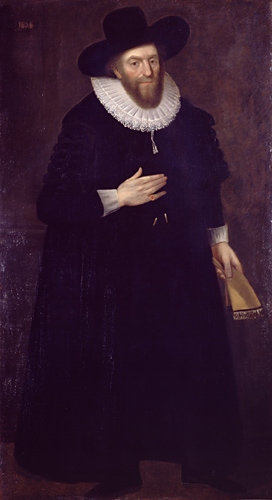
Edward Alleyn, lead actor of Lord Strange's Men was possibly the first to play the title characters in Doctor Faustus, Tamburlaine, and The Jew of Malta.

=== Plays ===
Six dramas have been attributed to the authorship of Christopher Marlowe either alone or in collaboration with other writers, with varying degrees of evidence. The writing sequence or chronology of these plays is mostly unknown and is offered here with any dates and evidence known. Among the little available information, Dido is believed to be the first Marlowe play performed, while Tamburlaine was first to be performed on a regular commercial stage in London in 1587. Believed by many scholars to be Marlowe's greatest success, Tamburlaine was the first English play written in blank verse and, with Thomas Kyd's The Spanish Tragedy, is generally considered the beginning of the mature phase of the Elizabethan theatre.

The play Lust's Dominion was attributed to Marlowe upon its initial publication in 1657, though scholars and critics have almost unanimously rejected the attribution. He may also have written or co-written Arden of Faversham.

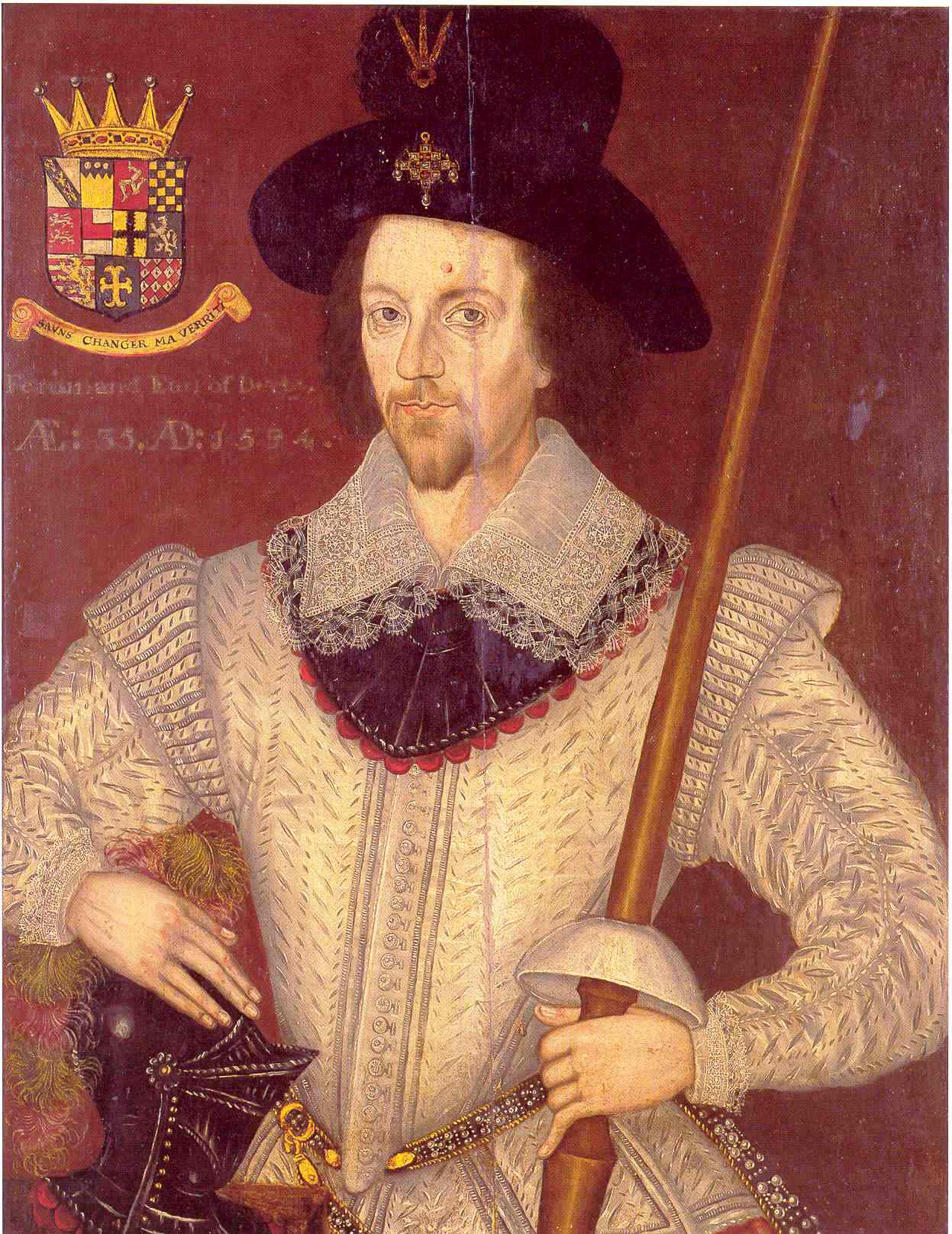
Ferdinando Stanley, 5th Earl of Derby, aka "Ferdinando, Lord Straunge," was patron of some of Marlowe's early plays as performed by Lord Strange's Men.

=== Poetry and translations ===
Publication and responses to the poetry and translations credited to Marlowe primarily occurred posthumously, including:

- Amores, first book of Latin elegiac couplets by Ovid with translation by Marlowe (c. 1580s); copies publicly burned as offensive in 1599.
- The Passionate Shepherd to His Love, by Marlowe. (c. 1587–1588); a popular lyric of the time.
- Hero and Leander, by Marlowe (c. 1593, unfinished; completed by George Chapman, 1598; printed 1598).
- Pharsalia, Book One, by Lucan with translation by Marlowe. (c. 1593; printed 1600)

=== Collaborations ===
Modern scholars still look for evidence of collaborations between Marlowe and other writers. In 2016, one publisher was the first to endorse the scholarly claim of a collaboration between Marlowe and the playwright William Shakespeare:

- Henry VI by William Shakespeare is now credited as a collaboration with Marlowe in the New Oxford Shakespeare series, published in 2016. Marlowe appears as co-author of the three Henry VI plays, though some scholars doubt any actual collaboration.

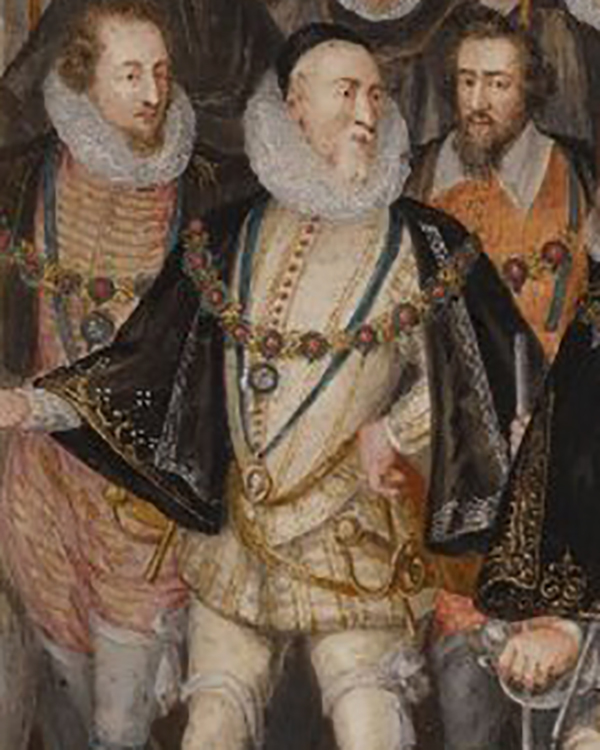
Charles Howard, 1st Earl of Nottingham, Lord High Admiral, shown here c. 1601 in a procession for Elizabeth I, was patron of the Admiral's Men during Marlowe's lifetime.

=== Contemporary reception ===
Marlowe's plays were enormously successful, possibly because of the imposing stage presence of his lead actor, Edward Alleyn. Alleyn was unusually tall for the time and the haughty roles of Tamburlaine, Faustus and Barabas were probably written for him. Marlowe's plays were the foundation of the repertoire of Alleyn's company, the Admiral's Men, throughout the 1590s. One of Marlowe's poetry translations did not fare as well. In 1599, Marlowe's translation of Ovid was banned and copies were publicly burned as part of Archbishop Whitgift's crackdown on offensive material.

== Chronology of dramatic works ==
(Patrick Cheney's 2004 Cambridge Companion to Christopher Marlowe presents an alternative timeline based upon printing dates.)

=== Dido, Queen of Carthage (c. 1585–1587) ===
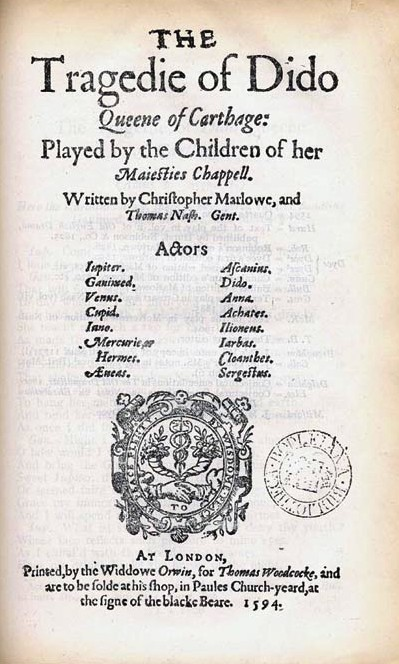
Title page of the 1594 first edition of Dido, Queen of Carthage

First official record 1594

First published 1594; posthumously

First recorded performance between 1587 and 1593 by the Children of the Chapel, a company of boy actors in London.

Significance This play is believed by many scholars to be the first play by Christopher Marlowe to be performed.

Attribution The title page attributes the play to Marlowe and Thomas Nashe, yet some scholars question how much of a contribution Nashe made to the play.

Evidence No manuscripts by Marlowe exist for this play.

=== Tamburlaine, Part I (c. 1587); Part II (c. 1587–1588) ===
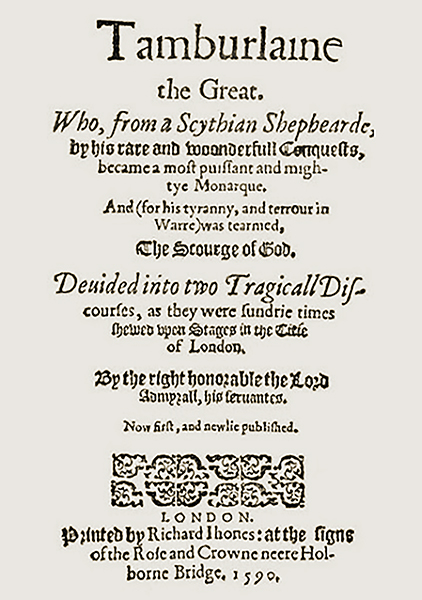
Title page of the earliest published edition of Tamburlaine (1590)

First official record 1587, Part I

First published 1590, Parts I and II in one octavo, London. No author named.

First recorded performance 1587, Part I, by the Admiral's Men, London. (Note: Performing company is listed on the title page of the 1590 octavo. Henslowe's diary first lists Tamburlaine performances in 1593, so the original playhouse is unknown.)

Significance Tamburlaine is the first example of blank verse used in the dramatic literature of the Early Modern English theatre.

Attribution Author name is missing from first printing in 1590. Attribution of this work by scholars to Marlowe is based upon comparison to his other verified works. Passages and character development in Tamburlane are similar to many other Marlowe works.

Evidence No manuscripts by Marlowe exist for this play. Parts I and II were entered into the Stationers' Register on 14 August 1590. The two parts were published together by the London printer, Richard Jones, in 1590; a second edition in 1592, and a third in 1597. The 1597 edition of the two parts were published separately in quarto by Edward White; part I in 1605, and part II in 1606.

=== The Jew of Malta (c. 1589–1590) ===
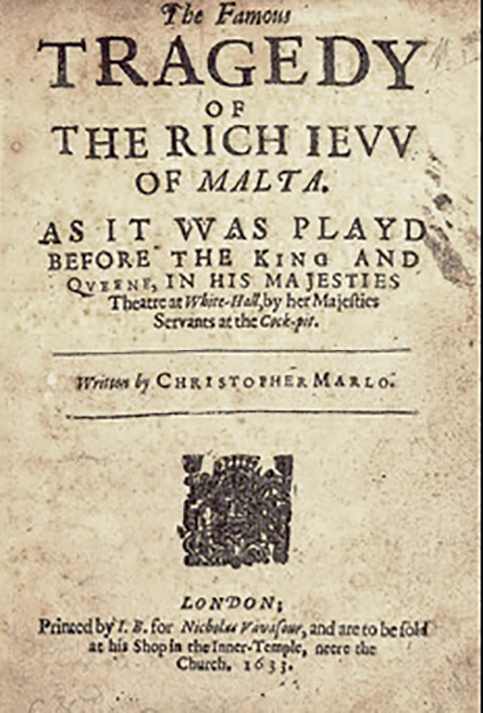
The Jew of Malta title page from 1633 quarto

First official record 1592

First published 1592; earliest extant edition, 1633

First recorded performance 26 February 1592, by Lord Strange's acting company.

Significance The performances of the play were a success and it remained popular for the next fifty years. This play helps to establish the strong theme of "anti-authoritarianism" that is found throughout Marlowe's works.

Evidence No manuscripts by Marlowe exist for this play. The play was entered in the Stationers' Register on 17 May 1594 but the earliest surviving printed edition is from 1633.

=== Doctor Faustus (c. 1588–1592) ===
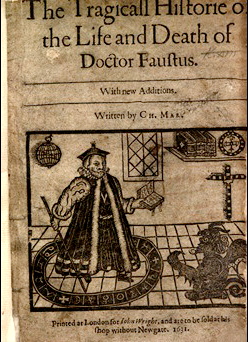
Frontispiece to a 1631 printing of Doctor Faustus showing Faustus conjuring Mephistophilis

First official record 1594–1597

First published 1601, no extant copy; first extant copy, 1604 (A text) quarto; 1616 (B text) quarto.

First recorded performance 1594–1597; 24 revival performances occurred between these years by the Lord Admiral's Company, Rose Theatre, London; earlier performances probably occurred around 1589 by the same company.

Significance This is the first dramatised version of the Faust legend of a scholar's dealing with the devil. Marlowe deviates from earlier versions of "The Devil's Pact" significantly: Marlowe's protagonist is unable to "burn his books" or repent to a merciful God to have his contract annulled at the end of the play; he is carried off by demons; and, in the 1616 quarto, his mangled corpse is found by the scholar characters.

Attribution The 'B text' was highly edited and censored, owing in part to the shifting theatre laws regarding religious words onstage during the seventeenth-century. Because it contains several additional scenes believed to be the additions of other playwrights, particularly Samuel Rowley and William Bird (alias Borne), a recent edition attributes the authorship of both versions to "Christopher Marlowe and his collaborator and revisers." This recent edition has tried to establish that the 'A text' was assembled from Marlowe's work and another writer, with the 'B text' as a later revision.

Evidence No manuscripts by Marlowe exist for this play. The two earliest-printed extant versions of the play, A and B, form a textual problem for scholars. Both were published after Marlowe's death and scholars disagree which text is more representative of Marlowe's original. Some editions are based on a combination of the two texts. Late-twentieth-century scholarly consensus identifies 'A text' as more representative because it contains irregular character names and idiosyncratic spelling, which are believed to reflect the author's handwritten manuscript or "foul papers". In comparison, 'B text' is highly edited with several additional scenes possibly written by other playwrights.

=== Edward the Second (c. 1592) ===
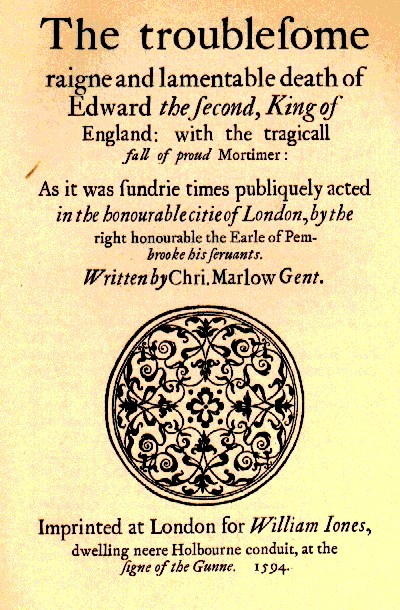
Title page of the earliest published text of Edward II (1594)

First official record 1593

First published 1590; earliest extant edition 1594 octavo

First recorded performance 1592, performed by the Earl of Pembroke's Men.

Significance Considered by recent scholars as Marlowe's "most modern play" because of its probing treatment of the private life of a king and unflattering depiction of the power politics of the time. The 1594 editions of Edward II and of Dido are the first published plays with Marlowe's name appearing as the author.

Attribution Earliest extant edition of 1594.

Evidence The play was entered into the Stationers' Register on 6 July 1593, five weeks after Marlowe's death.

=== The Massacre at Paris (c. 1589–1593) ===
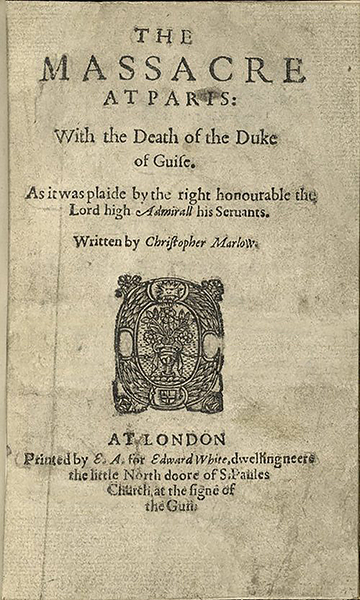
Title page to a rare extant printed copy of The Massacre at Paris by Christopher Marlowe; undated.

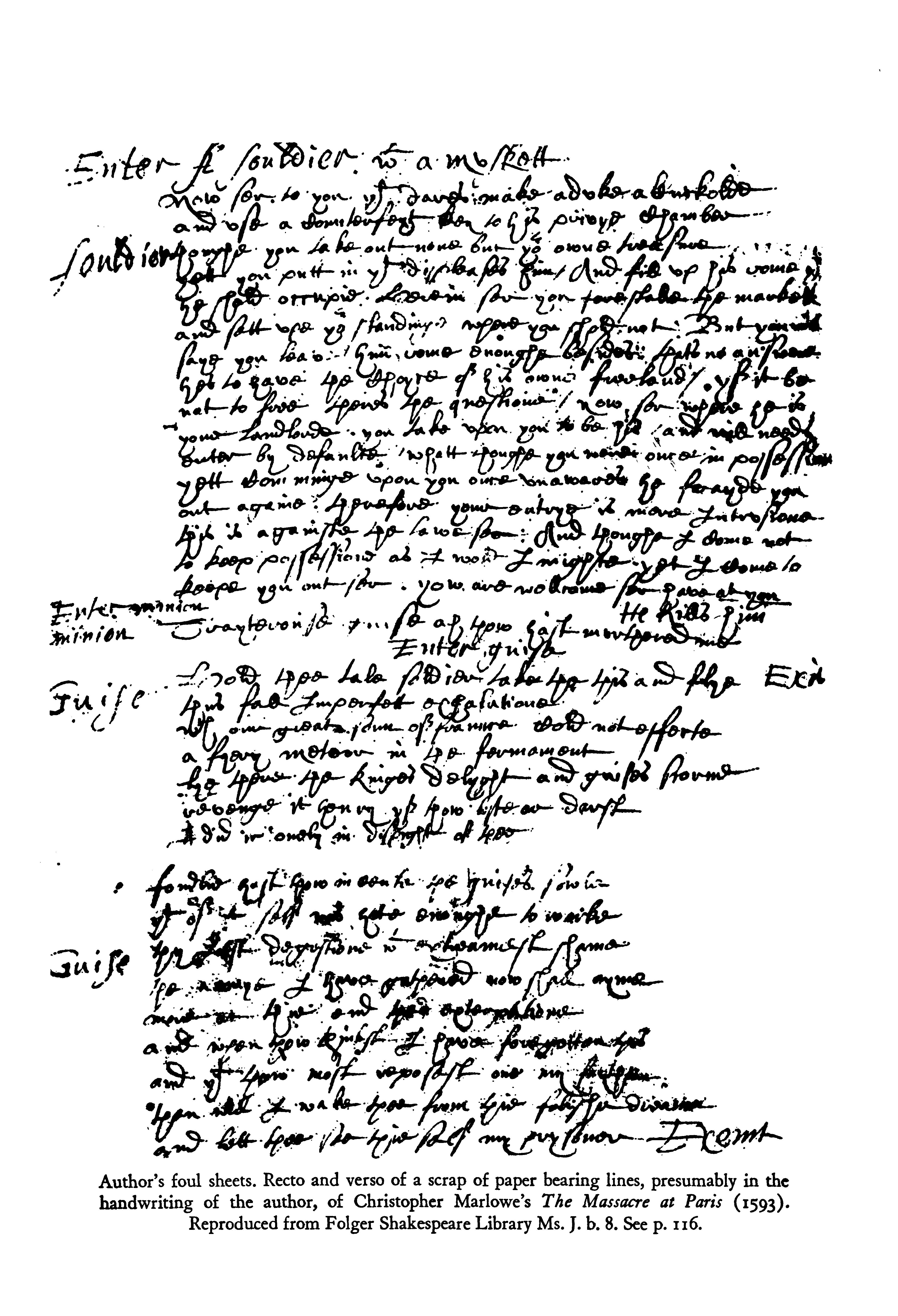
Alleged foul sheet from Marlowe's writing of The Massacre at Paris (1593). Reproduced from Folger Shakespeare Library Ms.J.b.8. Recent scholars consider this manuscript part of a "reconstruction" by another hand.

First official record c. 1593, alleged foul sheet by Marlowe of "Scene 19"; although authorship by Marlowe is contested by recent scholars, the manuscript is believed written while the play was first performed and with an unknown purpose.

First published undated, c. 1594 or later, octavo, London; while this is the most complete surviving text, it is near half the length of Marlowe's other works and possibly a reconstruction. The printer and publisher credit, "E.A. for Edward White," also appears on the 1605/06 printing of Marlowe's Tamburlaine.

First recorded performance 26 January 1593, by Lord Strange's Men, at Henslowe's Rose Theatre, London, under the title The Tragedy of the Guise; 1594, in the repertory of the Admiral's Men.

Significance The Massacre at Paris is considered Marlowe's most dangerous play, as agitators in London seized on its theme to advocate the murders of refugees from the low countries of the Spanish Netherlands, and it warns Elizabeth I of this possibility in its last scene. It features the silent "English Agent", whom tradition has identified with Marlowe and his connexions to the secret service. Highest grossing play for Lord Strange's Men in 1593.

Attribution A 1593 loose manuscript sheet of the play, called a foul sheet, is alleged to be by Marlowe and has been claimed by some scholars as the only extant play manuscript by the author. It could also provide an approximate date of composition for the play. When compared with the extant printed text and his other work, other scholars reject the attribution to Marlowe. The only surviving printed text of this play is possibly a reconstruction from memory of Marlowe's original performance text. Current scholarship notes that there are only 1147 lines in the play, half the amount of a typical play of the 1590s. Other evidence that the extant published text is not Marlowe's original is the uneven style throughout, with two-dimensional characterisations, deteriorating verbal quality and repetitions of content.

Evidence Never appeared in the Stationer's Register.

== Memorials ==
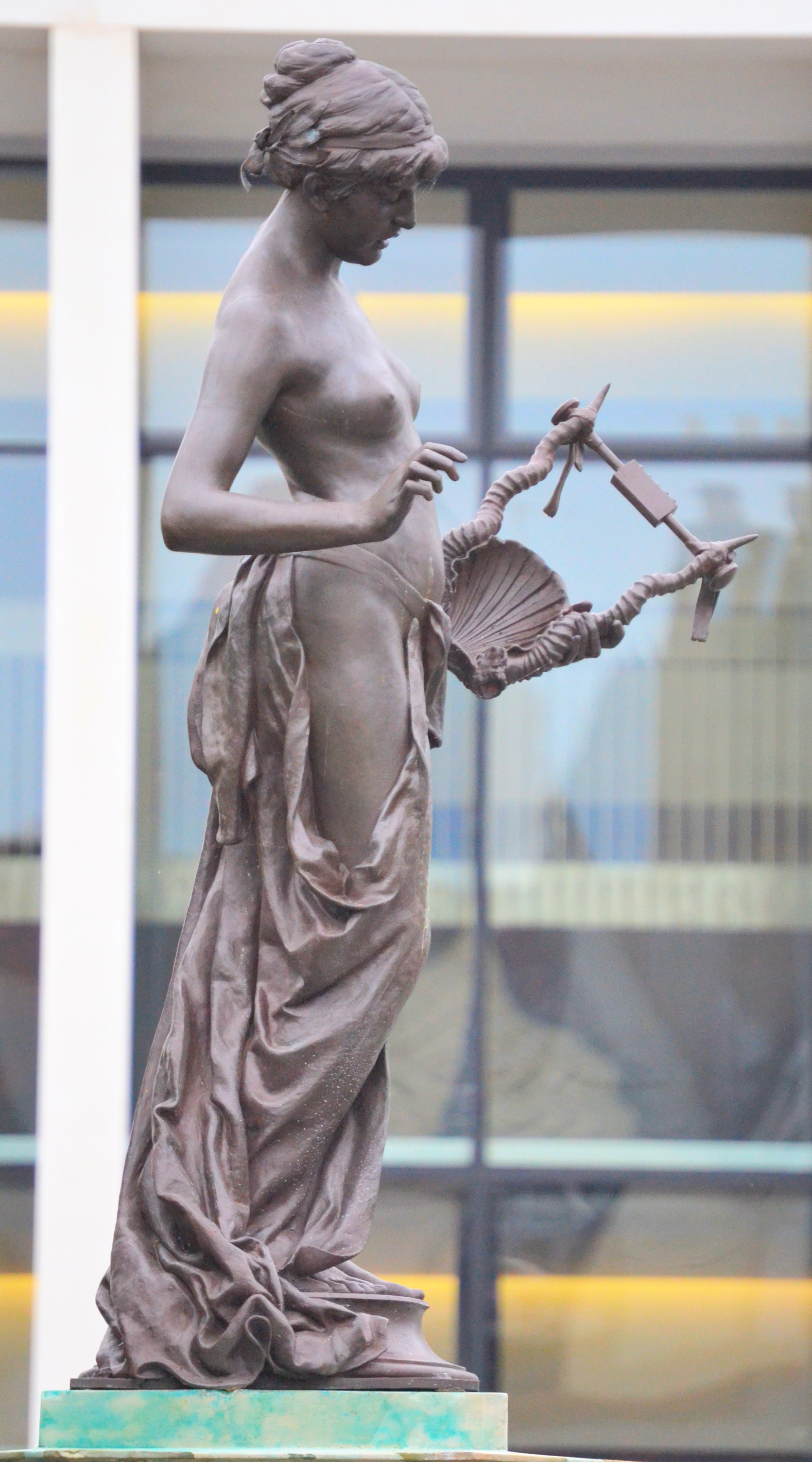
The Muse of Poetry, part of the Marlowe Memorial in Canterbury

The Muse of Poetry, a bronze sculpture by Edward Onslow Ford references Marlowe and his work. It was erected on Buttermarket, Canterbury in 1891, and now stands outside the Marlowe Theatre in the city.

In July 2002, a memorial window to Marlowe was unveiled by the Marlowe Society at Poets' Corner in Westminster Abbey. Controversially, a question mark was added to his generally accepted date of death. On 25 October 2011 a letter from Paul Edmondson and Stanley Wells was published by The Times newspaper, in which they called on the Dean and Chapter to remove the question mark on the grounds that it "flew in the face of a mass of unimpugnable evidence". In 2012, they renewed this call in their e-book Shakespeare Bites Back, adding that it "denies history" and again the following year in their book Shakespeare Beyond Doubt.

The Marlowe Theatre in Canterbury, Kent, UK, was named for Marlowe in 1949.

== Marlowe in fiction ==
Marlowe has been used as a character in books, theatre, film, television and radio.

== Modern compendia ==
Modern scholarly collected works of Marlowe include:

- The Complete Works of Christopher Marlowe (edited by Roma Gill in 1986; Clarendon Press published in partnership with Oxford University Press)
- The Complete Plays of Christopher Marlowe (edited by J. B. Steane in 1969; edited by Frank Romany and Robert Lindsey, Revised Edition, 2004, Penguin)

== Works of Marlowe in performance ==
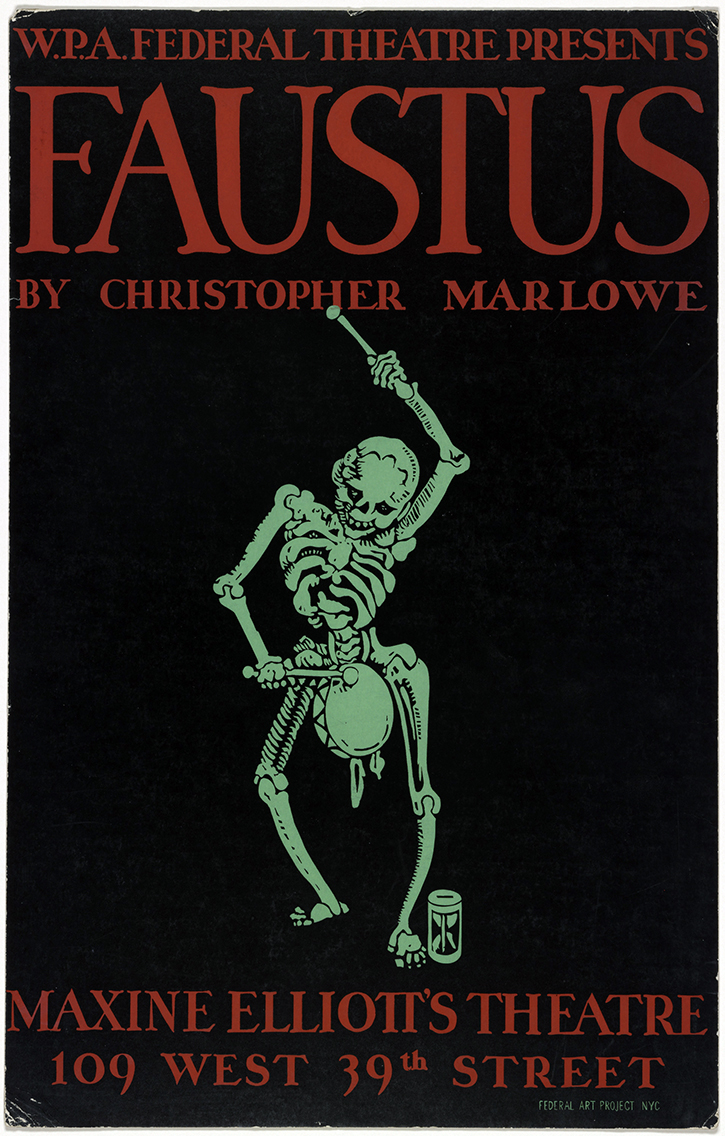
Poster for the 1937, New York WPA Federal Theatre Project production of Doctor Faustus

=== Radio ===
- BBC Radio broadcast adaptations of Marlowe's six plays from May to October 1993.

=== Royal Shakespeare Company ===
Royal Shakespeare Company

- Dido, Queen of Carthage, directed by Kimberly Sykes, with Chipo Chung as Dido. Swan Theatre, 2017.
- Tamburlaine the Great, directed by Terry Hands, with Anthony Sher as Tamburlaine. Swan Theatre, 1992; Barbican Theatre, 1993.
- Tamburlaine the Great directed by Michael Boyd, with Jude Owusu as Tamburlaine. Swan Theatre, 2018.
- The Jew of Malta, directed by Barry Kyle, with Jasper Britton as Barabas. Swan Theatre, 1987; People's Theatre, and Barbican Theatre, 1988.
- The Jew of Malta, directed by Justin Audibert, with Jasper Britton as Barabas. Swan Theatre, 2015.
- Edward II, directed by Gerard Murphy, with Simon Russell Beale as Edward. Swan Theatre, 1990.
- Edward II, directed by Daniel Raggett, with Daniel Evans as Edward. Swan Theatre, 2025.
- Doctor Faustus, directed by John Barton, with Ian McKellen as Faustus. Nottingham Playhouse and Aldwych Theatre, 1974, and Royal Shakespeare Theatre, 1975.
- Doctor Faustus directed by Barry Kyle with Gerard Murphy as Faustus, Swan Theatre and Pit Theatre, 1989.
- Doctor Faustus directed by Maria Aberg, with Sandy Grierson and Oliver Ryan sharing the roles of Faustus and Mephistophilis. Swan Theatre and Barbican Theatre, 2016.

=== Royal National Theatre ===
Royal National Theatre

- Tamburlaine, directed by Peter Hall, with Albert Finney as Tamburlaine. Olivier Theatre, 1976.
- Dido, Queen of Carthage, directed by James McDonald with Anastasia Hille as Dido. Cottesloe Theatre, 2009.
- Edward II, directed by Joe Hill-Gibbins, with John Heffernan as Edward. Olivier Theatre, 2013.

=== Shakespeare's Globe ===
Shakespeare's Globe

- Dido, Queen of Carthage, directed by Tim Carroll, with Rakie Ayola as Dido, 2003.
- Edward II, directed by Timothy Walker, with Liam Brennan as Edward, 2003.
- Doctor Faustus, directed by Matthew Dunster, with Paul Hilton as Doctor Faustus and Arthur Darvill as Mephistopheles:, 2011.

=== Malthouse Theatre ===
The Marlowe Sessions

- Dido, Queen of Carthage, Directed/Produced by Ray Mia, Performance direction by Stephen Unwin, with Thalissa Teixeira as Dido, 2022.
- Tamburlaine The Great, Part 1, Directed/Produced by Ray Mia, Performance direction by Phillip Breen, with Alan Cox as Tamburlaine, 2022.
- The Jew of Malta, Directed/Produced by Ray Mia, Performance direction by Stephen Unwin, with Adrian Schiller as Barrabus, 2022.
- Tamburlaine the Great, Part 2, Directed/Produced by Ray Mia, Performance direction by Phillip Breen, with Alan Cox as Tamburlaine, 2022.
- Edward the Second, Directed/Produced by Ray Mia, Performance direction by Abigail Rokison, with Jack Holden as Edward II, 2022.
- The Massacre at Paris, Directed/Produced by Ray Mia, Performance direction by Abigail Rokison, with Michael Maloney as Guise, 2022.
- Dr Faustus, Directed/Produced by Ray Mia, Performance direction by Phillip Breen, with Dominic West as Faustus and Talulah Riley as Mephistopheles, 2022.
- The Poetry of Christopher Marlowe, Directed/Produced by Ray Mia, Performance direction by Philip Bird, read by Jack Holden, Fisayo Akinade and Philip Bird, 2022.

=== Other stage ===
- Tamburlaine. Yale University, 1919.
- Tamburlaine, directed by Tyrone Guthrie, with Donald Wolfit as Tamburlaine. The Old Vic, 1951.
- Doctor Faustus, co-directed by Orson Welles and John Houseman, with Welles as Faustus and Jack Carter as Mephistopheles. Maxine Elliott's Theatre, 1937.
- Doctor Faustus, directed by Adrian Noble. Royal Exchange, 1981.
- Edward II, directed by Toby Robertson, with John Barton as Edward. Cambridge, 1951.
- Edward II, directed by Toby Robertson, with Derek Jacobi as Edward. Cambridge, 1958.
- Edward II, directed by Toby Robertson, with Ian McKellen as Edward. Assembly Rooms, 1969.
- Edward II, directed by Jim Stone, Washington Stage Company, 1993;
- Edward II, directed by Jozsef Ruszt. Budapest, 1998;
- Edward II, directed by Michael Grandage, with Joseph Fiennes as Edward. Crucible Theatre, 2001.
- The Massacre in Paris, directed by Patrice Chéreau. France, 1972.

=== Stage adaptations ===
- Edward II, Phoenix Society, London, 1923.
- Leben Eduards des Zweiten von England, by Bertolt Brecht (the first play he directed). Munich Chamber Theatre, Germany, 1924.
- The Life of Edward II of England, by Marlowe and Bertold Brecht, directed by Frank Dunlop. National Theatre, 1968.
- Edward II, adapted as a ballet, choreographed by David Bintley. Stuttgart Ballet, 1995.
- Doctor Faustus, additional text by Colin Teevan, directed by Jamie Lloyd, with Kit Harington as Faustus. Duke of York's Theatre, 2016.
- Faustus, That Damned Woman by Chris Bush, directed by Caroline Byrne. Lyric Theatre, 2020.

=== Film ===
- Doctor Faustus, based on Nevill Coghill's 1965 production, adapted for Richard Burton and Elizabeth Taylor, 1967.
- Edward II, directed by Derek Jarman, 1991.
- Faust, with some Marlowe dialogue, directed by Jan Švankmajer, 1994.
