= Keen City =

Creative production company

Keen City Ltd. (formerly Keen City Productions Ltd from 2010–2012) is a creative production company based in London. Founded in 2008, and named after a line in the poem "The Moon's a Balloon" by e e Cummings, Keen City are a team of writers, directors and producers who make performance-driven narrative content.

Their first film, Alleyman, won a British Lion Award for Achievement at the British Independent Film Awards, 2011 Keen City was behind Forget Me Not.

== Short films ==
- Alleyman (2011) IMDb Directed by Andrew Ellinas.
- Darkest Before Dawn (2011) Directed by Leah Stipic.
- The Tyrant's Cup (2012) IMDb, Directed by Nick Goulden.
- Child, (2012) Directed by George Watson.
- Lonesome, (2012) Directed by Francis Wallis.
- 12, (2014) Directed by George Watson.
- Lucky Bastards, (2015) Directed by Andrew Ellinas.
- Reality Mine, (2015) Directed by Nick Goulden.
- Forget Me Not, (2019) Directed by Nick Goulden

== Selected Awards and nominations ==
- Winner: Best Drama - Portobello Film Festival
- Winner: Best Drama - Dam Short Film Festival
- Winner: Best Short - Zero Plus Film Festival
- Winner: Special Award - Zero Plus Film Festival
- Longlisted: - Best British Short Film - BAFTA
- Finalist: Light in Motion Award for Best Drama - Foyle Film Festival
- Finalist: Best British Short Film - British British Independent Film Festival
- Nominated: Best Short Film - Norwich Film Festival
- Nominated: Best British Short Film, Best Lead Actor - James Cosmo, Best Supporting Actress - Ruby Royle, Best Production Design - Southampton Film Festival
- Finalist: Best Director, Best Composer - L.I.M.P.A London Film Festival
- Nominated: Best Film - Alicante Film Festival
- Nominated: Best Film - New Haven Film Festival
- Nominated: Best Film - Madrid Independent Film Festival
- Nominated: Best Film - Cinemagic Film Festival
- Nominated: Best Fiction Short Film - Picknic Film Festival
- Nominated: Best Film - Ciudad De La Linea Film Festival
- Winner: British Lion Award - British Independent Film Festival
- Honourable Mention - Los Angeles Film Festival
