= Marc Sylvan =

English composer and sound designer

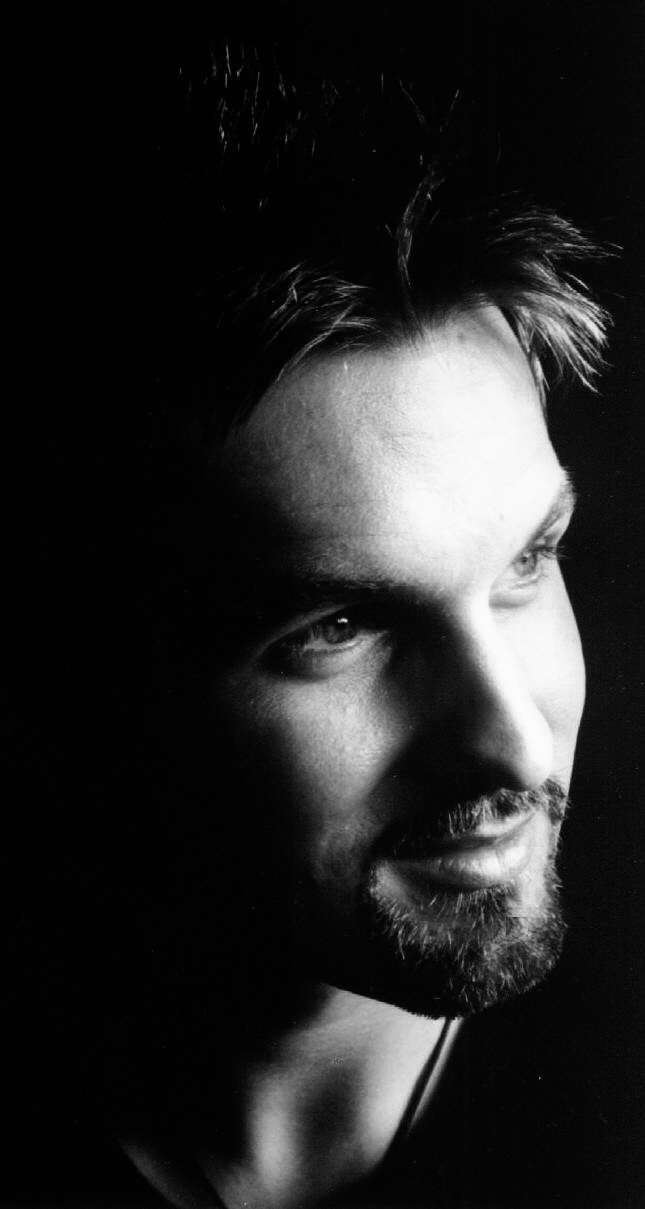
Marc Sylvan

Marc Sylvan is an English composer and sound designer.

His television credits include The Masked Singer, The Million Pound Drop, Pointless, Total Wipeout, Tipping Point, Catchphrase, All Together Now, Cannonball, Family Fortunes, Alesha's Street Dance Stars, The Bank Job, Golden Balls, 101 Ways to Leave a Gameshow, Divided, and Richard Osman's House of Games.

His work on the sci-fi short Embryo won Best Sound Design at the Vision Festival in 2005, which led to collaborations with Migraine Boy animator James Dean Conklin and Shrek animator Lee Lanier.

Sylvan has often worked with video game composer Richard Jacques on game releases including Sonic & Sega All-Stars Racing, The Club and Virtua Tennis. Other collaborations include working with former The Rakes guitarist Matthew Swinnerton under the name 'Buro'.

Sylvan's work is published by Faber Music and he is also a director and on the media executive of The Ivors Academy.
