= The Massacre at Paris =

Elizabethan play by Christopher Marlowe

The Massacre at Paris is an Elizabethan play by the English dramatist Christopher Marlowe (1593) and a Restoration drama by Nathaniel Lee (1689), the latter chiefly remembered for a song by Henry Purcell. Both concern the Saint Bartholomew's Day Massacre, which took place in Paris in 1572, and the part played by the Duc de Guise in those events.

== Marlowe's play ==
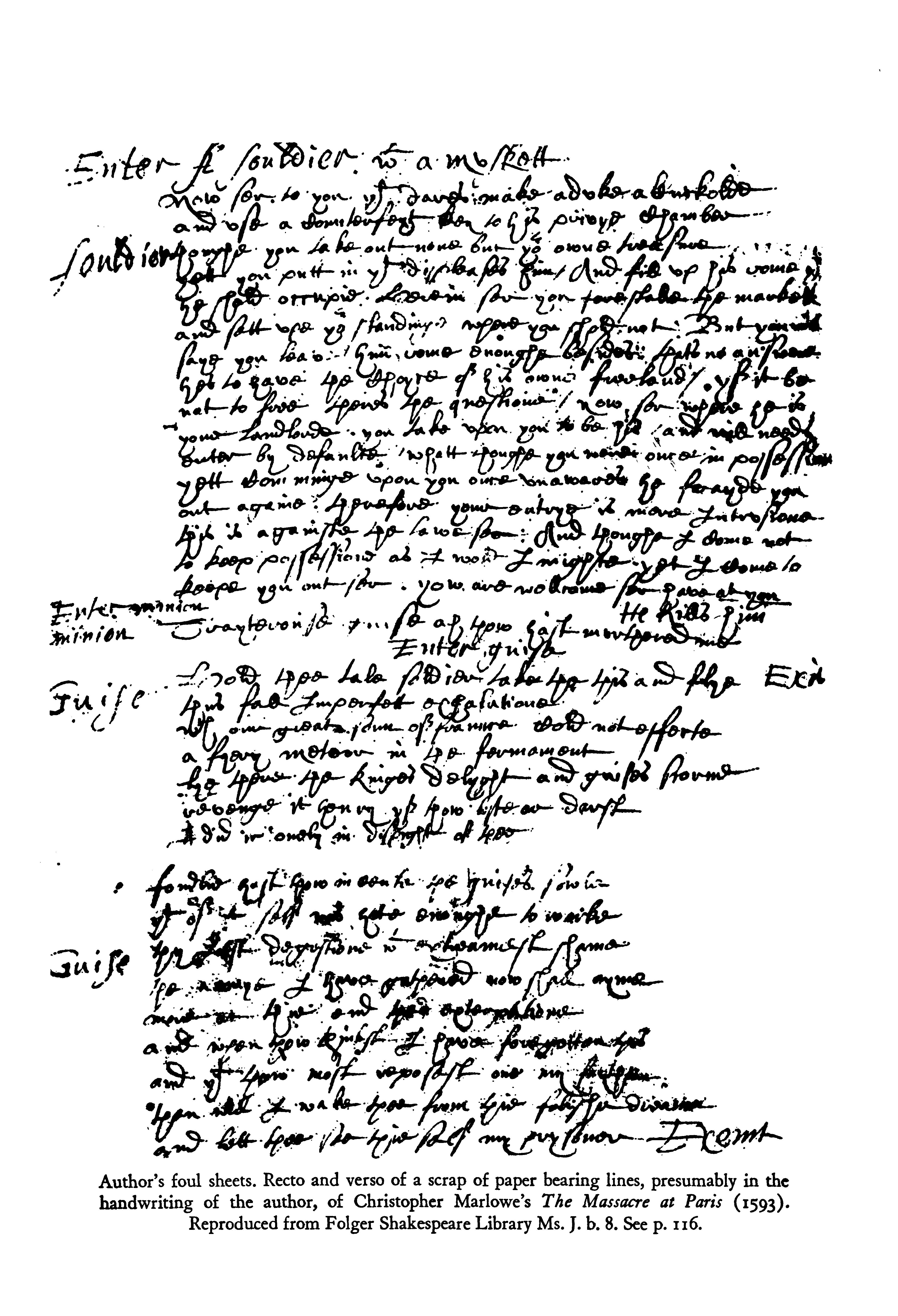
A foul sheet from Marlowe's writing of The Massacre at Paris (1593). Reproduced from Folger Shakespeare Library Ms.J.b.8

The Lord Strange's Men acted a play titled The Tragedy of the Guise, thought to be Marlowe's play, on 26 January 1593. The Diary of Philip Henslowe marks the play as "ne," though scholars disagree as to whether this indicates a "new" play or a performance at the Newington Butts theatre. The Admiral's Men performed The Guise or The Massacre ten times between 19 June and 25 September 1594. The Diary also indicates that Henslowe planned a revival of the play in 1602, possibly in a revised version. A possible revision may have something to do with the surprising number of Shakespearean borrowings and paraphrases in the text.

The only surviving text is an undated octavo edition, that at 1,250 or so lines seems too short to represent the complete original play and which has been conjectured to be a memorial reconstruction by the actors who performed the work.

One page perhaps survives in manuscript. It is known as the "Collier leaf," after the Shakespearean scholar John Payne Collier, who is known to have been a notorious forger, although modern scholars think that this particular leaf is probably authentic. It supplies a longer version of a speech of the Guise's than appears in the printed text, adding twelve lines of blank verse.

== Synopsis of Marlowe's play ==
The play begins in Paris, at the wedding of Henry of Navarre (a Huguenot noble) to Margaret of Valois (sister to the Catholic king). It is immediately clear that the Queen Mother, Catherine de Medici, has violent intentions towards Navarre, and the Huguenots have a deep distrust of the Catholics, who are under the leadership of the Duke of Guise (who quickly makes it clear he intends to murder the Queen of Navarre and one of her admirals).

Guise's plot is executed quickly, with the Queen of Navarre receiving poisoned gloves and her admiral being shot by a sniper as he helps carry the Queen of Navarre's body. The admiral does not die but is instead gravely injured. The royal family and the Guise faction leaders begin to plot a massacre while Charles, the King of France, visits the wounded admiral.

The admiral is soon murdered in his bed by Guise nobles, and the massacre spreads throughout Paris. Henry of Navarre is held inside the palace, the marriage between himself and the Catholic princess proving to have been useless in stemming an uprising.

The massacre, led by Guise and his close compatriots, calls for the blood of Huguenots, especially any Huguenots who have close ties to the Navarre line (including tutors and pastors). The massacre is considered successful, and the Queen Mother calls her son back from abroad to be crowned Henry III of France. He is welcomed and feted by his mother, who makes it clear to those in court that she is still the real power behind the throne and that she makes all the decisions.

Navarre is able to escape during this time and return to his home territory. He discovers Guise is raising an army to come after him, led by a general named Joyeux. Navarre immediately raises his own army and sends them to meet the French army before they reach his homeland. Navarre soon receives word that Joyeux has been killed and they have achieved a decisive victory against the French.

Guise is angered by his defeat, and Henry III is ready to be done with Guise entirely. Word of this plan reaches not only Guise, who begins to plan a counterattack, but also Navarre, who sends word to Henry III that he would like to join forces against the Guise. But before the two can combine their forces, Henry III convinces Guise to attend the royal court at Blois. There he has Guise murdered by three assassins and shows the body to Guise's son so that word of what has been done will get out to the people. He also orders the Duke's brothers Dumaine and the Cardinal of Lorraine murdered to reduce the risk of revenge. Henry informs his mother of what he has done, and she is saddened and angry that he has acted on his own without her. Dumaine learns of his brothers' murders, and a Jacobin friar offers to assassinate Henry III.

The two Kings of France and Navarre join forces against the Catholic League in Paris. Pretending to deliver a letter, the friar stabs Henry III, who kills the friar in the struggle. When it becomes clear that the King will not survive, he names Navarre as heir to the French throne. The play ends with Navarre, now Henry IV, vowing yet more revenge on the Catholic League.

== Adaptations of Marlowe's play ==
An adaptation of the play was broadcast on BBC Radio 3 on 30 May 1993, the 400th anniversary of Marlowe's death, along with Dido, Queen of Carthage, directed by Allen Drury and Michael Earley and featuring Timothy Walker as Anjou, Jeremy Blake as the Duke of Guise, Sally Dexter as Queen Catherine, Ben Thomas as Navarre, Teresa Gallagher as Margaret/Duchess of Guise and Andrew Wincott as Conde/Mugeroun/Son of Guise.

== Lee's play ==
Nathaniel Lee's play The Massacre of Paris was written during the 1680s when the author was in and out of Bedlam. The premiere took place in 1689.

Henry Purcell set the prophecy addressed to Charles IX from act V, "Thy genius, lo", in two versions, the one for baritone (Z 604a) appearing in Orpheus Britannicus. For a revival in 1695 he recast the speech as a recitative for treble.
