= Dido, Queen of Carthage (play) =

Play by Christopher Marlowe, published 1594

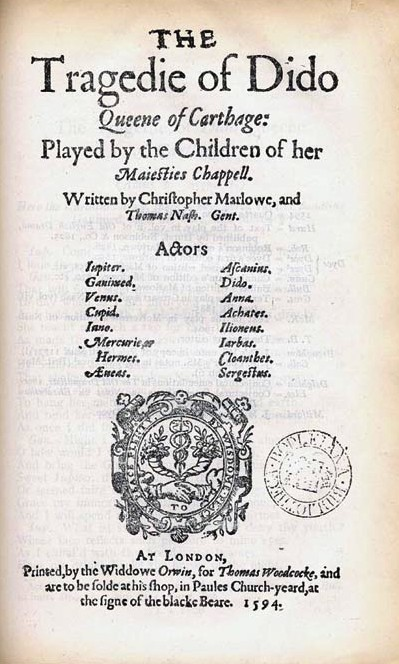
- Title page of the first edition of Dido, Queen of Carthage
- Original language: English
- Written by: Christopher Marlowe, Thomas Nashe
- Characters: Dido; Aeneas; Iarbas; Achates
- Subject: the story of Dido and Aeneas from the Aeneid.
- Genre: tragedy
- Setting: Carthage

Premiere
- Date: c. 1593
- Place: London

Dido, Queen of Carthage (full title: The Tragedie of Dido Queene of Carthage) is a short play written by the English playwright Christopher Marlowe, with possible contributions by Thomas Nashe. It was probably written between 1587 and 1593, and was first published in 1594. The story focuses on the classical figure of Dido, the Queen of Carthage. It tells an intense dramatic tale of Dido and her fanatical love for Aeneas (induced by Cupid), Aeneas' betrayal of her and her eventual suicide on his departure for Italy. The playwrights relied on Books 1, 2, and 4 of Virgil's Aeneid as primary source.

== Characters ==
- Dido – Queen of Carthage
- Aeneas – a Trojan royal hero, son of Anchises and the goddess Venus
- Ascanius – son of Aeneas
- Iarbas – King of Gaetulia who is in love with Dido
- Achates – friend of Aeneas
- Ilioneus – Greek Slave
- Cloanthus
- Sergestus – Commander of the Five armies
- Anna – Dido's sister
- Jupiter
- Ganymede
- Cupid
- Mercury
- Venus
- Juno
- A Lord
- A Nurse – Dido's widowed elderly nurse
- other Trojans and Carthaginians
- servants and attendants

== Sources ==
Dido is based on books 1, 2 and 4 of The Aeneid, but the author makes several deviations from this material. Pigman draws attention to how imitators 'exploit... the historical distance between a text and its model', leading to 'crucial departures from, sometimes criticisms of, the model'. Stump suggests that these changes in Dido, Queen of Carthage make a mockery of Aeneas. They notably include:

- Dido steals Aeneas's oars, preventing him from leaving.
- Aeneas dresses like a beggar, and is unrecognisable when he first arrives.
- Aeneas reacts violently to recollections of Troy, and is mad with grief over its loss.
- Aeneas is forced to beg Iarbus for help to get the supplies needed to leave Carthage.
- Anna and Iarbas commit suicide.

== Plot ==
Jupiter is fondling Ganymede, who says that Jupiter's wife Juno has been mistreating him because of her jealousy. Venus enters, and complains that Jupiter is neglecting his son Aeneas, who has left Troy with survivors of the defeated city. Aeneas was on his way to Italy, but is now lost in a storm. Jupiter tells her not to worry; he will quiet the storm. Venus travels to Libya, where she disguises herself as a mortal and meets Aeneas, who has arrived, lost, on the coast. He and a few followers have become separated from their comrades. He recognises her, but she denies her identity. She helps him meet up with Illioneus, Sergestus and Cloanthes, other surviving Trojans who have already received generous hospitality from the local ruler Dido, Queen of Carthage. Dido meets Aeneas and promises to supply his ships. She asks him to give her the true story of the fall of Troy, which he does in detail, describing the death of Priam, the loss of his own wife and his escape with his son Ascanius and other survivors.

Dido's suitor, Iarbas, presses her to agree to marry him. She seems to favour him, but Venus has other plans. She disguises Cupid as Aeneas's son Ascanius, so that he can get close to Dido and touch her with his arrow. He does so; Dido immediately falls in love with Aeneas and rejects Iarbas out of hand, to his horror and confusion. Dido's sister Anna, who is in love with Iarbas, encourages Dido to pursue Aeneas. Dido and Aeneas meet at a cave, where Dido declares her love. They enter the cave to have sex. Iarbas swears he will get revenge. Venus and Juno appear, arguing over Aeneas. Venus believes that Juno wants to harm her son, but Juno denies it, saying she has important plans for him.

Aeneas's followers say they must leave Libya, to fulfil their destiny in Italy. Aeneas seems to agree, and prepares to depart. Dido sends Anna to find out what is happening. She brings Aeneas back, who denies he intended to leave. Dido forgives him, but as a precaution removes all the sails and tackle from his ships. She also places Ascanius in the custody of the Nurse, believing that Aeneas will not leave without him. However, "Ascanius" is really the disguised Cupid. Dido says that Aeneas will be king of Carthage and anyone who objects will be executed. Aeneas agrees and plans to build a new city to rival Troy and strike back at the Greeks.

Mercury appears with the real Ascanius (a.k.a. Cupid) and informs Aeneas that his destiny is in Italy and that he must leave on the orders of Jupiter. Aeneas reluctantly accepts the divine command. Iarbas sees the opportunity to be rid of his rival and agrees to supply Aeneas with the missing tackle. Aeneas tells Dido he must leave. She pleads with him to ignore Jupiter's command, but he refuses to do so. He departs, leaving Dido in despair. The Nurse says that "Ascanius" has disappeared. Dido orders her to be imprisoned. She tells Iarbas and Anna that she intends to make a funeral pyre on which she will burn everything that reminds her of Aeneas. After cursing Aeneas' progeny, she throws herself into the fire. Iarbas, horrified, kills himself too. Anna, seeing Iarbas dead, kills herself.

== Publication ==
The play was first published in 1594, a year after Marlowe's untimely death in Deptford, by the widow Orwin for the bookseller Thomas Woodcock, in Paul's Churchyard. The title page attributes the play to Marlowe and Nashe, and also states that the play was acted by the Children of the Chapel. That company of boy actors stopped regular dramatic performance in 1584, but appears to have engaged in at least sporadic performances in the late 1580s and early 1590s, so that scholars give a range of 1587–93 for the first performance of Dido.

== Authorship ==
The nineteenth-century scholar Frederick Gard Fleay attempted to delineate the collaborators' respective shares in the text, and assigned to Nashe these portions – Act I, scene i (second part, after line 122); Act III, scenes i, ii, and iv; Act IV, scenes i, ii, and v; – and the rest to Marlowe.

However, subsequent critics have not concurred in this assessment, most notably the investigations of Knutowski, R.B. McKerrow, and Tucker Brooke found very little that they felt could be credited to Nashe. While Frederick S. Boas admitted a few details had parallels in Nashe's published works and some words or meanings are found in Nashe's works but not otherwise used by Marlowe, "the scenes in which these passages and phrases appear have, as a whole, the stamp of Marlowe." Some critics have virtually ignored the participation of Nashe – yet the presence of a collaborator may help to explain the play's divergences from Marlowe's standard dramaturgy. No other play by Marlowe has such a strong female lead character, and in no other "is heteroerotic passion the centripetal force of the drama's momentum."

However, more recent studies conducted independently by Darren Freebury-Jones and Marcus Dahl, and Ruth Lunney and Hugh Craig, have failed to uncover evidence for Nashe's participation.

== Adaptations ==
The 18th-century English composer Stephen Storace wrote an opera titled Dido, Queen of Carthage (1794) – alleged, by his sister Anna (Nancy) Storace, for whom the title role was written, to have been his greatest work – which largely set Marlowe's play to music. It was also the only one of Storace's works to have been completely sung throughout, with no spoken dialogue. However, the work was never published, as Storace's impresario Richard Brinsley Sheridan wished to retain control over productions of it. A single copy was kept at the Drury Lane Theatre, to prevent pirated versions appearing elsewhere – and the opera is presumed to have been lost in the 1809 Drury Lane Theatre fire, since nothing of it has survived.

An adaptation of the play was broadcast on BBC Radio 3 on 30 May 1993, the 400th anniversary of Marlowe's death, along with The Massacre at Paris, directed by Allen Drury and Michael Earley and featuring Sally Dexter as Dido, Timothy Walker as Aeneas, Jeremy Blake as Iarbas, Ben Thomas as Achates, Teresa Gallagher as Anna/Juno and Andrew Wincott as Cupid.

The play was recorded live as part of the Beyond Shakespeare Winter Revels on Tuesday 12th December 2023, with the final edited full cast audio adaptation made available online in 2026.
