= Hero and Leander (poem) =

Poem by Christopher Marlowe

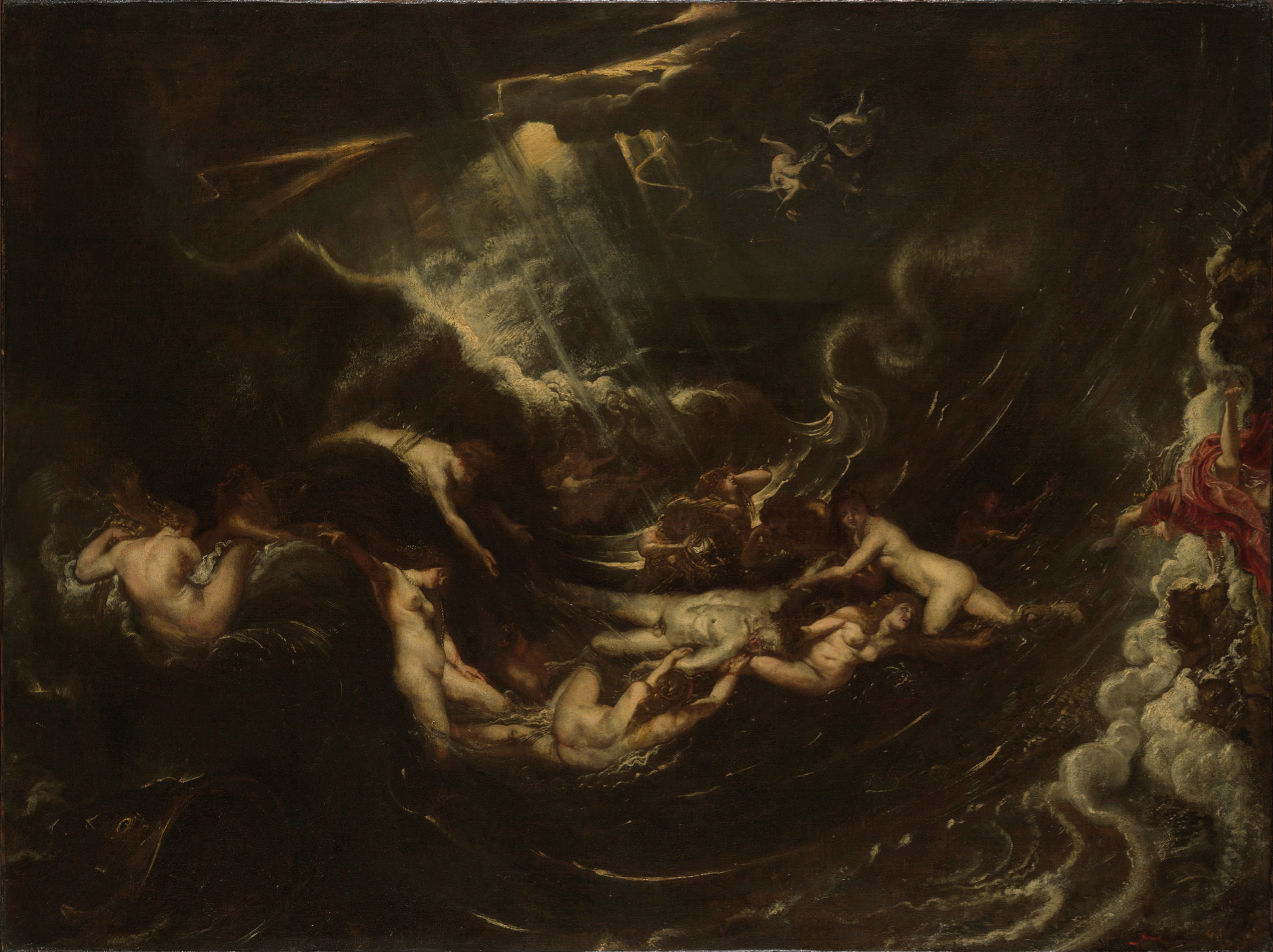
Hero and Leander by Peter Paul Rubens, c. 1604

Hero and Leander is a poem by Christopher Marlowe that retells the Greek myth of Hero and Leander. After Marlowe's untimely death, it was completed by George Chapman. The minor poet Henry Petowe published an alternative completion to the poem. The poem was first published five years after Marlowe's demise.

== Publication ==
Two editions of the poem were issued in quarto in 1598 (see 1598 in poetry); one, printed by Adam Islip for the bookseller Edward Blount, contained only Marlowe's original, while the other, printed by Felix Kingston for Paul Linley, included both the original and Chapman's continuation. A third edition in 1600, published by John Flasket, printed a title-page advertising the addition of Marlowe's translation of Book I of Lucan's Pharsalia to the original poem, though the book itself merely adds Chapman's portion. The fourth edition of 1606, again from Flasket, abandoned any pretence of including the Lucan and once again joined Marlowe's and Chapman's poems together; this was the format followed in subsequent 17th-century editions (1609, 1613, 1629, 1637 and after).

== Story ==
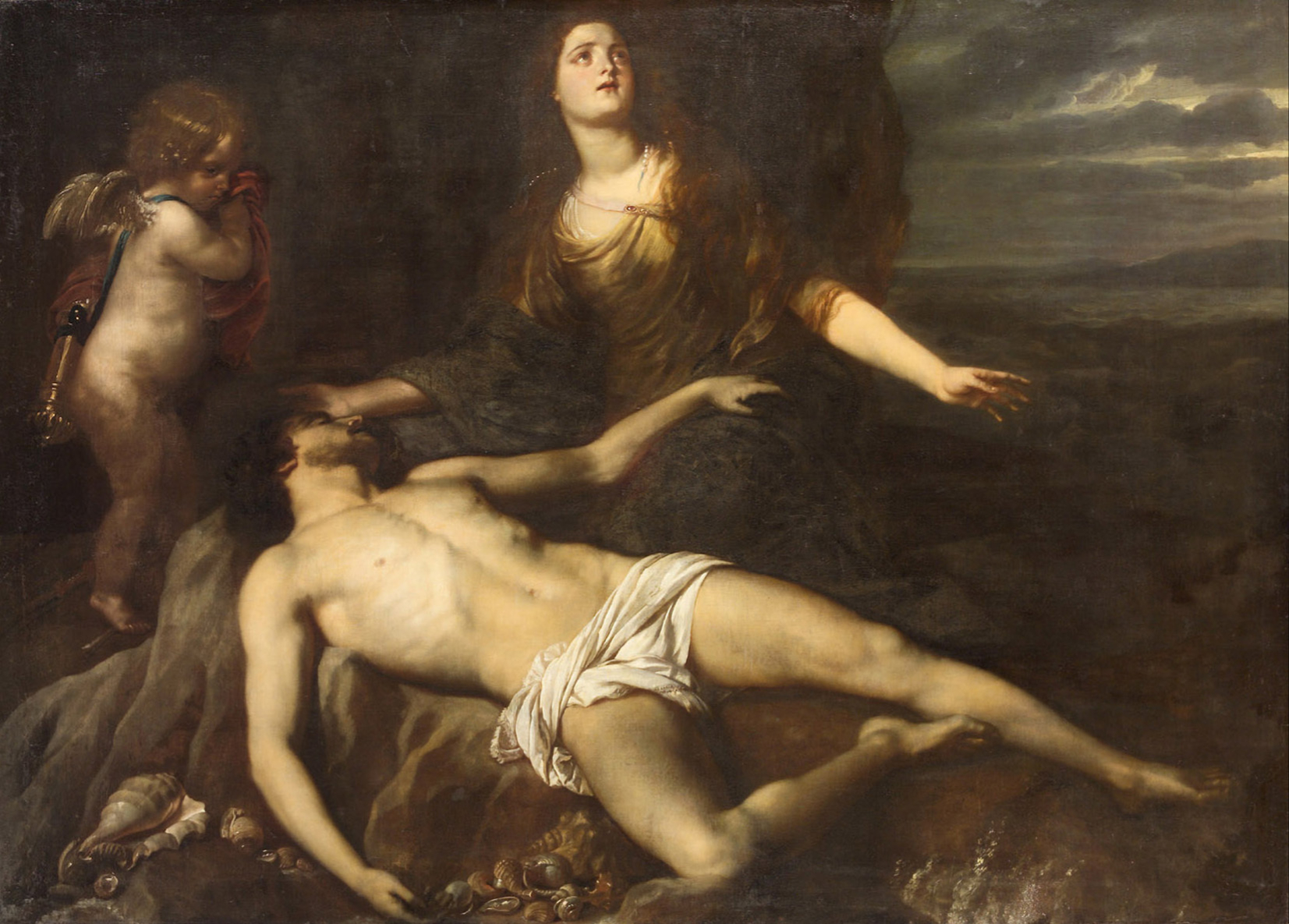
Hero laments the dead Leander by Jan van den Hoecke, c. 1637

Marlowe's poem relates the Greek legend of Hero and Leander, young lovers living in cities on opposite sides of the Hellespont, a narrow stretch of the sea in what is now northwestern Turkey, and which separates Europe and Asia. Hero is a priestess or devotee of Venus (goddess of love and beauty) in Sestos, who lives in chastity despite being devoted to the goddess of love. At a festival in honour of her deity, Venus and Adonis, she is seen by Leander, a youth from Abydos on the opposite side of the Hellespont. Leander falls in love with her, and she reciprocates, although cautiously, as she has made a vow of chastity to Venus.

Leander convinces her to abandon her fears. Hero lives in a high tower overlooking the water; he asks her to light a lamp in her window, and he promises to swim the Hellespont each night to be with her. She complies. On his first night's swim, Leander is spotted by Neptune (Roman god of the sea), who confuses him with Ganymede and carries him to the bottom of the ocean. Discovering his mistake, the god returns him to shore with a bracelet supposed to keep him safe from drowning. Leander emerges from the Hellespont, finds Hero's tower and knocks on the door, which Hero then opens to find him standing stark naked. She lets him "whisper in her ear, / Flatter, entreat, promise, protest, and swear," and after a series of coy, half-hearted attempts to "defend the fort" she yields to bliss. The poem breaks off as dawn is breaking.

No critical consensus exists on the issue of how Marlowe, had he lived, would have finished the poem, or indeed if he would have finished it at all.

== Genre, source, and style ==
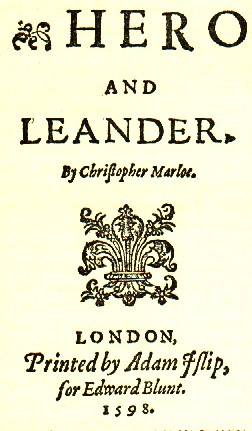
Title page from one of the 1598 quartos

The poem may be called an epyllion, that is, a "little epic": it is longer than a lyric or elegy, but concerned with love rather than with traditional epic subjects, and it has a lengthy digression – in this case, Marlowe's invented story of how scholars became poor. Marlowe certainly knew the story as told by both Ovid and by the Byzantine poet Musæus Grammaticus; Musæus appears to have been his chief source.

Yet if Musaeus and Ovid gave it impetus, the poem is marked by Marlowe's unique style of extravagant fancy and violent emotion. Perhaps the most famous instance of these qualities in the poem is the opening description of Hero's costume, which includes a blue skirt stained with the blood of "wretched lovers slain" and a veil woven with flowers so realistic that she is continually forced to swat away bees. The final encounter of the two lovers is even more frenzied, with the two at times appearing closer to blows than to embraces.

== Adaptation ==
In Bartholomew Fair, Ben Jonson lampoons the poem in the fair's puppet show; his Hellespont is the River Thames, and his Leander is a dyer's son in Puddle-wharf. A poem based to some extent on Marlowe's text was set to music around 1628 by the composer Nicholas Lanier; this may have been one of the earliest works in recitative in English. King Charles I was fond of the work, and had Lanier perform it repeatedly; Samuel Pepys also admired it, and had it transcribed by his "domestic musician", Cesare Morelli. Hero and Leander is also the only identifiable work of a contemporary writer quoted in any of the plays of William Shakespeare, specifically in As You Like It.
