= Foul papers =

Specialist term for an author's working drafts

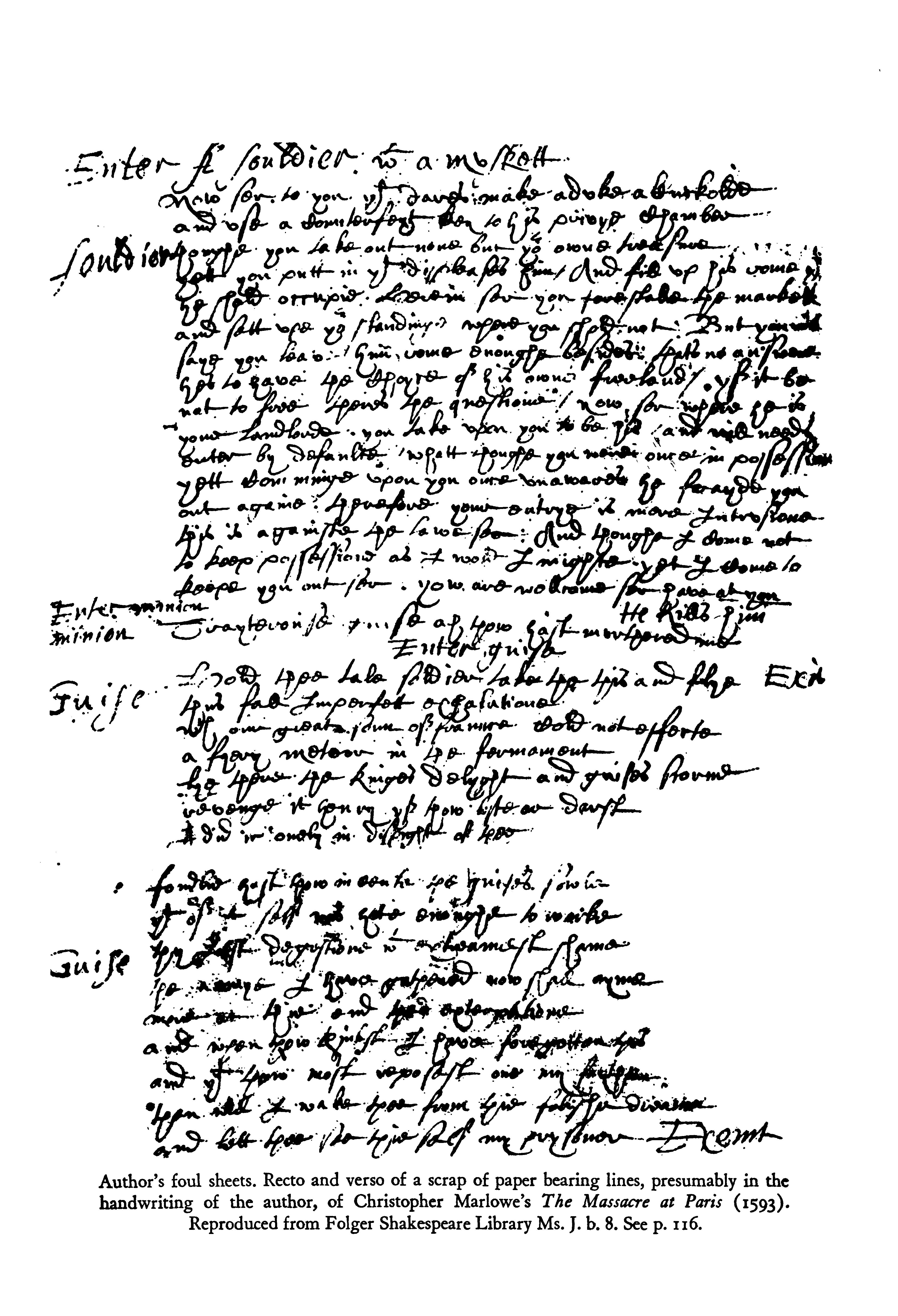
A sheet of what some consider to be Christopher Marlowe's foul papers. It contains lines from his play The Massacre at Paris (1593). Reproduced from Folger Shakespeare Library Ms.J.b.8

Foul papers are an author's working drafts. The term is most often used in the study of the plays of Shakespeare and other dramatists of English Renaissance drama. Once the composition of a play was finished, a transcript or "fair copy" of the foul papers was prepared, by the author or by a scribe.

The term "foul papers" is given different definitions by various scholars. For example, some define them as "the author's original drafts". W. W. Greg and Fredson Bowers define them as "the author's last complete draft, in a shape satisfactory to him for transfer to a fair copy". E. A. J. Honigmann defines them as "any kind of draft preceding the first fair copy". Paul Werstine states that foul papers "need not refer exclusively to authorial drafts", and that the term "simply describes papers that are to be, are being, or have already been transcribed", and that foul papers may once have been fair copies.

Few sets of foul papers actually exist from the era in question. Of the relatively small number of dramas that are extant in manuscript, the majority are from the Caroline and Cromwellian era (1625–1660) rather than the Elizabethan and Jacobean era (1558–1625), and most are fair copies of plays by professional scribes like Ralph Crane.

In a rare direct reference to foul papers and fair copies, Robert Daborne mentions both in a November 1613 letter to theatrical manager Philip Henslowe: "I send you the foul sheet and the fair I was writing", which appears to indicate that Daborne prepared a fair copy of his working drafts as he wrote.

== Notes ==
=== Sources ===
- Chambers, Edmund Kerchever (1923). The Elizabethan Stage (4 volumes). Oxford: Clarendon Press.
- Halliday, Frank Ernest (1964). A Shakespeare Companion 1564–1964. Baltimore: Penguin.
