= Forget Me Not (2019 film) =

2019 British short film

- Forget Met Not
- Directed by: Nicholas Goulden
- Written by: Nicolas Goulden & Angela Godfrey
- Produced by: Angela Godfrey
- Starring: James Cosmo John Heffernan Ruby Royle
- Cinematography: Chris Fergusson
- Edited by: Marco Ruffatti
- Music by: Matthew Slater
- Production company: Keen City
- Distributed by: Filmhub
- Release dates: March 2019 (CPH:DOX); 1 December 2020
- Country: United Kingdom
- Language: English

Forget Me Not is a 2019 short film starring James Cosmo, John Heffernan and Ruby Royle, directed by Nicholas Goulden and produced by Angela Godfrey, both of whom wrote the screenplay. It tells the story of Isobel, a young girl who forms an unlikely alliance with a lonely homeless man as she struggles to get a message to her family in time for Christmas. The film was shot in Hammersmith, London, and the score was recorded at Abbey Road Studios. It won a number of international awards including Best Drama at Portobello Film Festival, and The Dam Short Film Festival and Best Short Film and The Special Prize at Zero Plus International Film Festival. The film's television debut was on London Live and it is now available on a number of online platforms including Amazon Prime Video.

Forget Me Not was crowdfunded on Kickstarter.

== Plot ==
Isobel, a silent young girl, is lost and alone on the streets of London. She looks like she wants help, but no-one notices her.

It is six days until Christmas. Isobel intently watches a world-weary commuter, Jack, as he speaks to his troubled young son on the phone. She seems to share his concerns and follows him.

Jack walks to Benedict, an older homeless man, giving him a coffee as part of his daily ritual. Benedict stares vacantly and barely responds, but Jack accepts this as normal and continues on his way. Isobel stops to look at Benedict, empathising with his plight.

Wandering the streets, increasingly hopeless, she that night comes across him again and, despite her own situation, she feels sad for him and stops to look. To her amazement, Benedict looks up and stares right at her. He is the only person who can see her and is, she realises, her only hope.

In an effort to communicate with Benedict, Isobel gives him her teddy bear as he sleeps. But next morning, the bear has disappeared. Benedict thinks little of it, assuming he was dreaming. The same thing happens over the next several days as Isobel tries - and fails - to communicate with Benedict, succeeding only in frustrating him.

As the days go by, Isobel's hope diminishes until, two nights before Christmas, Benedict becomes angry and yells at her to leave him alone. Terrified and distraught, Isobel runs away.

On Christmas Eve, straying from his usual spot after Jack gives him cash to buy a coffee, Benedict sees a photograph of Isobel nestled among old bouquets of flowers that mark the site of a fatal traffic accident. The penny drops.

That night, finally realising that Isobel needs his help, not the other way around, Benedict finds her and apologises. She offers him her bear and, looking at it in a new light, he now notices that sown into the label is the name and address of Owen, Isobel's brother. He promises to get the bear to Owen in time for Christmas. Content at last that her message will be passed on, she hugs Benedict and disappears, leaving her balloon to ascend into the night sky.

With renewed purpose, Benedict goes to Isobel's house. He is greeted by Owen, a four-year-old full of beans, who runs off for his parents. He returns with his father, a very surprised Jack. When Benedict gives the bear to Owen, he learns that Owen blames himself for Isobel's death because she was hit by a car after running to pick up Owen's bear which he had dropped – and Isobel is trying to tell him that she is ok.

As Benedict turns to leave, Jack, struggling to come to terms with what has just happened, invites Benedict in.

As the credits start to roll, a young man carrying a sports bag arrives at Benedict's now empty spot and starts to settle in. Even on Christmas Morning, the cycle of homelessness continues.

== Cast ==
- James Cosmo as Benedict
- John Heffernan as Jack
- Ruby Royle as Isobel
- Louis Brodie as Owen
- Anton Romaine Thompson as Barista
- Ricardo Freitas as Drunk Homeless Man
- Tom Patrick Coley as Young Homeless Man

== Reception ==
=== Critical response ===
UK Film Review called it a "devastatingly moving story" and ranked it in the Top 20 films of 2019. Critical Popcorn said it was "an unforgettable, heartwarming story". Flix Chatter described it as "such a beautiful film" and Candid Magazine said it "will fill you with tears of joy".

=== Awards and nominations ===
Ceremonies	Year(s)	Categories	Recipients/nominees	Results	Ref
The Dam Short Film Festival	2021	Best Drama	Forget Me Not	Won	
Portobello Film Festival	2020	Best Drama	Forget Me Not	Won	
Zero Plus Film Festival	2020	Jury Prize - Best International Short Special Prize - Best International Short Film	Forget Me Not	Won Won	
BAFTA	2020	Best British Short Film	Forget Me Not	Longlisted	
Foyle Film Festival	2019	Light In Motion Award for Best Drama	Forget Me Not	Finalist	
British Independent Film Festival	2020	Best British Short Film	Forget Me Not	Finalist	
Norwich Film Festival	2019	Best Film	Forget Me Not	Nominated	
Southampton Film Festival	2021	Best Short Film Best Lead Actor Best Supporting Actress Best Production Design	Forget Me Not James Cosmo Ruby Royle Forget Me Not	Pending	
L.I.M.P.A London Film Festival	2020	Best Director Best Composer	Nicholas Gouden Matthew Slater	Finalist Finalist	
Alicante Film Festival	2020	Best Film	Forget Me Not	Nominated	
New Haven Film Festival	2021	Best Film	Forget Me Not	Nominated	
Madrid Independent Film Festival	2020	Best Film	Forget Me Not	Nominated	
Cinemagic Film Festival	2020	Best Film	Forget Me Not	Nominated	
Picknic Film Festival	2020	Best Fiction Short Film	Forget Me Not	Nominated	
Ciudad De La Linea Film Festival	2021	Best Film	Forget Me Not	Nominated	
