= Lee Lanier =

Lee Lanier is an American 3D computer animator and the author of nine books for the 3D modeling software package Maya and the digital compositing software packages After Effects, Fusion, and Nuke. He served as an instructor for animation for the Academy of Art University and Gnomon School of Visual Effects. He has recorded visual effects video tutorials for lynda.com and The Foundry.

After working for Buena Vista Visual Effects at Walt Disney Studios in Los Angeles, Lanier worked at PDI/DreamWorks in the San Francisco bay area—where he served as modeler and lighter for the movies Shrek and Antz. Next, he moved to Boulder City, Nevada where Lee formed his own company, BeezleBug Bit LLC.

Lanier's computer-animated short films have played at over 200 film festivals, galleries, and museums worldwide. Millennium Bug won the Mike Gribble Peel of Laughter Award at the 1998 Ottawa International Animation Festival and the Silver Jury Award at the 1999 Chicago Underground Film Festival.

Lanier's short films Day Off the Dead, Mirror, Millennium Bug, 13 Ways to Die at Home, Blood Roulette, and South Seas Dream have played such venues as the Sundance Film Festival, the Ottawa International Animation Festival, and Cinequest Film Festival. Lee is also the co-founder of and director of continuity for The Dam Short Film Festival. Starting in 2015, Lanier began to pursue painting and has since shown his artwork in galleries in eight states.
