= John Heffernan (British actor) =

British theatre and screen actor

- Born: 30 June 1981 (age 45); Billericay, Essex, England
- Occupation: Actor
- Years active: 2006–present

John Heffernan (born 30 June 1981) is a British actor. He has worked with the English Touring Theatre, the Royal Shakespeare Company (RSC), and the National Theatre, taking the lead roles in Edward II at the National Theatre, and Oppenheimer with the RSC.

== Early life ==
He attended the Anglo European School in Ingatestone. Aged 14 he completed the BBC Press Pack Masterclass course.

== Career ==
Heffernan was born in Billericay, Essex, England and worked as an usher at the National Theatre. He has appeared on screen in a number of roles, including Henry Lascelles in the BBC adaptation of Susanna Clarke's novel Jonathan Strange & Mr Norrell, Jaggers in Dickensian and Steven Rose in the fourth series of Luther. In 2017, he played John Grigg, 2nd Baron Altrincham, in an episode of the Netflix series The Crown. He also played the Nine for Big Finish, in their Doctor Who box sets Doom Coalition and Ravenous. He returned to the National Theatre in 2022 to play the co-lead opposite Katherine Parkinson in a new production of Much Ado About Nothing directed by Simon Godwin.

== Filmography ==
=== Film ===
Years	Title	Role	Notes
2013	Having You	Dr. Matthew Jenson	
2015	Eye in the Sky	Major Howard Webb	
2017	Crooked House	Laurence Brown	
2019	Official Secrets	James Welch	
2019	Forget Me Not	Jack	
2020	Misbehaviour	Gareth Stedman Jones	
2020	The Banishing	Linus Foster	
2020	The Duke	Neddie Cussen	

=== Television ===
Years	Title	Role	Notes
2008	King Lear	Oswald	Television film
2012	The Hollow Crown	Francis	2 episodes
2013	Murder on the Home Front	Wilfred Zeigler	Episode: "Part 1"
2013	Love and Marriage	Ashley Roehampton	6 episodes
2014	Outlander	Brigadier General Lord Thomas	Episode: "The Garrison Commander"
2014	Ripper Street	Ronald Capshaw	2 episodes
2015	Sons of Liberty	Governor's Aide	3 episodes
2015	Foyle's War	James Griffin	Episode: "Trespass"
2015	Jonathan Strange & Mr. Norrell	Henry Lascelles	7 episodes
2015	Luther	Steven Rose	2 episodes
2015–16	Dickensian	Jaggers	13 episodes
2017	The Loch	Dr. Simon Marr	6 episodes
2017	The Crown	Lord Altrincham	Episode: "Marionettes"
2018	Collateral	Sam Spence	4 episodes
2019	Brexit: The Uncivil War	Matthew Elliott	Television film
2020	Dracula	Jonathan Harker	Television mini-series
2021	The Pursuit of Love	Davey	3 episodes
2022	Becoming Elizabeth	Duke of Somerset	8 episodes
2023	A Ghost Story for Christmas	The Friend	Episode: "Lot No. 249"
2024	A Gentleman in Moscow	"The Bishop" Leplevsky	8 episodes
2024	This Town	Commander Bentley	5 episodes
TBA	Tomb Raider	David	Filming

=== Video games ===
Years	Title	Role
2007	Manhunt 2	Watchdog Gang Member
2015	Final Fantasy XIV: Heavensward	Nero
2019	Final Fantasy XIV: Shadowbringers	Nero
2021	Final Fantasy XIV: Endwalker	Barnier, Sir, M-017
2022	Expeditions: Rome	Tricky Praetorian, Vitellius Legionary, Roman Soldier Male, Roman Civilian Rich Male
2023	Final Fantasy XVI	Tyler
