= Abigail Rokison =

Shakespearean scholar

Abigail Rokison-Woodall (née Rokison) is an author and academic specialising in William Shakespeare, as well as a former actress. She was Director of Studies in English and Drama at Homerton College, Cambridge, until the end of 2012. She is now Professor of Shakespeare and Theatre at the Shakespeare Institute, Stratford-upon-Avon. She previously played Primrose in The Darling Buds of May.

== Biography ==
Her acting career covered both stage and screen, and included the role of Primrose Larkin in the ITV television comedy drama The Darling Buds of May, first broadcast between 1991 and 1993. She went on to earn a Diploma in Acting from the London Academy of Music and Dramatic Art in 1996, followed by an undergraduate degree in Humanities with Literature from The Open University in 2001. Using the proceeds from a recent re-run of the Darling Buds series, Rokison was then able to earn a 2002 Master's degree in Shakespearean studies from the joint programme between King's College London and the Globe Theatre. From there, she earned a PhD degree from Trinity Hall, Cambridge, in 2007. Her thesis is described as a "new synthesis of academic and theatrical approaches to the Shakespearean text". Following her doctorate, she remained in academia as Director of Studies in English and Drama at Homerton College, Cambridge, having joined the staff in 2006. Having been published by the Cambridge University Press in January 2010 as a hardback, her dissertation went on to receive the inaugural Shakespeare's Globe Book Award in 2012, awarded to works that have made an "important contribution to the understanding of Shakespeare's theatre, or his contemporaries". In 2013, she published her second book, Shakespeare for Young People (Bloomsbury).

Rokison married actor Andrew Woodall in 2015. They have a son, Sebastian Rokison-Woodall, born in 2016. Rokison has three step-children: Constance, Gabriel and Leo Woodall.

== Bibliography ==
Books

- Shakespearean Verse Speaking, 2010, Cambridge University Press. ISBN 9780521764346
- Shakespeare's for Young People: Productions, Versions and Adaptations, 2013, Arden/ Bloomsbury. ISBN 9781441125569
- Shakespeare in the Theatre: Nicholas Hytner
- As You Like It: Language and Writing
- Arden Performance Editions: Hamlet, A Midsummer Night's Dream, King Lear and Richard III
- Shakespeare and Lecoq (with Ed Woodall)

Book chapters

- "Shakespeare's Dramatic Line" in The Oxford Handbook to Shakespeare's Poetry, ed. Jonathan Post (Oxford: OUP, 2013)
- "Henry V" in Shakespeare Beyond English, ed. Christie Carson and Susan Bennett (Cambridge: CUP, 2013)
- "Laurence Olivier" in Great Shakespeareans: Gielgud, Olivier, Ashcroft, Dench, ed. Russell Jackson (London: Bloomsbury, 2013)
- "Authenticity in the 21st Century: Propeller and Shakespeare's Globe" in Shakespeare in Stages, ed. Christie Carson and Chris Dymokowski (Cambridge: CUP, 2010)

Journal articles

- "Shakespeare in Performance" at the Second Biennial British Shakespeare Association Conference. 2005. Shakespeare (Routledge)
- "The RSC Histories Cycle: Actor and Audience Perspectives". 2008. Shakespeare (Routledge)
- "Romeo and Juliet for the young viewer". 2009. The New Review of Children's Literature and Librarianship (Routledge)
- "David Tennant: Playing Hamlet" (interview). 2009. Shakespeare (Routledge)
- "Our scene is alter'd: Versions and adaptations of Hamlet for young people". 2010. Literature Compass

== Notes ==
=== Sources ===
- Rokison, Abigail (January 2010). Shakespearean Verse Speaking: Text and Theatre Practice. Cambridge: University of Cambridge Press.
