= The Dam Short Film Festival =

Short film festival in the USA

The Dam Short Film Festival is a film festival held annually in Boulder City, Nevada, typically in early February. Lee Lanier and Anita Lanier are the original co-founders of the festival. The festival is organized by the Dam Short Film Society, a non-profit 501(c)3 Nevada corporation. Past festival sponsors have included The Art Institutes, the Nevada Film Office, the Hacienda Hotel and Casino, and Cirque du Soleil. The Society receives annual grants from the National Endowment for the Arts via the Nevada Arts Council.

Started in 2005, the Dam Short Film Festival only screens films that run between 1 and 40 minutes. Generally, there are between 100 and 140 short films programmed each year. Although most of the festival shorts are submitted by student, independent, and other "up-and-coming" filmmakers, the stiff competition means many of the shorts have been produced involving film professionals. These have included Oscar-winner Louis Gossett Jr. in "Window," Oscar-winner, Tom Hanks, William Shatner, and Michael York in "Why Shakespeare?", the late Bela Lugosi narrating an animation based on the Edgar Allan Poe classic "The Tell-Tale Heart", Francesco Quinn in "The Gnostic", and Robert Wagner and Lori Singer in "Little Victim " The short films are arranged into thematic programs, such as international drama, crime drama, dramedy, science-fiction, horror, comedy, avant-garde, underground, and animation. In addition to the regular screenings, the festival presents special showcases and retrospectives; for example, the 2009 event featured a showcase dedicated to documentary filmmaker Jay Rosenblatt while 2008 included a program dedicated to animator Jim Blashfield The festival also presents parties, mixers, filmmaker panels, and Q&A sessions with attending filmmakers.

In 2008, the Festival moved to the historic 400-seat Boulder Theatre. The Theatre was built in 1931 and is currently owned by Desi Arnaz Jr. and his wife Amy. 2014 marked the 10th anniversary of the festival. At present, Lee Lanier serves as the Dam Short Film Society's executive director while John LaBonney serves as festival director. The Society has a working board of directors that varies from 4 to 6 members.
