= Robert Skerne =

Member of the Parliament of England

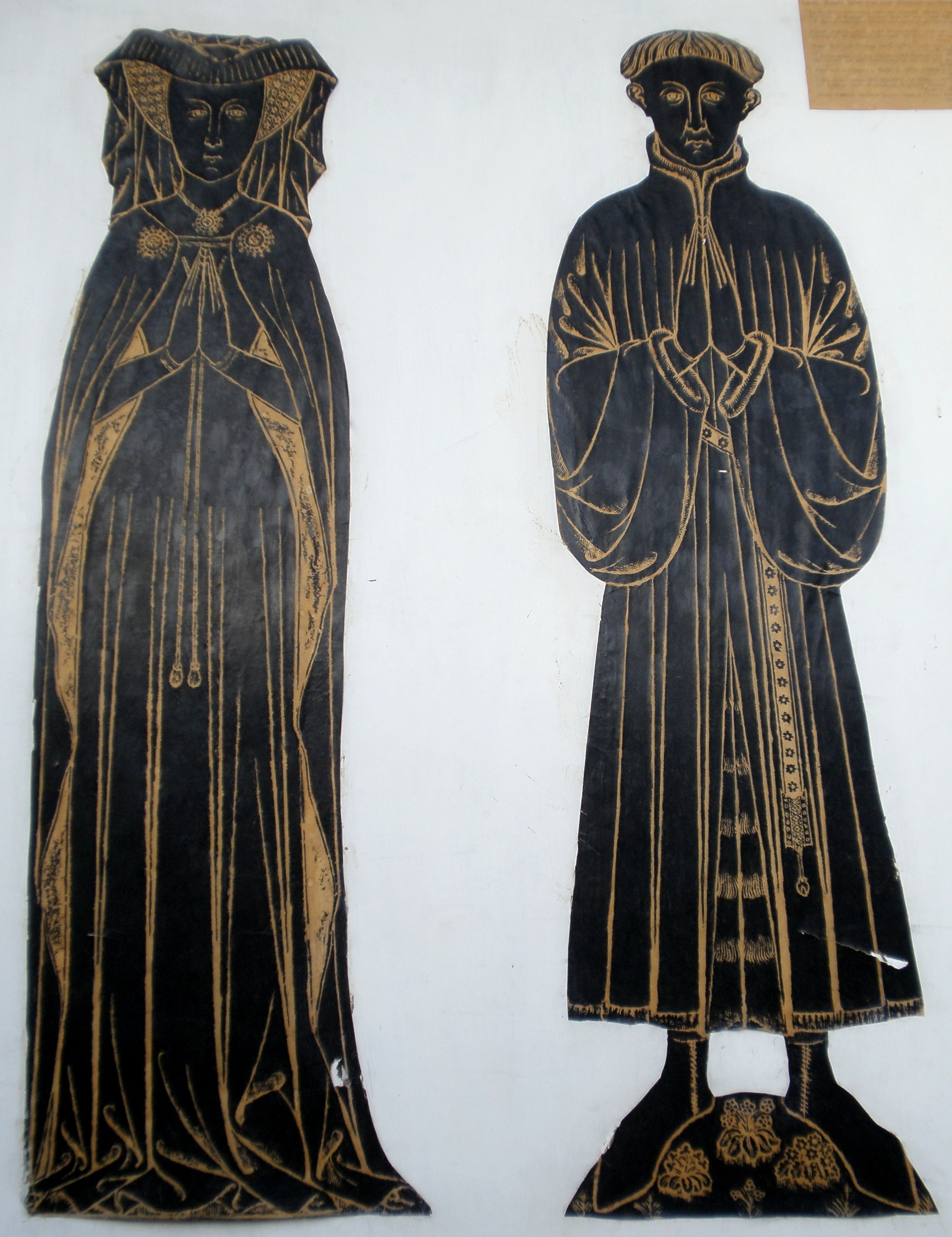
- Joan and Robert Skerne

Member of Parliament for Surrey
- In office 1420 – May 1421
- In office 1422–1423

Personal details
- Died: 9 April 1437 Kingston upon Thames
- Resting place: All Saints Church, Kingston upon Thames; 51.4104°N 0.3061°W
- Spouse: Joan
- Profession: lawyer

Robert Skerne (died 1437) was MP for Surrey in 1420 and again in 1422.

== Career ==
There is difficulty in determining if the MP and a Robert Skerne of Yorkshire who served as royal clerk to both Richard II and Henry IV were the same individual. A Robert Skerne stood surety in Chancery for his friends during the two reigns. There are grounds to assume that the records relate to the same person.

The earliest record of Skerne's career come from 1389 when he was rewarded by the crown with the keepership of St. Ellen’s hospital (Bracefordspittle) in Yorkshire and the farm of the manor of Willoughton in Lincolnshire which he was still paying rent for in November 1420. Skerne was appointed commissioner to audit the accounts of persons collecting pavage in London in October 1406. He was appointed Commissioner of Sewers in Surrey in December 1417. Skerne was a J.P. in Surrey from 28 October 1417, a post he held for fourteen years. He was made commissioner to raise a royal loan in November 1419 and was tax collector for Surrey in January 1420. That same year he became MP for Surrey in the 9th parliament of Henry V. His judicial career continued, being appointed commissioner of oyer and terminer in July 1421. Skerne was MP for Surrey again in 1422 in the first Parliament of Henry VI. In April 1431 he was commissioner to assess a royal loan and, in December that year, he retired as JP.

== Marriage and property ==
Skerne is noted for having married Joan, youngest daughter of Alice Perrers, mistress of Edward III, which implies that Skerne had connections at court. Joan profited little from her mother's estate following Perrers' death in 1400/1401 but acquired the manor of Compton Murdak in Warwickshire. Joan fought a series of sometimes protracted legal battles to support her claim to more of the estate. Skerne took seisin of Joan's mother’s Berkshire manor of East Hanney, and in 1406 Joan settled on a compromise with her sister, Jane, over property in Upminster, Essex, paying Joan an annuity of 4 marks for life. Joan and Skerne also eventually managed to reassert her title to some of the holdings purchased by Alice Perrers in Oxford.

Skerne, however, was not dependent on his wife's estate. He held Downhall in Guildford from Merton College, lands and rents in Kingston upon Thames and Thames Ditton, the manor of Freemantles, Windlesham and land in Hampshire. Bray says, in his History of the County of Surrey that Robert lived at Downhall in Canbury, Kingston upon Thames, styled a 'capital messuage' or 'manor', held of Merton Priory situated to the south of the present day railway bridge. Others have been unable to corroborate that this Robert Skerne lived there.

After Joan’s death, some time before January 1431, Skerne gifted one of the messuages to Osney Abbey in return for admission into the fraternity, and arrangements for prayers to be said in memory of his late wife. He retired from the bench at this time but was signatory to further legal documents dating up to 1435.

== Death and legacy ==
Robert Skerne died 9 April 1437. He was buried alongside his wife in a tomb in All Saints Church, Kingston upon Thames, marked by a monumental brass.

The brass bears the Latin inscription:

Roberti cista Skerni corpus tenet ista,
Marmorie petre, conjugis atque suæ,
Qui validus, sidus, disertus, lege peritus;
Nobilis, ingenuus, persidiam renuit:
Constans sermone, vitâ, sensu, ratione,
Communiter cuique justitiam voluit.
Regalis juris unicos promovit honores;
Fallere vel falli, res odiosa sibi.
Gaudeat in celis, qui vixit in orbe fidelis;
Nonas Aprilis pridie qui moritur,
Mille quadringentis D[omi]ni trigintaque septem
A[ni]mis ipsius Rex miserere Jesu.

The tomb constructed here of marble stone contains
All that of Robert Skerne and of his wife remains,
He being valiant, faithful, cautious, skilled in law,
Noble, ingenious, did treachery abhor:
Constant in speech, in life, in feeling and in thought,
That justice freely and to all was due, he taught.
The honours of the royal law alone he prized.
To cheat or be deceived a thing he quite despised.
May he in heaven rejoice, who lived on earth sincere,
Who died upon the fourth of April in the year
Of Christ one thousand twenty score and thirty seven.
Have mercy on his soul, Jesus, Thou King of Heaven.

Following his uncle's death, his nephew, William, founded a chantry in his honour. William's son, also named Robert, inherited Downhall, Kingston, it subsequently passing to his son, Swithin, in 1485-6.

Parliament of England
Preceded by William Weston I William Yerde	Member of Parliament for Surrey; 1420–1421; With: William Ottworth	Succeeded by John Clipsham; John Bonet
Preceded by John Clipsham; William Ottworth	Member of Parliament for Surrey; 1422–1423	Succeeded by John Clipsham
