= Scadbury =

Scadbury may refer to:

- Scadbury Park, a 300-acre (120 ha) park and nature reserve in Chislehurst, London Borough of Bromley, United Kingdom
- Manor of Scadbury, a ruined manor in Chislehurst, London Borough of Bromley, United Kingdom
