= Manor of Scadbury =

Historic manor in Bromley, London, England

Coordinates: 51.4109°N 0.0967°E

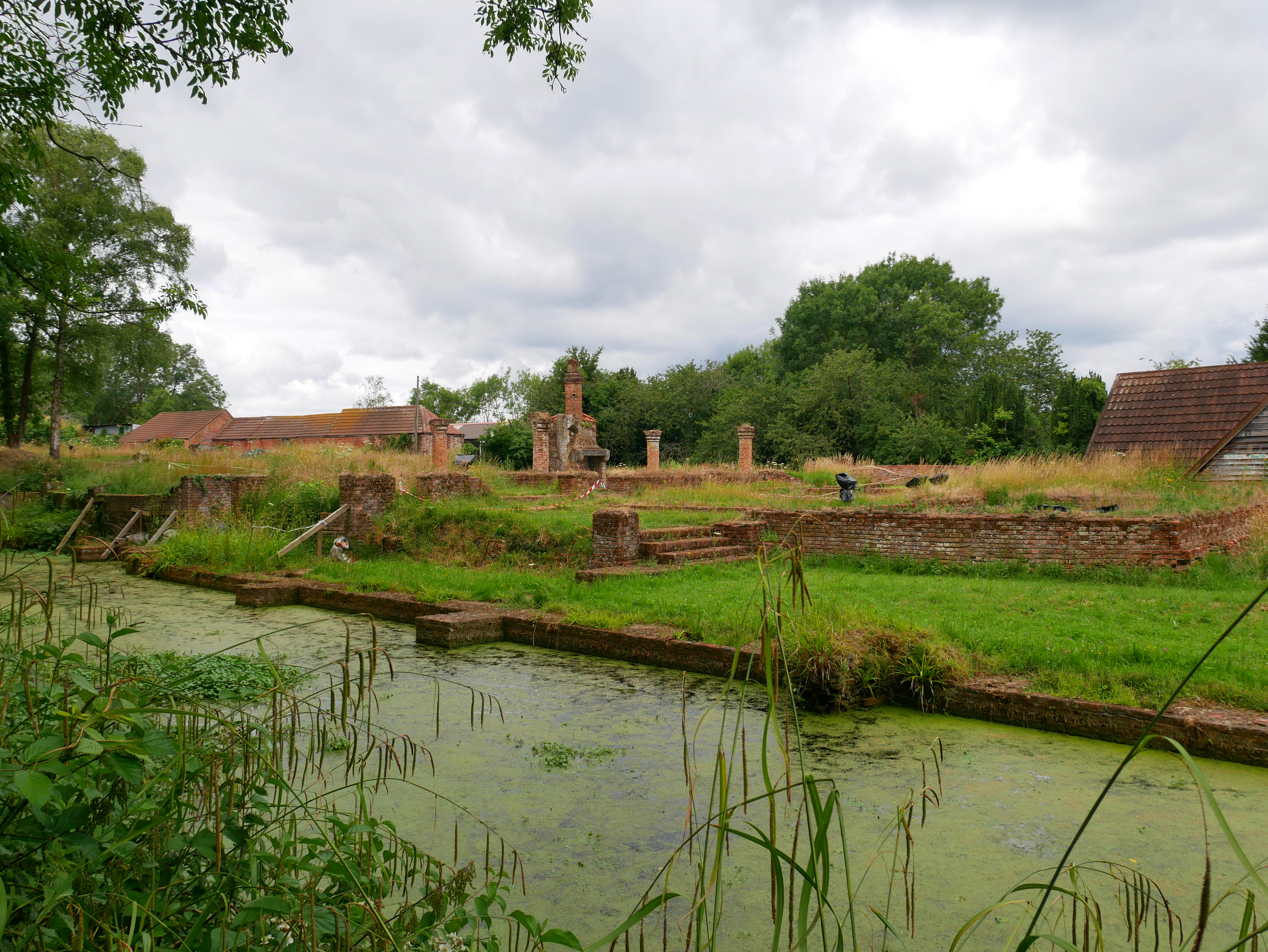
Remains of the manor house of Scadbury

Scadbury is a historic manor in the parish of Chislehurst in the London Borough of Bromley, England. Much of the estate is preserved today as Scadbury Park, a 300-acre (120 ha) Local Nature Reserve and a Site of Metropolitan Importance for Nature Conservation. The manorial chapel, known as the Scadbury Chapel, survives in the church of St Nicholas at Chislehurst, and served as a burial place for owners of the estate, including members of the Walsingham family.

== History ==
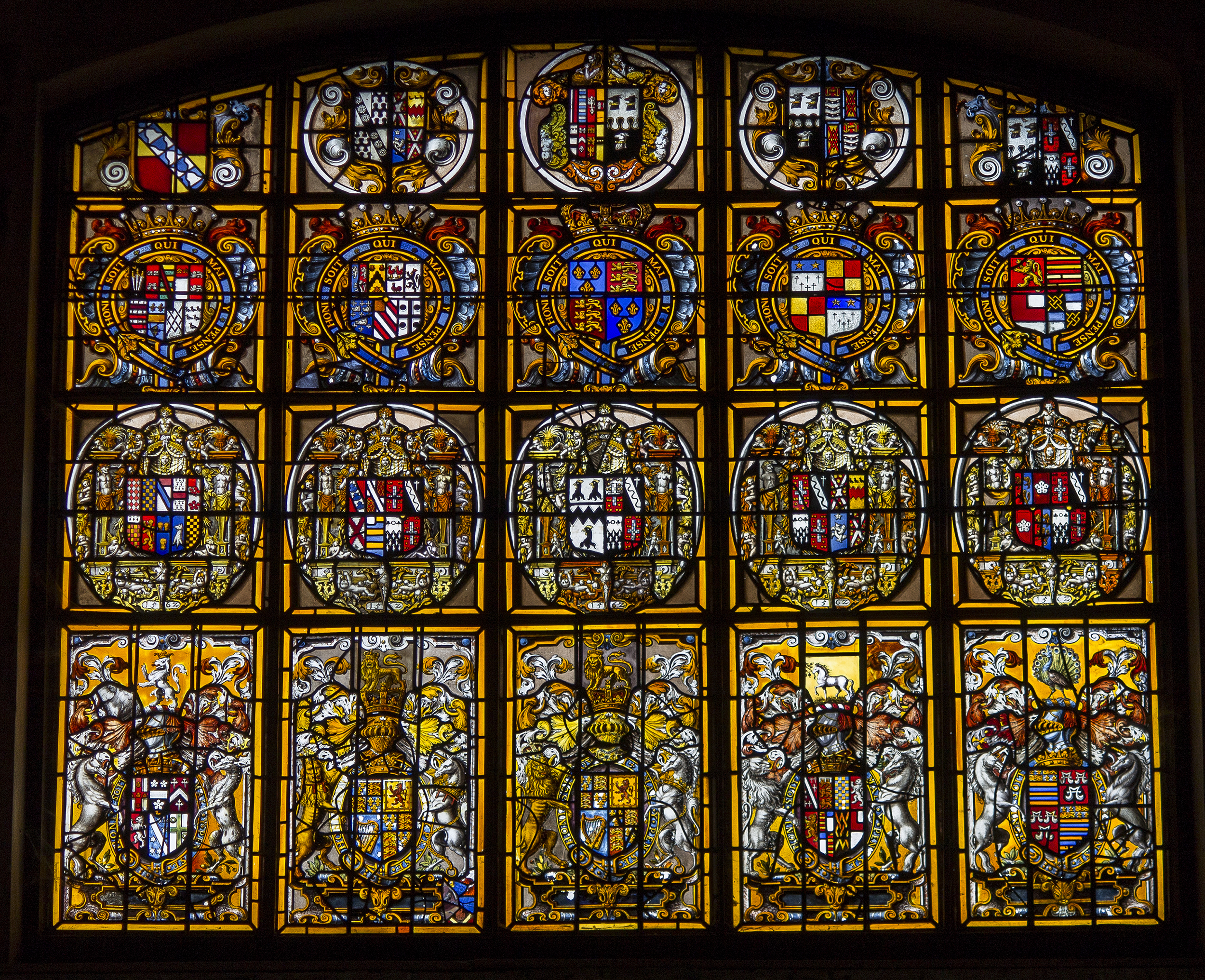
Heraldic stained glass in Mereworth Church showing Walsingham coats of arms

The manor is first recorded in the thirteenth century, when it was held by the de Scathebury family. In 1424 it was purchased by Thomas Walsingham (died 1457) a wealthy wine and cloth merchant in London and a Member of parliament. He married Margaret Bamme, daughter of Henry Bamme, of the City of London, a member of the Worshipful Company of Goldsmiths. Walsingham added additional land to the estate in 1433.

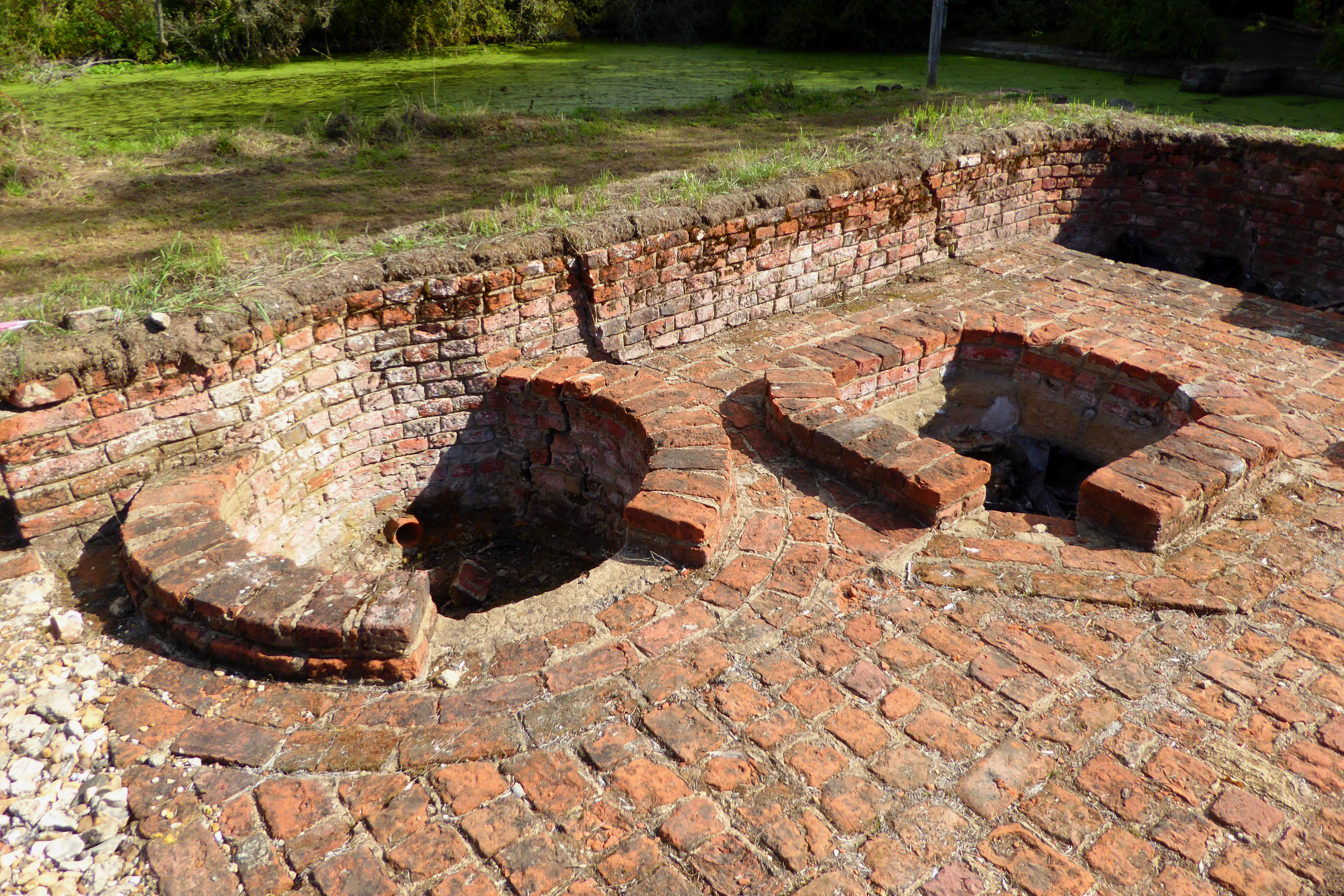
Ovens exposed in the ruined manor house building

His son, Thomas Walsingham (1436–1467) married Constance Dryland (died 14 November 1476), a daughter of James Dryland, of Davington, by whom he had a son, James Walsingham (1462 – 10 December 1540). Constance survived him and remarried to John Green, who in 1476 was Sheriff of Kent in right of his wife. James Walsingham married Eleanor Writtle (born before 1465, died after 1540), the daughter and heiress of Walter Writtle of Bobbingworth, Essex, by whom, according to a monumental brass formerly in the church at Scadbury, he had four sons and seven daughters. His second son was William Walsingham (died 1534), of Foots Cray in Kent, who was the father of Sir Francis Walsingham, Principal Secretary to Queen Elizabeth I.

James' eldest son and heir was Sir Edmund Walsingham (c. 1480 – 10 February 1550), a soldier, Member of Parliament, and Lieutenant of the Tower of London during the reign of King Henry VIII. His son, Thomas Walsingham (c. 1526 – 1584), inherited and married Dorothy Guildford (died 1584), the daughter of Sir John Guildford.

Thomas and Dorothy had five sons. The oldest, Guldeford, predeceased his father and the estate had passed to the second son, Edmund, who died in 1589, following which the third son, Sir Thomas Walsingham (died 1630) inherited. He was an MP and was patron of Christopher Marlowe, who was known to have been staying at Scadbury just before his violent death in 1593. Sir Thomas' son and heir, also Sir Thomas Walsingham was Vice-Admiral of Kent. He sold Scadbury in 1660.

Many of the Walsingham family's marriages are represented heraldically in stained glass escutcheons dated 1562 now forming the east window of Mereworth Church in Kent.

During the 1670s Scadbury was the seat of Richard Betenson (1602-1679). In 1736 the estate of Scadbury was purchased by Col. John Selwyn (1688–1751) who passed it on in 1742 to Thomas Townshend, 1st Viscount Sydney, after whom the city of Sydney, Australia was named. The estate was purchased by the London Borough of Bromley in 1983 and opened to the public in 1985.

== References and sources ==
- Adams, Simon; Bryson, Alan; Leimon, Mitchell (2004). "Walsingham, Sir Francis (c.1532–1590)". Oxford Dictionary of National Biography (online ed.). Oxford University Press. doi:10.1093/ref:odnb/28624. (Subscription, Wikipedia Library access or UK public library membership required.)
- Arnold, Frederick H. (1871). "Racton". Sussex Archaeological Collections. XXIII. Lewes, Sussex: Sussex Archaeological Society: 1–19. doi:10.5284/1085399.
- Bannerman, W. Bruce, ed. (1899). The Visitations of the County of Surrey. Vol. XLIII. London: Harleian Society. pp. 11, 33.
- Dugdale, Thomas (1835). Curiosities of Great Britain; England and Wales Delineated. Vol. II. p. 468.
- Lee, Sidney (1899). "Walsingham, Sir Edmund (1490?–1550)" . In Lee, Sidney (ed.). Dictionary of National Biography. Vol. 59. London: Smith, Elder & Co. pp. 228–30.
- Lysons, Daniel (1796). The Environs of London. Vol. IV. London: T. Cadell. p. 351.
- Metcalfe, Walter C., ed. (1879). The Visitations of Essex, Part II. Vol. XIV. London: Harleian Society. pp. 543, 622.
- Nichols, John Gough, ed. (1866). The Herald and Genealogist. Vol. III. London: J.G. Nichols. pp. 49–53.
- Robertson, W.A. Scott (January 1880). "Chislehurst and its Church". Archaeologia Cantiana. XIII (1). London: Mitchell & Hughes: 386–409.
- Robison, William B. (2004). "Walsingham, Sir Edmund (c. 1480–1550)". Oxford Dictionary of National Biography (online ed.). Oxford University Press. doi:10.1093/ref:odnb/28622. (Subscription, Wikipedia Library access or UK public library membership required.)
