= Thomas Walsingham (disambiguation) =

Thomas Walsingham (died c. 1422) was a chronicler of the Peasants' Revolt.

Thomas Walsingham may also refer to:

- Thomas Walsingham (died 1457), MP for Wareham and Lyme Regis
- Thomas Walsingham (c. 1526 – 1584), MP for Maidstone in 1571
- Thomas Walsingham (literary patron) (1561–1630), 16th-century courtier, MP for Rochester and literary patron
- Thomas Walsingham (died 1669) (c.1589–1669), MP for Rochester, son of above

== See also ==
- Thomas de Grey, 2nd Baron Walsingham (1748–1818), British peer and politician; Joint Postmaster General
- Thomas de Grey, 6th Baron Walsingham (1843–1919), English politician and amateur entomologist
