= Thomas Vincent =

Thomas Vincent may refer to:

- Thomas Vincent (minister) (1634–1678), English Puritan minister
- Thomas Vincent (MP) (1544–1613), MP for Poole
- Thomas Vincent (MP died 1700) (c.1660–1700), MP for Reigate
- Thomas Vincent (director) (born 1964), French film director
- Tom Vincent (born 1956), American comic book artist
- Thomas Vincent (MP for St Mawes) (1544-1614), MP for St. Mawes
