= Sir Francis Vincent, 1st Baronet =

English peer and politician

Sir Francis Vincent, 1st Baronet (c. 1568 – 14 March 1640) was an English politician and peer. He sat as MP for Surrey in 1626.

He was the first son of Sir Thomas Vincent (died 1613) and Jane, daughter and heiress of Thomas Lyfield. He was educated at Corpus Christi College, Oxford in 1582 and entered Lincoln's Inn in 1587. On 29 June 1589, he married with £2000, Sarah (died 13 June 1608), the daughter of Sir Amias Paulet and they had five sons (two predeceased him) and two daughters (one predeceased him). He married his second wife, Mary, the daughter of Henry Archer and he married his third wife, Eleanor (died 10 August 1645), the daughter of Robert Malet and widow of Sir Arthur Acland. He was knighted in July 1603 and created a baronet on 26 July 1620.
