= Surrey (UK Parliament constituency) =

Parliamentary constituency in the United Kingdom, 1801–1832

- Former county constituency for the House of Commons

1290–1832
- Seats: two
- Replaced by: East Surrey, Greenwich. Lambeth and West Surrey

Surrey was a constituency of the House of Commons of the Parliament of England, then of the Parliament of Great Britain from 1707 to 1800 and of the Parliament of the United Kingdom from 1801 to 1832. It was represented by two Members of Parliament until 1832.

The constituency was split into two two-member divisions, for Parliamentary purposes, in 1832. The county was then represented by the East Surrey and West Surrey constituencies.

== Boundaries ==
Surrey is one of the historic counties of England, located south of the River Thames, in south east England. The constituency comprised the whole county but had six towns which were boroughs for some of when it was a constituency: Bletchingley, Gatton, Guildford, Haslemere, Reigate and Southwark - each of which elected two MPs in their own right, these were not excluded from the county constituency, and owning property within the boroughs could confer a vote at the county election.)

== Members of Parliament ==
=== 1290-1640 ===
Parliament	First member	Second member
1290	Roland of Oxted	
1360	Nicholas Carew	
1377 (Oct)	Nicholas Carew	
1378	John Hathersham I	
1379	John Legh	
1380 (Nov)	William Weston I	
1381	John Hathersham I	
1382 (May)	John Hathersham I	
1383 (Oct)	John Hathersham I	
1386	Sir James Berners	John Newdigate
1388 (Feb)	John Hathersham I	Hugh Quecche
1388 (Sep)	John Thorpe	Thomas Kynnersley
1390 (Jan)	John Thorpe	John Hathersham I
1390 (Nov)	William Weston I	John Bentley
1391	Sir Thomas Brewes	Ralph Cuddington
1393	Sir Thomas Brewes	William Weston I
1394	Nicholas Carew	William Weston I
1395	Nicholas Carew	Robert Loxley
1397 (Jan)	Nicholas Carew	William Weston I
1397 (Sep)	Nicholas Carew	Thomas Wintershall
1399	John Hathersham II	Ralph Cuddington
1401	William Weston I	John Wintershall
1402	John Waterton	Ralph Cuddington
1404 (Jan)	Sir William Brantingham	John Wintershall
1404 (Oct)	Sir William Brantingham	William Croyser
1406	John Wintershall	John Gravesend
1407	Ralph Cuddington	Robert Bussebridge
1410		
1411		
1413 (Feb)		
1413 (May)	John Burgh II	William Yerde
1414 (Apr)	John Bonet	John Clipsham
1414 (Nov)	John Burgh II	John Wintershall
1415	John Burgh II	William Weston I
1416 (Mar)	John Burgh II	William Yerde
1416 (Oct)		
1417	Nicholas Carew	John Clipsham
1419	William Weston I	William Yerde
1420	Robert Skerne	William Ottworth
1421 (May)	John Clipsham	John Bonet
1421 (Dec)	John Clipsham	William Ottworth
1422	Robert Skerne	
1423	John Clipsham	
1425	John Wintershall	
1426	John Clipsham	
1427	John Clipsham	
1433	John Wintershall	
1441	Anthony Brocas	
1459	Ralph Legh	
1460	John Wood	
1478	John Wood	
1510–1523	No names known	
1529	Sir William Fitzwilliam	Sir Nicholas Carew
1536	?Sir William Fitzwilliam	?
1539	Sir Anthony Browne	Sir Christopher More
1542	Sir Anthony Browne	Robert Southwell
1545	Sir Anthony Browne	Sir Edmund Walsingham
1547	Sir Anthony Browne, died 1548 and repl. Jan 1552 by Sir Thomas Cawarden	Sir Christopher More, died 1549 and repl. Feb 1552 by John Vaughan
1553 (Mar)	Sir Thomas Cawarden	Sir Thomas Saunders
1553 (Oct)	Sir Edward Bray	William Saunders
1554 (Apr)	Sir Anthony Browne	Sir Edward Bray
1554 (Nov)	Sir Thomas Cawarden	William Saunders
1555	William Saunders	John Skinner
1558	Sir Thomas Saunders	John Skinner
Parliament of 1559	Sir Thomas Cawarden	Thomas Browne
Parliament of 1563-1567	Hon. Charles Howard	William More
Parliament of 1571	Sir Henry Weston	William More
Parliament of 1572-1583	Hon. (Sir) Charles Howard, ennobled 1573	Thomas Lyfield
By-election 1574	Sir Francis Walsingham	Thomas Lyfield
Parliament of 1584-1585	Sir Francis Walsingham	Sir William More
Parliament of 1586-1587	Sir Francis Walsingham	Sir William More
Parliament of 1588-1589	Sir Francis Walsingham	William Howard
Parliament of 1593	Sir John Wolley	Sir William More
Parliament of 1597-1598	Lord Howard of Effingham (1597); Hon. Charles Howard (1597-8)	(Sir) George More
Parliament of 1601	Lord Howard of Effingham	(Sir) George More
Parliament of 1604-1611	Sir Edmund Bowyer	Sir Robert More
Addled Parliament (1614)	Sir Edmund Bowyer	Sir George More
Parliament of 1621-1622	Sir Nicholas Carew	Sir George More
Happy Parliament (1624-1625)	Sir Robert More	Sir Thomas Grimes
Useless Parliament (1625)	Sir Francis Leigh	Sir George More
Parliament of 1625-1626	Sir Francis Vincent	Sir George More
Parliament of 1628-1629	Sir Ambrose Browne	Sir Richard Onslow
No Parliament summoned 1629-1640

=== MPs 1640–1832 ===
Year	First member	First party	Second member	Second party
April 1640	Sir Ambrose Browne	Parliamentarian	Sir Richard Onslow	Parliamentarian
November 1640	Sir Ambrose Browne	Parliamentarian	Sir Richard Onslow	Parliamentarian
December 1648	Browne and Onslow excluded in Pride's Purge - both seats vacant			
1653	Samuel Highland		Lawrence March	
Surrey's representation was increased to six members in the First and Second parliaments of the Protectorate
1654	Sir Richard Onslow, Arthur Onslow, Francis Drake, Major-General John Lambert, Robert Holman, Colonel Robert Wood			
1656	Sir Richard Onslow, Arthur Onslow, Francis Drake, Lewis Audley, George Duncombe, John Blackwell			
Representation reverted to two members in the Third Protectorate Parliament
January 1659	Arthur Onslow		Francis Drake	
May 1659	Not represented in the restored Rump			
April 1660	The Lord Aungier		Daniel Harvey	
1661	(Sir) Adam Browne		Sir Edmund Bowyer	
1679	Arthur Onslow		George Evelyn	
1685	Sir Adam Browne		Sir Edward Evelyn	
1689	Sir Richard Onslow	Whig	George Evelyn	
1690	Sir Richard Onslow	Whig	Sir Francis Vincent	
1695	Sir Richard Onslow	Whig	Denzil Onslow	Whig
1698	Sir Richard Onslow	Whig	John Weston	
1702	Sir Richard Onslow	Whig	Leonard Wessell	
1705	Sir Richard Onslow	Whig	Sir William Scawen	
1710	Hon. Heneage Finch		Sir Francis Vincent	
1713	Hon. Heneage Finch		Sir Richard Onslow	Whig
1715 by-election	Hon. Heneage Finch		Thomas Onslow	Whig
1717 by-election	Hon. Heneage Finch		Denzil Onslow	Whig
1719 by-election	John Walter		Denzil Onslow	Whig
1721 by-election	John Walter		Sir William Scawen	
1722	John Walter		Sir Nicholas Carew	
April 1727 by-election	John Walter		Thomas Scawen	
August 1727	Arthur Onslow		Thomas Scawen	
1741	Arthur Onslow		The Lord Baltimore	
1751 by-election	Arthur Onslow		Thomas Budgen	
1761	George Onslow		Sir Francis Vincent	
1774	James Scawen		Sir Francis Vincent	
1775 by-election	James Scawen		Sir Joseph Mawbey, Bt	Radical
1780	Admiral the Hon. Augustus Keppel		Sir Joseph Mawbey, Bt	Radical
1782 by-election	Viscount Althorp		Sir Joseph Mawbey, Bt	Radical
1783 by-election	Sir Robert Clayton		Sir Joseph Mawbey, Bt	Radical
1784	Hon. William Norton		Sir Joseph Mawbey, Bt	Radical
1789 by-election	Lord William Russell	Whig	Sir Joseph Mawbey, Bt	Radical
1790	Lord William Russell	Whig	Captain the Hon. William Finch	
1794 by-election	Lord William Russell	Whig	Sir John Frederick	Tory
1807	Samuel Thornton	Tory	George Holme Sumner	Tory
1812	Sir Thomas Sutton	Tory	George Holme Sumner	Tory
1813 by-election	Samuel Thornton	Tory	George Holme Sumner	Tory
1818	William Joseph Denison	Whig	George Holme Sumner	Tory
1826	William Joseph Denison	Whig	Charles Nicholas Pallmer	Whig
1830	William Joseph Denison	Whig	John Ivatt Briscoe	Whig
1832	constituency divided			

== Elections ==
The county franchise, from 1430, was held by the owners of freehold land valued at 40 shillings or more. Each voter had as many votes as there were seats to be filled. Votes had to be cast by a spoken declaration, in public, at the hustings, which took place in the county town of Guildford. The expense and difficulty of voting at only one location in the county, together with the lack of a secret ballot contributed to the corruption and intimidation of voters, which was widespread in the unreformed British political system.

The expense, to candidates, of contested elections encouraged the leading families of the county to agree on the candidates to be returned unopposed whenever possible. Contested county elections were therefore unusual.

Where there was only one candidate of a party in successive elections, for the same number of seats, change is calculated on the party vote. Where there was more than one candidate, in one or both successive elections for the same number of seats, then change is calculated on the individual percentage vote.

=== Parliament of the United Kingdom 1801-1832 ===
General election 1802: Surrey (2 seats)
Party	Candidate	Votes	%	±%
Whig	Lord William Russell	Unopposed	N/A	N/A
Tory	Sir John Frederick, Bt	Unopposed	N/A	N/A

- Seat vacated on appointment of Russell as a Lord of the Admiralty 10 February 1806

By-election 22 February 1806: Surrey
Party	Candidate	Votes	%	±%
Whig	Lord William Russell	Unopposed	N/A	N/A
Whig hold				

- Note (1806 by-election): (Source: The Times edition of 24 February 1806)

General election 1806: Surrey (2 seats)
Party	Candidate	Votes	%	±%
Whig	Lord William Russell	315	43.45	N/A
Tory	Samuel Thornton	246	33.93	N/A
Tory	Sir John Frederick, Bt	164	22.62	N/A
Majority		69	9.52	N/A
Turnout		725		N/A
Whig hold		Swing		
Tory hold		Swing		

- Note (1806): Poll 2 days. "Although Mr. Thornton had lost his election for Hull, he resigned on the second day in favour of Sir J. Frederick, who was last on the poll". (Source: Stooks Smith)

General election 1807: Surrey (2 seats)
Party	Candidate	Votes	%	±%
Tory	Samuel Thornton	1,471	52.48	+18.55
Tory	George Holme Sumner	994	35.46	+35.46
Whig	Lord William Russell	338	12.06	−31.39
Majority		956	23.40	N/A
Turnout		2,803		
Tory gain from Whig		Swing		
Tory hold		Swing		

General election 1812: Surrey (2 seats)
Party	Candidate	Votes	%	±%
Tory	George Holme Sumner	1,924	40.66	+5.20
Tory	Thomas Sutton (MP)	1,791	37.85	+37.85
Tory	Sir Thomas Turton, 1st Baronet	1,017	21.49	+21.49
Majority		774	16.36	−6.96
Turnout		4,732		
Tory hold		Swing		
Tory hold		Swing		

- Note (1807): Poll 9 days; 3,296 freeholders cast 4,732 votes. (Source: Stooks Smith)
- Death of Sutton

By-election November 1813: Surrey
Party	Candidate	Votes	%	±%
Tory	Samuel Thornton	1,133	69.04	N/A
Tory	Sir Thomas Turton, 1st Baronet	508	30.96	N/A
Majority		625	38.08	N/A
Turnout		1,641		
Tory hold		Swing	N/A	

- Note (1813 by-election): Poll 4 days; 1,641 freeholders voted. (Source: Stooks Smith)

General election 1818: Surrey (2 seats)
Party	Candidate	Votes	%	±%
Tory	George Holme Sumner	Unopposed	N/A	N/A
Whig	William Joseph Denison	Unopposed	N/A	New

General election 1820: Surrey (2 seats)
Party	Candidate	Votes	%	±%
Tory	George Holme Sumner	Unopposed	N/A	N/A
Whig	William Joseph Denison	Unopposed	N/A	N/A

General election 1826: Surrey (2 seats)
Party	Candidate	Votes	%	±%
Whig	William Joseph Denison	2,309	40.23	N/A
Whig	Charles Nicholas Pallmer	2,056	35.82	N/A
Tory	George Holme Sumner	1,375	23.95	N/A
Majority		681	12.87	N/A
Turnout		5,740		N/A
Whig gain from Tory		Swing		
Tory hold		Swing		

- Note (1826): Poll 5 days; 3,743 freeholders cast 5,740 votes. (Source: Stooks Smith)

General election 1830: Surrey (2 seats)
Party	Candidate	Votes	%	±%
Whig	William Joseph Denison	2,159	44.08	+3.85
Whig	John Ivatt Briscoe	1,487	30.36	+30.36
Tory	Hylton Jolliffe	1,252	25.56	+1.61
Majority		235	4.80	−8.07
Turnout		4,898		
Whig hold		Swing		
Whig hold		Swing		

- Note (1830): Poll 3 days; 2,977 freeholders cast 4,898 votes. (Source: Stooks Smith)

General election 1831: Surrey (2 seats)
Party	Candidate	Votes	%	±%
Whig	William Joseph Denison	Unopposed	N/A	N/A
Whig	John Ivatt Briscoe	Unopposed	N/A	N/A

- Constituency abolished - county split into two divisions (1832)

== See also ==
- List of former United Kingdom Parliament constituencies
- Unreformed House of Commons
