= Charles Nicholas Pallmer =

English politician, West Indies estate owner and supporter of slavery

Member of Parliament for Ludgershall
- In office June 1815 – June 1817

Member of Parliament for Surrey
- In office 1826–1830

Personal details
- Born: 1772 Jamaica
- Died: 30 December 1848 (aged 76) Boulogne-sur-Mer, France
- Party: Whig
- Spouse: Maria Francis Dennis (m. 1808)

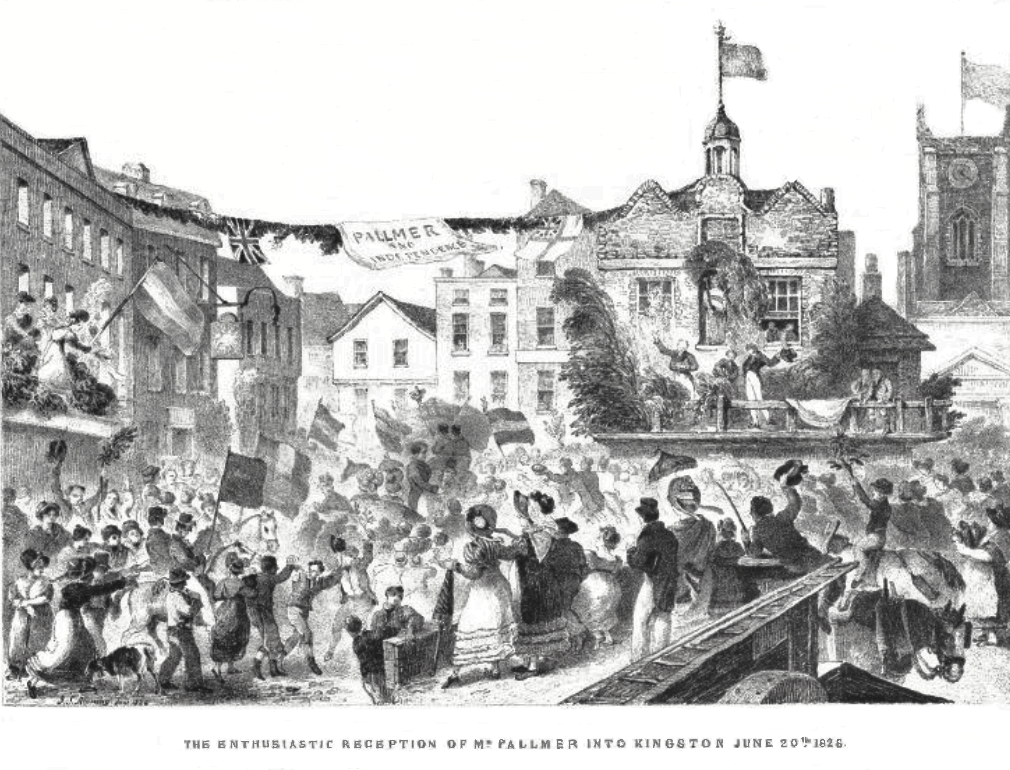
Enthusiastic reception of Pallmer into Kingston after his election, 20 June 1826

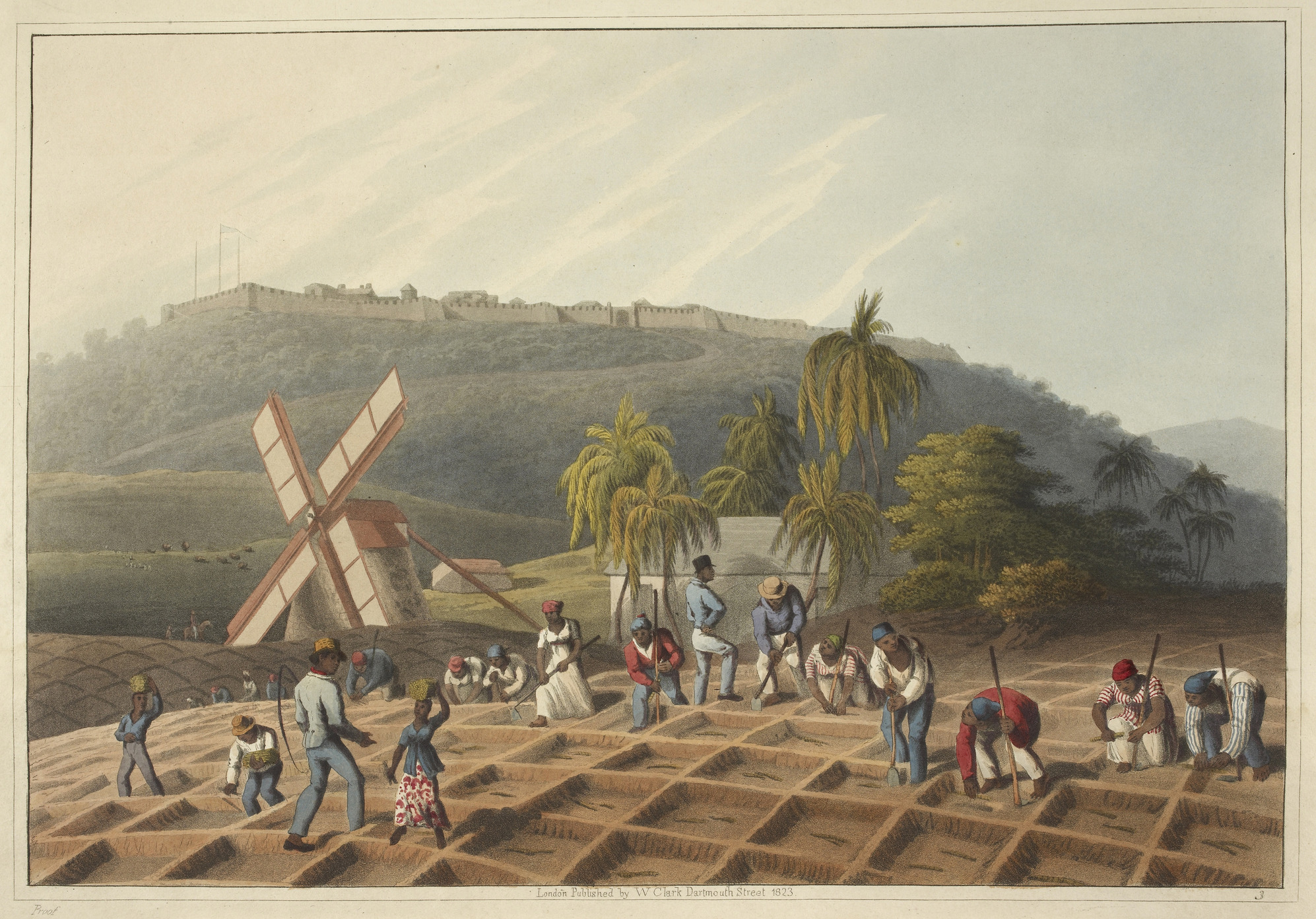
West Indies sugar plantation, similar to that owned by Pallmer

Charles Nicholas Pallmer (1772 – 30 September 1848) was an English politician, West Indies estate owner and a supporter of slavery. He twice served as a Member of Parliament (MP), with his later career overshadowed by high debts and bankruptcy.

== Life ==
Charles Nicholas Pallmer was born in Jamaica in 1772. He was the eldest son of Charles Pallmer, an owner of a large Jamaican sugar plantation in Clarendon, employing several hundred slaves. Pallmer later inherited the estate.

In June 1808 Pallmer married Maria Francis Dennis, who had inherited Norbiton Place, a house and estate near Kingston Upon Thames, Surrey. This became their main residence, Pallmer greatly altering and extending the estate using the services of architect Edward Lapidge. The changes included adding a grotto, a dairy styled like an Indian temple and a lodge in the form of a doric temple. Pallmer also acquired neighbouring Norbiton Hall. This he sold in 1829 to the Countess of Liverpool, widow of the former prime minister, Lord Liverpool, with whom Pallmer had been on friendly terms.

=== MP for Ludershall, (1815–17) ===
In a June 1815 by-election, Pallmer stood as a Whig, and was returned as MP for Ludgershall, Wiltshire. In Parliament he championed the cause of West Indies planters. While the slave trade in British colonies had been abolished in 1807, slave ownership continued, and Pallmer was among those who resisted William Wilberforce's slave registry bill, which slave owners feared would lead to eventual emancipation. At the end of the 1817 session he vacated his seat and left Parliament.

Out of Parliament he remained a prominent figure in the opposition to emancipation, chairing the standing committee of the London Society of West India Planters and Merchants from 1818 to 1820.

=== High Sheriff of Surrey, (1822) ===
Pallmer served as High Sheriff of Surrey in 1822, an honour that involved administrative and ceremonial duties across the county. A Surrey resident, he had previously held a number of other county appointments, including bailiff of Kingston in 1819.

=== MP for Surrey, (1826–30) ===
In the June 1826 general election Pallmer, standing as a Whig, was returned as MP for Surrey. He again played a leading role in promoting the interests of West Indies planters, lobbying for compensation for slave owners in the event of abolition. He defended the tax advantages enjoyed by West Indian over East Indian sugar and, in January 1829, led a delegation to the prime minister, the Duke of Wellington, to lobby for a reduction in sugar duties. While sympathetic for some measure of parliamentary reform, Pallmer opposed Catholic emancipation, believing that the Protestant constitution would be endangered by the government's Catholic Relief Bill.

He did not contest the 1830 general election, and retired from politics. Citing health problems, the real reason appeared to be his mounting debts.

=== Later life ===
Pallmer had clearly been living above his means and had accumulated large debts. He left for France in March 1831, and was declared bankrupt a month later. While many of his creditors were eventually paid, he continued to live abroad, including in Jamaica and France. He died in Boulogne-sur-Mer on 30 December 1848, aged 76.

There is a memorial to Pallmer in All Saints Church, Kingston upon Thames.

== Bibliography ==
- Biden, William Downing (1852). The History and Antiquities of the Ancient and Royal Town of Kingston-upon-Thames. William Lindsey, Kingston. Accessed 4 April 2020
- Fisher, D.R. (2009). The History of Parliament: the House of Commons 1820-1832. Cambridge University Press. ISBN 9780521193146. Accessed 4 April 2020
- Hague, D.R. (2007). William Wilberforce: The Life of the Great Anti-Slave Trade Campaigner. Harper Press, London. ISBN 978-0-00-722885-0. Accessed 4 April 2020
- Oliver, Vere Langford (1909). Caribbeana. Vol. III. London: Mitchell Hughes & Clarke. Accessed 19 May 2025
- Malden, H.E., ed. (1911). A History of the County of Surrey: Volume 3. Victoria County History, London. Accessed 4 April 2020
- Prosser, G.F. (1828). Select Illustrations of the County of Surrey. Rivington, London. Accessed 4 April 2020
- Thorne, R G. (1986). The History of Parliament: the House of Commons 1790-1820. Boydell and Brewer. ISBN 9780436521010. Accessed 4 April 2020
