= Norbiton =

District in south-west London

Coordinates: 51.41194°N 0.28311°W

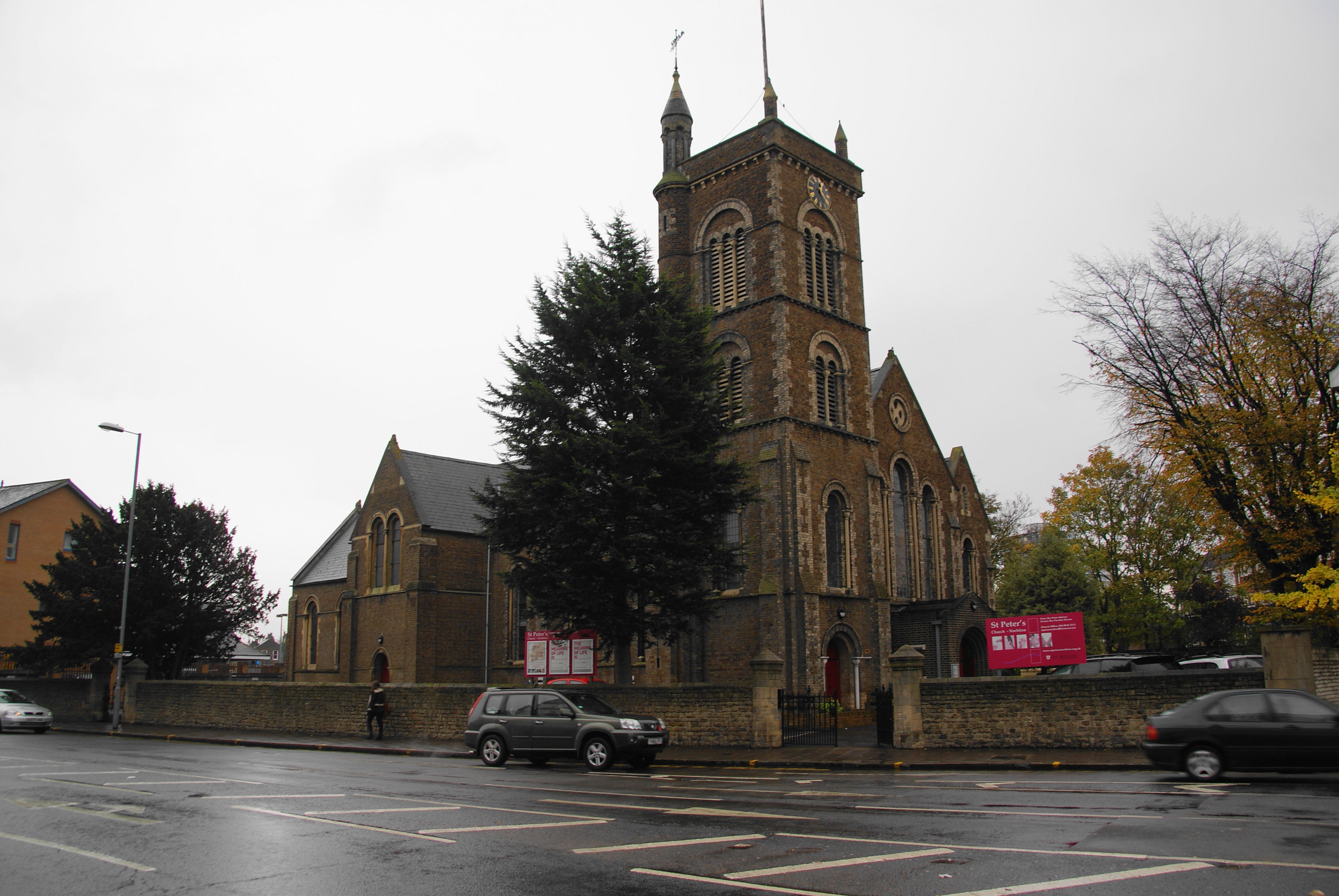
- St Peter's Church

- Location within Greater London
- Population: 10,107 (2011 Census. Ward)
- OS grid reference: TQ195695
- London borough: Kingston
- Ceremonial county: Greater London
- Region: London
- Country: England
- Sovereign state: United Kingdom
- Post town: Kingston upon Thames
- Postcode district: KT1, KT2
- Dialling code: 020
- Police: Metropolitan
- Fire: London
- Ambulance: London
- UK Parliament: Kingston and Surbiton
- London Assembly: South West

Norbiton is an area within the Royal Borough of Kingston upon Thames, London. It lies approximately 1 mile (1.6 km) east of Kingston upon Thames town centre, and 11 miles (17.7 km) from Charing Cross. Its main landmarks include Kingston Hospital, Kingsmeadow football stadium, Kingston Cemetery and St Peter's Anglican parish church which serves the area.

Norbiton was part of the Municipal Borough of Kingston-upon-Thames in Surrey from its creation in 1835, and became part of the larger Royal Borough of Kingston upon Thames in 1965.

== History ==
Norbiton ward of Kingston upon Thames Municipal Borough, 1868.

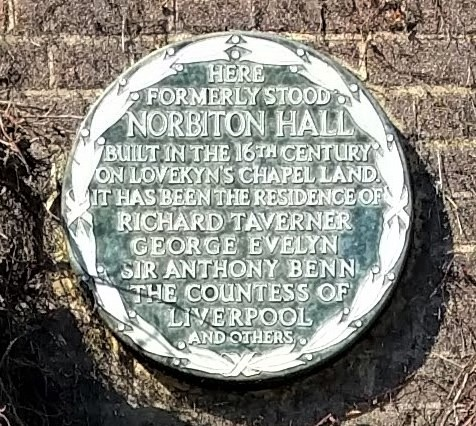
Plaque on flats at site of original Norbiton Hall

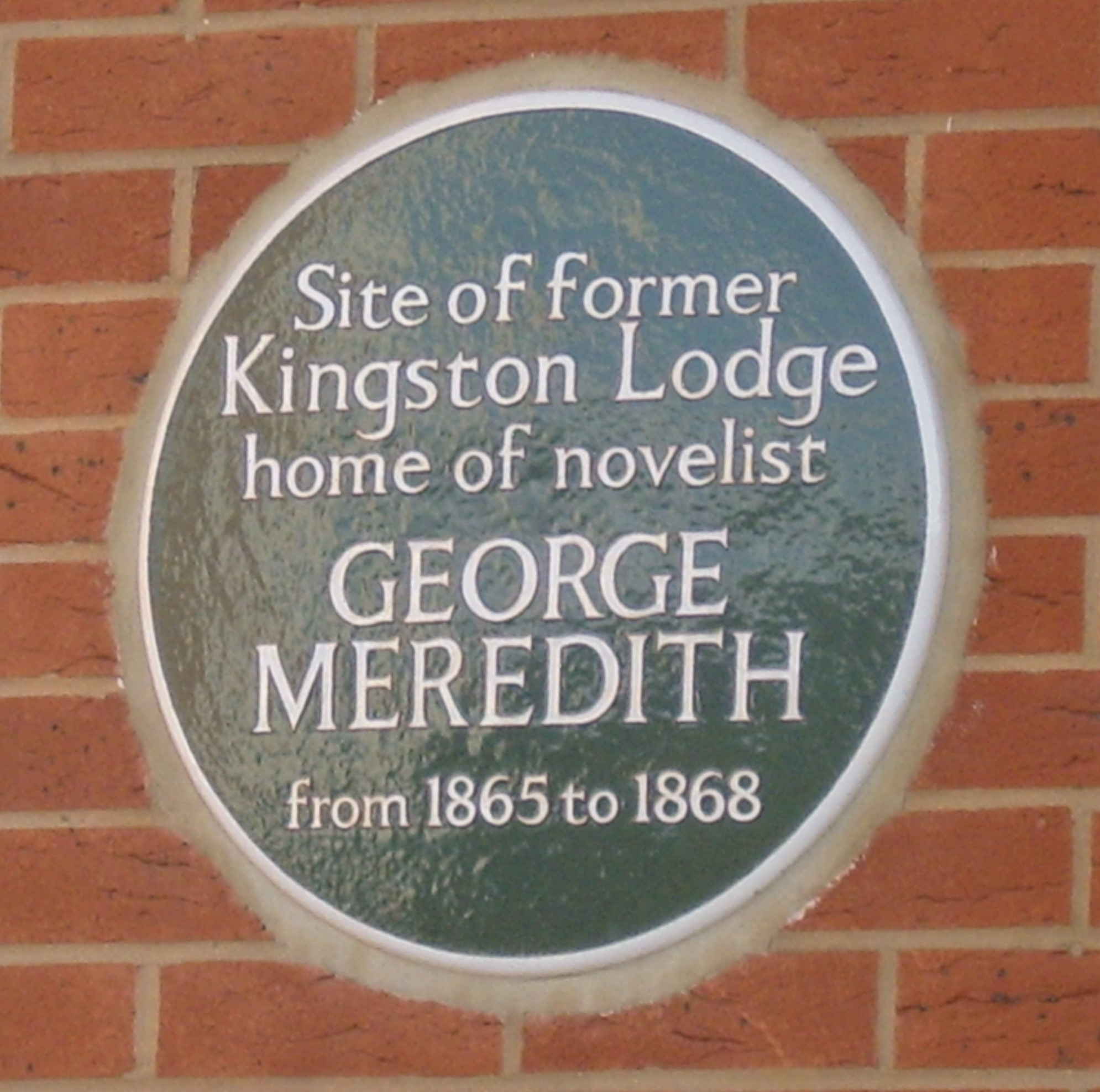
Plaque at site of Kingston Lodge

Its name was originally Norberton(e) and it was named in a similar way to Surbiton on the opposite side of the Hogsmill River. The origin of the place-name is from the Old English words north, bere and tun (meaning northern grange or outlying farm).

The area was originally a part of the parish of All Saints Church, Kingston upon Thames. In 1840 a separate Norbiton parish was created, with St Peter's Church built between 1840 and 1842 to a design of Gilbert Scott and William Moffatt.

Until the mid-nineteenth century much of Norbiton was made up of country estates, all since sold as housing land. These included:

Norbiton Hall, a manor from the 16th century. Residents included Richard Taverner, who lived there 1547–75 and Sir Anthony Benn, 1605–18. In 1829, the Surrey MP Charles Pallmer sold the estate to Mary, Countess of Liverpool, widow of the late prime minister Lord Liverpool. It was finally demolished in the 1930s to make way for a complex of flats, also called Norbiton Hall. These flats were built between 1933 and 1935 and received local listing in 2018.

Norbiton Place was bought by Sir John Philipps, who died there in 1764. One of the family's servants was Cesar Picton, originally an African slave, he was brought to England aged six in 1761. He lived at Norbiton Place for nearly thirty years, before becoming a successful coal-merchant in Kingston. In the early 1800s Norbiton Place became the main residence of Charles Pallmer, owner of neighbouring Norbiton Hall. Pallmer greatly developed the estate, including adding a dairy styled like an Indian temple and a lodge in the form of a doric temple. Living above his means, Pallmer was declared bankrupt in 1831. Much of the main house was pulled down after 1830, with St Peter's Church built on part of the grounds.

Kingston Lodge, opposite Norbiton Hall, was leased by Novelist George Meredith in 1865. Disliking the increasing development of the area, he moved away at the end of 1867.

== Norbiton today ==
Norbiton's housing stock largely consists of large Victorian and Edwardian family houses, plus small localised brownfield redevelopments of 1960s, 1980s and modern flats. It contains more council and social housing than most other areas of Kingston – one of the largest such sites, the Cambridge Road estate, was used as a fictional council estate in TV drama The Bill, as well as the BBC sitcom Some Girls and Goodbye Charlie Bright, a film by Nick Love. In 2020 plans were agreed to regenerate the Cambridge Road estate, including demolishing 865 existing homes and building 2,170 new ones. Homes on the renewed estate will obtain heating by a process that turns treated sewage into clean energy, the first such scheme in England.

As Norbiton is only 25 minutes by train from Waterloo station, the suburban population includes a large concentration of London commuters. Norbiton railway station was used as a location for the British sitcom The Fall and Rise of Reginald Perrin. The headquarters of the Fire Brigades Union is located close to the station, on Coombe Road.

Kingsmeadow football stadium in Norbiton was bought by Chelsea FC in 2016 and has been used for the home matches of Chelsea F.C. Women since 2017. It was previously used as a home ground by Kingstonian F.C. (1989–2017) and by AFC Wimbledon (2002–20).

In the 2018 Kingston borough elections, both council seats in Norbiton ward were gained by the Liberal Democrats from Labour, leaving Labour with no seats on the council.

== Education ==
Education in Norbiton. See the main Royal Borough of Kingston upon Thames article.

== Politics ==
Norbiton is part of the Kingston and Surbiton constituency for elections to the House of Commons.

Norbiton is part of the Norbiton ward for elections to Kingston upon Thames London Borough Council.

== Transport and locale ==
=== Nearby places ===
- Berrylands
- Canbury
- Coombe
- Kingston
- New Malden
- Surbiton
- Wimbledon

=== Nearest railway stations ===
- Norbiton railway station
- Kingston railway station
- Berrylands railway station
- New Malden railway station
