= Thomas Vincent (MP for St Mawes) =

English politician

Thomas Vincent (1544 – 14 December 1613) was an English politician who sat as MP for Poole in 1584.

He was the first son of David Vincent (died 1565) and Elizabeth, the daughter of Spencer of Berks. He was the brother of Henry Vincent. He married Jane, the only daughter and heiress of Thomas Lyfield. They had two sons (including Sir Francis Vincent, 1st Baronet). He may have been knighted in 1601.
