= Henry Vincent (MP for St Mawes) =

English politician

Henry Vincent was MP for St. Mawes in 1593.

He was the younger son of David Vincent (died 1685) and the brother of Thomas Vincent. He married Elizabeth, the widow of Henry Slyfield after 1598.
