= Edmund Walsingham =

Lieutenant of Tower of London

Arms of Walsinghham of Scadbury, Kent: Gules bezantée, a cross couped chequy argent and azure

Sir Edmund Walsingham (c. 1480 – 10 February 1550) of Scadbury Hall, Chislehurst in Kent, was an English soldier, Member of Parliament, and Lieutenant of the Tower of London during the reign of King Henry VIII.

== Origins ==
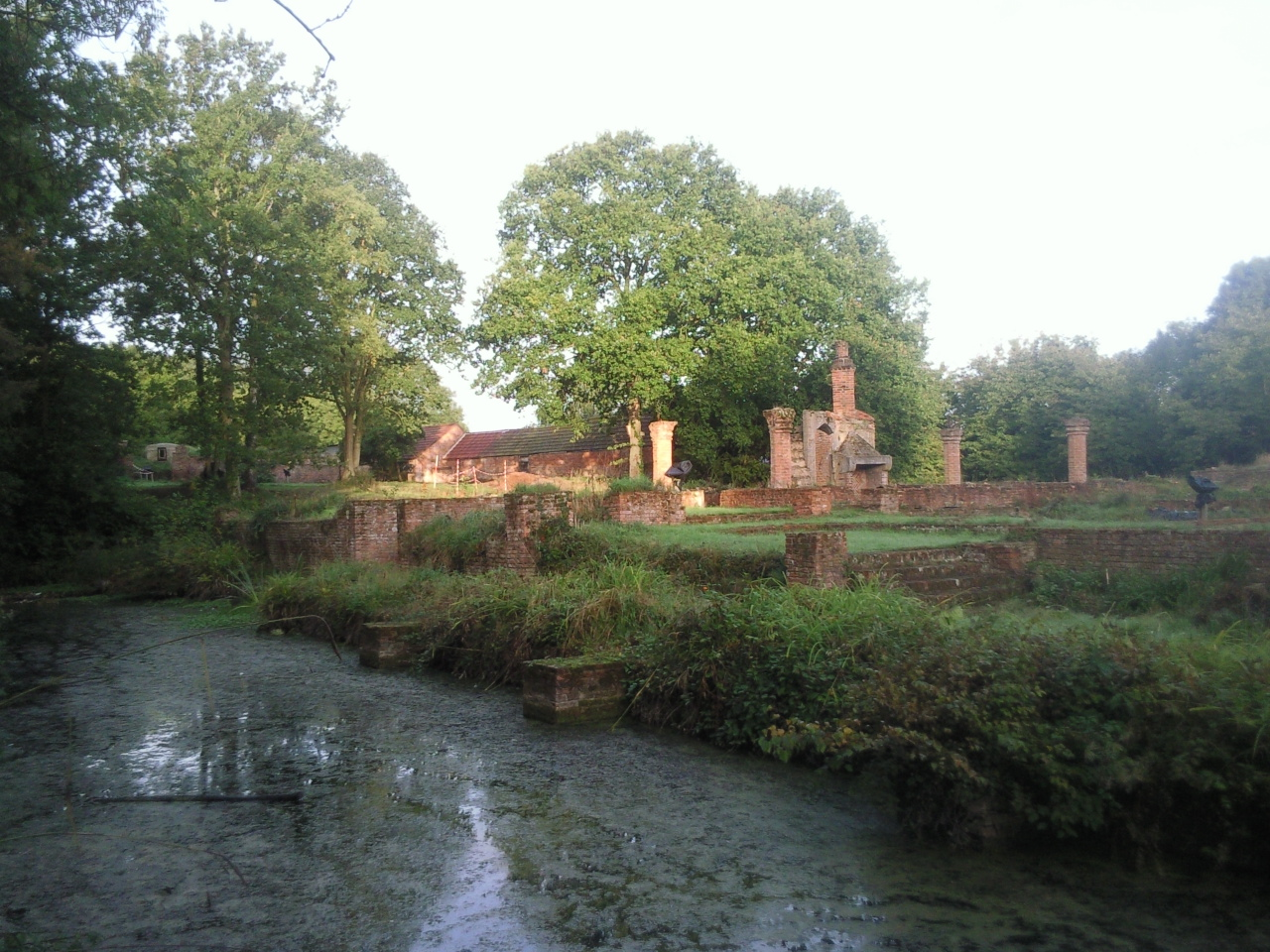
Remains of Scadbury Hall, seat of the Walsingham family

He was the eldest son and heir of James Walsingham (1462–1540) of Scadbury, Kent by his wife Eleanor Writtle (pre-1465 – post-1540), the daughter and heiress of Walter Writtle of Bobbingworth in Essex. Sir Edmund, according to a monumental brass formerly in the church at Scadbury, had three brothers and seven sisters, including:

- William Walsingham (died 1534), who married Joyce Denny (1506/7–1560), the daughter of Sir Edmund Denny, one of the Barons of the Exchequer, and his second wife, Mary Troutbeck (died 1507), the daughter of Robert Troutbeck of Bridge Trafford, Cheshire, by whom he was the father of Sir Francis Walsingham (c.1532–1590), Principal Secretary to Queen Elizabeth I, and five daughters: Elizabeth (died 1596), Barbara, Christian, Eleanor and Mary (1527/8–1577). After William Walsingham's death, Joyce (née Denny) married Sir John Carey, a younger brother of Sir William Carey, by whom she had two sons, Sir Wymond Carey and Sir Edward Carey.
- Elizabeth Walsingham, who married Thomas Ayloffe, second son of William Ayloffe (died 1517), a Bencher of Lincoln’s Inn, by his wife Audrey Shaa, widow of John Writtle and daughter of Sir John Shaa, a London goldsmith and Lord Mayor in 1501. Thomas Ayloffe's elder brother, William Ayloffe (died 1569), married Anne Barnardiston, the daughter of Sir Thomas Barnardiston (died 7 November 1542) of Ketton in Kedington, Suffolk, by whom he was the father of William Ayloffe (c.1535 – 17 November 1584).
- Cecily Walsingham.
- Margaret Walsingham.

=== Early origins ===
Although the Walsingham pedigree is said to date to the thirteenth century, the family is first recorded in the County of Kent in 1424, when Thomas I Walsingham purchased the manor of Scadbury. The descent was as follows:

- Thomas I Walsingham (d.1457) a wealthy wine and cloth merchant in the City of London who served as a Member of Parliament for Wareham in 1410 and for Lyme Regis in 1413, both in Dorset. He married Margaret Bamme, daughter and heiress of Henry Bamme, of the City of London, a member of the Worshipful Company of Goldsmiths. He purchased the manor of Scadbury in the parish of Chislehurst, to which additional land was added in 1433.
- Thomas II Walsingham (1436–1467), son and heir, who married Constance Dryland (died 14 November 1476), a daughter of James Dryland, of Davington, Kent, by whom he had a son, James Walsingham (1462 – 10 December 1540). Constance survived him and remarried to John Green, who in 1476 was Sheriff of Kent in right of his wife.
- James Walsingham, son and heir, who married Eleanor Writtle (born before 1465, died after 1540), the daughter and heiress of Walter Writtle of Bobbingworth, Essex, by whom, according to a monumental brass formerly in the church at Scadbury, he had four sons and seven daughters, the eldest of whom was Sir Edmund Walsingham (d.1550), the subject of this article.

== Career ==
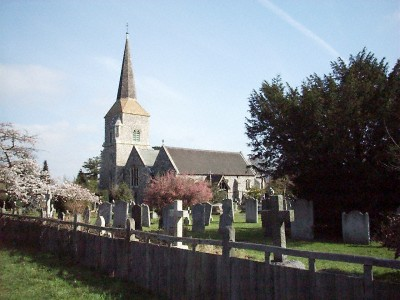
St Nicholas' church, Chislehurst, where Sir Edmund Walsingham was buried

Walsingham entered the service of Thomas Howard, Earl of Surrey (later 3rd Duke of Norfolk), and was knighted by him on 13 September 1513, four days after the decisive English victory over the Scots at the Battle of Flodden, in which the English army was commanded by Surrey's father Thomas Howard, 2nd Duke of Norfolk. In 1520 he was part of the Kent contingent accompanying King Henry VIII at the Field of the Cloth of Gold in Calais in June, and at the King's meeting with the Emperor Charles V at Gravelines in July.

In 1521 he was appointed a sewer in the royal household, was made a freeman of the Worshipful Company of Mercers, was on the jury which tried and convicted Edward Stafford, 3rd Duke of Buckingham, and succeeded Sir Richard Cholmondeley as Lieutenant of the Tower of London at a salary of £100 a year. He held the office until Henry VIII's death in 1547, residing in a house at the Tower, and taking personal charge of prisoners of state, among them Margaret Pole, Countess of Salisbury, Catherine Howard, Henry Courtenay, 1st Marquess of Exeter, Henry Pole, 1st Baron Montagu, Agnes Howard, Duchess of Norfolk, Arthur Plantagenet, 1st Viscount Lisle, Anne Boleyn, Bishop John Fisher and Sir Thomas More. It was to Walsingham that More made his jest on ascending the scaffold, "I pray you, Master Lieutenant, see me safe up, and for my coming down, let me shift for myself".

In the 1530s Walsingham acquired long-term leases of the manors of Tyting in Surrey and Stanground in Huntingdonshire, and in 1543 purchased the manors of Swanton Court, West Peckham and Yokes near Scadbury from Sir Robert Southwell. In 1539, after the Dissolution of the Monasteries, the king granted him nine houses in London, former monastic property.

In 1544 he became vice-chamberlain to Henry VIII's sixth wife, Katherine Parr. He was elected to Parliament as a Knight of the Shire for Surrey in 1545.

== Marriages and issue ==
Walsingham married twice:

=== First marriage ===
Firstly he married Katherine Gounter (or Gunter) (before 1495 – c. 1526), widow of Henry Morgan of Pencoed, Monmouthshire, and a daughter of John Gounter of Chilworth, Surrey, by his wife Elizabeth Attworth (or Utworth), a daughter and heiress of William Attworth, by whom he had four sons and four daughters:

- Sir Thomas Walsingham (c.1526 – 15 January 1584), who married Dorothy Guildford (died 1584), the daughter of Sir John Guildford (died 5 July 1565), by whom he was the father of Sir Thomas Walsingham, patron of Christopher Marlowe.
- George Walsingham, who died young.
- John Walsingham, who died young.
- Walter Walsingham, who died young.
- Mary Walsingham, who married Sir Thomas Barnardiston (died 1551), the son of Sir Thomas Barnardiston (died 7 November 1542) by Anne Lucas, the daughter of Sir Thomas Lucas (died 7 July 1531) of Little Saxham Hall, Suffolk, Solicitor-General to King Henry VII.
- Alice Walsingham (died 21 May 1558), who married Sir Thomas Saunders (died 18 August 1565), third but eldest surviving son of Nicholas Saunders of Charlwood, Surrey, by Alice Hungate, the daughter of John Hungate, by whom she had three sons and two daughters.
- Eleanor Walsingham, who is said to have married Richard Finch, third son of Sir William Finch, Sheriff of Kent, by his first wife, Elizabeth Cromer. Eleanor Walsingham is also said to have married, as his second wife, Edward Baynard (died 1575) of Lackham, Wiltshire, and to have been buried at Lacock, Wiltshire, on 20 August 1559.
- Katherine Walsingham, who died young.

=== Second marriage ===
He married secondly, Anne Jerningham, a daughter of Sir Edward Jerningham (died 6 January 1515) of Somerleyton, Suffolk, by his wife Margaret Bedingfield (died 24 March 1504). At the time of her marriage to Sir Edmund Walsingham, Anne Jerningham was the widow of three successive husbands: Lord Edward Grey (died before 1517), eldest son and heir of Thomas Grey, 1st Marquess of Dorset, and grandson of King Edward IV's wife, Elizabeth Woodville; Henry Barley (died 12 November 1529) of Albury, Hertfordshire; and Sir Robert Drury, Speaker of the House of Commons.

== Death and burial ==
Walsingham died on 9 February 1550 and was buried in "a table tomb, richly ornamented with roses, acorns and foliage gilt" in the Scadbury chapel in the church of St Nicholas at Chislehurst. His son and heir, Thomas Walsingham, erected a monument to his memory in 1581; the inscription begins:

A knight sometime of worthy fame,
Lieth buried under this stony bower,
Sir Edmund Walsingham was his name,
Lieutenant he was of London Tower.

His will, dated 8 February 1550, was proved on 8 November of that year.

== Bibliography ==
- Adams, Simon; Bryson, Alan; Leimon, Mitchell (2004). "Walsingham, Sir Francis (c.1532–1590)". Oxford Dictionary of National Biography (online ed.). Oxford University Press. doi:10.1093/ref:odnb/28624. (Subscription, Wikipedia Library access or UK public library membership required.)
- Arnold, Frederick H. (1871). "Racton". Sussex Archaeological Collections. XXIII. Lewes, Sussex: Sussex Archaeological Society: 1–19. doi:10.5284/1085399.
- Baker, J.H. (2004). "Ayloffe, William (c.1535–1584)". Oxford Dictionary of National Biography (online ed.). Oxford University Press. doi:10.1093/ref:odnb/939. (Subscription, Wikipedia Library access or UK public library membership required.)
- Bannerman, W. Bruce, ed. (1899). The Visitations of the County of Surrey. Vol. XLIII. London: Harleian Society. pp. 11, 33.
- Bridgett, Thomas Edward (1891). Life and Writings of Sir Thomas More. London: Burns & Oates Limited. pp. 363, 365, 425, 434. ISBN 9780598990846.
- Brydges, Egerton (1812). Collins's Peerage of England. Vol. III. London: F.C. and J. Rivington. p. 377.
- Burke, John; Burke, John Bernard (1838). A Genealogical and Heraldic History of the Extinct and Dormant Baronetcies of England. London: Scott, Webster and Geary. p. 40.
- Burke, John; Burke, John Bernard (1844). A Genealogical and Heraldic History of the Extinct and Dormant Baronetcies of England (2nd ed.). London: John Russell Smith. p. 30.
- Challen, W.H. (January 1963). "Lady Anne Grey". Notes and Queries. 10 (1): 5–9. doi:10.1093/nq/10-1-5b.
- Crisp, Frederick Arthur, ed. (1907). Visitation of England and Wales. Vol. Notes 7. London: Privately printed. pp. 170–173.
- Dugdale, Thomas (1835). Curiosities of Great Britain; England and Wales Delineated. Vol. II. p. 468.
- Hyde, Patricia (2004). "Drury, Sir Robert (before 1456–1535)". Oxford Dictionary of National Biography (online ed.). Oxford University Press. doi:10.1093/ref:odnb/8097. (Subscription, Wikipedia Library access or UK public library membership required.)
- Lee, Sidney (1899). "Walsingham, Sir Edmund (1490?–1550)" . In Lee, Sidney (ed.). Dictionary of National Biography. Vol. 59. London: Smith, Elder & Co. pp. 228–30.
- Lysons, Daniel (1796). The Environs of London. Vol. IV. London: T. Cadell. p. 351.
- Metcalfe, Walter C., ed. (1878). The Visitations of Essex. Vol. XIII. London: Harleian Society. pp. 141, 340.
- Metcalfe, Walter C., ed. (1879). The Visitations of Essex, Part II. Vol. XIV. London: Harleian Society. pp. 543, 622.
- Nichols, John Gough, ed. (1866). The Herald and Genealogist. Vol. III. London: J.G. Nichols. pp. 49–53.
- Nichols, John Gough, ed. (1858). The Topographer and Genealogist. Vol. III. London: John Bowyer Nichols and Sons. pp. 208–9.
- "Old Lackham House and Its Owners". Wiltshire Notes and Queries. III. London: Phillimore & Co. 1902.
- Richardson, Douglas (2011). Everingham, Kimball G. (ed.). Magna Carta Ancestry: A Study in Colonial and Medieval Families. Vol. II (2nd ed.). Salt Lake City. ISBN 978-1449966386.
- Robertson, W.A. Scott (January 1880). "Chislehurst and its Church". Archaeologia Cantiana. XIII (1). London: Mitchell & Hughes: 386–409.
- Robison, William B. (2004). "Walsingham, Sir Edmund (c. 1480–1550)". Oxford Dictionary of National Biography (online ed.). Oxford University Press. doi:10.1093/ref:odnb/28622. (Subscription, Wikipedia Library access or UK public library membership required.)
- Rokewode, John Gage (1838). The History and Antiquities of Suffolk. London: Samuel Bentley. pp. 131–3.
- Rye, Walter (1891). The Visitation of Norfolk. Vol. XXXII. London: Harleian Society. pp. 101–2.
