= John Bentley (MP) =

English politician

John Bentley (fl. 1377–1423) was an English politician. He sat as MP for Surrey in November 1390.

He also served as clerk of the Exchequer by 1377 till November 1389; deputy chamberlain of the Exchequer by 29 July 1385 till 6 March 1388; commissioner to take musters in Kingston-upon-Hull in April and July 1386; commissioner of inquiry in May 1386 concerning forgery by the pesager of wool; commissioner of oyer and terminer in Surrey and Sussex in April 1392 concerning a treasure trove; commissioner of array in Surrey in December 1399 and January 1400; chamberlain and King's receiver of Chester from 20 March 1387 till 1 January 1389.

By June 1389, he married Joan, the widow of John Newdigate and they possibly had one son.
