= Edward Braye =

English Member of Parliament (died 1558)

Sir Edward Braye (or Bray; by 1492 – 1558) was an English Royal Navy captain, justice of the peace, high sheriff and Member of Parliament.

He was born the son of John Braye of Eaton Bray, Bedfordshire and the younger brother of Edmund Braye. He was admitted to the Middle Temple in 1509.

He became a naval commander and was knighted in October, 1513 for his bravery at the Battle of Tournai and made captain of the Mary Rose. The following year he was made captain of the Magdaleyn of Founteraby.

He was a justice of the peace for Sussex from 1524 to 1540. In 1535 he purchased the Manor of Shere (including the Vachery) in Surrey from his elder brother, Sir Edmund Braye, to whom it had been bequeathed by his uncle Sir Reginald Braye. He was appointed High Sheriff of Surrey and Sussex for 1539 and was JP for Surrey from 1554 to his death in 1558. He represented Surrey in Parliament as Knight of the Shire twice, October 1553 and April 1554, during the reign of Queen Mary.

He was made Lieutenant of Calais Castle (1541–52), high treasurer for the army against France in 1545 and Constable of the Tower of London in 1556.

On his death he was buried in Cranleigh Church.

== Marriages and issue ==
Bray married firstly, Elizabeth Lovell, daughter and coheir of Henry Lovell of Harting, Sussex (divorced). He married secondly, Beatrix Shirley, daughter of Ralph Shirley of Wiston, Sussex, and widow of Edward Elrington of London. He married thirdly, Jane Browne, widow of Sir Francis Poynings, and daughter of Sir Matthew Browne (died 6 August 1557) of Betchworth, Surrey, by Frideswide Guildford, daughter of Sir Richard Guildford.

Bray was succeeded by his son, Sir Edward Bray, by his second wife Beatrice, who also became an MP.
