= Thomas Saunders (died 1565) =

English politician

Thomas Saunders (by 1513 – 18 August 1565) was an English politician.

== Family ==
Thomas Saunders was the third but eldest surviving son of Nicholas Saunders of Charlwood, Surrey, by Alice Hungate, the daughter of John Hungate.

== Career ==
Saunders entered the Inner Temple in 1527. He was solicitor for the households of Queens Anne of Cleves and Catherine Howard in 1540. He sat on the bench as a justice of the peace for Surrey from 1541 until his death, and was appointed High Sheriff of Surrey and Sussex for 1553–54.

He was elected a member (MP) of the Parliament of England for Gatton in 1542, Surrey in March 1553 and 1558, and Reigate in October 1553.

Saunders died 18 August 1565. His will, dated 7 March 1563, was proved 7 July 1566.

== Marriage and issue ==
Saunders married Alice Walsingham (d. 21 May 1558), the daughter of Sir Edmund Walsingham of Scadbury, Chislehurst, Kent, by his first wife, Katherine Gounter or Gunter; they had 3 sons and 2 daughters.
