= Francis Drake (MP for Surrey) =

English politician

Francis Drake was an English politician who sat in the House of Commons from 1654 to 1659.

Drake was the son of Francis Drake of Esher, Surrey. He was probably admitted at Emmanuel College, Cambridge on 17 March 1627 and was awarded BA in 1631 and MA in 1634. In 1654, he was elected Member of Parliament for Surrey in the First Protectorate Parliament. He was re-elected MP for Surrey in 1656 for the Second Protectorate Parliament and in 1659 for the Third Protectorate Parliament.

Parliament of England
Preceded by Samuel Highland; Lawrence March	Member of Parliament for Surrey; 1654–1659; With: Arthur Onslow 1654–1659; Sir Richard Onslow 1654–1656; Major-General John Lambert 1654; Robert Holman, 1654; Colonel Robert Wood 1654; Lewis Audley 1656; George Duncombe 1656; John Blackwell 1656	Succeeded by Not represented in Restored Rump
