= Jubilee Country Park =

Public park in Bromley, London, England

Coordinates: 51.392°N 0.062°E

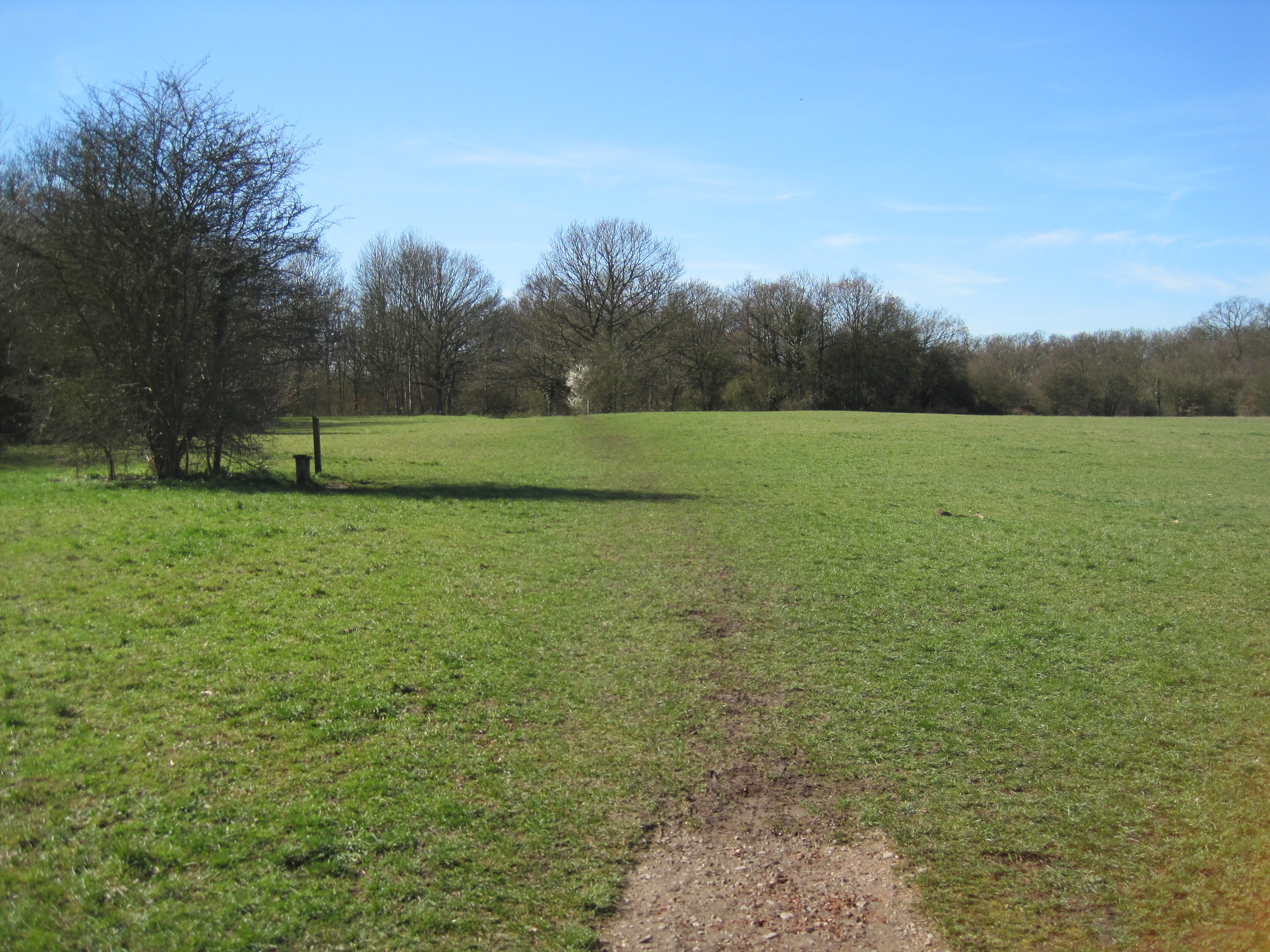
Grassland in Jubilee Country Park

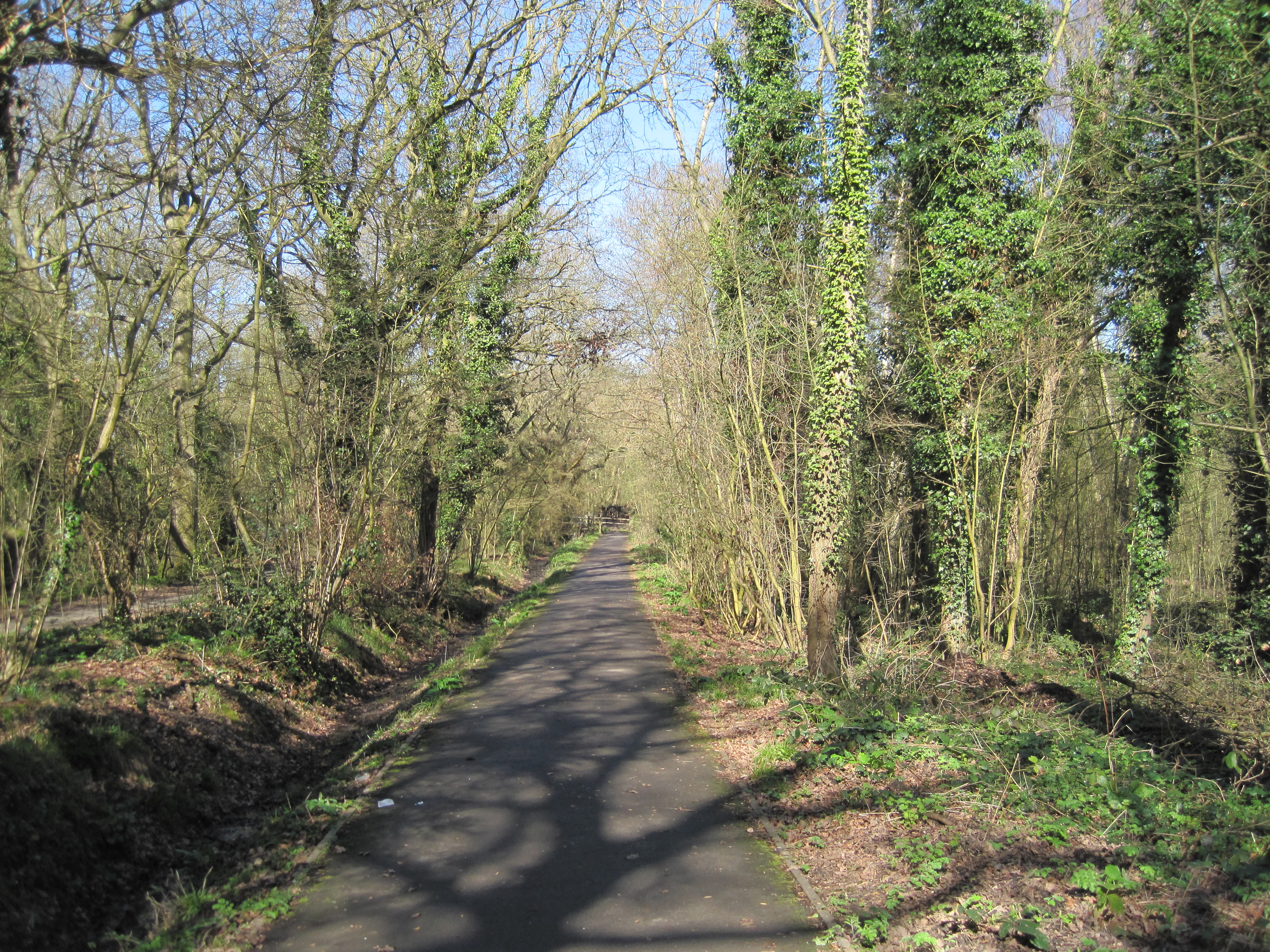
Path in Jubilee Country Park

Jubilee Country Park is a 62-acre (25 ha) public park in Petts Wood in the London Borough of Bromley. It is a Local Nature Reserve and a Site of Metropolitan Importance for Nature Conservation. It was purchased by Bromley Council to celebrate the Silver Jubilee of Queen Elizabeth II in 1977, and opened as a park in 1981.

The park is part of an extensive wildlife corridor together with Petts Wood and Scadbury Park. The London Loop goes through it.

The park consists of extensive areas of grassland and ancient woodland. The grassland has a large population of the rare corkyfruit water dropwort, while midland hawthorns are abundant in the woodland. There is access from Southborough Lane, Blackbrook Lane and Tent Peg Lane.
