= John Legh (14th century MP) =

Member of the Parliament of England

John Legh (fl. 1379) was a Member of Parliament for Surrey in 1379.
