= William Saunders (died 1570) =

English politician

William Saunders (by 1497 – 1570) was an English politician. He was the eldest son of Henry Saunders of Ewell, Surrey. He sat on the Surrey bench as a Justice of the Peace from 1541 to 1564 and was appointed High Sheriff of Surrey and Sussex for 1562–63. He was a Member (MP) of the Parliament of England for Gatton in 1529 and Surrey in October 1553, November 1554 and 1555.

== Family ==
He married twice: firstly Joan (d. 1539/40), the daughter and coheiress of William Marston of Horton, Surrey, and the widow of Nicholas Mynn of London and Norfolk (d. 1528), and secondly Joan (d. 1580/1), the widow of Thomas Gittons of London (d. 1543). He was succeeded by his eldest son Nicholas.

His first wife Joan was the mother of Nicholas Mynn.

Some sources give four of his daughters to his second wife, but others, who are probably right, give all of his children to his first wife Joan Marston, the widow of Nicholas Mynn of London and Norfolk.

Children of William Saunders and Joan (d. 31 October 1540), the eldest daughter and coheiress of William Marston of Horton, Surrey, and the widow of Nicholas Mynn of London and Norfolk

1. Marye Saunders, who married Nicholas Lusher, of Shoelands of Puttenham in Surrey
2. Nicholas Saunders ( d. 17 December 1587) of Ewell, who firstly in 1560 married Isabel Carew, the daughter Sir Nicholas Carew, and had issue, including Sir Nicholas Saunders
3. Urith Saunders (d. 27 July 1600), who married John Palgrave, of Norwood Barningham in Norfolk, and was the grandmother of Sir John Palgrave, 1st Baronet
4. Erasmus Saunders (1535–1603), fourth child, who married Janet Barrett and moved to Wales
5. Francis Saunders (d. 1613), said to have been the twin of Frances. He lived at Congham, probably with his widowed sister Frances, at the time when he wrote his will.
6. Frances (d. 15 October 1622), said to have been the twin of Francis, who married firstly Barnard Jennings of Vann, near Godalming (d.1550/1), the step-brother of Queen Katherine Howard, by licence dated 31 January 1548. He died childless only two or three years after their marriage. Frances married secondly Henry Spelman (d.1581), the son of Sir John Spelman, and had issue, including the antiquary Sir Henry Spelman and Erasmus Spelman, whose son Henry went to Virginia. Frances' second husband's first wife had been Anne Knyvett, the first cousin of Katherine Howard. Frances' first husband Barnard Jennings' mother Margaret Mundy of Markeaton, the daughter of Sir John Mundy, who married firstly Nicholas Jennings (d.1531/3), a member of the Worshipful Company of Skinners and a Sheriff and Alderman of the City of London; and secondly, as his third wife, Edmund Howard, Lord Deputy of Calais, younger son of the Duke of Norfolk, had as her third husband Henry Mannox (d.1564), Katherine Howard's music teacher in her youth, and who had been involved in sexual indiscretions with her which later contributed to her downfall
7. Katherine Saunders, who married firstly Edmund Kervill of Wiggenhall St. Mary's in Norfolk (d.1570), secondly John Spelman (d.1581), of Narborough in Norfolk (the nephew of her sister's husband), and thirdly Sir Miles Corbet (the son of John Corbet) of Sprowston in Norfolk. Katherine had issue from all of her three marriages. John Kerville (buried 29 July 1568 at Wiggenhall); Edmund (baptised 15 October 1569); Anne Kerville (baptised 9 January 1566 – buried 22 December 1602), married 27 April 1581 her step-brother Clement Spelman of Narburgh. She died s.p.; Francis (baptised 21 February 1573) and Robert (baptised 21 February 1573 – 11 January 1585, buried at Sprowston), twins; John (baptised 3 June 1572 – buried 9 August 1573); Bridget (baptised 24 April 1574) married on 12 October 1596 to Anthony Drury, son of Anthony Drury of Besthorp
8. Elizabeth Saunders, who married first Roger Castell (d. 1581), of Raveningham in Norfolk, secondly William Ford, of Hadleigh in Suffolk, and thirdly Thomas Garnish, of Horningtoft.
