= John Spelman =

John Spelman may refer to:

- Sir John Spelman (historian) (1594–1643), English historian and politician, MP for Worcester
- Sir John Spelman (judge) (died 1546), English judge
- John Spelman (MP for Castle Rising) (1606–1663), English politician

== See also ==
- John Spellman (1926–2018), American politician
