= William Yerde =

English politician (fl. 1390–1428)

William Yerde (fl. 1390–1428) was an English politician. He sat as MP for Surrey in May 1413, March 1416, 1419 and 1423.

He was possibly the son of John Yerde. By Michaelmas 1421, he married Alice and they possibly had one son.

== Political career ==
In January 1400, he was implicated in John Holland, 1st Duke of Exeter's failed rebellion against Henry IV but he escaped punishment. In January 1401, he was confirmed as an esquire of the body to Henry IV. In March 1402, he was appointed collector of customs at the Port of London. In 1408, he served as Sheriff of Surrey. In April 1416, he became attorney for John Holland, 2nd Duke of Exeter during his service in France.

In February 1421, he was appointed deputy to Huntingdon as Constable of the Tower of London. From 1421 till 1422, five prisoners escaped including John Mortimer and Thomas Payn and Yarde was accused of negligence or possible complicity. He received a royal pardon in October 1423.
