= John Bonet =

English politician

John Bonet (fl. 1385–1399) of Ockley, Surrey, was an English politician.

He was a member (MP) of the parliament of England for Guildford in 1385, February 1388, January 1397 and 1399 and for Surrey in April 1414 and May 1421.
