= William Weston I =

Member of the Parliament of England

William Weston I (c. 1351 – c. 1419) was the member of Parliament for Surrey for nearly 40 years from November 1380.
