= Vere Langford Oliver =

British surgeon and genealogist

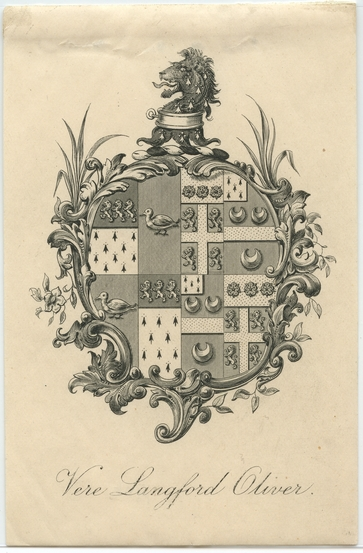
- Vere Langford Oliver coat of arms
- Born: 1861
- Died: 1942 (aged 80–81)
- Occupation: Genealogist

Vere Langford Oliver MRCS FSA (1861–1942) was a British surgeon and genealogist. He was a fellow of the Society of Antiquaries of London.

His major work was his Caribbeana published in six volumes between 1909 and 1919.

== Selected publications ==
- The Monumental Inscriptions in the Churches and Churchyards of the Island of Barbados, British West Indies
- The Registers of St. Thomas, Middle Island, St. Kitts: Baptisms, 1729 to 1814; Marriages, 1729 to 1832; Burials, 1729 to 1802
- The History of the Island of Antigua, One of the Leeward Caribbees in the West Indies, from the First Settlement in 1635 to the Present Time
- Caribbeana: Being miscellaneous papers relating to the history, genealogy, topography, and antiquities of the British West Indies. Six vols. Mitchell Hughes & Clarke, London, 1909–19.
