= Mary Jenkinson, Countess of Liverpool =

Second wife of Prime Minister Lord Liverpool

The Right Honourable The Countess of Liverpool
- Born: Mary Chester; 24 June 1777
- Died: 18 October 1846 (aged 69); Kingston upon Thames, England
- Known for: Spouse of the prime minister of the United Kingdom (1822–1827)
- Spouse: Robert Jenkinson, 2nd Earl of Liverpool (m. 1822; died 1828)
- Parents: Charles Chester (father); Catherine Legge (mother)

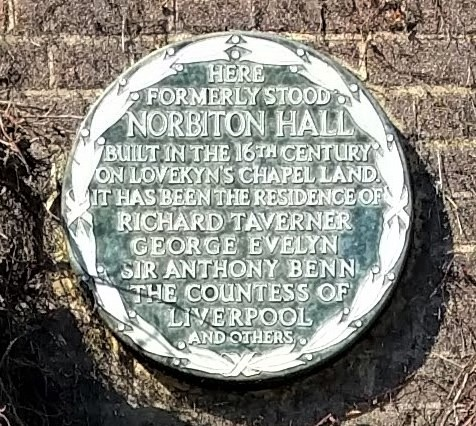
Plaque on wall of Norbiton House, 1930s flats built on the site of Norbiton Hall, Kingston upon Thames.

Mary Jenkinson, Countess of Liverpool (née Chester; 24 June 1777 – 18 October 1846) was the second wife of Robert Jenkinson, 2nd Earl of Liverpool who served as Prime Minister from 1812 to 1827.

== Biography ==
Mary Chester was born on 24 June 1777, the daughter of Charles Bagot Chester and Catherine Legge. She had three brothers and one sister.
Her father was the son of Sir Walter Bagot, Bt and the brother of the first Lord Bagot. Born Charles Bagot, her father took the additional surname Chester in 1755 on inheriting Chicheley Hall, Buckinghamshire from his cousin, Sir Charles Bagot Chester, Bt.
Her mother was the granddaughter of William Legge, 1st Earl of Dartmouth.

In 1815, Mary Chester was granted a grace and favour apartment at Hampton Court Palace, where her elder sister Catherine Chester had been a resident since 1808. By this time Mary had become the close friend and companion of Louisa, Countess of Liverpool, the wife of the prime minister, Robert Jenkinson, Earl of Liverpool.

Louisa died after a long illness in June 1821 aged 54. The following year, on 24 September 1822, Lord Liverpool was married to Mary Chester at Hampton Court by the Lord Bishop of London. Miss Mary Chester, aged 45 at the time, then became the Countess of Liverpool. Lord Liverpool had been grief-stricken at Louisa's death, and his re-marriage to her long-time friend was seen as proof of his need for a 'peaceful domestic refuge', with Louisa's sister, Lady Erne, describing Mary as 'a person of more than ordinary merit'.

Liverpool began to suffer from ill-health, and finally retired as prime minister in April 1827, after having a severe stroke two months earlier. After this, he and Mary remained at their country house at Coombe, Surrey. Here his conditioned remained poor, and he died on 4 December 1828 in the presence of Mary. Having died childless, he was succeeded as Earl of Liverpool by his younger half-brother Charles.

In 1829, Mary, now known as the Dowager Countess of Liverpool, bought Norbiton Hall near Kingston upon Thames from Charles Pallmer MP. Here she lived, along with Robert Henry Jenkinson, her late husband's cousin. Mary died on the 18 October 1846, aged 69 years, at Norbiton Hall. She had been suffering from heart disease for a number of years. She was buried at All Saints Church, Kingston upon Thames, on 24 October.

== Bibliography ==
- Burke's Peerage and Baronetage, 1999, 106th edition
- Burke's Peerage and Baronetage, 2003, 107th edition
- Gash, Norman (1984). Lord Liverpool: The Life and Political Career of Robert Banks Jenkinson, Second Earl of Liverpool, 1770–1828. Harvard University Press. ISBN 9780674539105.
- Gash, Norman (2004). "Jenkinson, Robert Banks, second earl of Liverpool (1770–1828)". In Matthew, Henry Colin Gray; Harrison, Brian Howard (eds.). Oxford dictionary of national biography: from the earliest times to the year 2000. Vol. 29. Oxford University Press. ISBN 978-0-19-861379-4.
- Howard, Joseph Jackson, ed. (1886). Miscellanea Genealogica et Heraldica: Volume 5. Mitchell Hughes and Clarke, London, 1886. Accessed 27 March 2020
- Law, Ernest. (1891) The History of Hampton Court Palace: Volume 3. G. Bell and Sons, London. Accessed 27 March 2020
- Malden, H.E. (ed.). A History of the County of Surrey: Volume 3. Victoria County History, London, 1911. Accessed 25 March 2020
- Petrie, Charles (1954). Lord Liverpool and His Times. J. Barrie. ISBN 9787800284403.
