= Thomas Lyfield =

English Member of Parliament

Thomas Lyfield (died 1596), of Stoke d'Abernon, Surrey, was an English Member of Parliament.

He was a Member (MP) of the Parliament of England for Boston in 1571, for Surrey in 1572, and for Reigate in 1589.

By 1562, he married Frances (died 1592), the daughter of Edmund Braye, 1st Baron Braye and they had one daughter.
