= Thomas Walsingham (c. 1526 – 1584) =

English politician

Thomas Walsingham (c. 1526 – 15 January 1584) was an English politician.

He was the only surviving son of Sir Edmund Walsingham of Scadbury, Lieutenant of the Tower and entered at Lincoln's Inn in 1542. He succeeded his father in 1550.

He was described as a "country gentleman", and was a significant landowner. As well as his main estates near Chislehurst, he had property in Cambridgeshire, Essex, Surrey and London. He was a justice of the peace for Kent from around 1559 and was appointed High Sheriff of Kent for 1563–64. He was a member of parliament (MP) for Maidstone in 1571, probably through the influence of his cousin Francis Walsingham. He was knighted at Rye in 1573, when the queen was on progress through Kent.

== Marriage and children ==
Thomas Walsingham married Dorothy Guildford (died 1584), the daughter of Sir John Guildford of Benenden, and had 5 sons and 8 daughters, including:

- Mary Walsingham, who married Sir Thomas Pelham (1550–1624)
- Anne Walsingham, who married Thomas Randolph (1523–1590)
- Guildford Walsingham, who married Mary Lennard.
- Thomas Walsingham, who married Audrey or Ethelred Shelton, and was a patron of Christopher Marlowe.

He wrote his will in October 1583 and died the following January.
