= Thomas Walsingham (died 1457) =

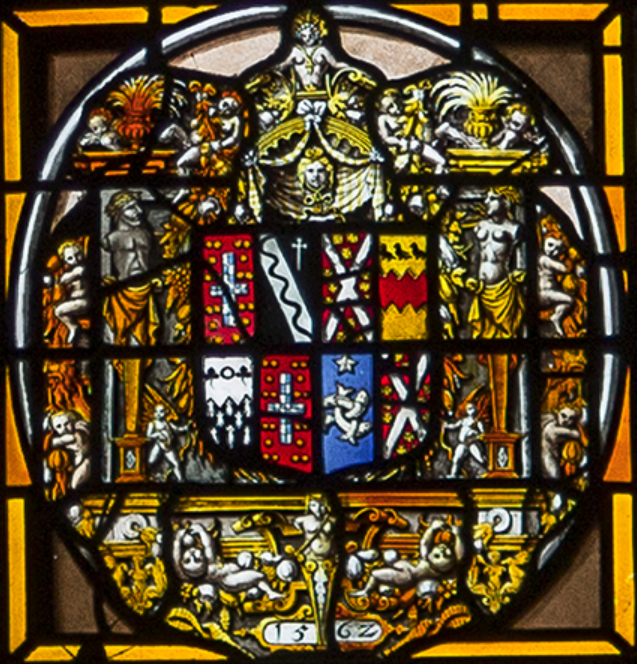
1562 stained glass in Mereworth Church in Kent, showing the arms of Walsingham (ancient) quartering Bamme, the heiress wife of William Walsingham (d.1457)

Thomas Walsingham (died 1457) was a wealthy wine and cloth merchant in the City of London who served as a Member of Parliament for Wareham in 1410 and for Lyme Regis in 1413, both in Dorset.

== Origins ==
According to Woodger (1993) Walsingham was a son of Alan Walsingham of London, a cordwainer, by his wife Juliana, of unknown family. However, according to the Heraldic Visitations of Surrey, he was the son of Thomas Walsingham by his wife Katherin Belhouse, a sister of Sir William Belhouse. The seat of the Walsingham family in Surrey is not stated. Their earliest recorded ancestor was Sir Richard Walsingham, living in the reign of King Edward I (1272-1307).

== Career ==
He was the supplier of wine to the large household of Cardinal Henry Beaufort (c. 1375–1447), Bishop of Winchester, an influential member of the royal family. He undertook some major building contracts, including glazing the eastern window of the Guildhall in the City of London and creating a conduit to transport drinking water from Paddington to Fleet Street at the western edge of the City of London. He acquired substantial estates in Kent, including the manors of Scadbury (subsequently the seat of his descendants) in the parish of Chislehurst, Champeyns and Tong, and land in Chislehurst, St. Paul's Cray, Lewisham, Bromley and Bexhill.

== Marriage and issue ==
Some time before 1412 he married Margaret Bamme (died 1445), daughter of Henry Bamme of London, a vintner. By his wife he had one son and one daughter:

- Thomas Walsingham (died 1467) who married Constance Dryland, a daughter of James Dryland of Davington. His grandson was Sir Edmund Walsingham (c. 1480–1550) of Scadbury, a soldier, Member of Parliament and Lieutenant of the Tower of London during the reign of King Henry VIII, uncle of Sir Francis Walsingham (c.1532–1590) principal secretary to Queen Elizabeth I and popularly remembered as her "spymaster".
- Philippa Walsingham, who married Thomas Ballard.
