= Scadbury Park =

Local nature reserve in London, England

Coordinates: 51.413°N 0.094°E

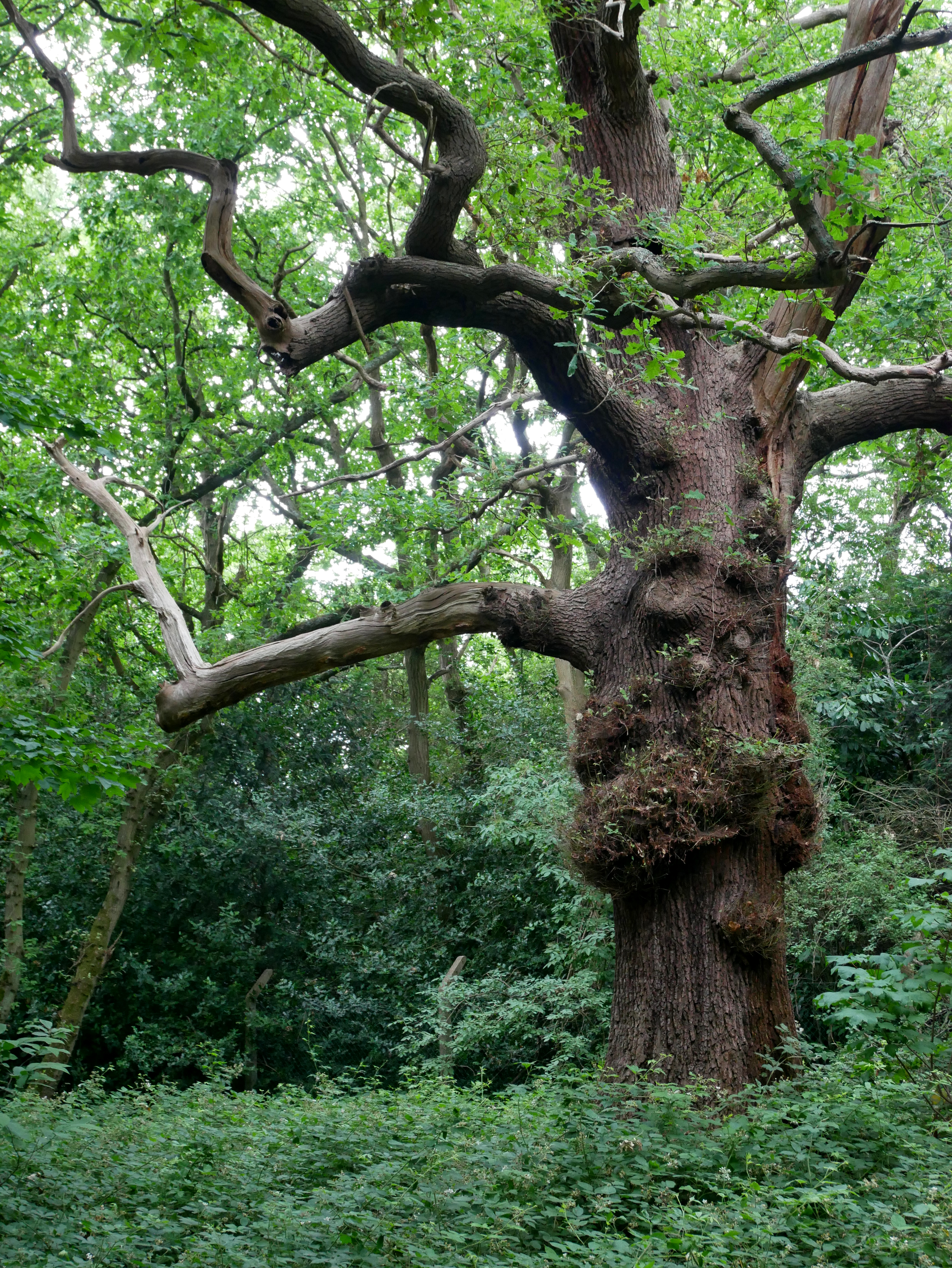
An oak tree in Scadbury Park

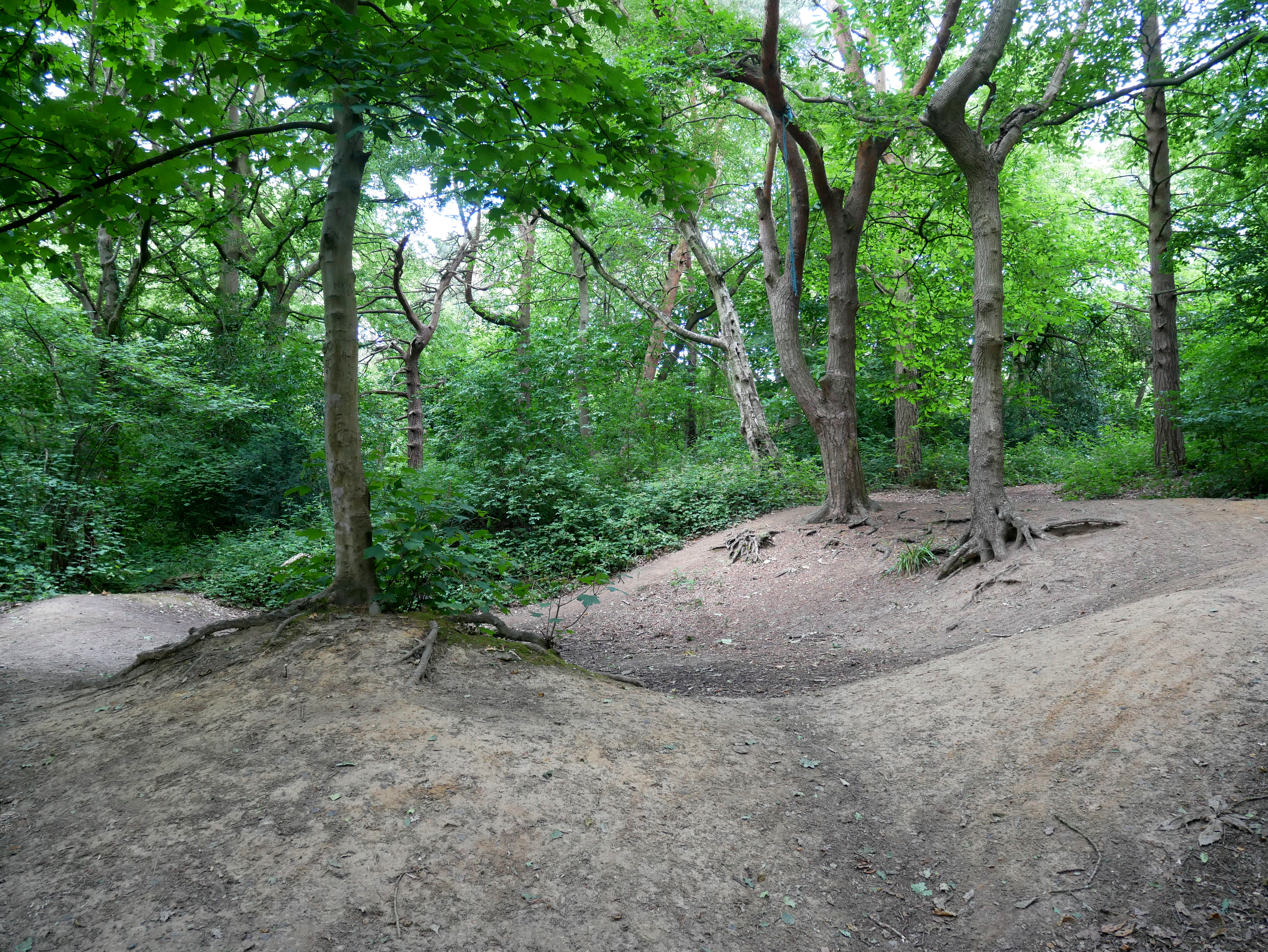
A bomb crater in Scadbury Park caused by German bombing in World War II

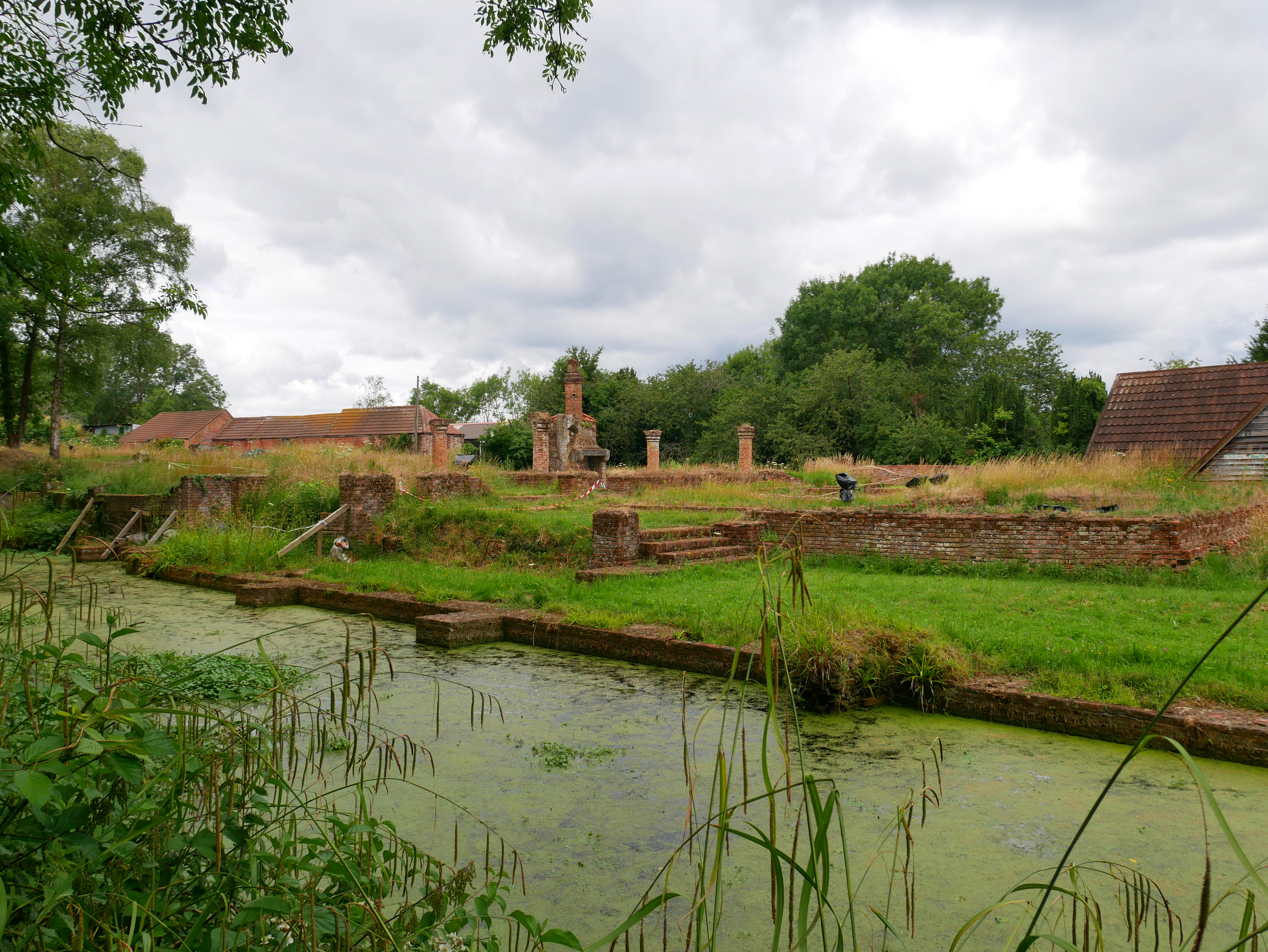
Scadbury Manor's ruins

Scadbury Park is a Local Nature Reserve in Chislehurst in the London Borough of Bromley. It is also a Site of Metropolitan Importance for Nature Conservation. It is over 300 acres (120 ha), and is part of an extensive wildlife corridor together with Petts Wood and the Jubilee Country Park.

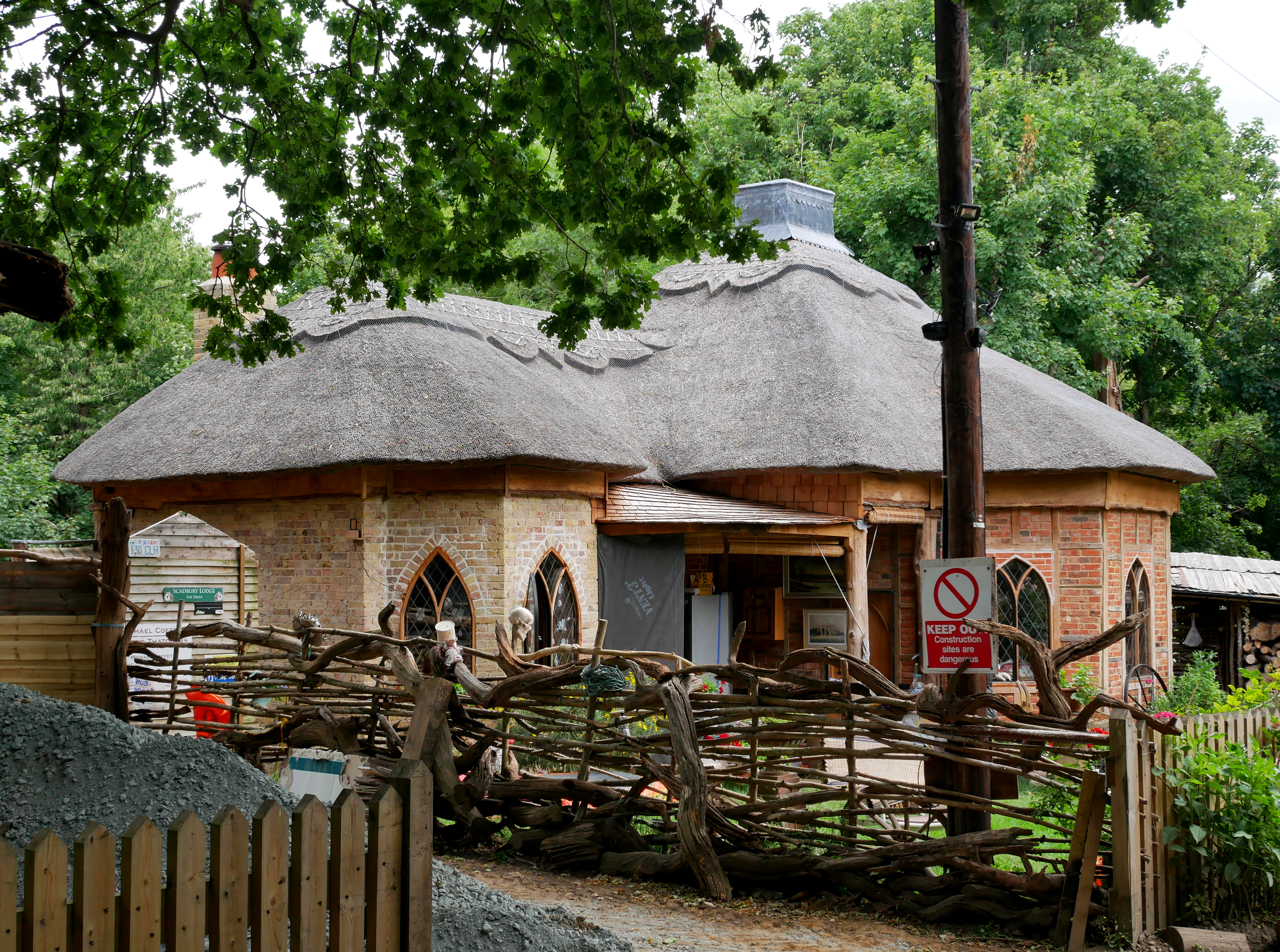
The early nineteenth-century lodge in the southwest part of Scadbury Park

It has large areas of ancient woodland, especially oaks, and flowers include lily of the valley, which is rare in London. Ponds have London's largest population of protected great crested newts. Much of it is undisturbed grassland, and it also includes a working farm.

The main entrance is in Old Perry Street. The entrance piers still exist. Also a West Lodge to the estate still exists, also on Old Perry Street. The London Loop passes through it from Sidcup By-Pass Road near its junction with Perry Street to St Paul's Cray Road.

== History ==
The manor is first recorded in the thirteenth century, when it was held by the de Scathebury family. In 1424 it was purchased by Thomas Walsingham, a wealthy wine and cloth merchant in the City of London who served as a Member of Parliament in 1410 and 1413. The manor was the seat of his descendants until about 1655. These included Christopher Marlowe's patron, Sir Thomas Walsingham; in fact Marlowe is known to have been staying at Scadbury Manor just before his violent death in 1593. Queen Elizabeth I's spymaster, Francis Walsingham, was born there.

In 1736 Col. John Selwyn purchased the property and owned it until 1742 when he passed it on to Thomas Townshend, 1st Viscount Sydney, after whom the city of Sydney, Australia was named. The manor was purchased by the London Borough of Bromley in 1983 and opened to the public in 1985.
