= Alpine route =

Difficult pass through mountain terrain

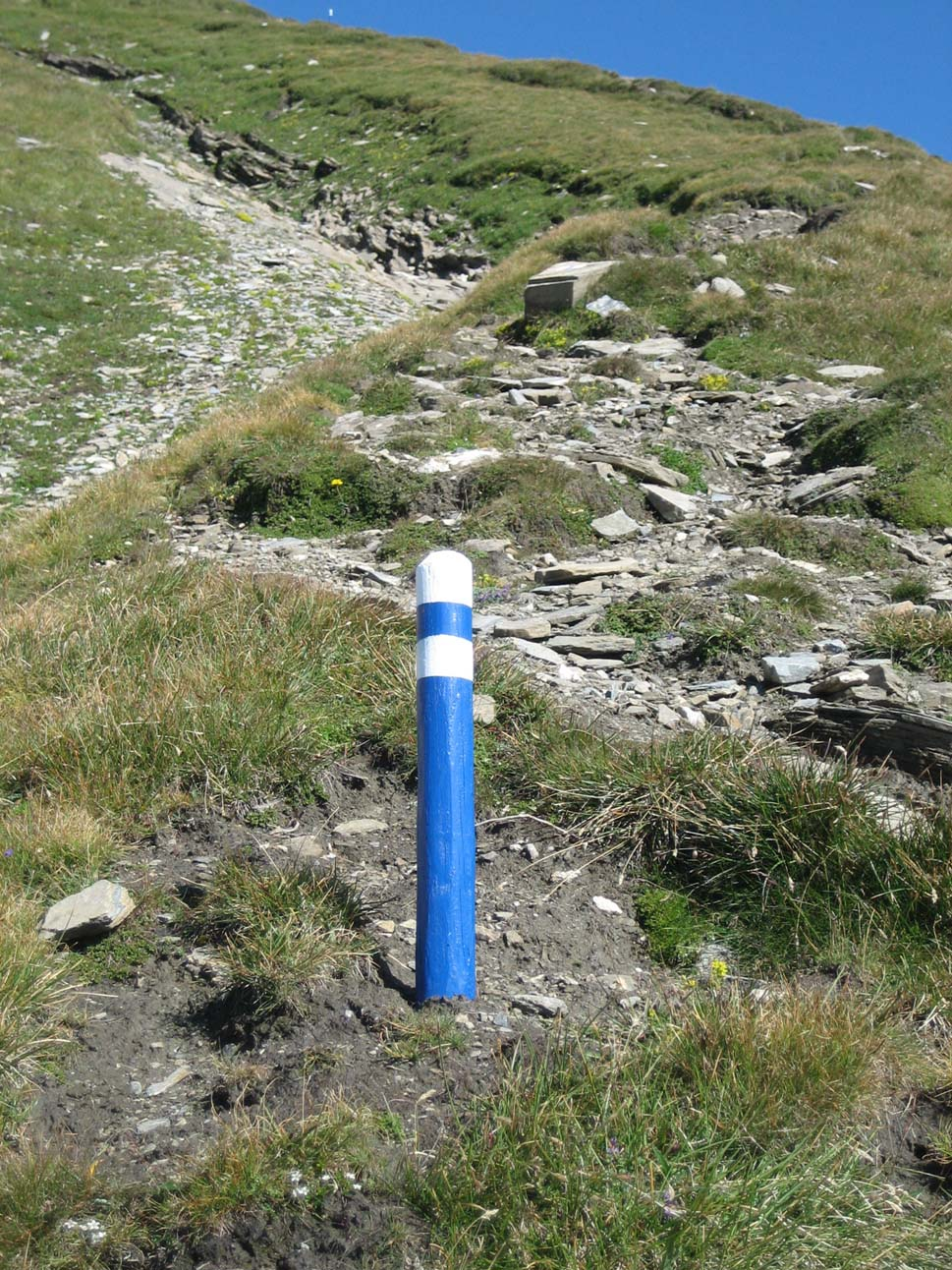
Sign on the alpine route at Piz Uccello, Switzerland

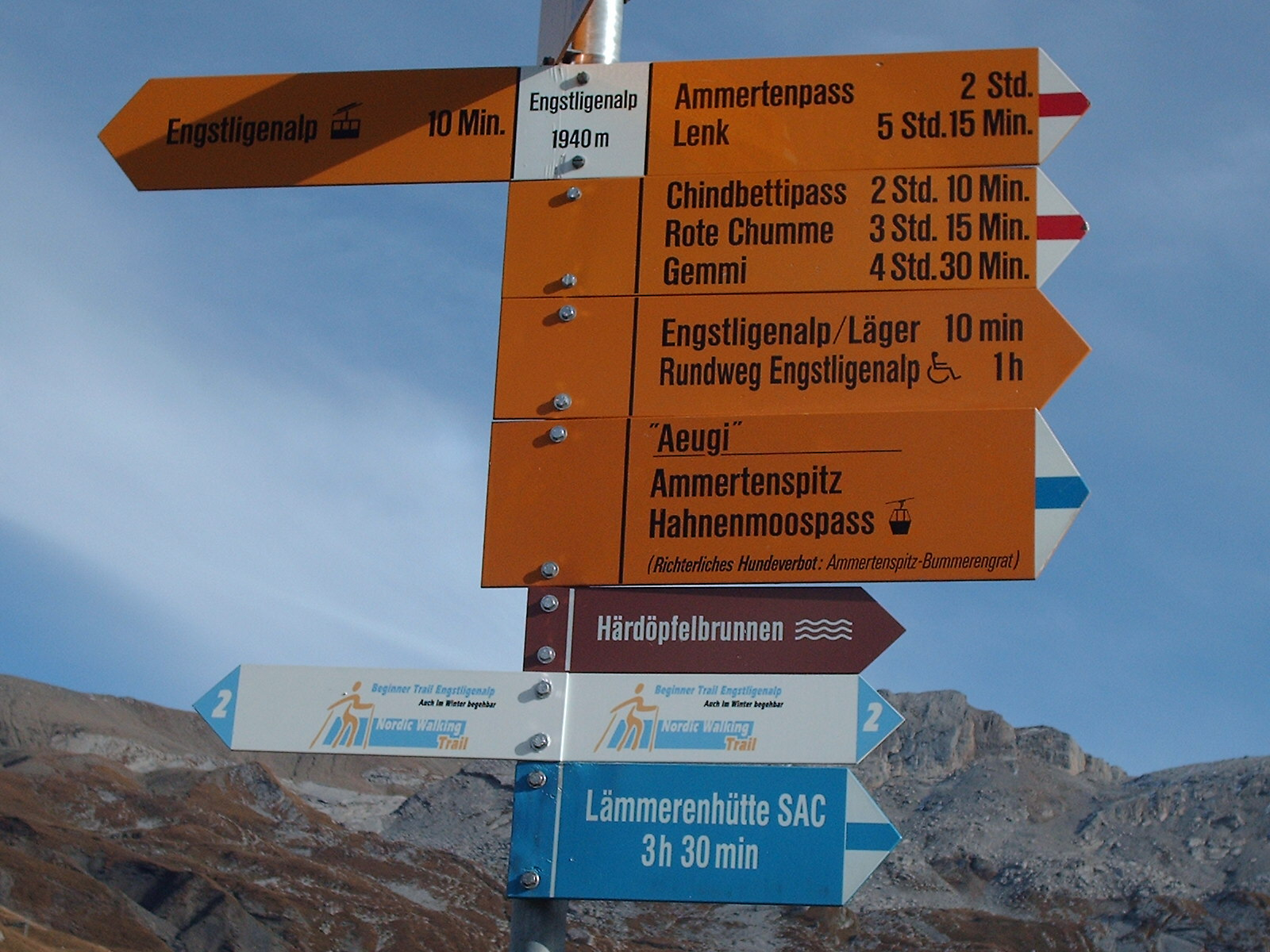
Swiss signs: hiking trails in yellow, mountain path in white-red-white, Alpine Route in white-blue-white

An alpine route (German: Alpine Routen) or high alpine route (German: Hochalpine Routen) is a trail or climbing route through difficult terrain in high mountains such as the Alps, sometimes with no obvious path. In the Alps, the various alpine clubs define and mark an alpine route, also called alpinweg or alpinwanderweg (alpine hiking trail). More generally, the term is used for routes of crossing the Alps, such as Roman crossings and Napoleon crossing the Alps. It is also used to describe routes (trails, roads, and railroads) in other mountains with alpine conditions.

== Description ==
Alpine routes are typically neither built nor maintained. They grew from being used traditionally over years or decades. Occasionally, dangerous and exposed sections may be equipped with protection such as wire cables, chains, abseiling points, and bolts. This is kept to a minimum ("die absolute Ausnahme", the absolute exception), for both the preservation of the environment and to prevent liability issues for those who install the devices. Climber Paul Preuss argued in 1911 about the use of aids such as pitons on alpine routes in his essay "Artificial Aids on Alpine Routes".

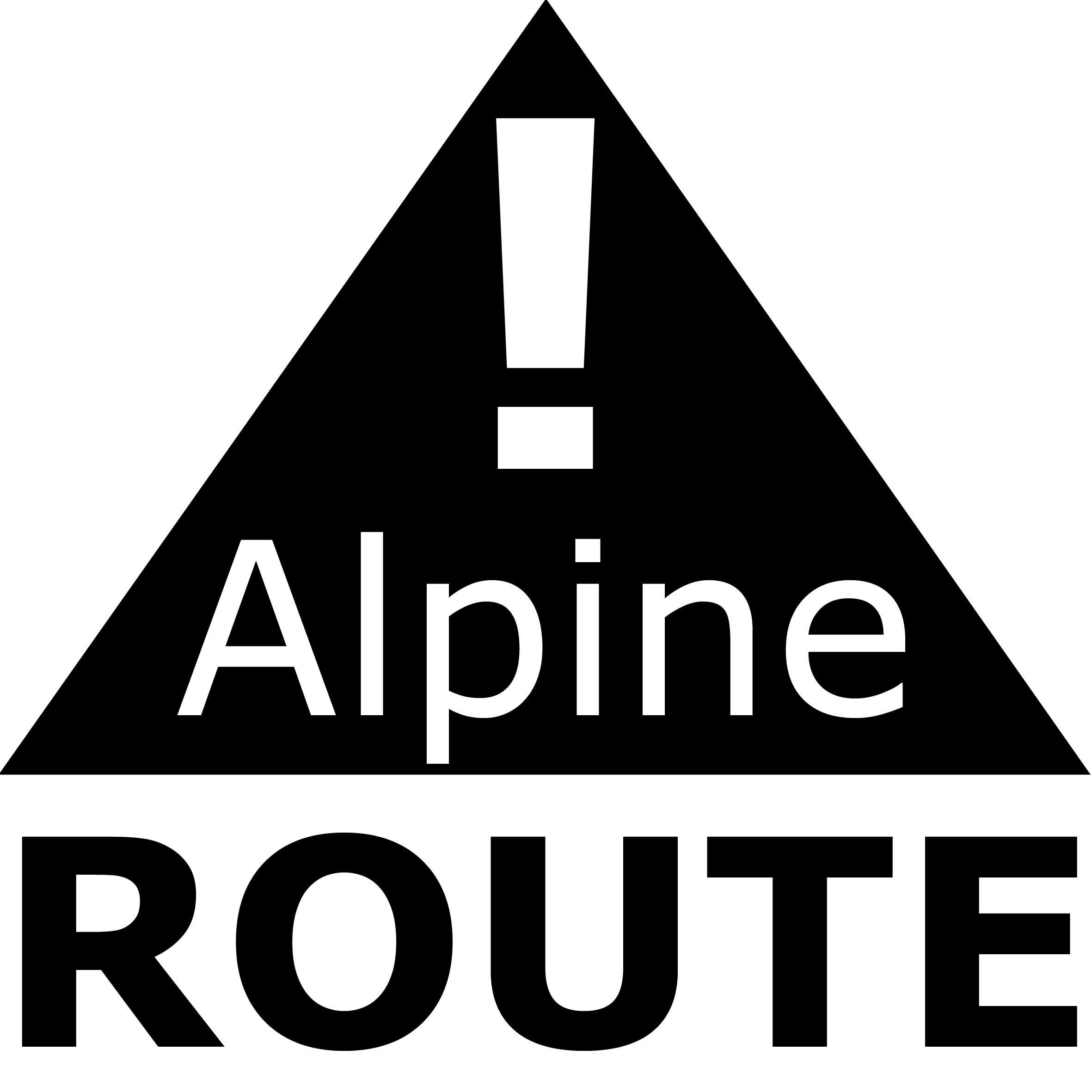
Warning marking of Alpine routes by the Alpine clubs

In the Alps, the Alpine clubs mark their designated "Alpine Routes" in blue and white. In Austria and Germany the signs are blue-white-blue, in Switzerland the signs for the so-called "Alpinwanderwege" are marked white-blue-white signs. Sometimes the routes have no signs, only cairns ("Steinmandl", little stone man) or poles marking the way. Some routes require climbing skills of minor levels of difficulty (I and II according to UIAA).

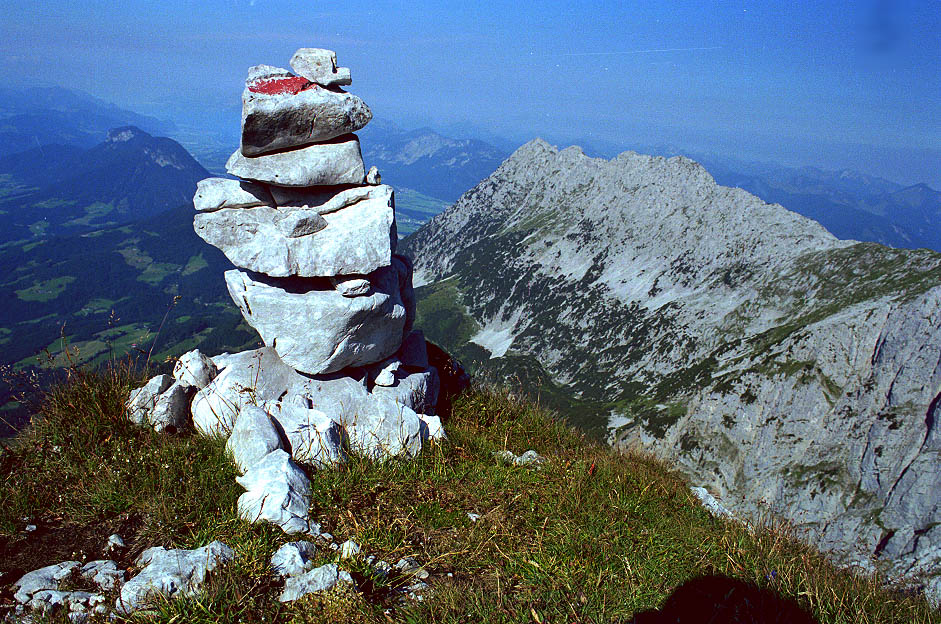
Cairn on the Treffauer

To hike Alpine routes, climbers need physical fitness, good equipment, sure-footedness, and on some routes a head for heights as well. They also need a good sense of direction, and to know how to use maps and a compass. If they do not have alpine experience, a mountain guide is advised. Some routes require climbing equipment such as ropes and ice axes, some even need crampons. It is important to check weather and route conditions beforehand.

Alpine routes are graded according to different systems. In Switzerland, an Alpinwanderweg is a marked hiking trail of the highest grade in difficulty according to the Swiss Alpine Club's hiking grades.

== History ==
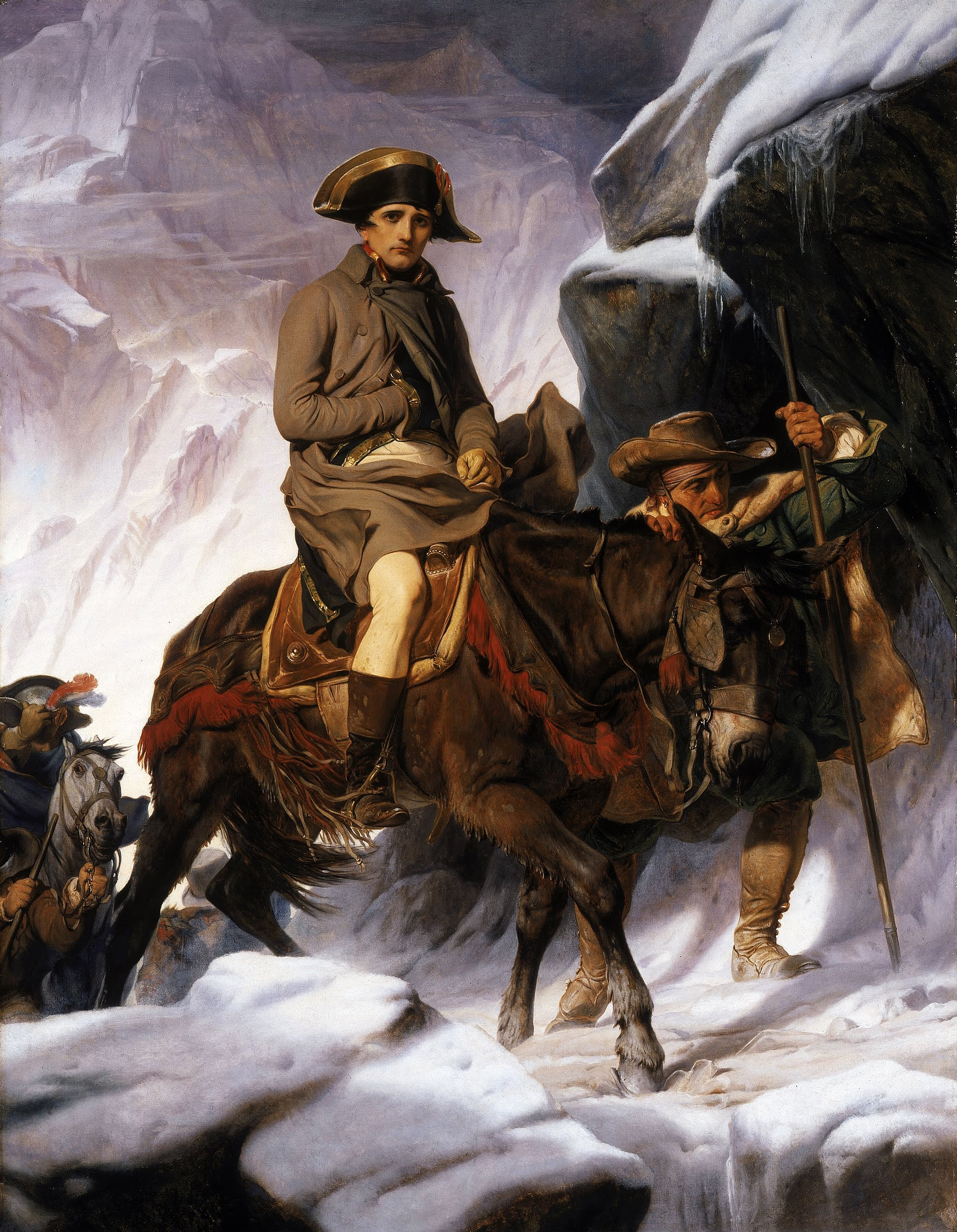
Bonaparte Crossing the Alps

The first Roman road connecting Italy with today's Germany was the Via Claudia Augusta, completed in 46–47 AD, from Verona to the Reschen Pass, the Inn valley and the Fern Pass to Augusta Vindelicorum, today Augsburg. The most ancient pass of the Western Alps is the Great St Bernard Pass, used as far back as the Bronze Age and showing traces of a Roman road. Napoleon crossed the Alps here in May 1800, depicted in an idealized view by Jacques-Louis David in Napoleon Crossing the Alps and, less idealized, by Hyppolyte Delaroche in Bonaparte Crossing the Alps.

== Notable examples ==
- Alpine Pass Route
- Garibaldi Provincial Park
- Mount Torment
- Tatoosh Range
- Valhalla Provincial Park
- Vratsata Gorge
