= Pierre Nicholas Dorsaz =

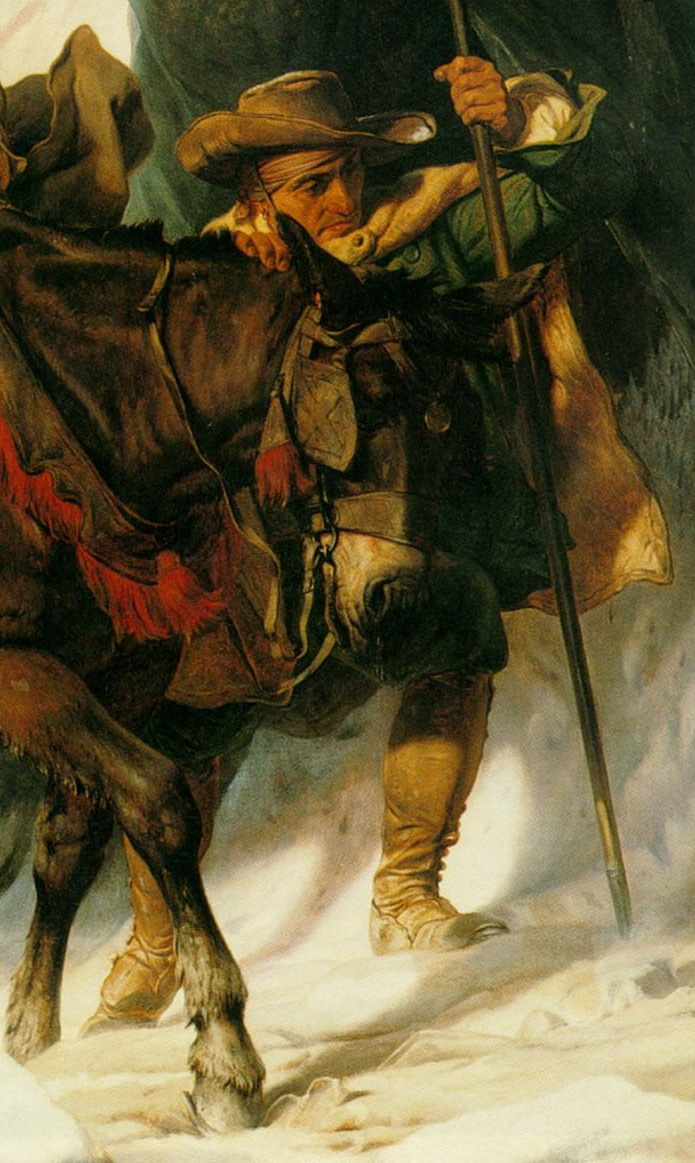
Dorsaz is seen here, leading Napoleon's mule through the Alps, in Paul Delaroche's Bonaparte Crossing the Alps

Pierre Nicholas Dorsaz (fl. 19th century), was an inhabitant of the village of Bourg-Saint-Pierre who acted as Napoleon Bonaparte's guide when he crossed the Alps in 1800, by way of the Great St Bernard Pass, as part of his plan to make an unexpected arrival in Italy, and surprise the Austrian army.

There is some difficulty in ascertaining Dorsaz's forenames. Napoleon's official correspondence refers to him as "Pierre Nicholas", but other accounts call him Jean Pierre Dorsaz and in Émile Bégin's 1853 Histoire de Napoleon he is named as Jean Baptiste Dorsaz. Bégin states Dorsaz was a relative of Jean Nicholas Dorsaz, the secretary of the commune, who related the story to Bégin in 1851.

The journey itself took place after Napoleon returned from his military campaign in Egypt at the turn of the 19th century, to find that the Austrians had been able to reconquer Italy. Napoleon's plan was to cross to Italy with his army of over forty thousand men to launch a surprise assault on the Austrian army (thirty five thousand light artillery and infantry, five thousand cavalry, not including heavy field artillery such as large cannons and baggage trains).

The journey through the Great St Bernard Pass (which was, after thorough consideration, decided to be the best possible route through the harsh Alps), commenced on the 15 May 1800 and took five days.

Initially Napoleon and Dorsaz did not converse, but shortly after they started their ascent into the mountains the mule carrying Napoleon slipped on the icy ground and almost fell over a precipice. Dorsaz, walking between the mule and the edge of the track was able to prevent Napoleon and his mount tumbling over the side and though Napoleon showed no emotion at his lucky escape, he entered into conversation with his guide. It appears that the First Consul was determined to reward his guide for his actions as he questioned Dorsaz about his life in the village and the normal recompense for the guides. Dorsaz told Napoleon that the normal fee for the guides was three francs. Bégin recounts that Dorsaz said that his dream was to have a small farm, a field and cow. Napoleon asked him how much that would cost and when Dorsaz replied it would be 60 Louis he was given the money directly, but Napoleon's correspondence shows that he ordered 1200 francs to be paid to Dorsaz on 21 October 1800 for his "zeal and devotion to his task" during the crossing of the Alps, and other sources say this money was used to purchase a house for Dorsaz in Bourg-Saint-Pierre. Local legend also credits the money with securing Dorsaz a wife, as without a house he was unable to marry the girl he was in love with.
