= Mont Mort =

Mountain in the Pennine Alps between Italy and Switzerland

- Location within Alps

Highest point
- Elevation: 2,867 m (9,406 ft)
- Prominence: 232 m (761 ft)
- Coordinates: 45°51′49″N 7°10′43″E

Geography
- Location: Valais, Switzerland; Aosta Valley, Italy
- Parent range: Pennine Alps

Mont Mort is a mountain of the Pennine Alps, located on the border between Switzerland and Italy. It is located on the main chain of the Alps, just south-east of the Great St Bernard Pass.

On the west side of the mountain is a secondary summit named Petit Mont Mort (2,809 m). The Great St Bernard Tunnel runs below it.
