= Arthur Onslow, 3rd Earl of Onslow =

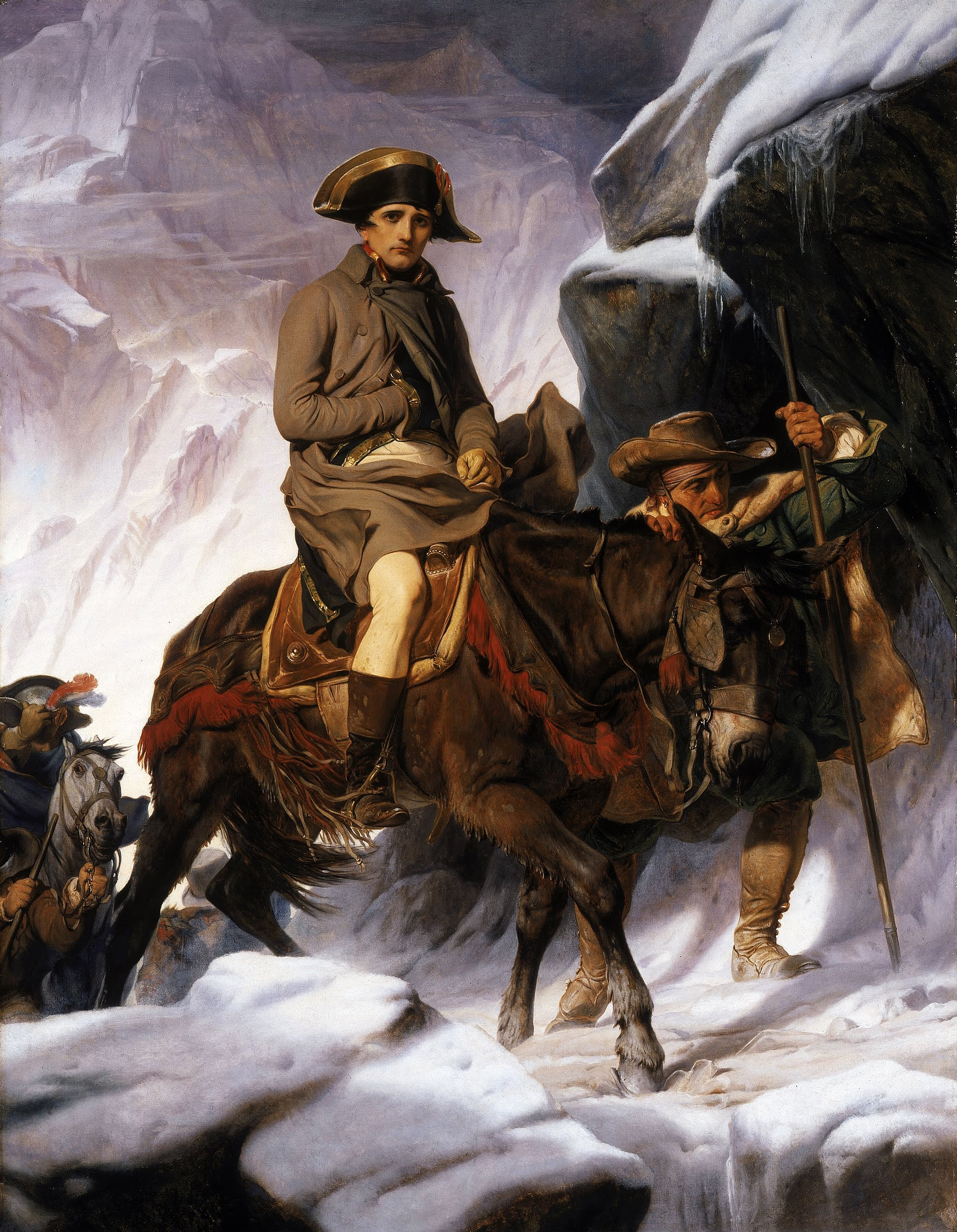
Bonaparte Crossing the Alps Paul Delaroche 1848

Arthur George Onslow, 3rd Earl of Onslow (25 October 1777-October 1870) was a British peer. He was the eldest child of the 2nd Earl and his wife Arabella Mainwaring-Ellerker (died 1782).

On 21 July 1818 he married Mary Fludyer, eldest daughter of George Fludyer of Ayston, County Rutland, esquire and of Lady Margaret Fane, daughter of the 9th Earl of Westmoreland. They had two children -

- Mary Augusta (b. 4 June 1819)
- Arthur George (16 June 1820 - 2 August 1856, predeceased), married 1 August 1850 Lady Katherine Anne Cust (born 1822), 4th daughter of John, 1st Earl Brownlow. They had 3 daughters.

The 3rd Earl's wife predeceased him on 1 March 1830. His son died without surviving male issue of his own. On the Earl's death, the Earl was succeeded by his grandnephew, William (b. 1853).

He had a large Napoleonic collection and reportedly, on visiting the Louvre with Paul Delaroche in 1848, he commented on the implausibility and theatricality of David's painting Napoleon Crossing the Alps, which had recently been reinstalled. He commissioned Delaroche to produce a more accurate version which featured Napoleon on a mule, entitled Bonaparte Crossing the Alps. Two versions survive, one at Liverpool and one at the Louvre. Elizabeth Foucart-Walker asserts that in fact the Louvre version of the ensuing work was produced first as it was already in America by 1850, when the Liverpool painting was produced. Stephen Bann suggests that Arthur George's meeting with Delaroche may have occurred, but Delaroche chose to produce two works that are almost identical and send one to America.

Peerage of the United Kingdom
| Preceded by Thomas Onslow | Earl of Onslow; 1827–1870 | Succeeded by William Onslow |
