= Great St Bernard Lake =

Mountain lake of the Pennine Alps

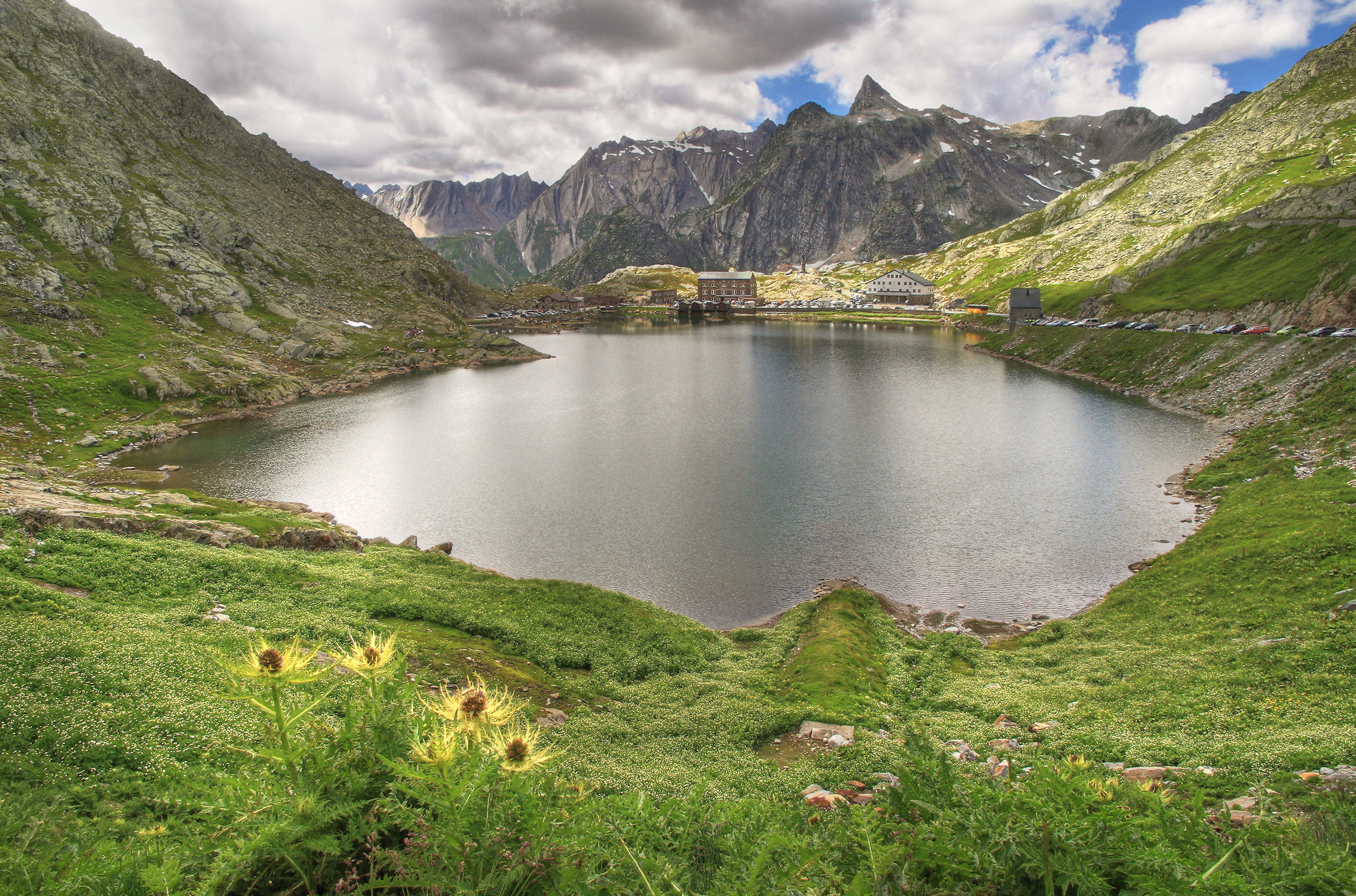
- Looking south to Italian hospice

- Location within Canton of Valais Location within Aosta Valley Location within Switzerland Location within Italy Location within Alps
- Interactive map of Great St Bernard Lake
- Location: Valais, Aosta Valley
- Coordinates: 45°52′07″N 7°10′02″E
- Primary outflows: Torrent du Grand St-Bernard
- Basin countries: Switzerland, Italy
- Surface elevation: 2,447 m (8,028 ft)

Great St Bernard Lake (French: Lac du Grand St-Bernard, Italian: Lago del Gran San Bernardo) is a mountain lake of the Pennine Alps, located south-west of Great St Bernard Pass. It is divided between Switzerland (canton of Valais) and Italy (region of Aosta Valley), although it lies south of the Alps, within the Dora Baltea basin.

The lake is located at a height of 2,447 metres above sea level and has a maximum length of 350 metres.
