= Great St Bernard Pass =

Road pass between Italy and Switzerland

- French: Col du Grand St-Bernard; Italian: Colle del Gran San Bernardo; German: Grosser Sankt Bernhard
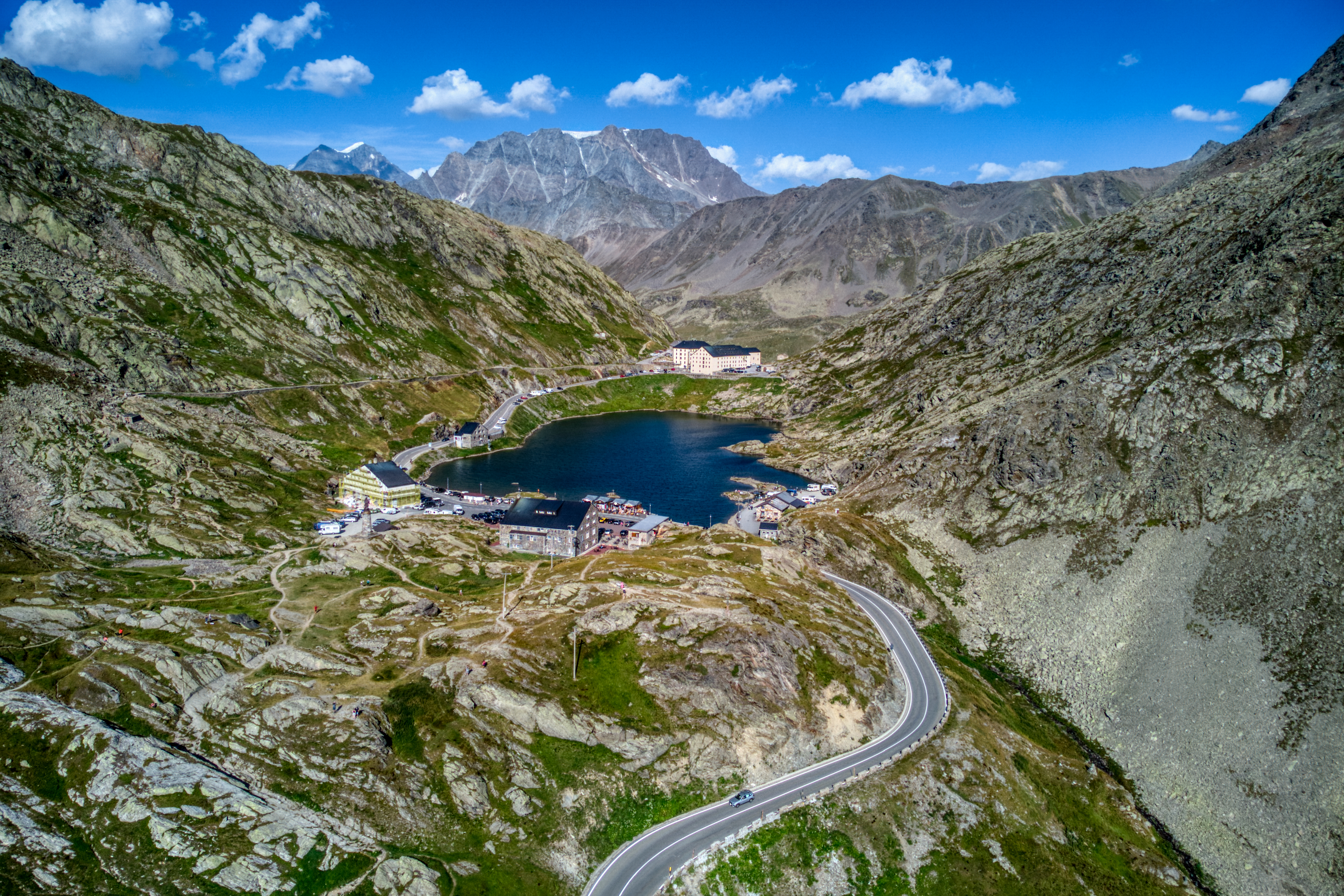
- View of the pass and hospice from Great St Bernard Lake with Mont Vélan in background

- Location within Switzerland
- Elevation: 2,469 m (8,100 ft)
- Traversed by: Rte Grand-Saint-Bernard

Location
- Location: Valais, Switzerland; Aosta Valley, Italy
- Range: Pennine Alps
- Coordinates: 45°52′08″N 7°10′14″E
- Topo map: Swiss Federal Office of Topography swisstopo

The Great St Bernard Pass (French: Col du Grand St-Bernard, Italian: Colle del Gran San Bernardo, German: Grosser Sankt Bernhard; Romansh: Pass del Grond Son Bernard) is the third highest road pass in Switzerland, at an elevation of 2,469 m (8,100 ft). It connects Martigny in the canton of Valais in Switzerland with Aosta in the region Aosta Valley in Italy. It is the lowest pass lying on the ridge between the two highest mountains of the Alps, Mont Blanc and Monte Rosa. It is located on the main watershed that separates the basin of the Rhône from that of the Po.

Great St Bernard is one of the most ancient passes through the Western Alps, with evidence of use as far back as the Bronze Age and surviving traces of a Roman road. In 1800, Napoleon's army used the pass to enter Italy, an event depicted in Jacques-Louis David's Napoleon at the Saint-Bernard Pass and Paul Delaroche's Bonaparte Crossing the Alps, both notable oil paintings. Having been bypassed by easier and more practical routes, particularly the Great St Bernard Tunnel, a road tunnel which opened in 1964, its value today is mainly historical and recreational.

Straddling the highest point of the road, the Great St Bernard Hospice was founded in 1049. The hospice later became famous for its use of St. Bernard dogs in rescue operations. The Italian side of the area includes several facilities as well. Between them is the small Great St Bernard Lake.

== Geography ==
The Great St Bernard Pass is located near the western end of the Valais Alps, the next pass to the west, Col Ferret, marking the transition with the Mont Blanc massif. In that area, between Mont Dolent and Mont Vélan, the main crest of the Alps barely reaches 3,000 metres, unlike in the much higher section of the Valais Alps east of Mont Vélan and Grand Combin. Therefore, the Great St Bernard Pass is one of the only two road axis connecting Valais with northern Italy, the other axis being the Simplon Pass.

=== Route ===
The pass runs northwest–southeast through the Valais Alps (formerly known as the Pennine Alps after the Roman name for the pass, poeninus mons or summus poeninus) at a maximum elevation of 2,469 m (8,100 ft). The road running through the pass, highway E27 in both Italy and Switzerland, joins Martigny on the upper Rhône in the canton of Valais, Switzerland, to Aosta in the Aosta Valley region of Italy. From Martigny Route 9 descends to Lausanne and from Aosta Route A5 descends to Turin.

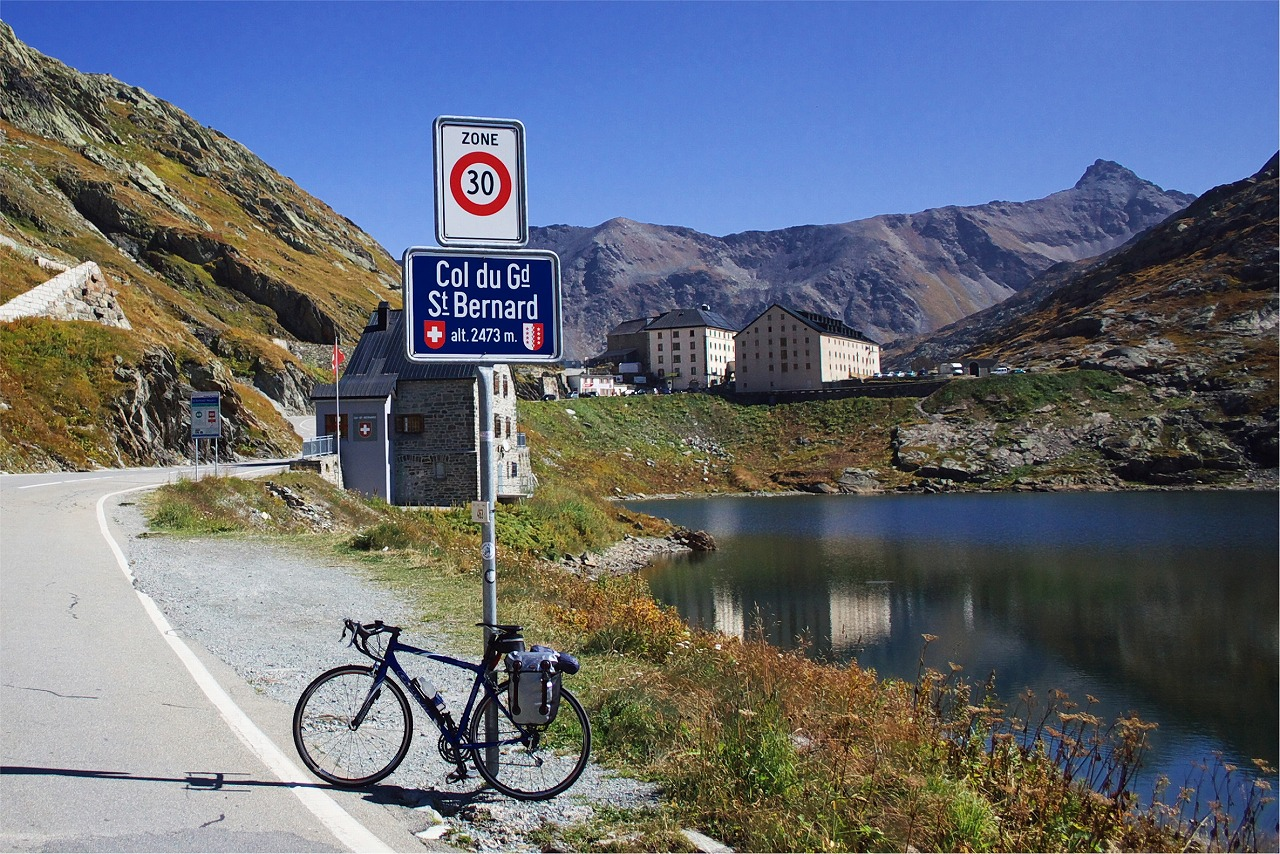
View of the pass from the international border. A Swiss Customs post is visible on the left

From the north, in Switzerland, the route to the pass follows the lower part of the river Drance above Martigny, then into the sparsely populated Val d'Entremont (lit.: "valley between mountain") through which the Drance d'Entremont flows. After having passed the last inhabited locality, Bourg-Saint-Pierre, the road runs above a large reservoir, the Lac des Toules. At the location of Bourg-Saint-Bernard, the Great St Bernard Tunnel (and the main road) plunges through the mountains at a 1,915 m (6,283 ft) level, reducing, since the tunnel's opening in 1964, the commercial relevance of the road over the pass. The summit section of the road consists of hairpin turns before it reaches the top of the pass, after having passed the Combe des Morts.

On the south side the route descends a few metres and reaches the shores of the lake before its enters Italy. Then the route follows the steep slopes of the upper part of the torrent du Grand Saint-Bernard to the south, then turns to the east and follows the river in a bend to the south, where the mountain river enters the torrent Artanavaz near Saint-Rhémy-en-Bosses and turns to the east again, then smoothly to the southeast at La Clusaz (Gignod). Here the river enters the Buthier river in the lower end of the Valpelline valley and turns south again on which end finally the river flows into the Dora Baltea near the Pont de Pierre in Aosta. The route here in the main valley of the Val d'Aoste becomes part of the A5 motorway connecting the Mont Blanc Tunnel to the west and the upper Po Basin to the southeast.

The Great St Bernard Pass on the 1:25'000 Swiss National Map

A reduction of utility began after the construction of the Simplon Tunnel, strictly a railway tunnel, 100 km (62 mi) to the east in 1905. The much smaller historic road winding over the pass itself, which lies a few hundred metres from the Swiss border with Italy, is only passable June to September.

The pass at narrowest point runs between the peaks of Grande Chenalette at 2,889 m (9,478 ft) and Mont Mort at 2,867 m (9,406 ft). Slightly to the west is Pointe de Drône at 2,949 m (9,675 ft), the highest peak. Between it and the pass is Petite Chenalette at 2,885 m (9,465 ft).

The Tour de France has visited the pass five times. It was climbed four times as a 1st category climb, and one time, in 2009, as a hors catégorie climb.

=== Climate ===
The snow in the pass in winter may be as much as 10 metres deep. The temperature may drop as low as -30 °C. The lake in the pass is frozen for 265 days per year. A summary of weather data for the year 1991-2020 is given below.

Climate data for Col du Grand-Saint-Bernard, elevation 2,472 m (8,110 ft), (1991–2020)
Month	Jan	Feb	Mar	Apr	May	Jun	Jul	Aug	Sep	Oct	Nov	Dec	Year
Mean daily maximum °C (°F)	−4.3 (24.3)	−4.7 (23.5)	−2.7 (27.1)	−0.2 (31.6)	4.2 (39.6)	9.1 (48.4)	11.8 (53.2)	11.8 (53.2)	7.6 (45.7)	3.7 (38.7)	−1.3 (29.7)	−3.5 (25.7)	2.6 (36.7)
Daily mean °C (°F)	−6.9 (19.6)	−7.4 (18.7)	−5.2 (22.6)	−2.6 (27.3)	1.5 (34.7)	5.9 (42.6)	8.4 (47.1)	8.5 (47.3)	4.6 (40.3)	1.2 (34.2)	−3.6 (25.5)	−6.0 (21.2)	−0.1 (31.8)
Mean daily minimum °C (°F)	−9.5 (14.9)	−10.0 (14.0)	−7.9 (17.8)	−5.2 (22.6)	−1.1 (30.0)	2.9 (37.2)	5.1 (41.2)	5.5 (41.9)	2.1 (35.8)	−1.2 (29.8)	−5.9 (21.4)	−8.6 (16.5)	−2.8 (27.0)
Average precipitation mm (inches)	241.8 (9.52)	190.4 (7.50)	192.3 (7.57)	204.1 (8.04)	206.9 (8.15)	145.6 (5.73)	140.0 (5.51)	135.7 (5.34)	132.8 (5.23)	194.4 (7.65)	257.6 (10.14)	243.1 (9.57)	2,284.7 (89.95)
Average precipitation days (≥ 1.0 mm)	12.9	12.1	13.3	13.7	15.4	13.2	12.7	12.5	10.7	12.2	13.6	14.2	156.5
Average relative humidity (%)	66	68	74	80	82	78	76	76	79	76	75	68	75
Mean monthly sunshine hours	54.9	103.3	157.6	148.6	158.0	188.7	211.8	201.9	160.2	123.7	62.4	24.0	1,595.1
Percentage possible sunshine	19	30	40	45	44	49	53	53	45	30	19	18	40
Source 1: NOAA
Source 2: MeteoSwiss

=== Ecology ===
The pass is well above the tree line. All the wood required for construction and firewood must be hauled in from some distance. On the south-west side of the pass is a small tarn, the Great St Bernard Lake, which captures melt water and does not support fish, even though attempts have been made to stock it. In past years the tarn has not always thawed completely in summer.

Alpine flowers are abundant in the vicinity: Gentiana clusii, Ranunculus glacialis, Dryas octopetala, Forget-me-not, Saxifraga oppositifolia among many hundreds more. Moss is prolific and the rocks are lichen-covered.

== The hospice and the dogs ==
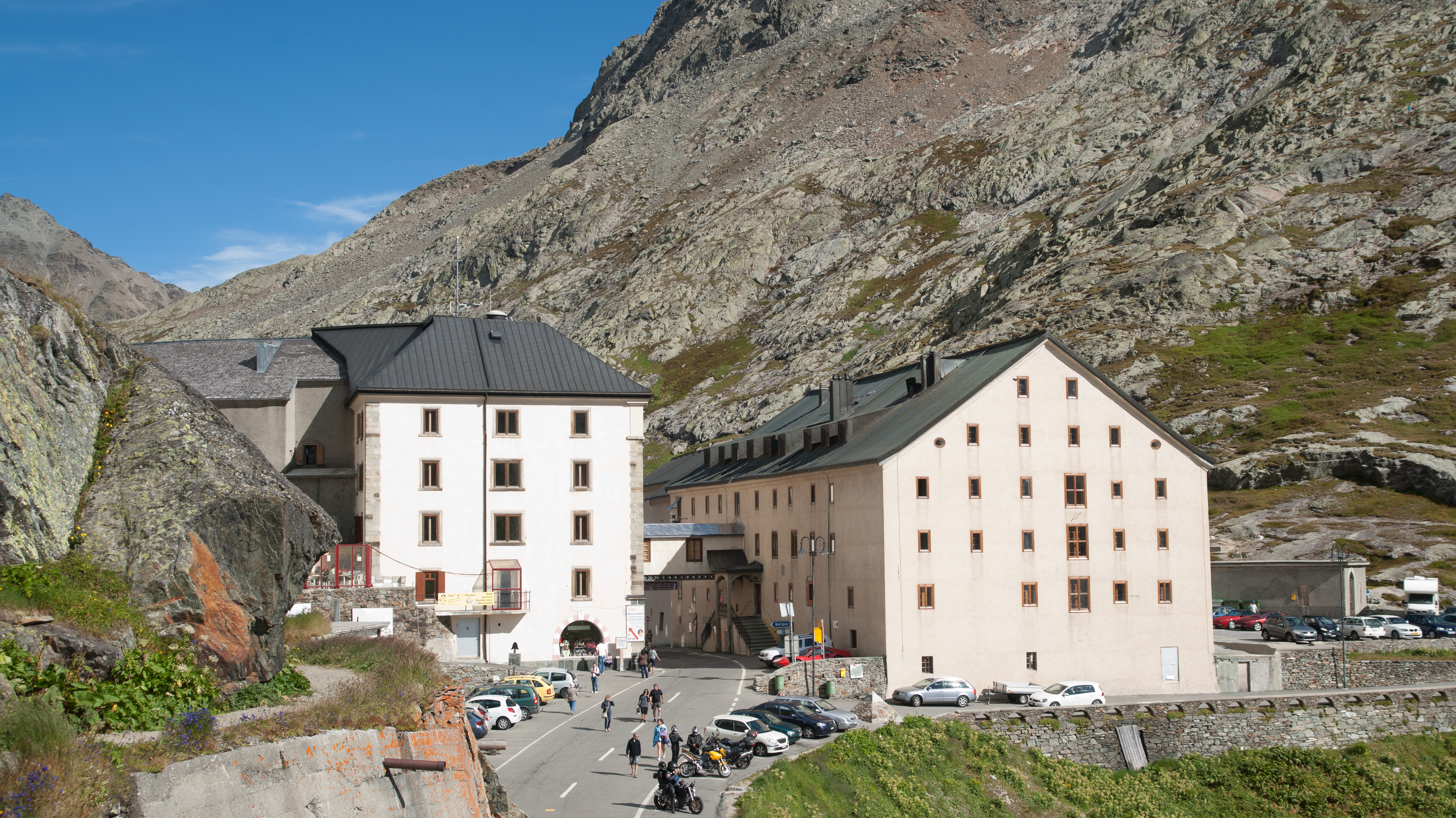
Great St Bernard Hospice at the top of the Great St Bernard Pass, occupying both sides of the modern road. The old Roman road, serving as hiking path, is visible on the left.

A hospice for travellers was founded in 1049 by Saint Bernard of Menthon and came to be named after him in the 16th century, along with the pass. It was not the first hospice in the pass. Buildings were probably there since the Roman times, but the region was not secure and they were destroyed many times. The first concern of the founder of the current monastery was to clear the region of bandits and keep the pass safe for travellers, the role of rescuers developing naturally. The hospice later became famous for its use of St Bernard dogs in rescue operations. Pope Pius XI confirmed Bernard as patron saint of the Alps in 1923.

The hospice straddles the highest point of the road, which is in Switzerland. Today the modern road for through traffic has been routed around the outside of the monastery buildings to allow some integrity of the grounds. The old road may still be seen, above the paved road. The hospice occupies two buildings, of 1560 and 1898 (picture, above). The Congregation of Canons of the Great Saint Bernard (the monks) also owns the Hôtel de l'Hospice du Grand-St-Bernard, a four-storey building made of grey stone (built in 1899) on the Italian side, which it leases to a private entrepreneur for the provision of hotel services.

The St Bernards were bred large enough to traverse deep snow and to find lost persons by scent. The first evidence that the dogs were in use at the monastery is two paintings dating to 1690 by Salvator Rosa. It is often said that they carried small casks of brandy around their necks (although this is only legend), in the belief that the liquor had medicinal properties.

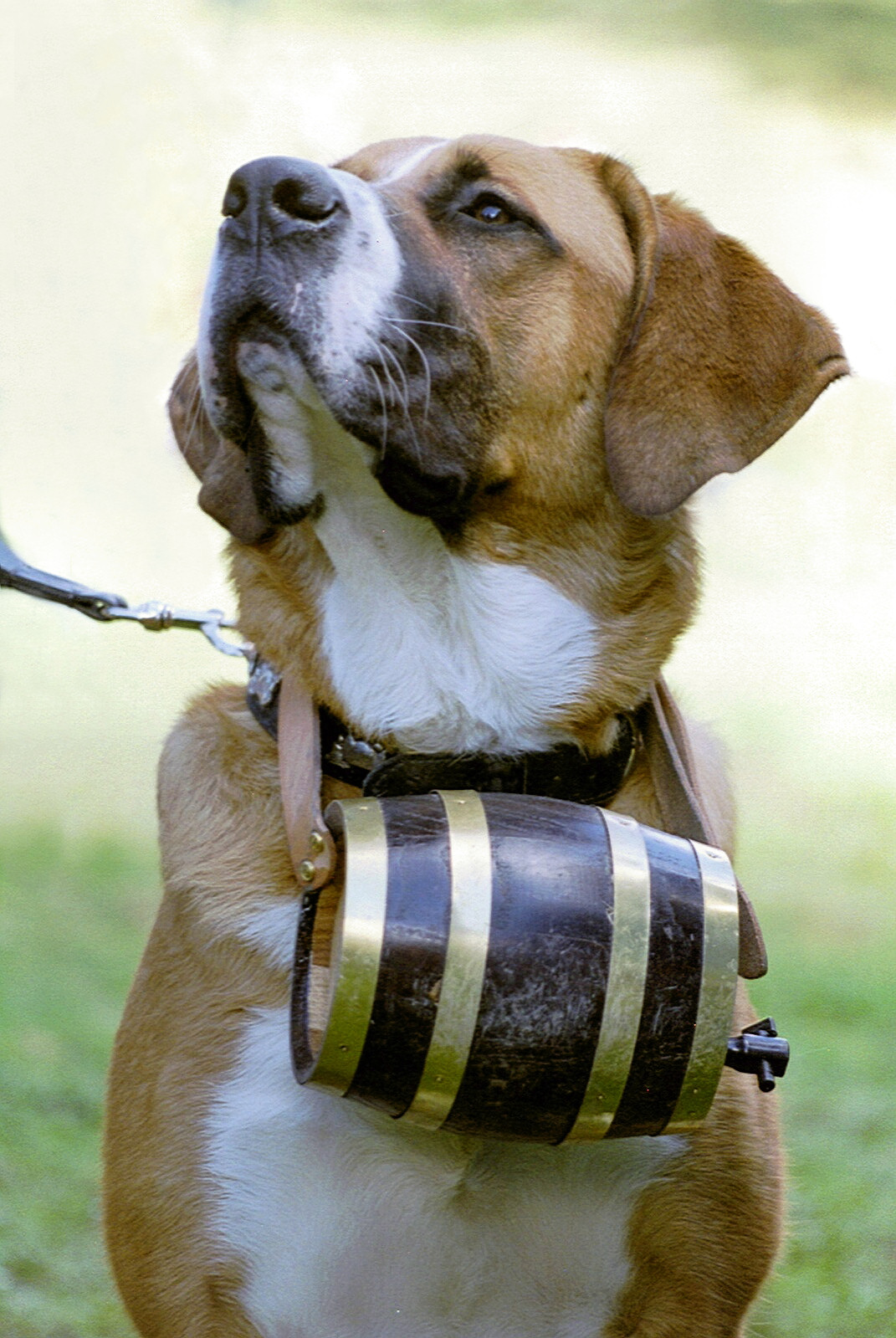
St Bernard dog with barrel

A description of an overnight stay at the monastery in 1857 was given by Theodore Nielsen, a Danish kleinsmith journeyman, in his memoirs:

"In the evening we reached the monastery of St Bernard on the top of the mountain. Enormous sums of money were expended to build these cloisters that were made of stonework and were placed there to give sustenance to travellers on the Alps between Italy and Switzerland. We came into a large hall where several other wanderers were seated. The monks came to shake hands with us and bid us welcome. A doctor – also a monk – asked if we had suffered any mishap coming up. The ones that had gotten hurt were treated and taken care of. They had an apothecary there also to administer to any one needing such. Another monk gave us a bowl with hot bouillon mixed with wine to warm us. We sat on wooden benches and talked with the rest of the people. There was a large stove and the place was lovely and warm. Some of the large St Bernard dogs were about and when we sat down came over to give our hands a lick just as if they wanted to say Hello too. At dinnertime we were given a piece of meat on a wooden trivet, bread and wine. The bread was so hard that it seemed we tried to bite into a piece of wood. Later we were shown into a room with good beds already made up. As we came from the warmth of the hall into the cold room we started to shiver and just couldn't get warm, so we didn't get much sleep. My turtle was cold, too, so I took it to bed with me to try to warm it a bit. We arose at five the next morning and were given a very good and generous breakfast before we started our descent of the mountain. The clouds were threatening, black and so heavy that we could see nothing and wished earnestly that we were back onto the green earth once more. It was hard work going up the mountain but worse going down. We sank into the snow, several times so deep that we had all we could do to get up again. I had expected to see some of the dogs, but we were following the wooden markers and the dogs are trained to go afield and search for the ones that missed the markers. It is impossible to find the way over the mountain without help. The large dogs searched in pairs - one has a wooden keg fastened under his chin. When they locate a victim he is offered the wine to keep him alive while the other dog runs back to the monastery to lead the monks who transport the lost back. Sometimes the lost are no longer alive."

Today the tunnel and modern technology have made rescue operations at the pass mainly unnecessary. The dogs were put up for sale in 2004 because of the high cost of maintenance and were promptly bought by two foundations created for the purpose: Fondation Barry du Grand Saint Bernard (major contributor Christine Cerletti-Sarasin) and Fondation Bernard et Caroline de Watteville. Barry bought the kennels and the facilities in Martigny and continues to support and breed the dogs (three or four dozen). One condition of the sale is that they be brought to the monastery for the summer. Travellers are likely to see them romping around the slopes. The de Watteville Foundation keeps several dogs in kennels adjunct to its Musée. Both have agreed to work together and others have joined the partnership.

The monastery currently houses a handful of monks on a permanent basis, and serves as a spiritual centre for others on retreat.

== History ==
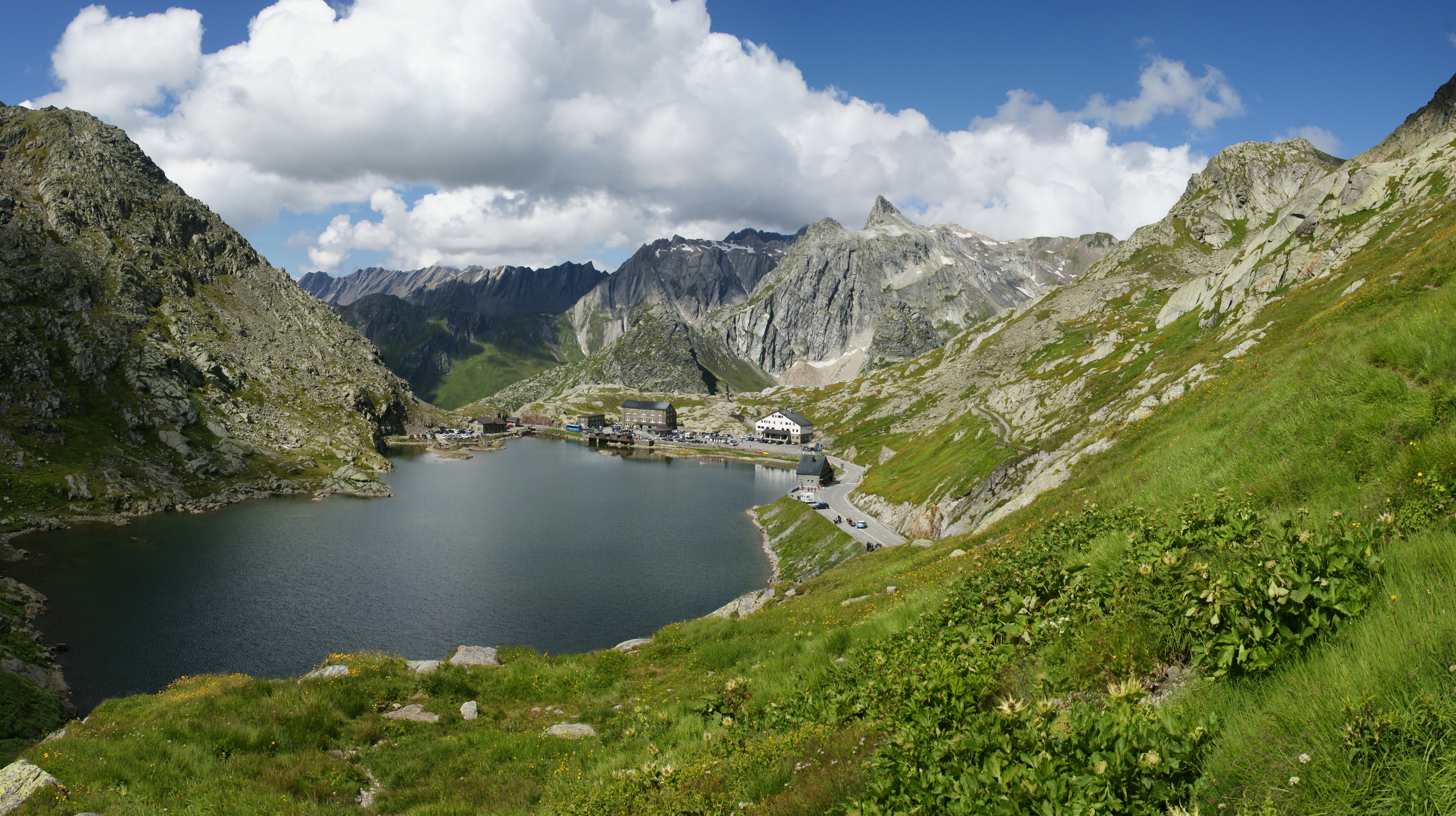
View toward the Italian side from the monastery. Beyond the buildings at the end of the lake the road drops sharply. On the hillside above the modern road can be seen the Roman road.

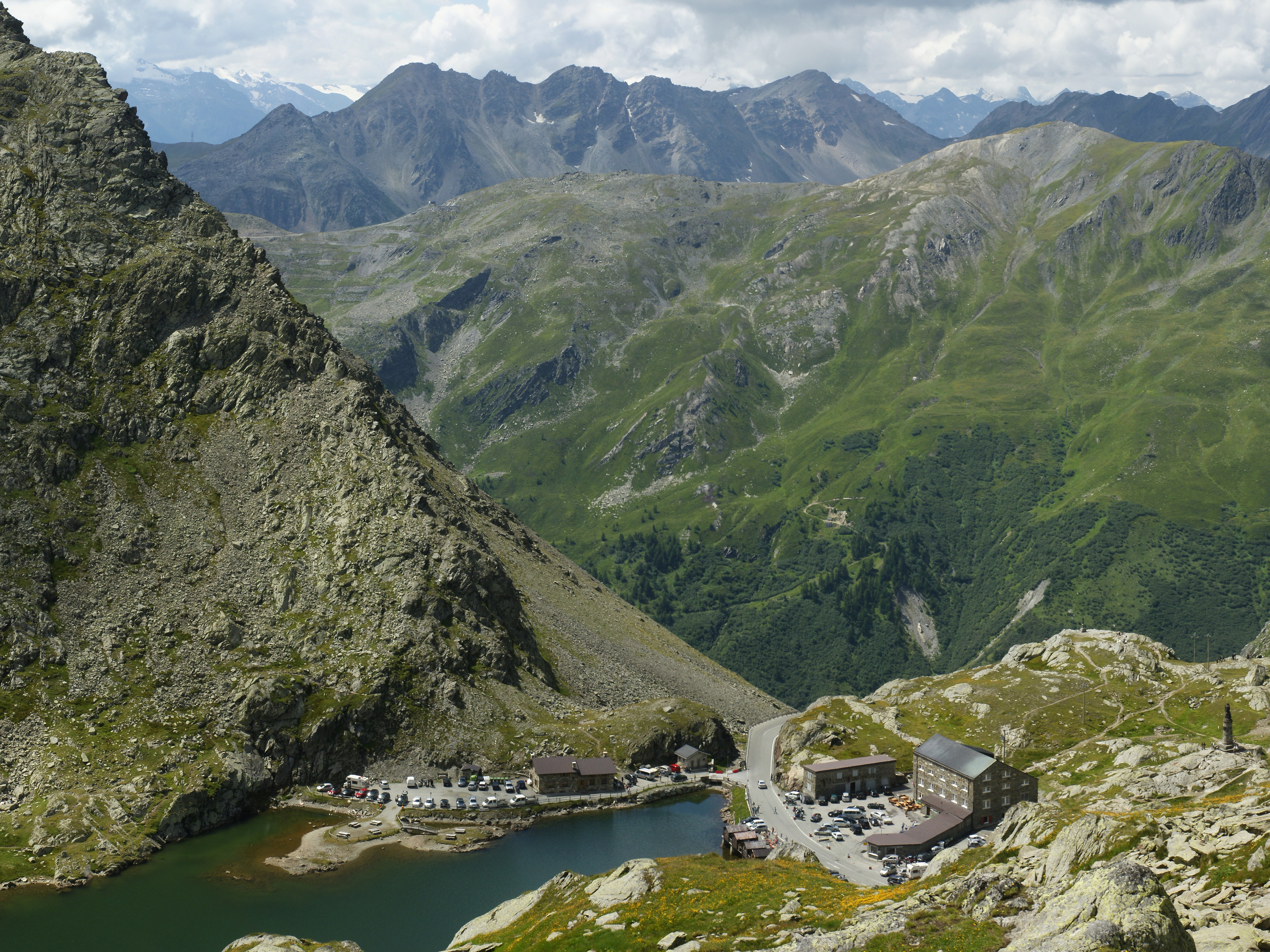
View into Italy from above the Roman road. The statue of Saint Bernard is visible at the far right. The cross on the Plan de Jupiter is visible on the knoll above the hotel. The mountains in the background are the Mont Blanc, and the Ruitor massifs.

=== Celtic period ===
The pass first appears in history as the route taken by the Celtic tribes of the Boii and Lingones in the invasion of Italy of 390 BC. The classical authors first mentioning the pass in that or other contexts lived the 1st century BC under the early Roman Empire. They were calling the pass and the mountains Poeninus or Poenini, "Punic", an apparent reference to Hannibal's crossing, however it carried the name of a Celtic deity of mountain passes worshipped in Northern Italy called in fact Poeninus. Hannibal did not cross there, in fact. On the presumption that the name was falsely altered by analogy, it can be reconstructed to *peninus, a Roman-Celtic word, considering that Celtic tribes owned the entire pass until defeated by the Romans. Livy says that the pass was not named after the Carthaginians but after a mountain god. For well over a century scholars such as the Grimm brothers have made a connection with continental Celtic pen or ben, "head, summit, chief" on an analogy with the Zeus karaios of Hesychius.

Two tribes occupied the valleys on either side of the pass on a permanent basis: the Veragri on the Swiss side and the Salassi on the Italian side.

=== Roman period ===
Julius Caesar sent an expedition under his best commander, Servius Galba, from Gaul in 57 BC to seize the pass, hoping to obtain a shorter route between Italy and Gaul than the contemporaneous coastal route. Galba was deceived by the Veragri into making camp near Martigny with the expectation of moving into the pass on the next day. At that time the Romans found the heights over the trail occupied by three hostile Gallic tribes. The Romans won a local victory by a daring foray from the camp but Galba judged he could not take the pass and departed.

Augustus succeeded where his adoptive father failed and the pass became Roman. Augustus placed a large castra stativa and colony, Augusta Praetoria Salassorum, below the pass, which became Aosta (contraction of Augusta). Its ruins are a historic attraction there. By 43 AD under the emperor Claudius a good Roman road through the pass was completed with a mansio at the top and a temple to Jupiter Poeninus, resulting in the name Mons Jovis in late antiquity, Monte Jove in the early Italian period and Mont Joux in the French period, a synonym for the pass. The site of the temple is known as the Plan de Jupiter, located on a knoll on the Italian side of the pass. A cross was placed there in 1816 bearing the inscription Deo optimo maximo, "to the best and greatest god." The bronze statue of St Bernard on a pedestal above the road on the Italian side, across a small valley from the cross, was constructed in 1905 on the site of the Roman mansio.

The coins and votive tablets found at the site of the temple roughly date the upper limit of Roman control of the pass. The youngest date to the reign of Theodosius II (1st half of the 5th century). These and other artifacts are stored in the monastery museum. Fragments of the marble temple, some with inscriptions, have been incorporated into many structures of the village of Bourg-Saint-Pierre on the Swiss side of the pass. The Roman milestone for mile XXIIII was also brought to the center of the settlement from the top of the pass.

=== Napoleonic crossing ===
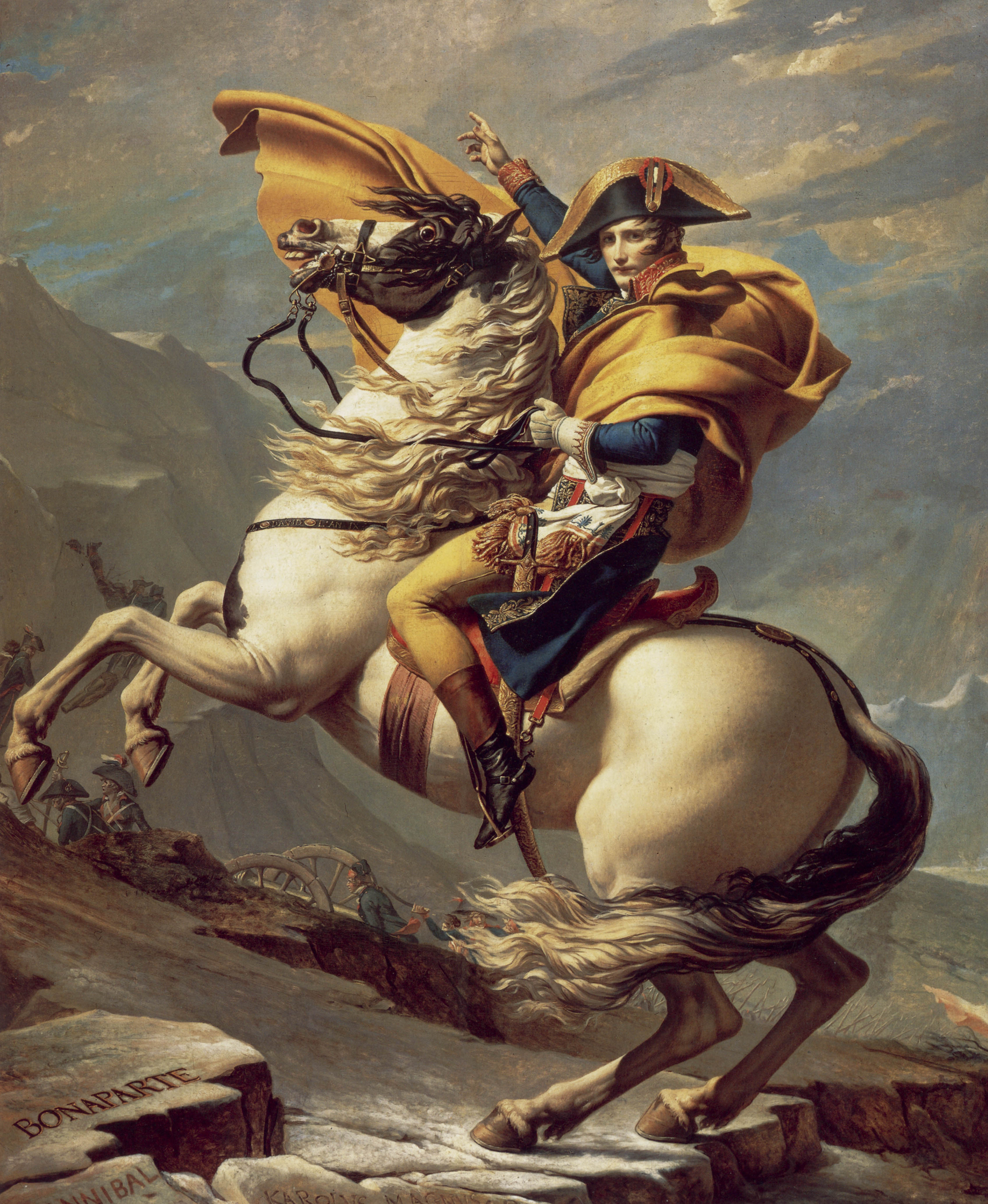
Napoleon Crossing the Alps by Jacques-Louis David, 1801. Napoleon actually crossed the pass on a mule, not on a horse.

The pass had entered history with the Gallic invasion of 390 BC. The last Gallic invasion over it occurred in May, 1800, under the direction of the 30-year-old First Consul of the French Republic, Napoleon Bonaparte. An Austrian army of 140,000 men had laid siege to French-occupied Genoa on the west coast of northern Italy. Napoleon traversed the pass with 40,000 men and ⅓ of their heavy artillery, sending another 20,000 over three other passes as a diversion, intending to strike the Austrian rear. The panicked Austrians were unable to assemble fast enough to meet the French en masse but rather in a piecemeal way in June 1800, and so were defeated first at the Battle of Montebello and then at the Battle of Marengo.

Napoleon prepared for the march secretly by assembling men in small units below the pass, establishing supply dumps along the lower part of their route, and hiring artisans to set up shop along it as well. On May 15 an advance unit went over the pass to take Aosta, after which hospitals were set up at Martigny and Aosta. At Martigny the army assembled and received rations for three days. All the equipment - carriages, artillery, arms and ammunition - was disassembled and divided into packs of 60-70 pounds for the men to carry. The cannons were to be dragged up over the snow in hollowed-out pine half-logs by mules, and then when the mules died or were exhausted, by 100 soldiers and hired men each. Napoleon offered liberal monetary rewards to soldiers and laborers who could perform difficult portages in a timely fashion.

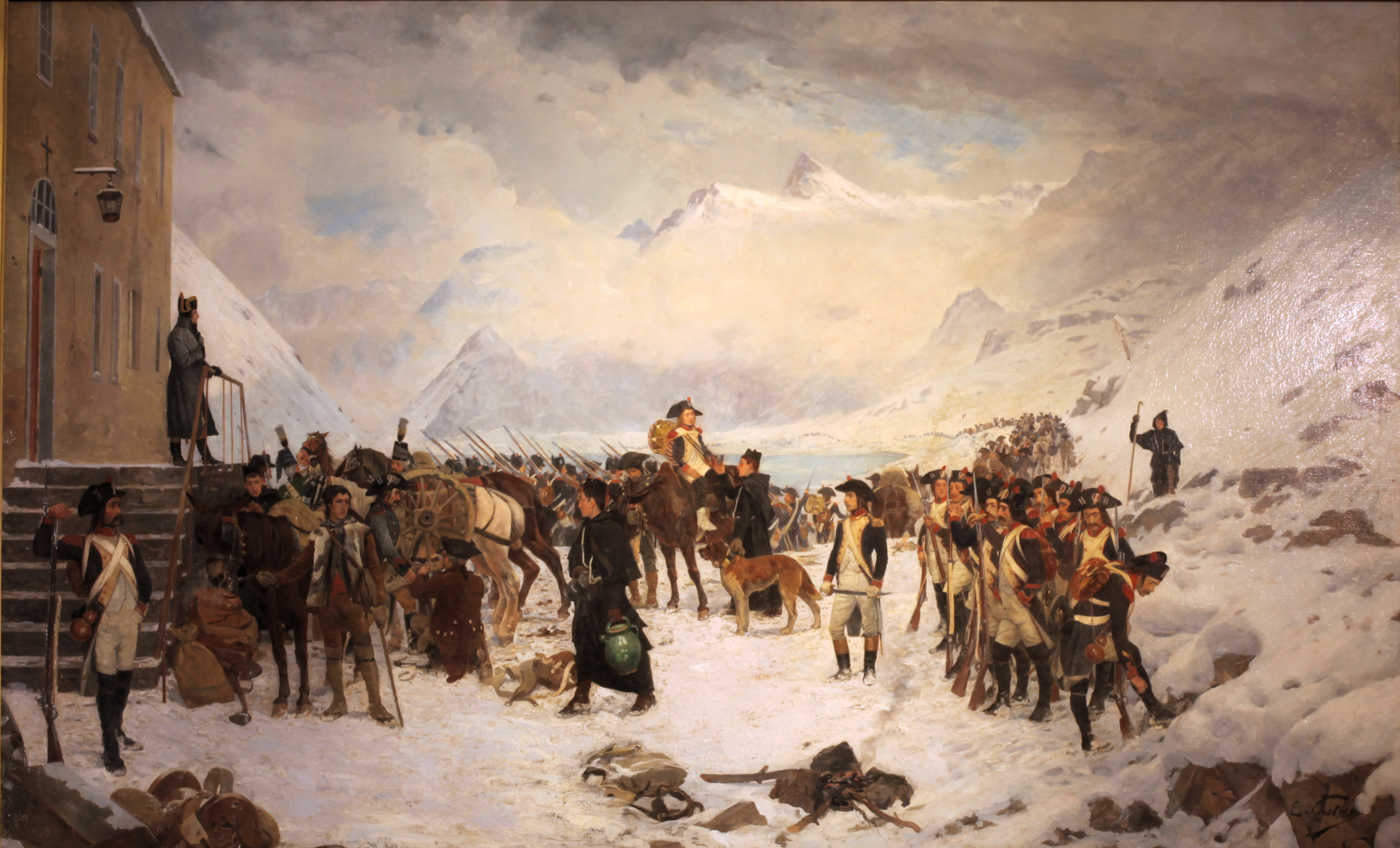
Napoleon passing the Great St Bernard Pass, by Édouard Castres

Over several days at the end of May the army went over the pass single-file, 6000 men per day. Bands played martial music along the route, with drum rolls at especially difficult places to alert the men. At the top the monks handed each man two glasses of wine and a slice of rye with cheese as they filed by (courtesy of the French army). Accounts of the amounts expended vary. On the other side the snow became so packed that the men slid down sitting. Napoleon was the last man over, sliding also. The good weather held for the entire crossing, otherwise the crossing could have easily become disastrous.

On the way up Napoleon had discussed affairs of the heart with his young guide and mule driver, Pierre Nicholas Dorsaz, who did not know his identity. Offered a reward at the top, Dorsaz asked for the mule on which Napoleon was riding. He received the mule and a short note for the chief supply officer of the army. Versions of the story vary, but they all agree that when the young man had turned in the note and had drawn his ample pay for the work, he found that his companion was Napoleon and the latter had given him a house and farm so that he could marry his sweetheart.

In the Aosta Valley Napoleon's army slipped by an Austrian garrison at Bard just out of cannon range. The commander related that he was astonished to watch an army of 40,000 men in full equipment go marching past from the direction of the heights.

== In literature ==
The Dorrit family crossed from France into Italy in Book Two: Riches of the novel Little Dorrit by Charles Dickens. They meet the newly-wed Gowans and the gentlemanly murderer Rigaud, now called Blandois, at the inn after climbing up on mules. The novel was published in 1857, but set in the mid 1820s. Dickens describes the sites of the pass, and the experience of staying overnight in the inn, having visited it in person.

== Ski resort ==
From 1963 to 2010, the Great St Bernard Pass was home to the Super St-Bernard ski resort, which operated three lifts reaching elevations up to 2,770 metres near the Swiss-Italian border.

The resort opened coinciding with the construction of the Great St Bernard Tunnel, providing year-round access to the historically significant mountain pass. Known for its reliable snowfall of 14 metres annually and challenging off-piste terrain, Super St-Bernard became a popular destination for freeriding enthusiasts, with one notable run extending across the border into Italy. Despite its reputation for excellent powder skiing, the remote location and extreme weather conditions—including frequent high winds exceeding 60 km/h—contributed to operational challenges and high maintenance costs.

The resort permanently closed in 2010 following financial difficulties and the inability to fund necessary infrastructure upgrades, becoming one of Switzerland's notable "ghost resorts" that continues to attract ski touring enthusiasts to its abandoned slopes.

== See also ==
- List of highest paved roads in Europe
- List of mountain passes
- List of the highest Swiss passes
- Little St Bernard Pass
- San Bernardino Pass
- Souvenir Henri Desgrange
