= Napoleon Crossing the Alps =

Series of paintings by Jacques-Louis David

Napoleon Crossing the Alps (also known as Napoleon at the Saint-Bernard Pass or Bonaparte Crossing the Alps; listed as Le Premier Consul franchissant les Alpes au col du Grand Saint-Bernard) is a series of five oil on canvas equestrian portraits of Napoleon Bonaparte painted by the French artist Jacques-Louis David between 1801 and 1805. Initially commissioned by the King of Spain, the composition shows a strongly idealised view of the real crossing that Napoleon and his army made along the Alps through the Great St Bernard Pass in May 1800.

It has become one of the most commonly reproduced images of Napoleon.

== Background ==
Napoleon Crossing the Alps
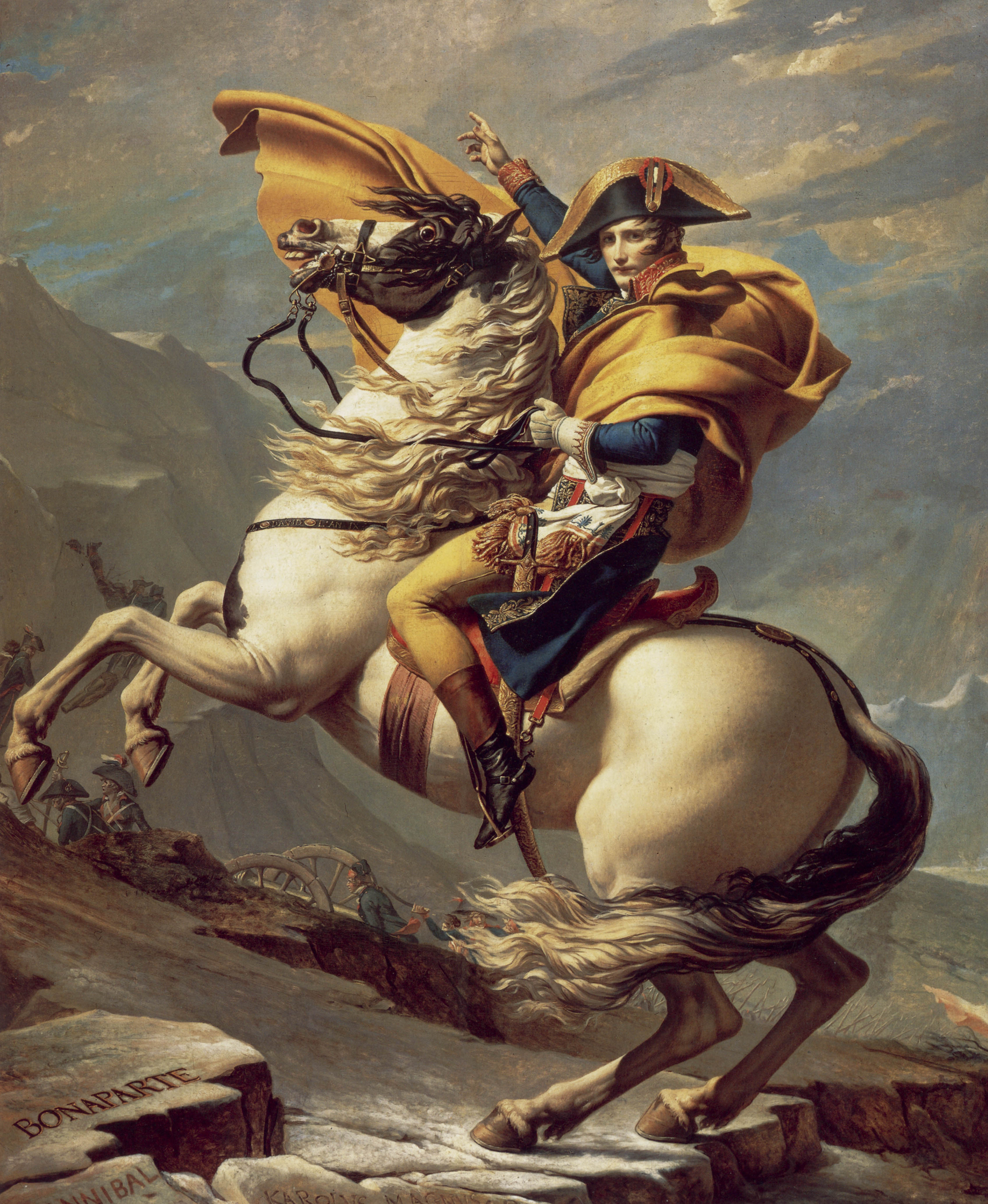
- Artist: Jacques-Louis David
- Year: 1801
- Medium: Oil on canvas
- Dimensions: 261 cm × 221 cm (102 1/3 in × 87 in)
- Location: Château de Malmaison, Rueil-Malmaison

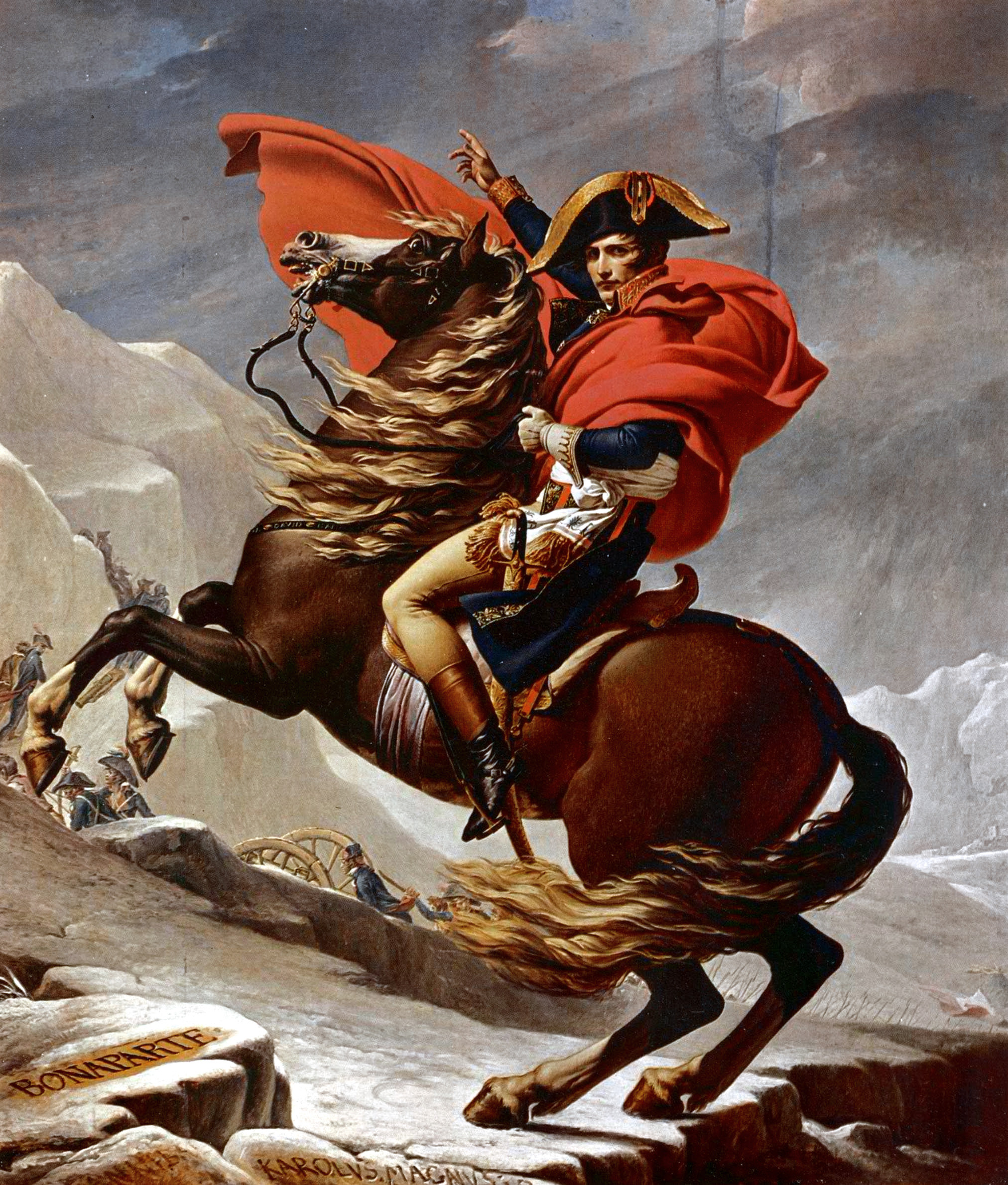
Second version, now located in Charlottenburg Palace

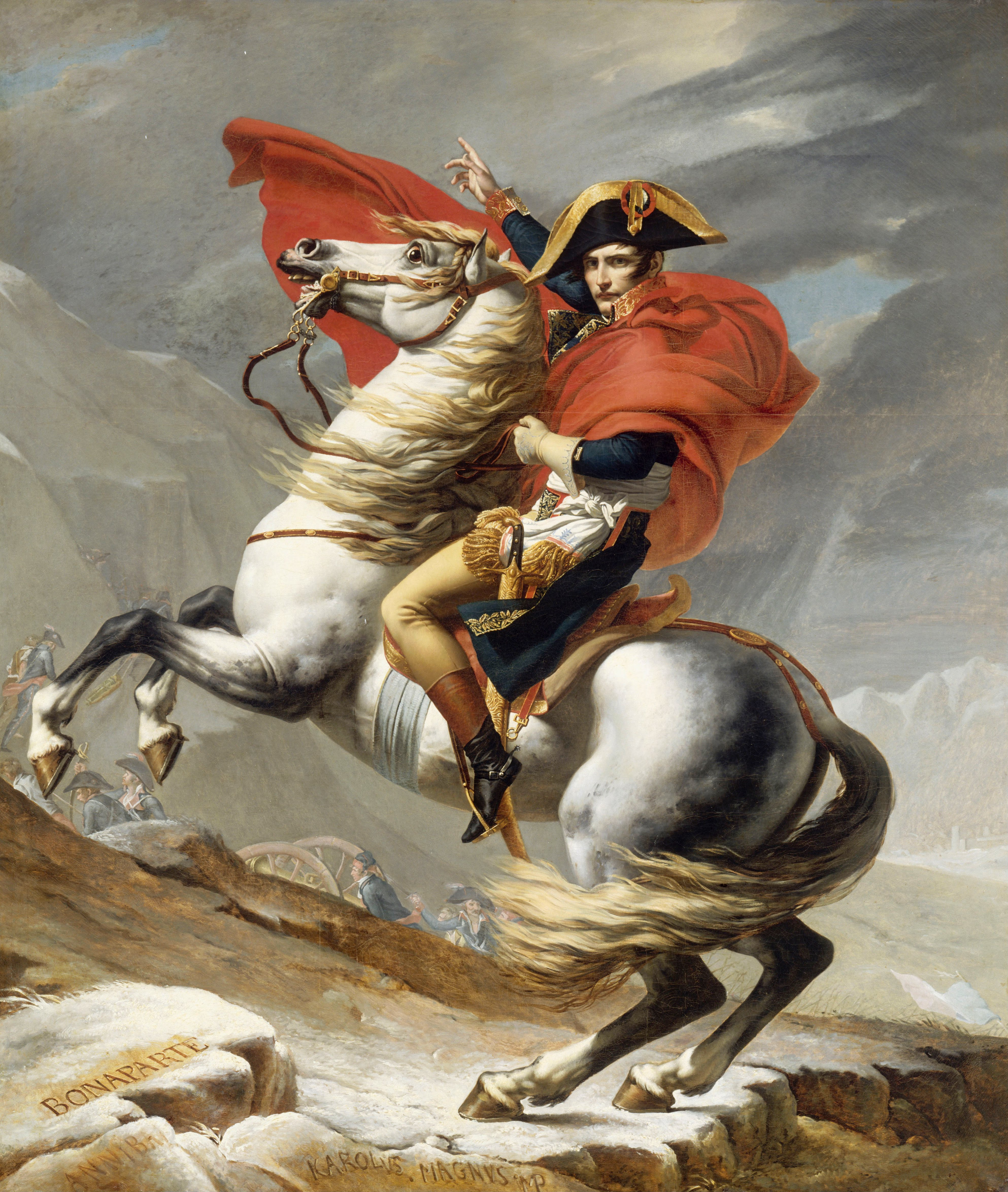
First Versailles version

Having taken power in France during the 18 Brumaire on 9 November 1799, Napoleon was determined to return to Italy to reinforce the French troops in the country and retake the territory seized by the Austrians in the preceding years. In the spring of 1800 he led the Reserve Army across the Alps through the Great St Bernard Pass. The Austrian forces, under Michael von Melas, were laying siege to Masséna in Genoa and Napoleon hoped to gain the element of surprise by taking the trans-Alpine route. By the time Napoleon's troops arrived, Genoa had fallen; but he pushed ahead, hoping to engage the Austrians before they could regroup. The Reserve Army fought a battle at Montebello on 9 June before eventually securing a decisive victory at the Battle of Marengo. The installation of Napoleon as First Consul and the French victory in Italy called for a rapprochement with Charles IV of Spain. While talks were underway to re-establish diplomatic relations, a traditional exchange of gifts took place. Charles received Versailles-manufactured pistols, dresses from the best Parisian dressmakers, jewels for the queen, and a fine set of armour for the newly reappointed Prime Minister, Manuel Godoy. In return Napoleon was offered sixteen Spanish horses from the royal stables, portraits of the king and queen by Goya, and the portrait that was to be commissioned from David. The French ambassador to Spain, Charles-Jean-Marie Alquier, requested the original painting from David on Charles' behalf. The portrait was to hang in the Royal Palace of Madrid as a token of the new relationship between the two countries. David, who had been an ardent supporter of the Revolution but had transferred his fervour to the new Consulate, was eager to undertake the commission.

On learning of the request, Bonaparte instructed David to produce three further versions: one for the Château de Saint-Cloud, one for the library of Les Invalides, and a third for the Royal Palace of Milan, capital of the Cisalpine Republic. A fifth version was produced by David and remained in his various workshops until his death.

=== History of the five versions ===
The original painting remained in Madrid until 1812, when it was plundered from Spain by Joseph Bonaparte when he fled after losing the Peninsular War.

He took it with him to Point Breeze in Bordentown, NJ, United States where he lived from 1816 to 1839. The painting was handed down through his descendants until 1949, when his great grandniece Eugénie bequeathed it to the museum of the Château de Malmaison.

The version produced for the Château de Saint-Cloud from 1801 was removed in 1814 by the Prussian soldiers under von Blücher who offered it to King Frederick William III. It is now held in the Charlottenburg Palace in Berlin.

The 1802 copy from Les Invalides was taken down and put into storage on the Bourbon Restoration of 1814; but in 1837, under the orders of King Louis Philippe I, it was rehung in his newly inaugurated Musée de l'Histoire de France at the Palace of Versailles, where it remains to the present day.

The 1803 version was delivered to Milan but confiscated in 1816 by the Austrians. The people of Milan refused to give it up and it remained in the city until 1825. It was finally installed at the Belvedere in Vienna in 1834. It remains there today, now part of the collection of the Österreichische Galerie Belvedere.

The version kept by David until his death in 1825 was exhibited at the Bazar Bonne-Nouvelle in 1846 (where it was remarked upon by Baudelaire). In 1850 it was offered to President Louis-Napoléon Bonaparte (the future Napoleon III) by David's daughter, Pauline Jeanin, and installed at the Tuileries Palace. In 1979, it was given to the museum at the Palace of Versailles.

== Paintings ==
The commission specified a portrait of Napoleon standing in the uniform of the First Consul, probably in the spirit of the portraits that were later produced by Antoine-Jean Gros, Robert Lefèvre (Napoleon in his coronation robes) and Jean Auguste Dominique Ingres (Napoleon I on his Imperial Throne), but David was keen to paint an equestrian scene. The Spanish ambassador, Ignacio Muzquiz, informed Napoleon and asked him how he would like to be represented. Napoleon initially requested to be shown reviewing the troops but eventually decided on a scene showing him crossing the Alps.

In reality the crossing had been made in fine weather and Bonaparte had been led across by a guide mounted on a mule. However, from the outset the painting was first and foremost propaganda, and Bonaparte asked David to portray him "calm, mounted on a fiery steed" (Calme sur un cheval fougueux), and it is probable that he also suggested the addition of the names of the other great generals who had led their forces across the Alps: Hannibal and Charlemagne.

=== Production ===
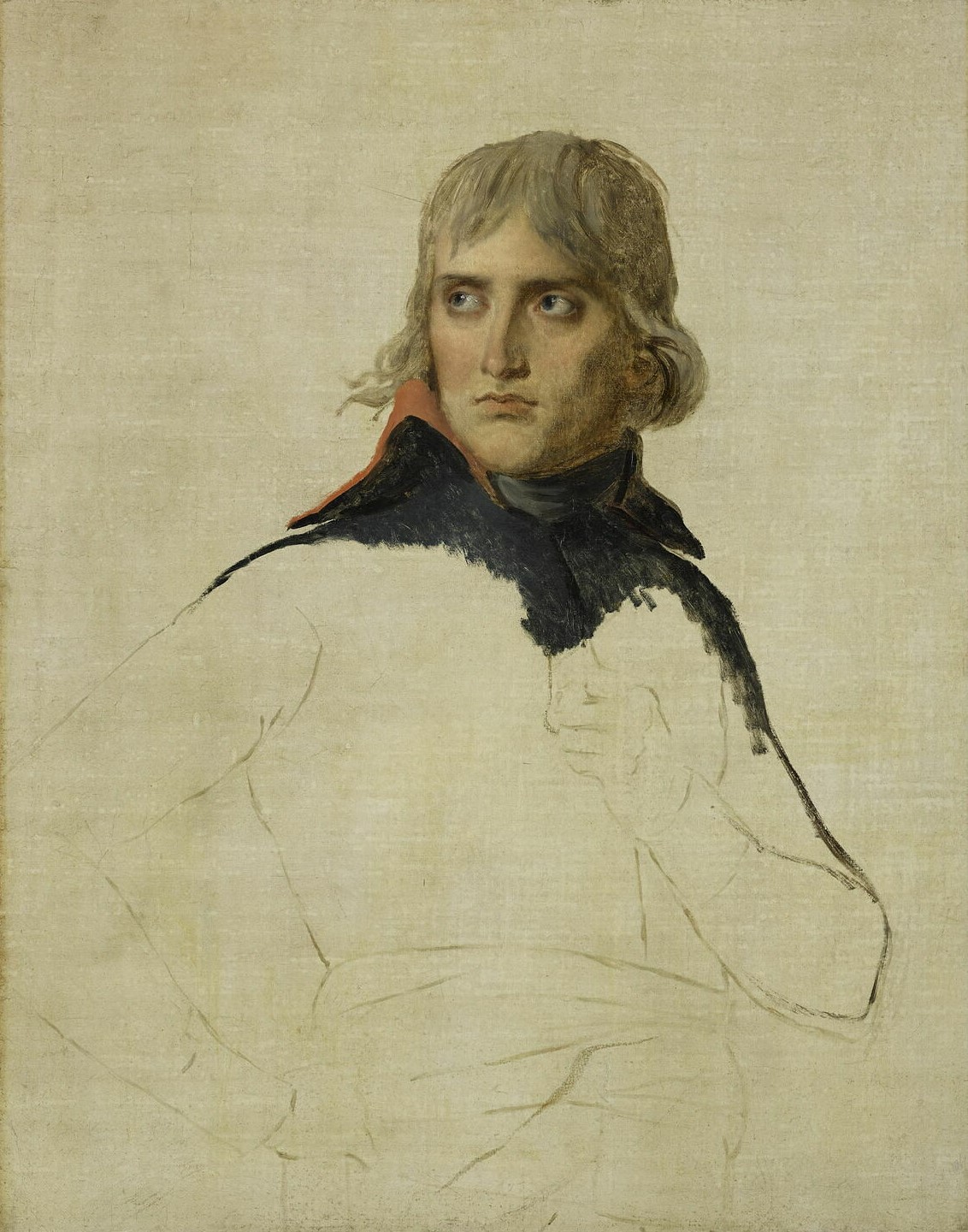
David's unfinished portrait of Napoleon from 1798

Few drafts and preparatory studies were made, contrary to David's normal practice. Gros, David's pupil, produced a small oil sketch of a horse being reined in, which was a probable study for Napoleon's mount, and the notebooks of David show some sketches of first thoughts on the position of the rider. The lack of early studies may in part be explained by Bonaparte's refusal to sit for the portrait. He had sat for Gros in 1796 on the insistence of Joséphine de Beauharnais, but Gros had complained that he had not had enough time for the sitting to be of benefit. David had also managed to persuade him to sit for a portrait in 1798, but the three hours that the fidgety and impatient Bonaparte had granted him did not give him sufficient time to produce a decent likeness. On accepting the commission for the Alpine scene, it appears that David expected that he would be sitting for the study, but Bonaparte refused point blank, not only on the basis that he disliked sitting but also because he believed that the painting should be a representation of his character rather than his physical appearance:

— Sit? For what good? Do you think that the great men of Antiquity for whom we have images sat?
— But Citizen First Consul, I am painting you for your century, for the men who have seen you, who know you, they will want to find a resemblance.
— A resemblance? It isn't the exactness of the features, a wart on the nose which gives the resemblance. It is the character that dictates what must be painted...Nobody knows if the portraits of the great men resemble them, it is enough that their genius lives there.

The refusal to attend a sitting marked a break in the portraiture of Napoleon in general, with realism abandoned for political iconography: after this point the portraits become emblematic, capturing an ideal rather than a physical likeness.

Unable to convince Napoleon to sit for the picture, David took a bust as a starting point for his features, and made his son perch on top of a ladder as a model for the posture. The uniform is accurate, as David was able to borrow the uniform and bicorne worn by Bonaparte at Marengo. Two of Napoleon's horses were used as models for the "fiery steed": the mare "la Belle" which features in the version held at Charlottenburg, and the famous grey Marengo which appears in those held at Versailles and Vienna. Engravings from Voyage pittoresque de la Suisse served as models for the landscape.

The first of the five portraits was painted in four months, from October 1800 to January 1801. On completion of the initial version, David immediately began work on the second version which was finished on 25 May, the date of Bonaparte's inspection of the portraits at David's Louvre workshop.

Two of David's pupils assisted him in producing the different versions: Jérôme-Martin Langlois worked primarily on the first two portraits, and George Rouget produced the copy for Les Invalides.

=== Technique ===
In contrast to his predecessors François Boucher and Jean-Honoré Fragonard, who employed a red or grey undercoat as a base colour to build up the painting, David used white background of the canvas directly underneath his colours, as some of his unfinished works show, such as his first attempt at a portrait of Bonaparte or his sketch of the Tennis Court Oath.

David worked using two or three layers. After having captured the basic outline with an ochre drawing, he would flesh out the painting with light touches, using a brush with little paint, and concentrating on the blocks of light and shade rather than the details. The results of this technique are particularly noticeable in the original version of Napoleon Crossing the Alps from Malmaison, especially in the treatment of the rump of the horse. With the second layer, David concentrated on filling out the details and correcting possible defects.

The third and last layer was used for finishing touches: by blending of tones and smoothing the surface. David often left this task to his assistants.

=== Detail ===
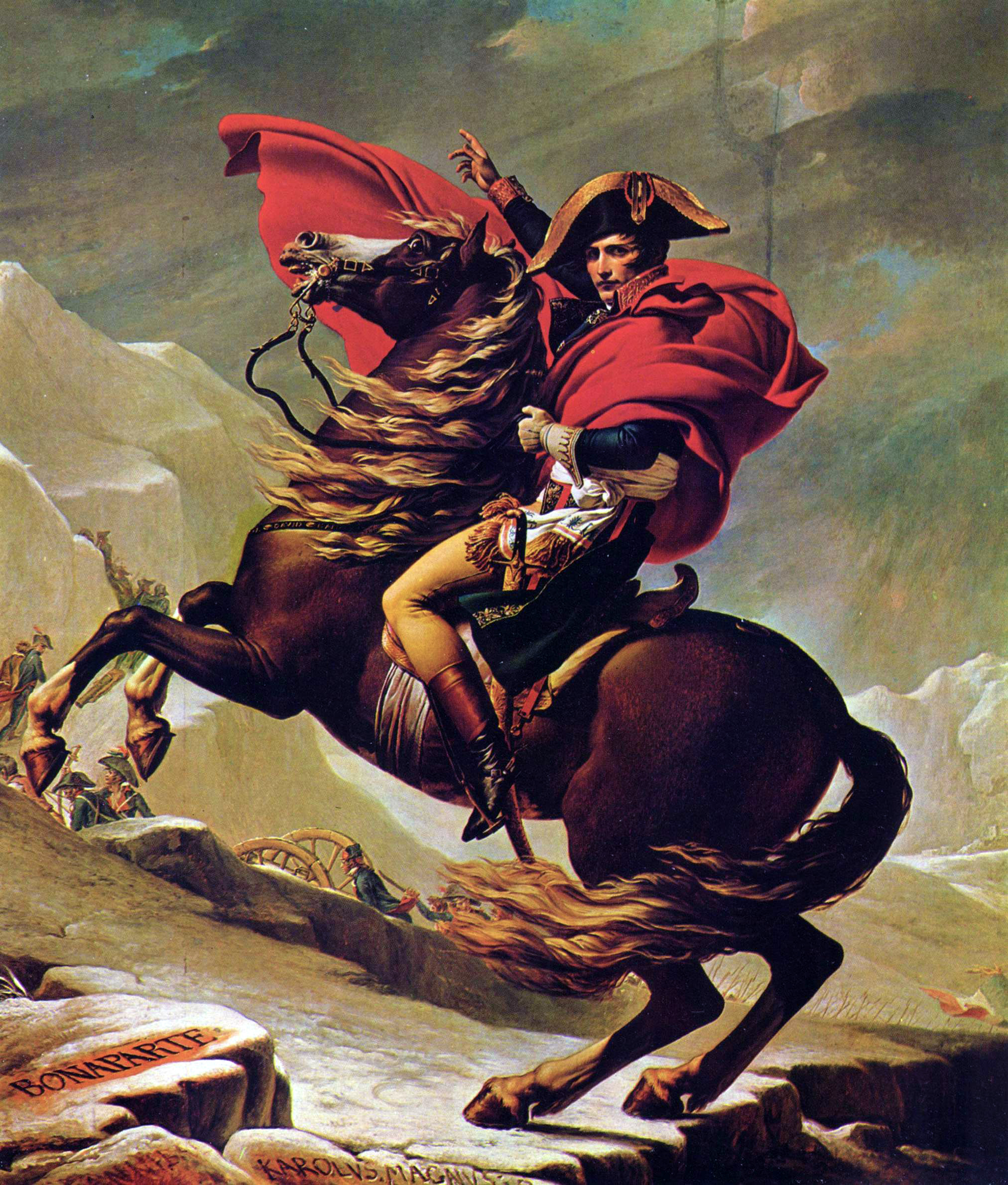
Charlottenburg version, Berlin

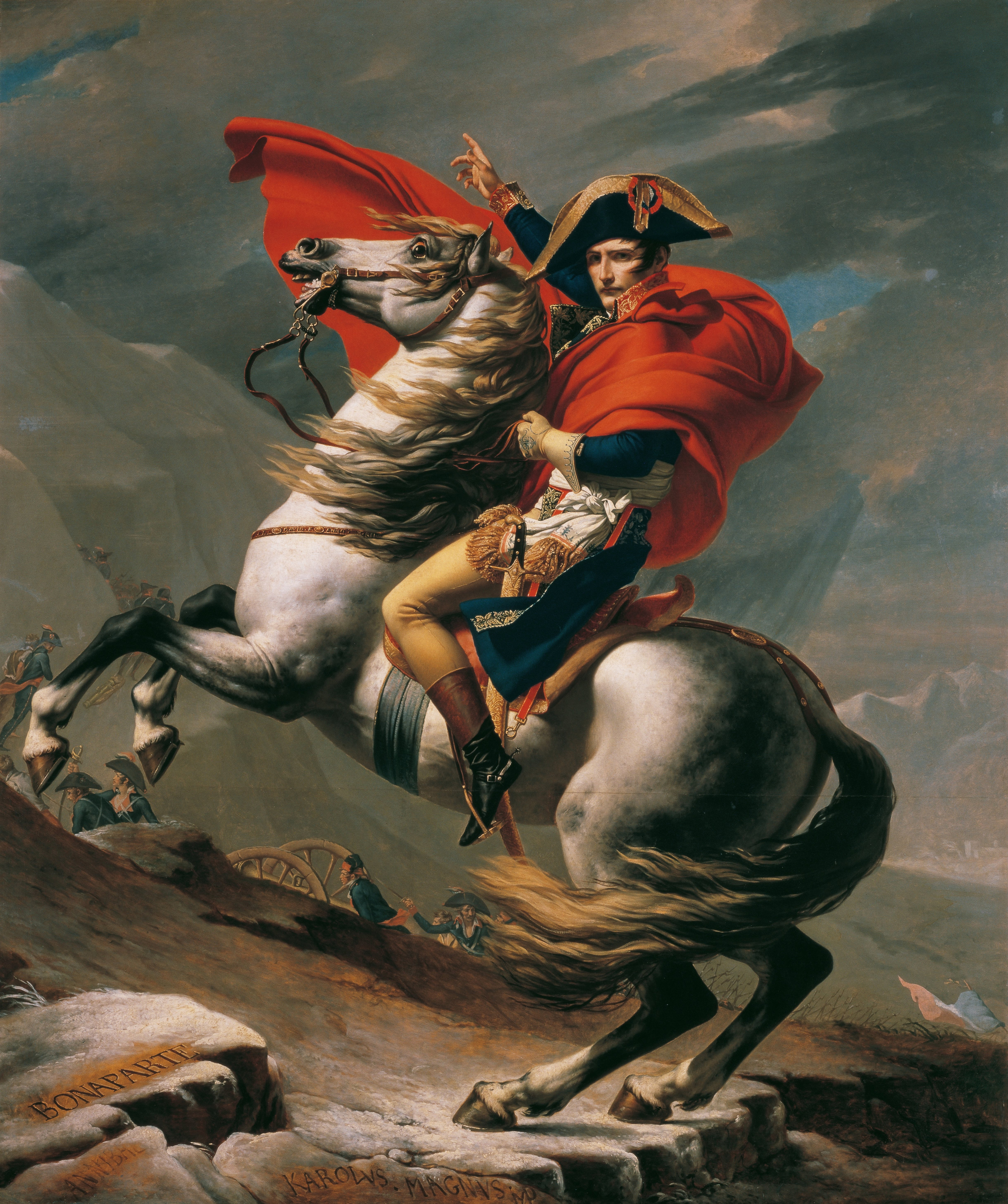
Belvedere version, Vienna

All five versions of the picture are of roughly the same large size (2.6 m × 2.2 m). Bonaparte appears mounted in the uniform of a general in chief, wearing a gold-trimmed bicorne, and armed with a Mamluk-style sabre. He is wreathed in the folds of a large cloak which billows in the wind. His head is turned towards the viewer, and he gestures with his right hand toward the mountain summit. His left hand grips the reins of his steed. The horse rears up on its back legs, its mane and tail whipped against its body by the same wind that inflates Napoleon's cloak. In background a line of the soldiers interspersed with artillery make their way up the mountain. Dark clouds hang over the picture and in front of Bonaparte the mountains rise up sharply. In the foreground BONAPARTE, HANNIBAL and KAROLVS MAGNVS IMP. are engraved on rocks. On the breastplate yoke of the horse, the picture is signed and dated.

=== Differences among the five versions ===
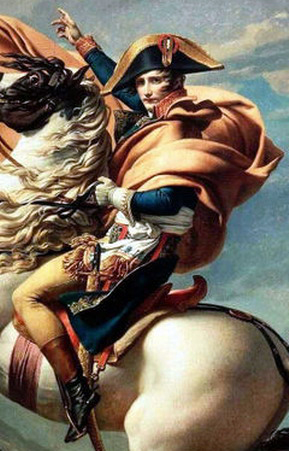
Detail of Napoleon in a golden cloak

In the original version held at Malmaison (260 × 221 cm; 102 1/3 × 87 in), Bonaparte has an orange cloak, the crispin (cuff) of his gauntlet is embroidered, the horse is a black and white piebald, and the tack is complete and includes a Running Martingale. The girth around the horse's belly is a dark faded red. The officer holding a sabre in the background is obscured by the horse's tail. Napoleon's face appears youthful. The painting is signed in the yoke of the breastplate: L. DAVID YEAR IX.

The Charlottenburg version (260 × 226 cm; 102 1/3 × 89 in) shows Napoleon in a red cloak mounted on a chestnut horse. The tack is simpler, lacking the martingale, and the girth is grey-blue. There are traces of snow on the ground. Napoleon's features are sunken with the faint hint of a smile. The picture is signed L.DAVID YEAR IX.

In the first Versailles version (272 × 232 cm; 107 × 91 1/3 in), the horse is a dappled grey, the tack is identical to that of the Charlottenburg version, and the girth is blue. The embroidery of the gauntlet is simplified with the facing of the sleeve visible under the glove. The landscape is darker and Napoleon's expression is sterner. The picture is not signed.

The version from the Belvedere (264 × 232 cm; 104 × 91 1/3 in) is almost identical to that of Versailles but is signed J.L.DAVID L.ANNO X.

The second Versailles version (267 × 230 cm; 105 × 90 1/2 in) shows a black and white horse with complete tack but lacking the martingale. The girth is red. The cloak is orange-red, the collar is black, and the embroidery of the gauntlet is very simple and almost unnoticeable. The scarf tied around Napoleon's waist is light blue. The officer with the sabre is again masked by the tail of the horse. Napoleon's features are older, he has shorter hair, and—as in the Charlottenburg version—there is the faint trace of a smile. The embroidery and the style of the bicorne suggest that the picture was completed after 1804. The picture is not dated but is signed L.DAVID.

== Influences ==
After Napoleon's rise to power and the victory at Marengo, the fashion was for allegorical portraits of Bonaparte, glorifying the new Master of France, such as Antoine-François Callet's Allegory of the Battle of Marengo, featuring Bonaparte dressed in Roman costume and flanked by winged symbols of victory, and Pierre Paul Prud'hon's Triumph of Bonaparte, featuring the First Consul in a chariot accompanied by winged figures. David chose symbolism rather than allegory. His figure of Bonaparte is heroic and idealized but it lacks the concrete symbols of allegorical painting.

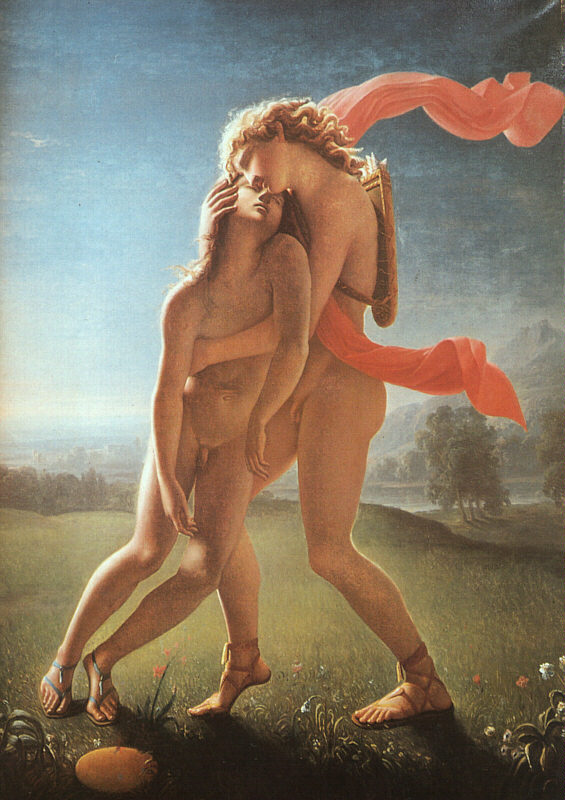
The Death of Hyacinthos Jean Broc, 1801

Faithful to his desire for a "return to the pure Greek" (retour vers le grec pur), David applied the radical neo-classicism that he had demonstrated in his 1799 The Intervention of the Sabine Women to the portrait of Bonaparte, with the use of contemporary costumes the only concession. The horse from the first version is almost identical in posture and colouring to one featured in the melee of The Intervention of the Sabine Women.

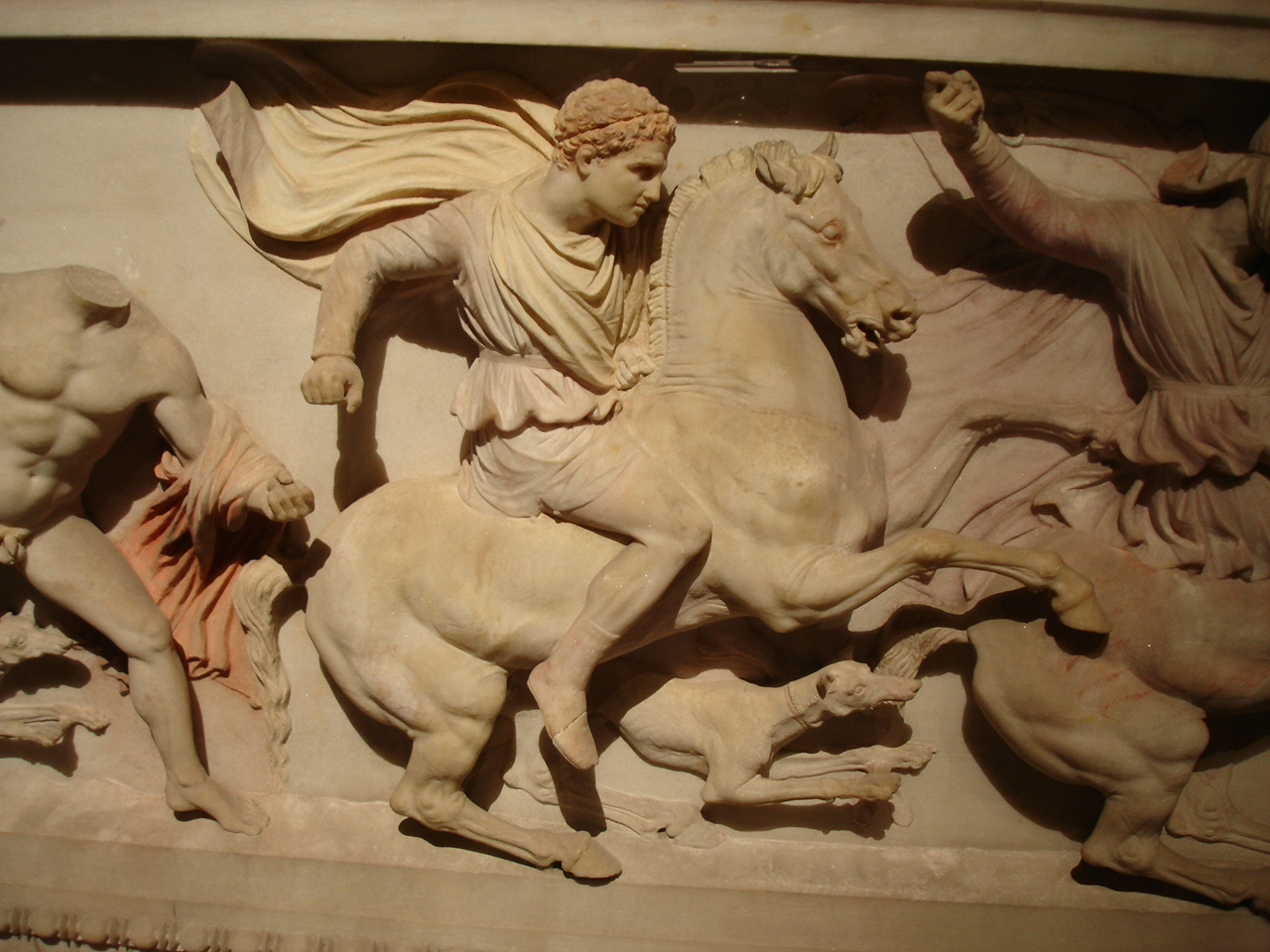
Relief from Alexander's sarcophagus.

The youthful figure of Bonaparte in the initial painting reflects the aesthetic of the "beautiful ideal" symbolized by the "Apollo Belvedere" and taken to its zenith in The Death of Hyacinthos by Jean Broc, one of David's pupils. The figure of the beautiful young man which David had already painted in La Mort du jeune Bara is also present in The Intervention of the Sabine Women. The youthful posture of David's son, forced into posing for the artist by Bonaparte's refusal to sit, is evident in the attitude of the Napoleon portrayed in the painting; with his legs folded like the Greek riders, the youthful figure evokes the young Alexander the Great mounted on Bucephalus as seen on his sarcophagus (now in the archaeological museum of Istanbul).

For the horse, David takes as a starting point the equestrian statue of Peter the Great, The Bronze Horseman by Étienne Maurice Falconet in Saint Petersburg, duplicating the calm handling of a rearing horse on rocky ground. There are also hints of Titus in The Destruction of the Temple of Jerusalem by Nicolas Poussin, a painter who strongly influenced David's work. The horses of the Greek statuary which appear many times in David's notebooks point to the bas-reliefs of the Parthenon as a source of inspiration.

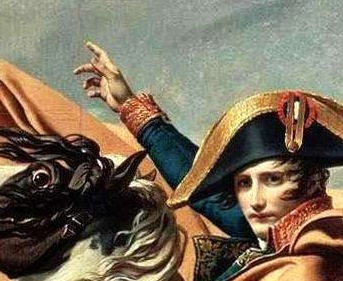
Detail of the gesture in the Malmaison version.

== Reception ==
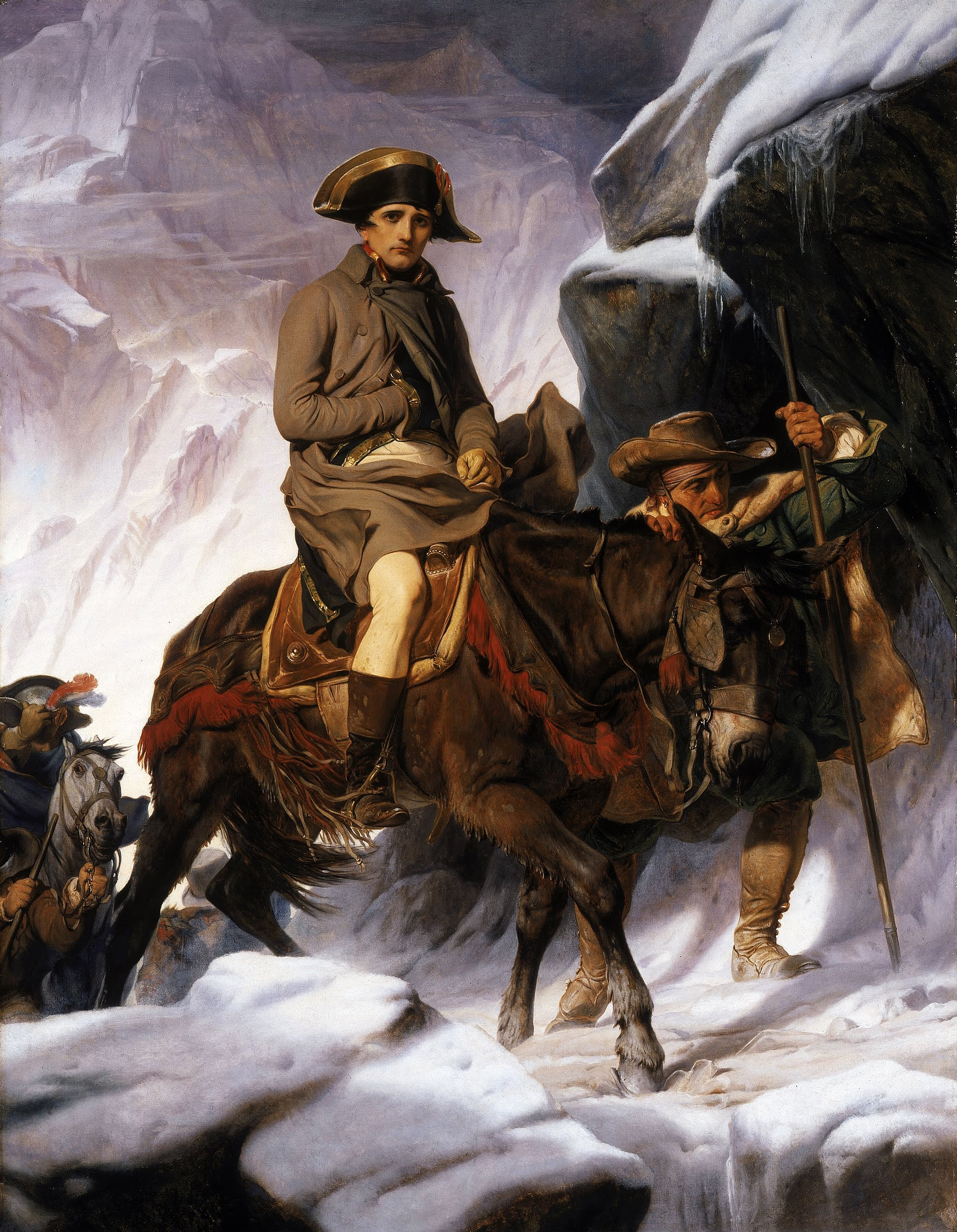
Bonaparte Crossing the Alps Paul Delaroche 1850

The first two copies were exhibited in the Louvre in June 1801 alongside The Intervention of the Sabine Women, and although there was an outcry in the press over the purchase, the painting quickly became well known as a result of the numerous reproductions that were produced, the image appearing everywhere from posters to postage stamps. It quickly became the most reproduced image of Napoleon.

With this work David took the genre of equestrian portraiture to its zenith. No other equestrian portrait made under Napoleon gained such celebrity, with perhaps the exception of Théodore Géricault's The Charging Chasseur of 1812.

With Bonaparte's exile in 1815 the portraits fell out of fashion, but by the late 1830s they were once again being hung in the art galleries and museums.

=== Delaroche's version ===
Arthur George, 3rd Earl of Onslow, who had a large Napoleonic collection, was visiting the Louvre with Paul Delaroche in 1848 and commented on the implausibility and theatricality of David's painting. He commissioned Delaroche to produce a more accurate version which featured Napoleon on a mule; the final painting, Napoleon Crossing the Alps, was completed in 1850. While Delaroche's painting is more realistic than the symbolic heroic representation of David, it was not meant to be demeaning - Delaroche admired Bonaparte and thought that the achievement was not diminished by depicting it in a realistic fashion.

=== The Black Brunswicker ===
John Everett Millais also used the image to contrast David's theatrical rhetoric with a naturalistic scenario in his painting The Black Brunswicker, in which a print of the painting hangs on the wall of a room in which one of the Brunswickers who fought at the Battle of Quatre Bras prepares to leave his sweetheart to join the fight against Napoleon.

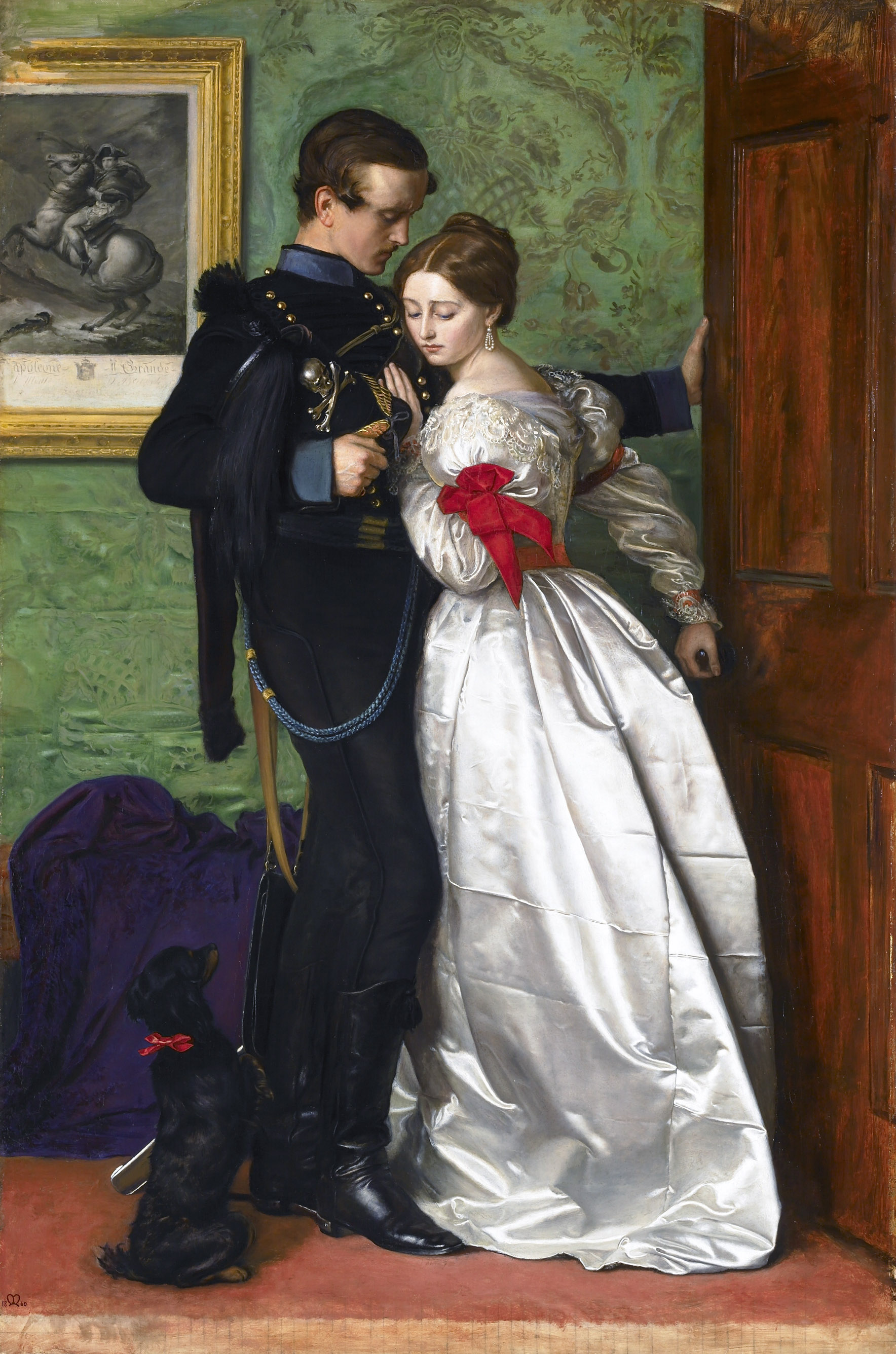
The Black Brunswicker (1860)

== See also ==
- List of paintings by Jacques-Louis David

== General references ==
- Dominique-Vivant Denon, Vivant Denon, Directeur des musées sous le Consulat et l'Empire, Correspondance, 2 vol., Réunion des Musées nationaux, Paris, 1999 (in French)
- Antoine Schnapper (commissaire de l'exposition), David 1748–1825 catalogue de l'exposition Louvre-Versailles, Réunion des Musées nationaux, Paris, 1989 ISBN 2-7118-2326-1 (in French)
- Daniel et Guy Wildenstein, Document complémentaires au catalogue de l'œuvre de Louis David, Fondation Wildenstein, Paris, 1973. (in French)
