= Bonaparte Crossing the Alps =

1850 painting by Paul Delaroche

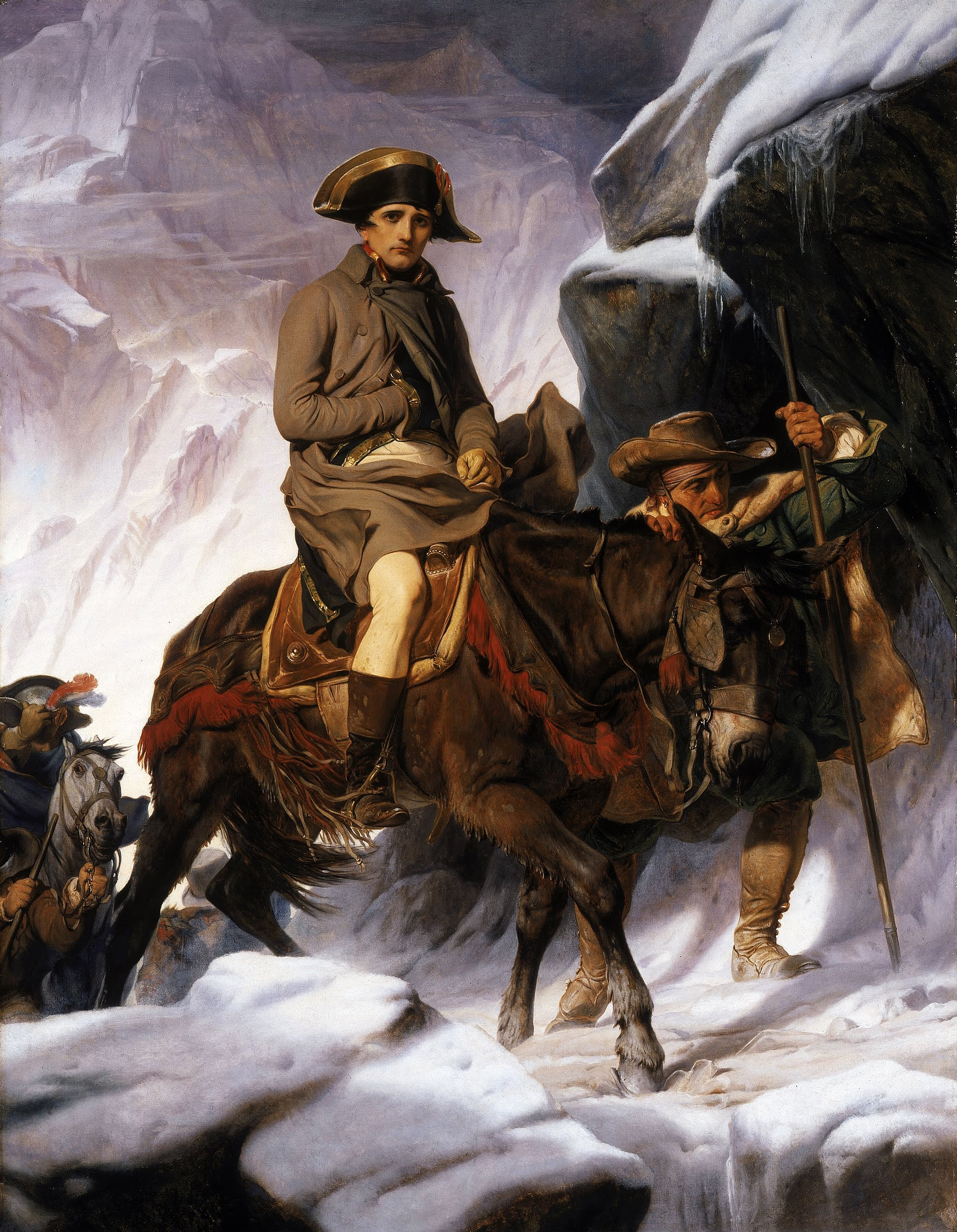
- Artist: Paul Delaroche
- Year: 1850
- Medium: Oil on canvas
- Dimensions: 289 cm × 222 cm (114 in × 87 in)
- Location: Louvre, Paris

Bonaparte Crossing the Alps (sometimes called Napoleon Crossing the Alps, which is also the title of Jacques-Louis David's better-known version of the subject) is an 1848–1850 oil painting by French artist Paul Delaroche. The painting depicts Napoleon Bonaparte leading his army through the Alps on a mule,^{[I]} a journey Napoleon and his army of soldiers made in the spring of 1800 in an attempt to surprise the Austrian army in Italy. Several versions of this painting exist: in the Louvre-Lens and the Walker Art Gallery in Liverpool, England. Queen Victoria owned a small version of it.

The work was inspired by Jacques-Louis David's series of five paintings of Napoleon Crossing the Alps (1801–1805), which present a glorified vision of Napoleon "calm on a spirited horse" rather than a mule, crossing Great St. Bernard Pass.

== Painting ==
=== Historical background ===
In mid-1798, Napoleon led a French army which invaded Egypt, which was then part of the Ottoman Empire. The invasion's stated aims included securing French commercial interests in the Middle East, cutting off British trade routes to the East Indies and establishing a scientific presence in Egypt. Though the French scored several victories against Ottoman forces and occupied Lower Egypt, Napoleon's attempts to expand into Syria ended with defeat at the siege of Acre in 1799 and he led his army back to Egypt. There, Napoleon read reports of French defeats in Italy and secretly returned to Paris.

In order to regain the upper hand in Italy, Napoleon planned to launch a surprise assault on the Austrian army stationed in the Cisalpine Republic. Based on the assumption the Austrians would never expect Napoleon's large force to be able to traverse the Alps, he chose that as his route. He selected the shortest route through the Alps, the Great St Bernard Pass, which would enable him to reach his destination as quickly as possible.

On 15 May 1800, Napoleon and his army of 40,000—not including the field artillery and baggage trains—(35,000 light artillery and infantry, 5,000 cavalry) began the arduous journey through the mountains.^{[II]} During the five days spent traversing the pass, Napoleon's army consumed almost 22,000 bottles of wine, more than a tonne and a half of cheese, and around 800 kilograms of meat.

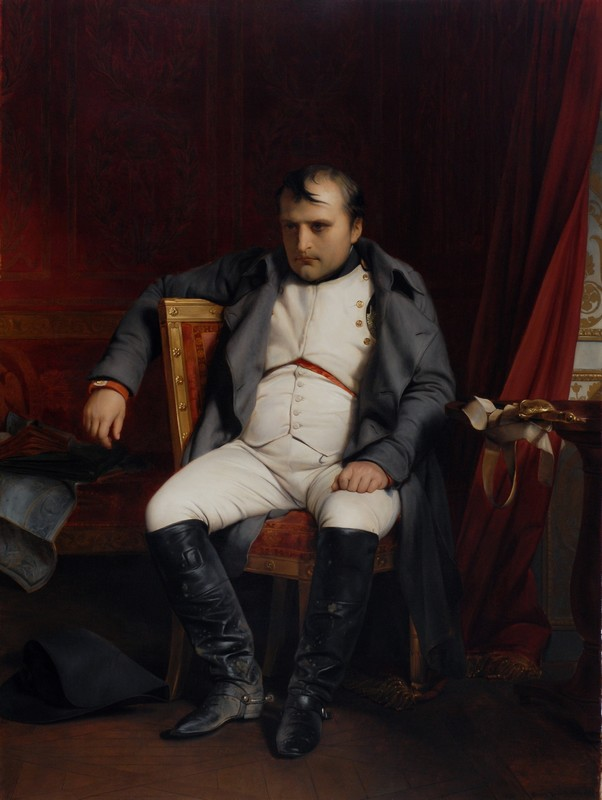
Delaroche's "Napoléon abdiquant à Fontainebleau" ("Napoléon abdicated in Fontainebleau"), 1845 oil-on-canvas.

After crossing the Alps, Napoleon commenced military operations against the Austrian army. Despite an inauspicious start to the campaign, the Austrian forces were driven back to Marengo after nearly a month. There, a large battle took place on 14 June, which resulted in the Austrian evacuation of Italy.

=== Artist and commission ===
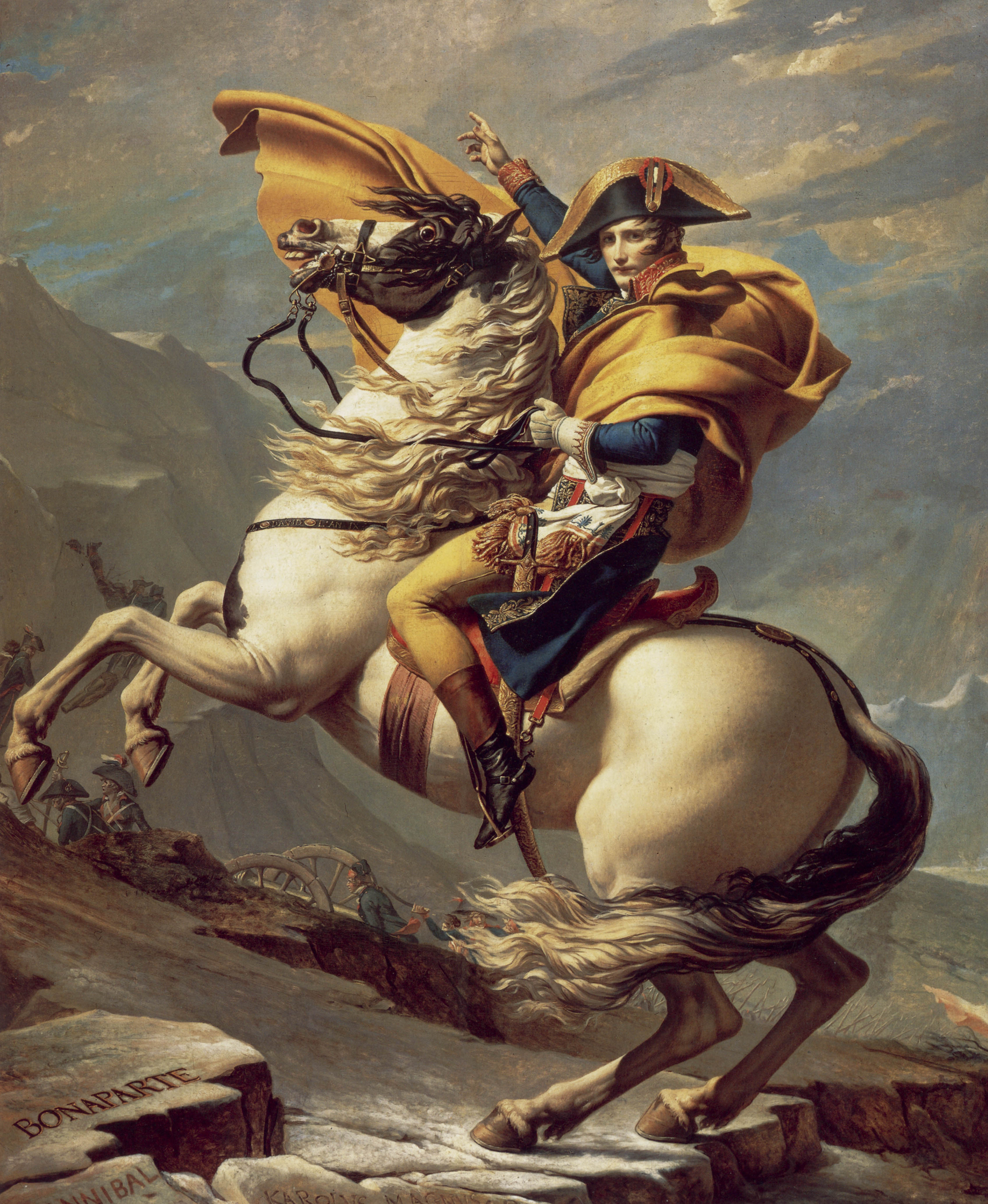
Jacques-Louis David's version of the scene differs a great deal from Delaroche's idea of Napoleon's crossing of the Alps.

Delaroche's picture of Napoleon crossing the Alps

Unconscious of the dreary wastes around,
Of sleet that pierces with each fitful blast,
The icy peaks, the rough and treacherous ground,
Huge snow-drifts by the whirlwind's breath amassed,
Through which the jaded mule with noiseless tread,
Patient and slow, a certain foothold seeks,
By the old peasant-guide so meekly led;
Moves the wan conqueror, with sunken cheeks,
O'er heights as cold and lonely as his soul,-
The chill lips blandly set, and the dark eyes
Intent with fierce ambition's vast control,
Sad, keen and thoughtful of the distant prize;
With the imperial robes and warlike steed,
That face ne'er wore such blended might and need!

— H.T. Tuckerman's poem, describing Delaroche's portrayal

Delaroche, who studied with Antoine-Jean Gros, a protege of David, was a popular French painter of portraits and grand subjects from history and the Bible.

The Liverpool painting was commissioned by Arthur George, Third Earl of Onslow, after Delaroche and George reportedly visited the Louvre in Paris, where they saw David's version of the famous event. It had only recently been re-hung in the museum after a resurgence of interest in Napoleon, nearly 40 years after he was exiled.^{[IV]} Agreeing that the painting was unrealistic, George, who owned a sizable collection of Napoleonic paraphernalia, commissioned Delaroche to create a more realistic depiction. Elizabeth Foucart-Walker asserts that in fact the painting that hangs in the Louvre-Lens was produced first as it was already in America by 1850, when the Liverpool painting was produced. Stephen Bann suggests that Arthur George's meeting with Delaroche may have occurred, but Delaroche chose to produce two works that are almost identical and send one to America.

== Reception ==
The work, despite its attempt to depict Napoleon realistically, was criticised by several authorities for a variety of reasons. A few disapproved of Delaroche's choice of painting, while others disapproved of Delaroche himself, saying, in some form, that he sought the genius of Napoleon, to no avail.

Soon after its completion, the work was taken to England, and there, in 1850, it was reviewed by the critic of the Atheneum,^{[VI]} a literary magazine. The magazine's comments on the work indicated that, while they praised the painting for several of its features, they criticised Delaroche, for various reasons:

An Officer in a French costume, mounted on a mule, is conducted by a rough peasant through a dangerous pass, whose traces are scarcely discernible through the deep-lying snow; and his aide-de-camp is just visible in a ravine of the towering Alps. These facts are rendered with a fidelity that has not omitted the plait of a drapery, the shaggy texture of the four-footed animal, nor a detail of the harness on his back. The drifting of the embedded snow, the pendent icicle which a solitary sun-ray in a transient moment has made-all are given with a truth which will be dear to those who exalt the Dutch School for like qualities into the foremost rank of excellence. But the lofty and daring genius that led the humble Lieutenant of Ajaccio to be ruler and arbiter of the destinies of the larger part of Europe will be sought in vain by M. Delaroche.

Some were displeased with Delaroche's work at the time in general, and, in part, Bonaparte Crossing the Alps, criticising what was described as his 'lowered standards in art'. Such critics included The Gentleman's Magazine, who wrote the following text about Delaroche:

These all reveal a modification in his style, but not a happy one. His more recent works are not calculated to restore him the sympathy he had lost. It must be confessed that Delaroche is an artist of talent rather than a genius. Education and diligent study qualified him to be a painter, but not an artist, in the true sense of that word. For he has failed in the true mission of the artist-that of advancing the education of the masses; when it was in his power to give an impulse, he yielded to it; he has been a reflection, but not a light; and instead of elevating the public to himself, he has lowered himself to the public.

== Notes ==
- I Bonaparte chose to ride across the alps on a mule (obtained at a convent at Martigny) rather than a steed, the typical gentleman's mount at the time, because the mule was considered to be more sure-footed on the slippery slopes and narrow passes of the Alps, and to be more sturdy and hardy while making such a perilous journey on such volatile terrain.
- II Napoleon ordered the assemblage of over 5,000 artillery for transport through the pass, despite the fact that the pass was widely considered to be much too narrow, and the route too volatile and unstable, to allow any form of artillery, light or heavy, to come through. Thus, Napoleon's military advisers warned him against this move, but he insisted on this presence of this great number of artillery.
- IIIIn addition to these figures, approximately 3,600 French men were wounded, with over 900 captured or missing, and almost 5,520 Austrians were wounded, with over 2,900 captured (missing numbers cannot be accurately estimated).
- IVThe painting was rehung as a result of the revival of Napoleon's reputation, and a fresh interest into his exploits. However, before this, in 1815, the year Napoleon was exiled, Napoleonic-themed art was proscribed for artists and painters, as he was not well liked because of events that had occurred in the few years immediately preceding 1815, and Napoleon's exile. It was only truly by the 1830s that artwork related to the emperor was being created once more. As such, after being removed from the walls of the Louvre around 1815, David's version had been re-hung by the time Delaroche observed it.
- VThe king of Spain (of the time) commissioned Jacques-Louis David's Napoleon Crossing the Alps as a friendly gesture towards Napoleon, hoping that the flattering gift would strengthen relationships between France and Spain, to the degree that Napoleon would not consider invading Spain and taking it over, after he became emperor. However, the king of Spain's attempt failed, and, soon after Napoleon crowned himself emperor, he crossed the Pyrenees and conquered Spain.
- VIThe Athenæum was a widely read literary magazine or periodical that was published in London between 1828 and 1923. Published weekly, the Athenæum grew and expanded to become one of the most influential and most widely read periodical of the Victorian era. Most of its content was composed of articles, reviews, and scientific and political news, among others. The topics covered in these texts included works of literature, fine art, music and theatre, science and politics.
