= Charles Frederick =

Charles Frederick may refer to:

- Sir Charles Frederick (MP) (1709–1785), British member of parliament
- Charles Frederick, Grand Duke of Baden (1728–1811)
- Charles Frederick (Royal Navy officer) (1797–1875), British admiral
- Charles Frederick, Grand Duke of Saxe-Weimar-Eisenach (1783–1853)
- Charles Frederick, Prince of Hohenzollern-Sigmaringen (1724–1785)
- Charles Frederick (American football) (born 1982), American football player
- Charles Arthur Frederick (1861–1913), British courtier
- Charles Osmond Frederick, British engineer
- Charles Frederick II, Duke of Württemberg-Oels (1690–1761)
- Charles Frederick, Duke of Holstein-Gottorp (1700–1739)
- Charles William Frederick, Margrave of Brandenburg-Ansbach (1712–1757)
- Sir Charles Edward Frederick, 7th Baronet (1843–1913), of the Frederick baronets
- Sir Charles Edward St John Frederick, 8th Baronet (1876–1938), of the Frederick baronets
- Sir Charles Boscawen Frederick, 10th Baronet (1919–2001), of the Frederick baronets

== See also ==
- Charles D. Fredricks (1823–1894), American photographer
- Charles Fredericks (1918–1970), American actor
- Frederick Charles (disambiguation)
