= Surrey Militia =

Auxiliary military force in Surrey, England, from 1558 to 1953

The Surrey Militia was an auxiliary (Note: It is incorrect to describe the British Militia as 'irregular': throughout their history they were equipped and trained exactly like the line regiments of the regular army, and once embodied in time of war they were fulltime professional soldiers for the duration of their enlistment.) military force in Surrey, England. From their formal organisation as trained bands in 1558 until their final service as the Special Reserve, the Militia regiments of the county served in home defence in all of Britain's major wars. They also saw active service during the Second Boer War, and trained thousands of reinforcements during World War I. After a shadowy postwar existence they were formally disbanded in 1953.

== Early history ==
The English militia was descended from the Anglo-Saxon Fyrd, the military force raised from the freemen of the shires under command of their Sheriff. (Note: Given the shire's proximity both to the invasion area and King Harold's route from London to the battlefield, it is highly probable that a sizeable portion of the fyrdmen in his army at the Battle of Hastings were men of Surrey.) The universal obligation to serve continued under the Norman and Plantagenet kings and was reorganised under the Assizes of Arms of 1181 and 1252, and again by the Statute of Winchester of 1285. The men were arrayed by the Hundreds into which each county was divided. There is a reference to the men of Wallington Hundred in Surrey being mustered in the 14th year of the reign of King Henry VIII (1522–3), and the great 1539 muster saw a number of hundreds in Surrey arrayed by the king's commissioners during March and April:

- Blackheath Hundred: 85 archers, 167 billmen, 80 men in 'harness' (armour)
- Tandridge Hundred: 109 archers, 281 billmen, 61 in harness
- Reigate Hundred: 109 archers, 283 billmen, 76 in harness
- Wotton Hundred: 31 archers, 116 billmen, 138 in harness
- Wallington Hundred: 48 archers, 183 billmen, 56 in harness

Surrey was ordered to furnish 400 men when invasion threatened in 1545: each hundred was assessed at 4–8 archers and 16–32 billmen, the towns (Southwark, Kingston upon Thames, Guildford and Croydon) at 4–6 archers and 6–16 billmen each. This selected body of men was commanded by two captains, Thomas Hall of Compton and William Creswell of Farnham.

== Surrey Trained Bands ==
Under the later Tudors the legal basis of the militia was updated by two acts of 1557 covering musters (4 & 5 Ph. & M. c. 3) and the maintenance of horses and armour (4 & 5 Ph. & M. c. 2), which placed the county militia under a Lord Lieutenant appointed by the monarch, assisted by the Deputy Lieutenants and Justices of the Peace. The entry into force of these Acts in 1558 is seen as the starting date for the organised county militia in England.

Although the militia obligation was universal, it was clearly impractical to train and equip every able-bodied man (in 1574 Surrey had 6000 able men, of whom 1800 were armed, and 96 Demi-lancers with half-armour), so after 1572 the practice was to select a proportion of men for the Trained Bands, who were mustered for regular drills. From 1584 Surrey was rated as a 'maritime' county in danger from Spanish invasion, and was given extra training by professional captains. The Armada Crisis in 1588 led to the mobilisation of the trained bands and eight Surrey companies (1900 men) were present at the camp where Queen Elizabeth gave her Tilbury speech, when 500 Surrey men were specially selected as the Queen's bodyguard.

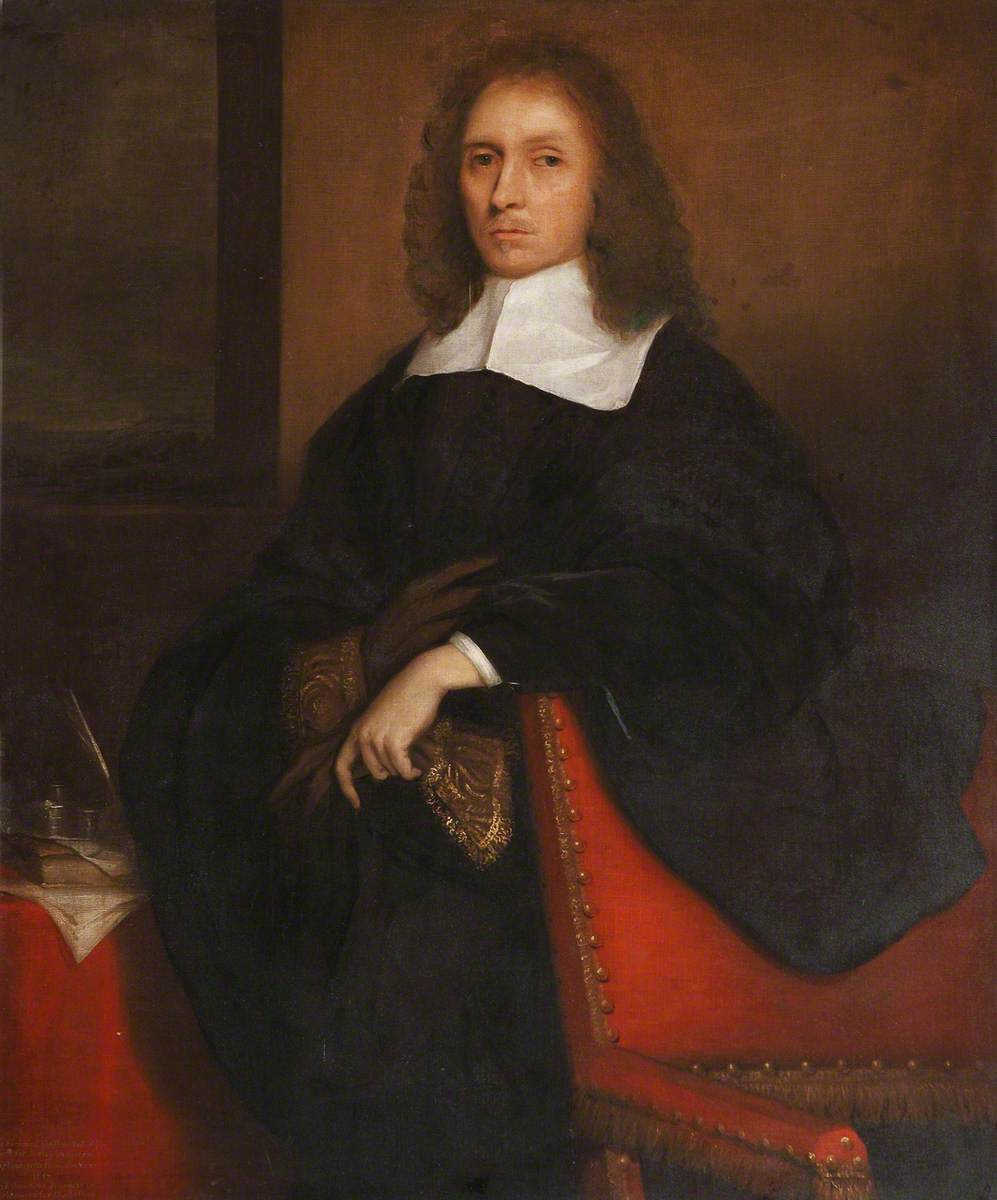
Sir Richard Onslow (1601–64), MP, 'The Red Fox of Surrey'.

=== Civil Wars ===
With the passing of the threat of invasion, the trained bands declined during the following decades until King Charles I attempted to reform them into a national force or 'Perfect Militia' answering to the monarch rather than local officials. In 1638 the reformed Surrey Trained Bands totalled 1500 men organised into three foot regiments and one of horse. In 1640 Surrey was ordered to send 800 picked men for the Second Bishops' War.

Control of the trained bands was one of the major points of dispute between Charles I and Parliament that led to the First English Civil War. As the crisis deepened, Lord Digby and Sir Thomas Lunsford began raising Royalist volunteers and gathering arms and armour at Kingston. On 17 January 1642 Sir Richard Onslow, Member of parliament and Deputy Lieutenant for Surrey, raised the trained bands of the county, dispersed Digby's men at Kingston, and seized the county magazine for Parliament. He also put men into Farnham to watch the Portsmouth Road.

Once the Civil War developed, neither side made much further use of the Trained Bands except as a source of recruits and weapons for their own full-time regiments. However, Surrey Trained Bands participated in the Siege of Portsmouth in the summer of 1642 and in November they defended Kingston Bridge while the Battle of Brentford was fought nearby.

New Militia Acts in 1648 and 1650 replaced Lords Lieutenant with county commissioners appointed by Parliament or the Council of State. From now on the term 'Trained Band' began to disappear in most counties. Sir Richard Onslow was ordered to march a regiment of Surrey Militia to Scotland during Cromwell's invasion, but the order was countermanded after the Battle of Dunbar. During the Scots' counter-invasion in 1651, the Surrey Militia was moved to Dunstable and then Oxford to join the army, and part of the regiment was present at the Battle of Worcester.

== Surrey Militia ==
After the Restoration of the Monarchy, the English Militia was re-established by The King's Sole Right over the Militia Act 1661 under the control of the king's lords-lieutenant, the men to be selected by ballot. This was popularly seen as the 'Constitutional Force' to counterbalance a 'Standing Army' tainted by association with the New Model Army that had supported Cromwell's military dictatorship, and almost the whole burden of home defence and internal security was entrusted to the militia.

On 4 September 1666, Charles II called out the Surrey Militia to assist in fighting the Great Fire of London. In May 1667, under threat of a Dutch invasion, the militia of the maritime counties was ordered to assemble, and on 10 June, with the Dutch fleet in the Thames estuary, the Surrey regiment was ordered to send half its men to Southwark to defend the London area, while the remainder stayed for local defence. The militia was called out during the Monmouth Rebellion in 1685, and several regiments saw action during the Sedgemoor campaign, but Surrey's was not involved in the fighting.

Musters of the Surrey Militia in 1690 and 1697 under the command of the Duke of Norfolk as Lord Lieutenant of Surrey saw the county regiment of Foot furnishing 1000–1200 men in nine companies from towns across the county, wearing red coats, and two troops of horse totalling 120–132 men, while Southwark supplied another six companies (1500 men in 1690, 910 in 1697) with the Duke as Colonel of both regiments. The county regiment had the following distribution of companies:

- Croydon (Col the Duke of Norfolk) 150 men
- Leatherhead (Lieutenant-Colonel Sir Christopher Buckle), 154 men
- Reigate (Major Benjamin Bonwick), 132 men
- Guildford (Capt John Autten), 137 men
- Chertsey (Capt Richard Bonsey) 130 men
- Kingston (Capt Thomas Wiggington) 128 men
- Putney (Capt Thomas Wandall) 132 men
- Godalming (Capt Richard Bridger) 116 men
- Farnham (Capt John Lampard) 130 men

The Militia passed into virtual abeyance during the long peace after the Treaty of Utrecht in 1712, although a few counties (not Surrey) were called out during the Jacobite Rising of 1745.

== 1757 reforms ==
=== Seven Years War ===
Under threat of French invasion during the Seven Years' War a series of Militia Acts from 1757 re-established county militia regiments, the men being conscripted by means of parish ballots (paid substitutes were permitted) to serve for three years. Surrey was given a quota of 800 men to raise, under the command of the Lord-Lieutenant, Richard Onslow, 3rd Baron Onslow (a descendant of Sir Richard Onslow).

Arms for the Surrey Militia were authorised on 23 February 1759 when 60 per cent of the quota had been raised, and the regiment was formed at Richmond-upon-Thames on 18 April 1759. By now Lord Onslow had resigned the colonelcy (he remained lord lieutenant) and had been replaced by Sir Nicholas Hacket Carew, 2nd Baronet, of Beddington, with his kinsman George Onslow as lieutenant-colonel.

The regiment was embodied for full-time service from 6 July 1759 and marched to Kent, where the companies were distributed. In August they were concentrated again and marched to Frindsbury. On 3 November the regiment was split into two battalions of five companies each, the 1st or Eastern commanded by Carew and the 2nd or Western by Onslow. They then went into winter quarters in Surrey, the 1st Bn at Kingston, the 2nd at Putney, Fulham and Wandsworth. Thereafter the regiments were frequently moved about the country, one of their duties being to guard French prisoners of war. The Peace of Fontainebleau was signed on 3 November 1762, ending the war, and the regiments were disembodied. The following year the two battalions were merged into a single regiment again; Sir Nicholas Carew had died in August 1762, so George Onslow was appointed colonel of the amalgamated regiment.

=== American War of Independence ===
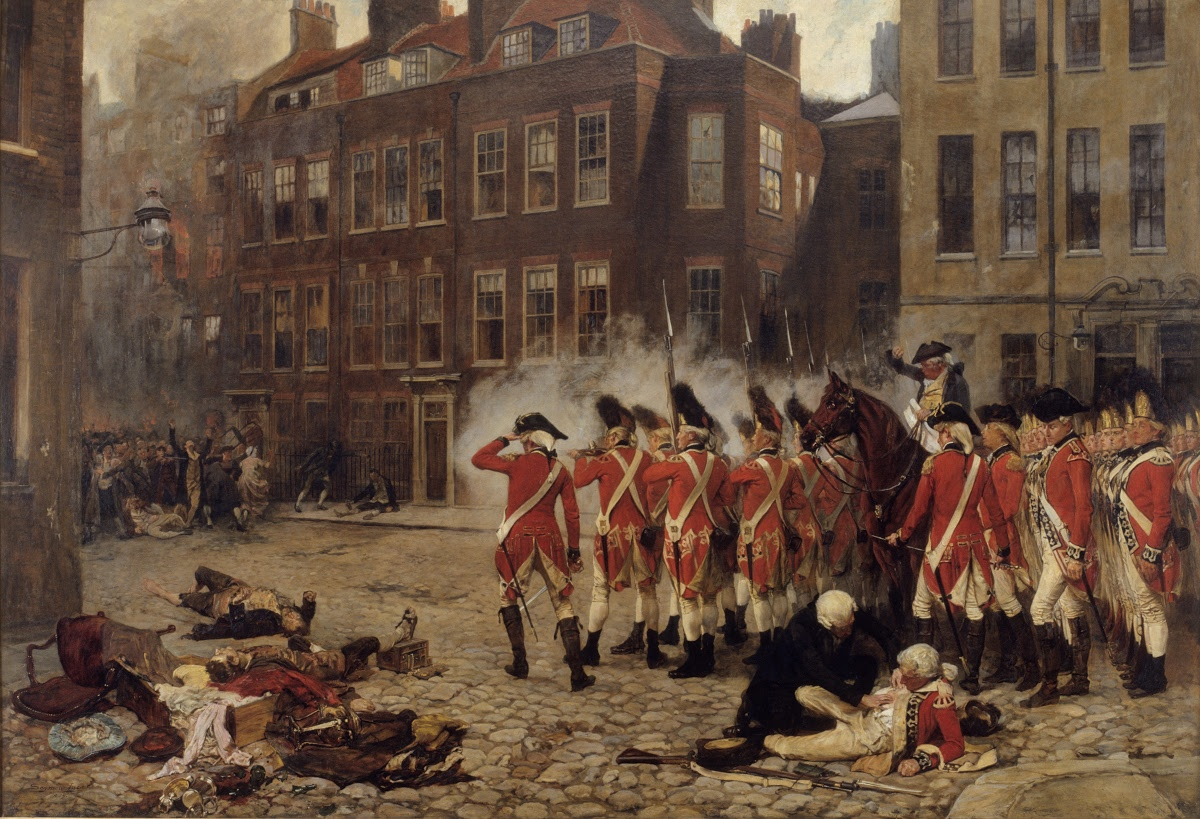
Troops firing on the Gordon Rioters in The Gordon Riots painted by John Seymour Lucas in 1879.

The Militia was called out after the outbreak of the War of American Independence when the country was threatened with invasion by the Americans' allies, France and Spain. The Surrey regiment was embodied on 26 March 1778, and that summer was at Coxheath Camp near Maidstone in Kent, which was the army's largest training camp, where the Militia were exercised as part of a division alongside Regular troops while providing a reserve in case of French invasion of South East England. In 1779 the regiment was at Gosport guarding 1500 Prisoners of War in a former seamen's hospital when they foiled an attempt to tunnel out and a plot to overcome the guards, who were increased. In 1780 some of the Surrey companies were stationed at Ringwood in Hampshire, where they were called upon to assist the Revenue officers against smuggling. In June that year the regiment (45 officers and 1040 other ranks) was deployed on the streets of London against the Gordon Riots, clearing the streets and bridges with the bayonet when parties of rioters refused to disperse. The regiment was disembodied on 28 February 1783 after the signing of the Peace of Paris.

From 1784 to 1792 the militia were assembled for their 28 days' annual training, but to save money only two-thirds of the men were actually called out each year.

=== French Revolutionary War ===
In view of the worsening international situation in late 1792 the militia was called out, even though Revolutionary France did not declare war on Britain until 1 February 1793. The Surrey Militia was embodied on 1 December 1792. The French Revolutionary Wars saw a new phase for the English militia: they were embodied for a whole generation, and became regiments of full-time professional soldiers (though restricted to service in the British Isles), which the regular army increasingly saw as a prime source of recruits. They served in coast defences, manning garrisons, guarding prisoners of war, and for internal security, while their traditional local defence duties were taken over by the Volunteers and mounted Yeomanry.

== Supplementary Militia ==
In a fresh attempt to have as many men as possible under arms for home defence in order to release regulars, the Government created the Supplementary Militia, a compulsory levy of men to be trained in their spare time, and to be incorporated in the Militia in emergency. Surrey's quota was fixed at 2460 men, a third of which was assigned as reinforcements to the 'Old Surrey Militia', as the original regiment became known. The remainder were to form two supplementary regiments. Surrey has been described as one of the 'black spots' in recruitment for the Supplementary Militia (especially compared to the Volunteers), so although the 1st Surrey Supplementary Militia was successfully raised on 14 January 1797 (and became the permanent 2nd Surrey Militia the following year) the 2nd Regiment (intended to be the 3rd Surrey Militia) never reached establishment and was disbanded. The 'Old Surrey Militia' now became the 1st Surrey Militia. (Note: Only 300 out of 1000 men summoned in the Borough (Southwark) subdivision appeared. Croydon subdivision raised 500 men for the supplementary militia, but then had to find another 200 when the 3rd Regiment was found to be short of 860 men.)

=== Napoleonic Wars ===
A peace treaty having been agreed (the Treaty of Amiens), most of the militia were disembodied in 1802, when Surrey's quota was reduced to 1336. But the Peace of Amiens broke down in 1803 before the 1st Surreys could be disembodied and the regiment remained in service; the 2nd Surreys were embodied again on 11 March 1803. On 23 April 1804 both the Surrey militia regiments were granted the title 'Royal', becoming the 1st and 2nd Royal Surrey Militia (1st and 2nd RSM).

Militia duties during the Napoleonic War were much as before: home defence and garrisons, prisoners of war, and increasingly internal security in the industrial areas where there was unrest. Increasingly the regular army regarded the militia as a source of trained men and many militiamen took the proffered bounty and transferred, leaving the militia regiments to replace them through the ballot or 'by beat of drum'.

== Surrey Local Militia ==
While the Militia were the mainstay of national defence during the Revolutionary and Napoleonic Wars, they were supplemented from 1808 by the Local Militia, which were part-time and only to be used within their own districts. These were raised to counter the declining numbers of Volunteers, (Note: When they were reformed in 1803 there were 40 Surrey Volunteer Infantry Corps. Twelve of these units had gone out of existence by 1808 and only 22 survived to 1812. Most were disbanded in March 1813 (their muskets were needed to supply the Prussian rising against Napoleon).) and if their ranks could not be filled voluntarily the Militia Ballot was employed. Surrey's quota was assessed at 3584, organised into three regiments:

- 1st Surrey Local Militia at Kingston, commanded by Sir Thomas Sutton, 1st Baronet
- 2nd Surrey Local Militia at Guildford, commanded by George Holme Sumner, MP
- 3rd Surrey Local Militia at Croydon commanded by Thomas Alcock

Because the numbers of men enrolled in the Volunteer Corps continued to decline, a new Act in 1812 increased the strength of the Local Militia. Surrey's quota was now 5344, and two new regiments were raised in 1813:

- 4th Royal Surrey Local Militia Light Infantry at Putney, commanded by Sir Joseph Mawbey, 2nd Baronet, of Botleys
- 5th Surrey Local Militia at Clapham, commanded by Thomas Gaitskell

Lieutenant-Colonel Mawbey had served in the 2nd Royal Surrey Militia while Lt-Col Gaitskell hed been a Volunteer officer. A number of the other officers were transferred from the Royal Surrey Militia, from other regiments of the Surrey Local Militia, or had been officers in the Volunteers, particularly the Bermondsey Volunteer Infantry/1st Surrey Volunteers. The local militia ballot returns for the 4th and 5th regiments show that the other ranks were drawn from Surrey parishes that were later included in the County of London or Greater London. The 4th and 5th regiments carried out their first periods of training at their headquarters in July and June 1813 respectively. They were inspected again in February 1814. The permanent staff were reduced after the abdication of Napoleon in 1814, but the regiments continued in existence until May 1816 when the Local Militia Ballot was suspended and the remaining permanent staff were paid off.

=== Ireland and Bordeaux ===
The Interchange Act 1811 allowed English militia regiments to serve in Ireland (and vice versa) for two years, and most of the 2nd RLM volunteered to serve there. It embarked on 1 August and returned in July 1813, the headquarters and right wing stationed at Dorking, the left wing at Reigate.

From November 1813 the militia were invited to volunteer for limited overseas service, primarily for garrison duties in Europe. Both the 1st and 2nd RSM provided detachments to the 'Provisional Battalions' in a Militia Brigade that embarked on 10–11 March 1814 and joined the Earl of Dalhousie's division that had occupied Bordeaux just as the war was ending. The brigade did not form part of the Army of Occupation after the abdication of Napoleon and returned to England in June.

After Napoleon's exile to Elba both Surrey regiments were disembodied on 24 June 1814. When Napoleon returned to power in 1815, leading to the short Waterloo Campaign, the 1st RSM was called out again on 29 June 1815. At the beginning of the campaign several regular regiments including the Scots Guards were hurriedly brought up to strength with militia volunteers before embarking for Belgium. There is a story that many of the Guardsmen at Waterloo were still clad in Surrey Militia uniforms. The 1st RSM was finally disembodied on 30 April 1816.

== 1852 Reforms ==
After Waterloo there was another long peace. Although officers continued to be commissioned into the militia and ballots were still held until they were suspended by the Militia Act 1829, the regiments were rarely assembled for training and the permanent staffs of sergeants and drummers (who were occasionally used to maintain public order) were progressively reduced. The 2nd RSM was only called out for training in 1820, 1821, 1825 and 1831.

The Militia of the United Kingdom was revived by the Militia Act 1852, enacted during a renewed period of international tension. As before, units were raised and administered on a county basis, and filled by voluntary enlistment (although conscription by means of the Militia Ballot might be used if the counties failed to meet their quotas). Training was for 56 days on enlistment, then for 21–28 days per year, during which the men received full army pay. Under the Act, Militia units could be embodied by Royal Proclamation for full-time home defence service in three circumstances:

1. 'Whenever a state of war exists between Her Majesty and any foreign power'.
2. 'In all cases of invasion or upon imminent danger thereof'.
3. 'In all cases of rebellion or insurrection'.

The 1st and 2nd RSM were reorganised, with most of the old officers and permanent staff pensioned off and replaced, and annual training was resumed. In 1854 the 2nd RSM began building a barracks in Guildford for the permanent staff, armoury, etc.

Under the 1852 Act a new 3rd Royal Surrey Militia was raised at Kingston on 26 March 1853.

=== Crimean War and Indian Mutiny ===
War having broken out with Russia in 1854 and an expeditionary force sent to the Crimea, the militia began to be called out for home defence. The 1st RSM was embodied for service from 28 December 1854 to 10 June 1856, and the 2nd RSM from 1 February 1855 to 12 June 1856. Large numbers of militiamen elected to transfer to the regular army. The newly raised 3rd RSM was not embodied at this time. The 1st RSM was called out again from 5 November 1857 to 22 January 1858 during the Indian Mutiny.

Thereafter the regiments were called out for their annual training. As an experiment in 1867 this was held in May at Aldershot in conjunction with the regular division stationed there. The 1st and 2nd RSM were both attached to 1st Brigade. The camp ended with a divisional field day and was considered a success, being repeated in subsequent years. In 1871 it was combined with that year's extensive Autumn Manoeuvres, and all three Surrey regiments were involved.

The Militia Reserve introduced in 1867 consisted of present and former militiamen who undertook to serve overseas in case of war.

== Cardwell and Childers Reforms ==
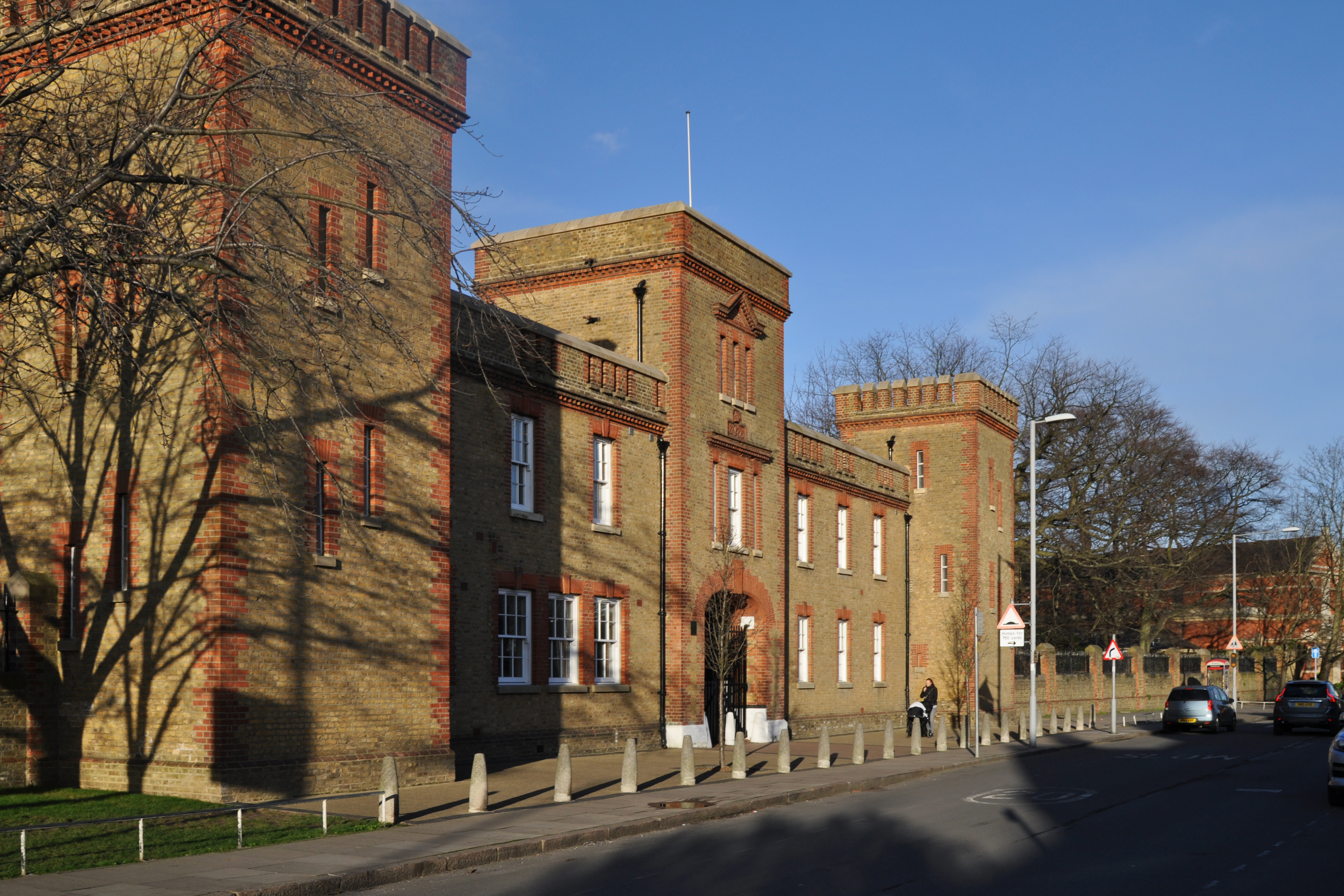
'The Keep', Kingston Barracks.

Under the 'Localisation of the Forces' scheme introduced by the Cardwell Reforms of 1872, Militia regiments were brigaded with their local regular and Volunteer battalions. The 1st and 3rd RSM were linked with the 31st (Huntingdonshire) and 70th (Surrey) Regiments of Foot in Sub-District No 47 (County of Surrey) with a shared depot at Kingston. The 2nd RSM was linked with the two battalions of the 2nd (Queen's Royal) Regiment of Foot in Sub-District No 48 (County of Surrey) at Guildford. A planned second militia regiment for the sub-district, to be numbered the 4th Surrey, was never raised. The militia now came under the War Office rather than their county lords lieutenant. Around a third of the recruits and many young officers went on to join the regular army.

A new Kingston Barracks was built for the brigade depot in 1874–5; the 1st RSM moved there from Richmond before the end of 1880. The Militia Barracks built in 1854 at Guildford had proved to be unhealthy and were now too small, so the 2nd RSM transferred to the new Stoughton Barracks built in 1876 as the depot for the Queen's.

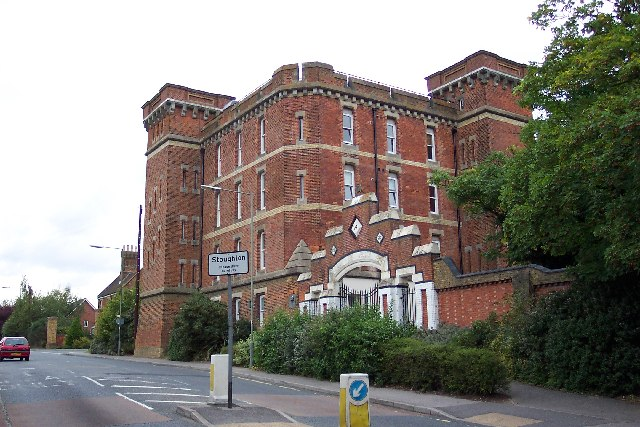
Stoughton Barracks, Guildford, now known as 'Cardwell's Keep'.

Although often referred to as brigades, the sub-districts were purely administrative organisations, but in a continuation of the Cardwell Reforms a mobilisation scheme began to appear in the Army List from December 1875. This assigned Regular and Militia units to places in an order of battle of corps, divisions and brigades for the 'Active Army', even though these formations were entirely theoretical, with no staff or services assigned. The 1st, 2nd and 3rd RSM were assigned to 2nd Brigade of 2nd Division, III Corps. The brigade would have mustered at Redhill in time of war.

The Childers Reforms of 1881 took Cardwell's reforms further, with the linked Regular regiments becoming two-battalion regiments and their linked militia formally joining as sequentially numbered battalions. On 1 July the 2nd became the Queen's (Royal West Surrey Regiment), while the 31st and 71st became the East Surrey Regiment. At the same time the 1st and 3rd RSM became the 3rd and 4th Battalions of the East Surrey and the 2nd RSM the 3rd Bn of the Queen's. Militia battalions now had a large cadre of permanent staff (about 30). Around a third of the recruits and many young officers went on to join the Regular Army.

=== Second Boer War ===
After the disasters of Black Week at the start of the Second Boer War in December 1899, most of the regular army was sent to South Africa, and many militia units were embodied to replace them for home defence and to garrison certain overseas stations. All three Surrey militia battalions were involved:

- The 3rd Queen's was embodied on 4 December 1899 and volunteered for overseas service. It embarked on 20 February 1900. After two years' service guarding lines of communication and Prisoner-of-war camps, manning blockhouse lines and escorting convoys, it was preparing to return home when the Boers invaded Namaqualand in an effort to seize the copper mines. Detachments of the 3rd Queen's and 5th Royal Warwickshires, under Lt-Col Shelton of the Queen's, together with a large number of miners, both white and Coloured, were besieged for a month at the largest mine, at Okiep. The grateful Cape Copper Company awarded its own unofficial Medal for the Defence of O'okiep to all the defenders, regardless of race or service.
- The 3rd East Surreys was embodied on 12 May 1900 and disembodied on 19 October. It was embodied again on 6 May 1901 and volunteered for overseas service. It served in South Africa from 1 July 1901 to June 1902, being disembodied on 10 October.
- The 4th East Surreys was also embodied twice, from 4 December 1899 to 12 July 1900, and then for overseas service from 24 February 1902. Although the war was coming to an end when the battalion landed in South Africa on 10 April, part of the battalion served in the Namaqualand Field Force, fighting a sharp action at Steinkopf before relieving the 3rd Queen's at Okiep. The battalion was disembodied on 25 September 1902

== Special Reserve ==
After the Boer War, there were moves to reform the Auxiliary Forces (Militia, Yeomanry and Volunteers) to take their place in the six Army Corps proposed by St John Brodrick as Secretary of State for War. However, little of Brodrick's scheme was carried out. Under the sweeping Haldane Reforms of 1908, the Militia was replaced by the Special Reserve, a semi-professional force similar to the previous Militia Reserve, whose role was to provide reinforcement drafts for regular units serving overseas in wartime:

- 3rd Bn Queens became 3rd (Reserve) Bn Queens
- 3rd Bn East Surreys became 3rd (Reserve) Bn East Surreys
- 4th Bn East Surreys became 4th (Extra Reserve) Bn East Surreys

=== World War I ===
On the outbreak of World War I the Special Reserve was embodied on 4 August and its battalions mobilised at their regimental depots. Their role throughout the war was to prepare reinforcement drafts of reservists, special reservists, recruits and returning wounded for the regular battalions serving overseas: the 1st Queen's and 1st East Surreys fought on the Western Front, the 2nd Queen's ended the war on the Italian Front, and the 2nd East Surreys on the Macedonian front. The Reserve battalions' secondary role was as garrison troops in Home Defence:

- 3rd Queen's began the war in the Medway Defences and ended it in the Sittingbourne Special Reserve Brigade;
- 3rd East Surreys spent the whole war in the Dover Garrison
- 4th East Surreys started in Plymouth and ended the war at Felixstowe in the Harwich Garrison.

=== Postwar ===
The SR resumed its old title of Militia in 1921 and then became the Supplementary Reserve in 1924, but almost all militia battalions remained in abeyance after World War I. Until 1939 they continued to appear in the Army List, but they were not activated during World War II and were all formally disbanded in April 1953.

== Heritage and ceremonial ==
=== Precedence ===
In September 1759 it had been ordered that militia regiments on service were to take precedence from the date of their arrival in camp. In 1760 this was altered to a system of drawing lots where regiments did duty together. During the War of American Independence the counties were given an order of precedence determined by ballot each year, beginning in 1778. For the Surrey Militia the positions were:

- 16th on 1 June 1778
- 5th on 12 May 1779
- 21st on 6 May 1780
- 16th on 28 April 1781
- 35th on 7 May 1782

The order balloted for at the start of the French Revolutionary War in 1793 remained in force throughout the war. Surrey's precedence of 18th applied to both regiments. Another ballot for precedence took place at the start of the Napoleonic War: Surrey was 41st.

The militia order of precedence balloted for in the Napoleonic War remained in force until 1833. In that year the King drew the lots for individual regiments and the resulting list remained in force with minor amendments until the end of the militia. The regiments raised before the peace of 1763 took the first 47 places: both Surrey regiments were deemed to predate 1763 (even though the 2nd had disappeared between 1763 and 1797), and the 2nd RSM was allotted 11th place, the 1st RSM only 20th. Formally, the regiments became the 20th, or 1st Royal Surrey Militia and 11th, or 2nd Royal Surrey Militia: most regiments paid little notice to the numbering, but the 1st RSM incorporated the numeral into its badge and the 2nd RSM did include it in the title of its later regimental history. The regiments' precedence and royal status were confirmed in 1855, when the new 3rd RSM became 118th in the order of precedence.

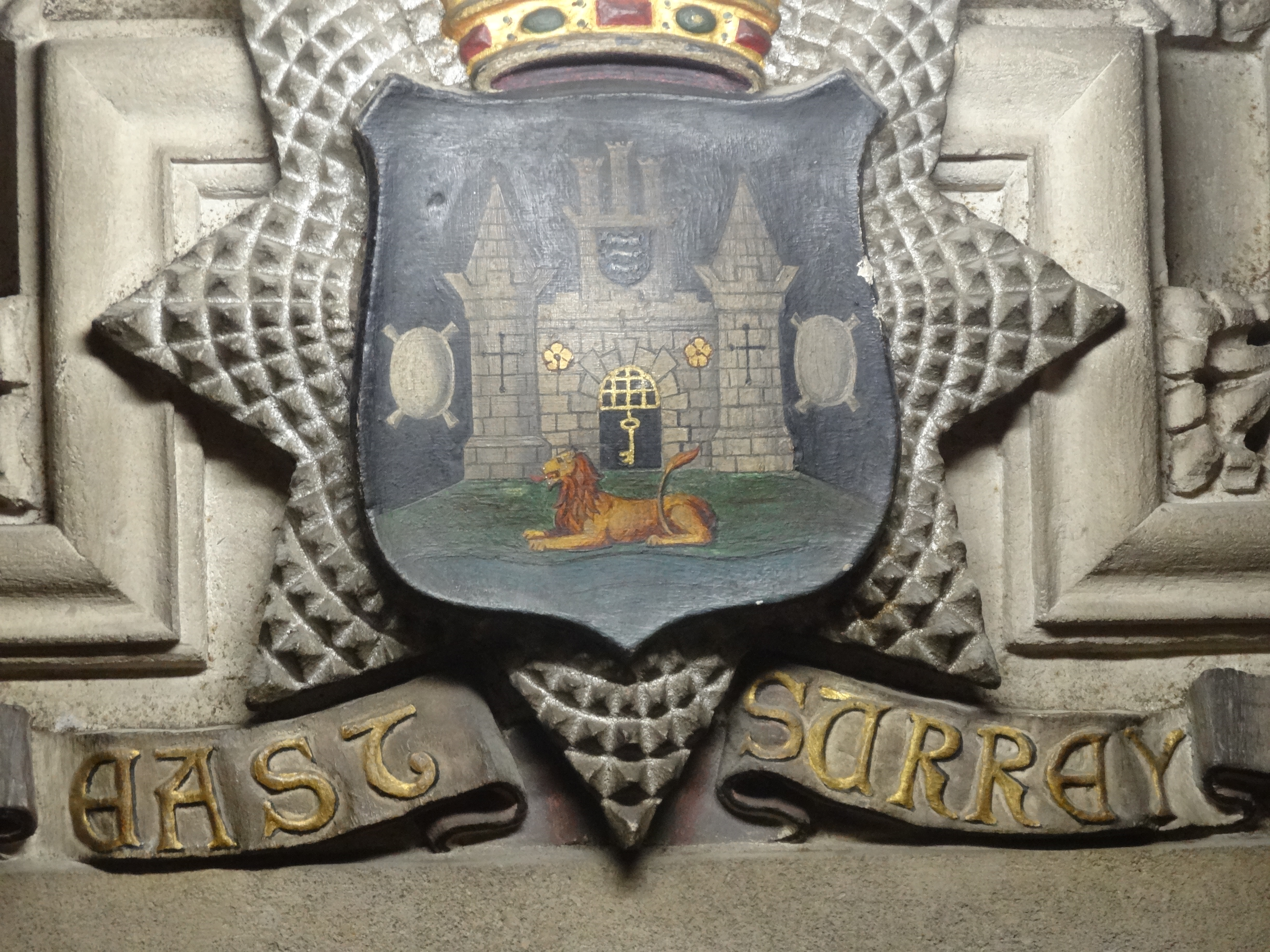
The insignia of the East Surrey Regiment in the memorial chapel at All Saints Church, Kingston upon Thames.

=== Insignia ===
The official badges of the 1st and 3rd RSM were the Coat of arms of Guildford and the star of the Order of the Garter respectively. When the East Surreys were formed, the whole regiment, including the regular battalions, adopted a new badge based on that of the two militia battalions. It consisted of the arms of Guildford superimposed on the Garter Star, but in the small shield on the tower of Guildford's castle the Royal Arms were replaced by the arms of Kingston (three fish and a letter R).

== See also ==
- Trained bands
- Militia (English)
- Militia (Great Britain)
- Militia (United Kingdom)
- Surrey Trained Bands
- 1st Royal Surrey Militia
- 2nd Royal Surrey Militia
- 3rd Royal Surrey Militia
- Queen's (Royal West Surrey Regiment)
- East Surrey Regiment
