= Frederick Charles =

Frederick Charles may refer to:

== Royalty and nobility ==
- Prince Frederick Charles of Prussia (1828–1885)
- Prince Frederick Charles of Hesse (1868–1940)
- Friedrich Karl von Schönborn (1674–1746), Bishop of Würzburg
- Frederick Charles, Duke of Württemberg-Winnental
- Frederick Charles, Count of Erbach-Limpurg (1680–1731)
- Frederick Charles, Prince of Stolberg-Gedern (1693–1767)
- Frederick Charles, Prince of Schwarzburg-Rudolstadt (1736–1793)
- Frederick Charles, Duke of Schleswig-Holstein-Sonderburg-Plön (1706–1761)

== Others ==
- Fred Charles (footballer), English association football (soccer) player active in the 1910s
- Frederick Charles (designer) (1909–?), British industrial designer

== See also ==
- Charles Frederick (disambiguation)
