= Charles Frederick (MP) =

British politician (1709–1785)

Sir Charles Frederick KB FRS (21 December 1709 – 18 December 1785) was a British politician who sat in the House of Commons from 1741 to 1784.

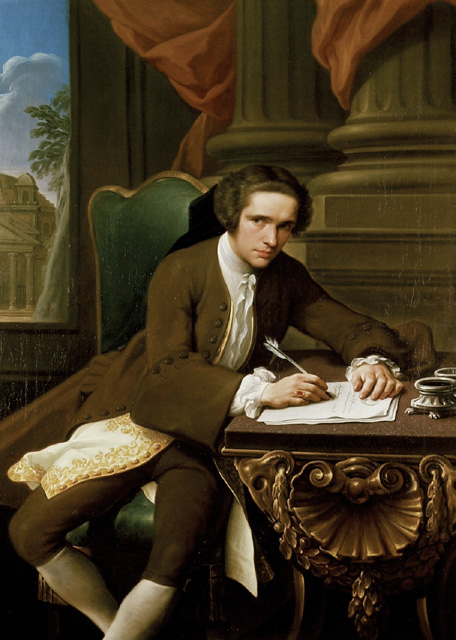
Portrait of Charles Frederick by Andrea Casali, 1738

== Early life ==
Frederick was the third son of Sir Thomas Frederick, sometime Governor of Fort St David, and his wife Mary Moncrieff, daughter of William Moncrieff and was born on 21 December 1709. He was a younger brother of Sir John Frederick, 4th Baronet. He was educated at Westminster School from 1719 to 1720 and matriculated at New College, Oxford on 19 March 1725. In 1728 he entered Middle Temple. He was elected a Fellow of the Royal Society in May 1733. He undertook a Grand Tour through Italy, Constantinople, the near East and France with his brother John from 1737 to 1739. In Rome he sat for the Portrait of Charles Frederick by Andrea Casali,

== Political career ==
Frederick was returned unopposed as Member of Parliament for New Shoreham in the 1741 general election and also in 1747. In the 1754 general election he was elected as MP for Queenborough in a contest. He was made a Knight Companion of the Order of the Bath in 1761. He was re-elected unopposed for Queenborough in 1761 and 1768 and topped the poll when the seat was contested in 1774. He was returned again for Queenborough unopposed in 1780. He was briefly Father of the House from June 1784.

Frederick was also appointed Clerk of the Deliveries in 1746 and promoted to Surveyor-General of the Ordnance in 1750. In 1782 however, he and his son were both removed from the Board of Ordnance by the then Master-General of the Ordnance, Charles Lennox, 3rd Duke of Richmond. His son, who was Architect of the Ordnance, was succeeded by James Wyatt who went on to build both the Royal Artillery Barracks and the Royal Military Academy, Woolwich.

== Family and legacy ==
Frederick married Lucy Boscawen, daughter of the first Viscount Falmouth on 18 August 1746. His great-grandson Charles Edward later succeeded to the family title as 7th Baronet.

Frederick died on 18 December 1785. Frederick Place in Woolwich is named after him.

Parliament of Great Britain
Preceded by John Frederick; John Phillipson	Member of Parliament for New Shoreham; 1741–1754; With: Thomas Brand 1741–47; Robert Bristow 1747–54	Succeeded by Robert Bristow; Richard Stratton
Preceded by Thomas Newnham; Richard Evans	Member of Parliament for Queenborough; 1754–1784; With: Sir Peircy Brett 1754–74; Sir Walter Rawlinson 1774–84	Succeeded by John Clater Aldridge; George Bowyer
Preceded by The Earl Nugent	Father of the House; 1784	Succeeded by Welbore Ellis
Military offices
Preceded by Andrew Wilkinson	Clerk of the Deliveries of the Ordnance; 1746–1750	Succeeded by Job Staunton Charlton
Preceded by Thomas Lascelles	Surveyor-General of the Ordnance; 1750–1782	Succeeded by Thomas Pelham
