= John Frederick (English cricketer) =

English cricketer

Personal information
- Full name: John St John Frederick
- Born: 6 January 1846; London, England
- Died: 10 September 1907 (aged 61); Camberley, Surrey, England
- Batting: Right-handed
- Bowling: Right-arm roundarm fast
- Relatives: Edward Frederick (nephew)

Domestic team information
- Years: Team
- 1864–1867: Oxford University
- 1864–1869: Hampshire
- 1864: Middlesex
- 1866–1869: Marylebone Cricket Club

Career statistics
Competition	First-class
Matches	25
Runs scored	635
Batting average	14.76
100s/50s	–/–
Top score	44
Balls bowled	212
Wickets	4
Bowling average	26.50
5 wickets in innings	4/45
10 wickets in match	–
Best bowling	–
Catches/stumpings	15/–
- Source: Cricinfo, 12 February 2010

John St John Frederick (6 January 1846 – 10 September 1907) was an English first-class cricketer, cricket administrator, and British Army officer.

== Life and cricket career ==
The son of the British Indian Army General Edward Frederick, he was born in London in January 1846. He was educated at Eton College, where it was noted the performed well in matches against Harrow School. where he played for the college cricket team. From there, he matriculated to Christ Church, Oxford. There, he was a member of the Oxford University Cricket Club. It was for the club that he made his debut for in first-class cricket against the Marylebone Cricket Club at Oxford in 1864. Later in the season, he played in The University Match against Cambridge University at Lord's, obtaining his blue whilst still a freshman. Alongside his five appearances for Oxford in 1864, Frederick also played in Hampshire's second-ever first-class match against Middlesex at Islington, but played for Middlesex in the return fixture at Southampton. Between these two matches, he played for the Gentlemen of Marylebone Cricket Club against the Gentlemen of Kent.

Owing to a serious knee injury he did not feature for Oxford in 1865, but did make two first-class appearances later in the season for the Gentlemen of Middlesex and the Gentlemen of Marylebone Cricket Club. He resumed playing for Oxford in 1866, making a single appearance against Southgate, in addition to playing twice for Hampshire and the Marylebone Cricket Club (MCC). The following season, he made four first-class appearances for Oxford University and one apiece for the MCC and the Gentlemen of Marylebone Cricket Club. Frederick made three final first-class appearances in 1868, playing one each for the Gentlemen of Marylebone Cricket Club, the MCC, and Hampshire. He played the majority (10) of his first-class matches for Oxford, scoring 188 runs at an average of 11.05, with a highest score of 39. For Hampshire, he scored 171 runs and made his highest first-class score of 44. For the Gentlemen of the MCC and the MCC, he scored 153 runs and 95 runs respectively. His overall first-class career consisted on 25 matches, in which he scored 635 runs at an average of 26.50. As a batsman, he was described in Scores and Biographies as a "fine, free, and powerful hitter". His four wickets all came in a single match for Hampshire against Middlesex in 1864.

Frederick later served in the British Army. In April 1870, he purchased a commission with the rank of cornet into the 6th (Inniskilling) Dragoons, before being promoted to lieutenant in November 1871. In 1876, he was appointed as aide-de-camp to the commanding officer of the Cavalry Brigade at Aldershot Garrison. He was promoted to captain in February 1878, before retiring from active service in June 1881. Frederick later served on the committee of the MCC in 1891 and from 1894 to 1898. During his second stint on the committee, Frederick proposed a change to Law 53 of the Laws of Cricket, which regarded the follow-on. However, the proposed changes to Law 53 were not adopted by the committee as a whole. In reports of MCC meetings in The Times in the 1890s, Frederick is identified as "Captain J. St J. Frederick". Frederick died at Camberley on 10 September 1907 after what was described as "a long illness". The death notice records that he was a member of the Junior Carlton Club. His nephew, Edward Frederick, was also a first-class cricketer.

Frederick married in 1890 Mary Theresa Caroline Alice, Baroness von Donop, daughter of Baron de Reuter. She died on 22 February 1895.
