= Sir Thomas Sutton, 1st Baronet =

English militia commander and politician

Sir Thomas Sutton, 1st Baronet (c.1755–1813) was an English militia commander and politician, Member of Parliament for Surrey in 1812–13.

== Life ==
He was the son of Thomas Sutton (died 1789) of Molesey, Surrey, and his wife Jane Hankey, daughter of Alderman Thomas Hankey. He matriculated in 1773 at Magdalen College, Oxford, graduating B.A. in 1777, M.A. in 1780. He was called to the bar at the Middle Temple in 1782. The Trial of Mrs. Henrietta Arabin (1786), on the King's Bench case brought by William St Julien Arabin against his wife for adultery with Sutton, describes him as a major in the Horse Guards Regiment.

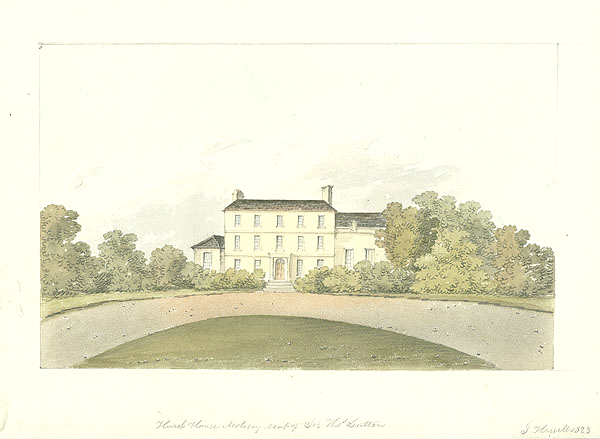
Hurst House, Molesey, residence of Sir Thomas Sutton, 1823 watercolour

Sutton was High Sheriff of Surrey in 1796–7, and commissioned with the rank of major in the 2nd Royal Surrey Militia in 1797; and supported the Pitt administration against a Whig petition at a Surrey county meeting that year. At the beginning of the 19th century, he was jointly lord of the manor of East Molesey, with Sir Beaumont Hotham, his uncle by marriage to Susanna Hankey, daughter of Alderman Hankey and sister of Jane Hankey.

Sutton rose to be militia lieutenant-colonel in 1800. He was created a baronet on 5 March, 1806. Mary Berry had dinner with Sutton and his wife on 21 September 1809. She wrote in her journal: "His conversation always remarkably sensible, and liberal-minded, and to the purpose." In the first days of the operation of the Regency Act 1811, the Duke of Clarence stated at a large dinner given by Sutton at Molesley in February 1811 that "The King is as mad as ever, but we have now shut the door and turned the key upon him."

Standing in the two-member Surrey constituency in 1812 general election, Sutton was backed by Sir John Frederick, 5th Baronet, another Surrey Militia officer, and Viscount Cranley. He hoped to keep out the radical Sir Thomas Turton, 1st Baronet. He was standing as a friend of Lord Liverpool, and his main concern before letting his name go forward was that the 11th Duke of Norfolk, a proponent of Catholic rights, would fund Turton's campaign. In the event, known as an associate of Lord Moira and with the approval of George Spencer, 2nd Earl Spencer, he was comfortably elected in second place, behind the Tory George Holme Sumner, ahead of Turton backed by Sir Joseph Mawbey, 2nd Baronet and Sir Mark Wood, 1st Baronet. In parliament in 1813 he opposed Catholic relief while the Napoleonic Wars continued.

== Family ==
Sutton married in 1790 Lucy, daughter of Thomas Assheton Smith (1752–1828). They had two daughters. The baronetcy became extinct on Sutton's death on 6 November 1813. Of the daughters, Lucy married George Berkeley. The other daughter, Caroline Mary Selina (Carolina), married in 1816 Angelo D'Ambrosio (1774–1822), a Neapolitan general and diplomat, who participated in the 1820 revolution.

Sutton's elder brother John Sutton RN married Frances Hotham, daughter of Beaumont Hotham in a cousin marriage.

== Notes ==
Parliament of the United Kingdom
Preceded by George Holme Sumner; Samuel Thornton	Member of Parliament for Surrey; 1812–1813; With: George Holme Sumner	Succeeded by George Holme Sumner; Samuel Thornton
Baronetage of the United Kingdom
New creation	Baronet (of the Navy); 1806–1813	Extinct
Preceded by Cholmley baronets	Sutton baronets of Moulsey; 5 March 1806	Succeeded by Louis baronets
