= Chapple Norton =

British soldier and politician (1746–1818)

General The Honourable Chapple Norton

Member of the Great Britain Parliament for Guildford
- In office 1784–1790
- In office 1796–1800

Member of Parliament for Guildford
- In office 1801–1806
- In office 1807–1812

Personal details
- Born: 2 April 1746
- Died: 19 March 1818 (aged 71) Wonersh, England, United Kingdom
- Parent(s): Fletcher Norton, 1st Baron Grantley; Grace Chapple

Military service
- Allegiance: United Kingdom
- Branch/service: British Army
- Years of service: c. 1763 – c. 1802
- Rank: General
- Battles/wars: Battle of Young's House

General John Chapple Norton (2 April 1746 – 19 March 1818) was a British Army officer who served in the American Revolutionary War and who later became a Member of Parliament for Guildford.

== Early life ==
John Chapple Norton was born on 2 April 1746 to Fletcher Norton, 1st Baron Grantley and Grace Chapple.

== Military career ==
He joined the British army, becoming a captain in the 19th Foot in 1763. After serving with the regiment in Gibraltar he transferred to the Royal Regiment of Foot in 1769, before being appointed a lieutenant-colonel in the 2nd Foot Guards. He served with the Foot Guards in North America during the War of Independence and was involved in several of the actions there, including leading the attack on Young's House.

In 1795 he was rewarded with the colonelcy of the 81st Regiment of Foot and in 1797, he was promoted lieutenant-general and transferred to the colonelcy of the 56th Foot. In 1802 he was made general and soon afterwards Governor of Charlemont, the Irish fort.

== Political career ==
He represented Guildford, Surrey as their Member of Parliament from 1784 to 1790, from 1796 to 1806 and from 1807 to 1812.

== Later life and death ==
He died unmarried at the family seat of Wonersh Park in Surrey in 1818.

Parliament of Great Britain
Preceded by George Onslow; Hon. William Norton	Member of Parliament for Guildford; 1784–1790; With: Viscount Cranley	Succeeded by Viscount Cranley; George Holme Sumner
Preceded by Viscount Cranley; George Holme Sumner	Member of Parliament for Guildford; 1796–1800; With: Viscount Cranley	Parliament of Great Britain abolished
Parliament of the United Kingdom
Preceded by Self in Parliament of Great Britain	Member of Parliament for Guildford; 1801–1806; With: Viscount Cranley	Succeeded by Thomas Cranley Onslow; George Holme Sumner
Preceded by Hon. Thomas Cranley Onslow; George Holme Sumner	Member of Parliament for Guildford; 1807–1812; With: Hon. Thomas Cranley Onslow	Succeeded by Hon. Thomas Cranley Onslow; Arthur Onslow
Military offices
Preceded by Winter Blathwayte	Colonel of the 81st Regiment of Foot; 1795–1797	Succeeded by Gordon Forbes
Preceded by Samuel Hulse	Colonel of the 56th (West Essex) Regiment of Foot; 1797–1818	Succeeded by Sir John Murray
