= Listed buildings in Loppington =

Loppington is a civil parish in Shropshire, England. It contains 42 listed buildings that are recorded in the National Heritage List for England. Of these, one is listed at Grade I, the highest of the three grades, and the others are at Grade II, the lowest grade. The parish contains the village of Loppington and smaller settlements, including Burlton, and is otherwise rural. Most of the listed buildings are houses and associated structures, cottages, farmhouses, and farm buildings, most of which are timber framed, and date from the 16th to the early 18th century. The other listed buildings include a church, a sundial and tombs in its churchyard, and a pound,

== Key ==
Grade	Criteria
I	Buildings of exceptional interest, sometimes considered to be internationally important
II	Buildings of national importance and special interest

== Buildings ==
Name and location	Photograph	Date	Notes	Grade
St Michael's Church; 52.85837°N 2.78618°W		14th century	The church has been extended and partly rebuilt, and in 1870 it was restored. It is built in sandstone with a tile roof, and consists of a nave, a south aisle, a south porch, a chancel, and a west tower. The tower has three stages, diagonal buttresses, a stair turret at the northeast, an embattled parapet with gargoyles, and a pyramidal roof with a weathercock. The nave and chancel are in Decorated style, and the tower and south aisle are Perpendicular.	I
Holly Cottage; 52.85797°N 2.78853°W	—	16th century	The cottage has been restored and extended. It is timber framed with cruck construction on a high brick plinth, and has a tile roof. There is one storey and an attic, and one bay. The windows are casements, and there is a true cruck truss exposed in each gable end.	II
Ruewood Farmhouse; 52.84441°N 2.74790°W	—	Mid 16th century	The farmhouse, later a private house, was extended in about 1654, and again in the 19th century. It is timber framed with rendered infill, some rebuilding in red brick, and a tile roof. There is one storey and an attic, with two original bays, and another wing added to the right. It has a timber-framed gabled porch on the front, a casement window with a segmental head to the left, a fixed window to the right, and two gabled eaves dormers.	II
The Old House; 52.86313°N 2.79486°W	—	16th century	A farmhouse, later a private house, it was extended in the 18th century. The house is timber framed with cruck construction, brick infill, and a tile roof. There is an L-shaped plan, consisting of a hall range with one storey and an attic, and a cross-wing to the right, projecting to the rear, with two storeys. The windows are casements with lattice glazing, and in the hall range is a gabled eaves dormer and a lean-to porch. Also inside the hall range are two true cruck trusses.	II
Holywellmoor; 52.87376°N 2.79950°W	—	Late 16th century	A farmhouse, later a private house, it is timber framed with red brick and rendered infill, and has a tile roof with gables and finials. There is one storey and an attic, and an L-shaped plan, consisting of the hall range and a cross-wing. Some windows are casements, and others are fixed.	II
The Nook Farmhouse; 52.85905°N 2.78440°W	—	c. 1600	The farmhouse is timber framed with red brick infill on a sandstone plinth, and has a tile roof with gables and pointed finials. There are two storeys and attics, and an H-shaped plan, consisting of a hall range flanked by cross-wings. The upper floor is continuously jettied with a moulded bressumer. The windows are casements, and there is a gabled eaves dormer on the hall range, and a timber-framed porch.	II
Hatchetts Farmhouse; 52.82962°N 2.80569°W	—	16th or 17th century	The farmhouse is basically timber framed, encased or replaced in red brick, partly rendered, and has tile roofs. There is an L-shaped plan, consisting of a hall range with two storeys and a dentil eaves cornice, and a cross-wing at the rear to the right with one storey and an attic. The windows are casement windows, and there is a French window in the hall range and a gabled eaves dormer in the cross-wing. On the front is a round-arched brick porch.	II
Bull Ring Cottage and Hall Cottage; 52.85903°N 2.78721°W	—	Early 17th century	A house that was extended and partly rebuilt in the 19th century, it has been divided into two dwellings. The house is timber framed with brick infill, the extensions and rebuilding are in red brick, and the roof is tiled. There is an L-shaped plan, consisting of a hall range with one storey and an attic, and a cross-wing on the right with two storeys. The windows are casements, and there are gabled eaves dormers in both parts.	II
Spenford House; 52.86007°N 2.78611°W		Early 17th century	The house was extended in the 18th century. The original part, forming a cross-wing, is timber framed with brick infill, two storeys and an attic. The extension at the rear, forming a hall range, is in brick and has two storeys. The roof is tiled, and the windows are casements. The upper floor and attic of the cross-wing are jettied with bressumers on brackets, on the gables are pointed finials, and on the front is a gabled porch. In the hall range is a band and three plain pilasters, and on the roof is a group of five chimney stacks.	II
Burlton Hall; 52.83005°N 2.80515°W	—	17th century	The house was remodelled and much extended in the late 19th century. It is timber framed with red brick infill, tile roofs, two storeys, and attics. The original part of the house has an L-shaped plan, consisting of a hall and a cross-wing. This is to the left, and the extensions to the right have multiple gables. The ornamental timber porch is gabled, it has an inscription, and incorporates some Jacobean panelling. Above it is a bracketed oriel window, the other windows are casements, and in the cross-wing is a niche containing a statue.	II
Grange Farm Cottage; 52.85805°N 2.78653°W	—	17th century	The house was remodelled, altered and extended in the 19th and 20th centuries. It is basically timber framed, largely replaced in red brick, and has a tile roof. There is an L-shaped plan, consisting of a hall range with one storey and an attic and two bays, and a later projecting cross-wing on the left with two storeys and a dentilled band. The windows are casements, some with segmental heads, and in the hall range are two gabled eaves dormers.	II
The Blacksmith's Arms; 52.85736°N 2.78936°W	—	17th century	The house, at one time an inn, is timber framed, largely replaced by brick, and has a thatched roof. It has one storey and an attic, originally with two bays, a bay was added to the right in the 19th century, and this has a dentilled eaves cornice. The windows are casements, and in the original part are two eyebrow dormers.	II
Church Farmhouse; 52.85841°N 2.78566°W	—	c. 1664	The farmhouse was originally mainly timber framed, and this has been largely replaced in brick. The roofs are tiled with coped verges. It has an L-shaped plan consisting of a hall range with one storey and an attic, and a dentil eaves cornice, and a cross-wing of three storeys with bands. The windows are casements, some with segmental heads, and in the hall range is a dated half-dormer with a jettied bressumer. Above the doorway is a gabled hood, and at the rear are a lean-to timber-framed dairy and a brick wash house.	II
Grafton Farmhouse; 52.84667°N 2.77158°W	—	Mid to late 17th century	The farmhouse was remodelled and extended in the 18th century and later. It is basically timber framed, partly rendered and partly encased in red brick, with extensions in red brick, and it has a tile roof. The house originally had two gabled bays, with extensions added on both sides. There are two storeys and attics, and dentil eaves cornices in the extensions. The windows are casements, and there is a gabled porch.	II
Laburnum Cottage; 52.86019°N 2.78646°W	—	Mid to late 17th century	The cottage is timber framed with red brick infill, and has a tile roof. There is one storey and an attic, and three bays. In the centre is a gabled porch, which is flanked by Gothic-style casement windows, and above are gabled eaves dormers.	II
Barn northeast of Church Farmhouse; 52.85855°N 2.78546°W	—	Late 17th century	The barn was partly rebuilt in the 18th century. It is partly timber framed with weatherboarding, and partly in red brick, and has a slate roof. There are three bays, with a loft inserted in the 18th century. It contains double doors with twin eaves hatches above, and a wide vehicle entrance with a segmental arch to the right.	II
Wall, Church Farmhouse; 52.85821°N 2.78578°W	—	Late 17th century	The wall encloses the garden of the farmhouse on the north, west and south sides, and on two sides forms the boundary of the churchyard of St Michael's Church. It is in red brick, and has coped stone verges.	II
Barn, Parish Farm; 52.85940°N 2.78802°W	—	Late 17th century	The barn is timber framed with weatherboarding, and has a corrugated iron roof. There are two levels and three bays. The barn contains a former threshing entrance, doors, and eaves hatches.	II
Sundial base 52.85822°N 2.78618°W	—	1695	The sundial and base is in the churchyard of St Michael's Church. It is in sandstone, and consists of a circular baluster with a capital and base. It is 1.34 metres (4 ft 5 in) high, and stands on a circular step about 1.25 metres (4 ft 1 in) in diameter. On the top is a modern bronze plate.	II
Burlton Grange Farmhouse; 52.84061°N 2.80470°W	—	c. 1700	The farmhouse was extended in the early 19th century by the addition of a higher block at the front facing the road. The house is in red brick with tile roofs, and has two storeys. The front has three bays, a Doric porch with an entablature, a rectangular fanlight above the door, and sash windows with wedge lintels. The rear wing has a dentil eaves cornice and casement windows, those in the ground floor with segmental heads.	II
Noneley Hall Farmhouse; 52.84671°N 2.77401°W	—	c. 1700	The farmhouse was extended in the 19th century. It is in red brick on a chamfered stone plinth, with rusticated quoins, a modillion eaves cornice, and a tile roof with coped verges. There are two storeys with attics, and an H-shaped plan consisting of a single-bay range and two gabled cross-wings, and there is an additional gabled wing at the rear. The windows are casements; the window over the central doorway has a round head with a pediment above, and the windows in the gable ends have wedge lintels.	II
Loppington Hall; 52.85954°N 2.78640°W		Early 18th century	The house was extended in the 19th century. It is in red brick with corner pilasters, a stepped cornice, a coped parapet ramped up to the corners, and a hipped tile roof. There are three storeys, five bays, and later gabled extensions at the rear. The central doorway has fluted Tuscan pilasters, with dentilled capitals and imposts, an open segmental pediment, and above the door is a semicircular fanlight. The windows are sashes, those in the top floor being horizontally-sliding.	II
Dovecote east of Loppington Hall; 52.85925°N 2.78559°W	—	Early 18th century	The dovecote is in red brick on a chamfered sandstone plinth, and has a pyramidal slate roof. It has a square plan, two levels and a band. In the upper level is a segmental-headed window, and on the top is an open lantern with a pyramidal cap and a pointed finial.	II
Garden wall, Loppington Hall; 52.85946°N 2.78724°W	—	Early 18th century	The wall forms a rectangular enclosure on three sides of the garden to the southeast of the hall. It is in red brick with pilasters and sandstone coping.	II
Barn, The Nook Farm; 52.85885°N 2.78428°W	—	Early 18th century	The barn is timber framed with red brick infill on a sandstone plinth, with weatherboarding on the right and to the rear, red brick in the gable ends, and a corrugated iron roof. It contains double doors, and an inserted vehicle entrance.	II
Barn, Pear Tree Farm; 52.85896°N 2.78805°W	—	Early 18th century	The barn is timber framed with red brick infill, and has two levels, the upper level weatherboarded. The gable ends have been rebuilt in red brick. The barn has a gabled eaves dormer and an eaves hatch.	II
Outbuilding northwest of Burlton Hall; 52.83020°N 2.80513°W	—	Early to mid 18th century	The outbuilding is in red brick with a tile roof and crow-stepped gables. It has a square plan, one storey, and later coped piers to the apex and corners. The outbuilding contains one door.	II
Wall east of Hatchetts Farmhouse; 52.82950°N 2.80555°W	—	Mid 18th century	The wall is in red brick with sandstone coping. It flanks the curve of the road for about 40 metres (130 ft), and is ramped up in front of the farmhouse.	II
The Grove Farmhouse and walls 52.82801°N 2.80544°W	—	Mid 18th century	The farmhouse was remodelled in the 19th century and later extended. It is in red brick on a sandstone plinth, with chamfered quoins, an eaves cornice, and a hipped slate roof. There are two storeys, and an L-shaped plan with a later wing added at the rear. The front has three bays, the windows are casements, and there are two mock arrow loops. In the centre is a gabled porch and a doorway with a Gothic fanlight. To the front and rear of the house are sandstone walls ending in rectangular piers, and the front section has mock arrow loops, and a rectangular turret in the centre.	II
Group of chest and table tombs 52.85829°N 2.78620°W		Late 18th century	The tombs are in the churchyard of St Michael's Church, and have various dates up to about 1830. They are in sandstone and each has a rectangular plan. The chest tombs have moulded plinths and capping, and the table tombs consist of plain top ledgers on squat rectangular pillars. Some of the chest tombs have fluted pilasters and decorated corner spandrels. The most elaborate tomb is to the memory of Henry Betty, who died in 1811, and this a chest tomb with tapering sides and surmounted by an urn.	II
Malt Kiln Farmhouse; 52.84778°N 2.81003°W	—	Late 18th century	The farmhouse is in red brick with a dentilled eaves cornice and a slate roof. There are two storeys and three bays. The central doorway has pilasters, a rectangular fanlight, and a flat hood, and the windows are casements with segmental heads.	II
The Shayes Farmhouse; 52.85003°N 2.77618°W	—	Late 18th century	A red brick farmhouse with a dentil eaves cornice and a tile roof. It has two storeys and an attic, and an L-shaped plan, consisting of a main block of three bays and a lower kitchen range at the rear. The central doorway has pilasters and a flat hood, and above it is blind segmental-headed opening. The windows are sashes with wedge lintels, and there are two gabled eaves dormers.	II
Woodgate and wall 52.85241°N 2.79725°W	—	Late 18th century	The house, later a farmhouse, was extended in the 19th century. It is in red brick with pilasters, a moulded eaves cornice, and a tile roof with ornamental cresting. There are two storeys and an attic, a front of six bays, two gabled extensions at the rear, and a lower block to the right. On the front is a pedimented porch, and above the door is a blind semicircular fanlight. The windows are sashes with moulded surrounds, and there are two hip roofed eaves dormers with decorative ceramic finials. In the rear extension is a bow window with a conical roof, and attached to the extension on the right is a red brick wall with sandstone coping, ramped down in three sections.	II
Stables, Woodgate; 52.85268°N 2.79662°W	—	Late 18th century	The stables are in red brick on a sandstone plinth, with a dentilled eaves cornice, and a hipped slate roof. There is a rectangular plan and two levels. The stables contain two square openings below the eaves, a wide elliptical vehicle arch, and stable doors.	II
Churchyard wall 52.85850°N 2.78652°W	—	Late 18th or early 19th century	The wall extends along the north and west sides of the churchyard of St Michael's Church, which originally had a roughly circular shape. It is in sandstone and has a triangular coping. At the northeast corner is a stile.	II
Village Pound; 52.85860°N 2.78595°W	—	Late 18th or 19th century (probable)	The pound is in sandstone and has a square plan. The wall on the west side is missing.	II
The Old Vicarage; 52.85807°N 2.78691°W	—	Early 19th century	The vicarage, later a private house, was a remodelling of an earlier house. It is in brick with a dentil eaves cornice and a slate roof. There are two storeys, three bays, and earlier service ranges at the rear. The central doorway has pilasters, a rectangular fanlight, and a plain entablature, and the windows are sashes.	II
Mill Farmhouse; 52.83997°N 2.80486°W	—	c. 1830	The farmhouse is in red brick with a hipped tile roof, two storeys and a front of three bays. The central entrance has a Doric porch, and above the double doors is a rectangular fanlight. The windows are sashes with wedge lintels, and in the left return is a full height canted bay window.	II
Pump and basin, Burlton Grange Farm; 52.84077°N 2.80479°W	—	Mid 19th century	The pump and basin are in the garden to the north of the farmhouse. The pump is in cast iron, and has a fluted shaft with an elaborate foliated cap and finial, a decorated spout, and a slightly curved handle. The basin is in stone, and is rectangular.	II
Village pump and basin 52.85984°N 2.78676°W	—	Mid to late 19th century	The pump and basin stand in an enclosure. The pump is in cast iron, and has a plain shaft with a decorated cap, a plain spout and a slightly curved handle. The basin is in stone, and is rectangular.	II
Farm building, wall and gateway, Burlton Hall; 52.83052°N 2.80470°W	—	Late 19th century	The farm building is in red brick and has a slate roof with sandstone coping. Its east wall contains 14 rows of pigeon nesting holes and ledges, above which is a miniature gabled dovecote. The wall attached to it at right angles to the northeast contains a gateway with a pointed arch and moulded chimney-like piers.	II
Outbuildings and walls, Burlton Hall; 52.83028°N 2.80515°W	—	Late 19th century	Red brick walls link the hall to outbuildings of various types and functions, including a dovecote. The buildings are also in red brick and have slate roofs. Their features include chimney-like finials, a round-headed niche containing a bell, dentil bands, crow-stepped gables, and some are decorated with lozenge and X-shapes. The windows are casements.	II
