= Andrea Casali =

Italian painter (1705–1784)

Andrea Casali (17 November 1705 (Note: Some sources (e.g. Bryan and Hobbes) erroneously claim a birthdate of 1720.) – 7 September 1784) was an Italian painter of the Rococo period. He was also an art dealer in England.

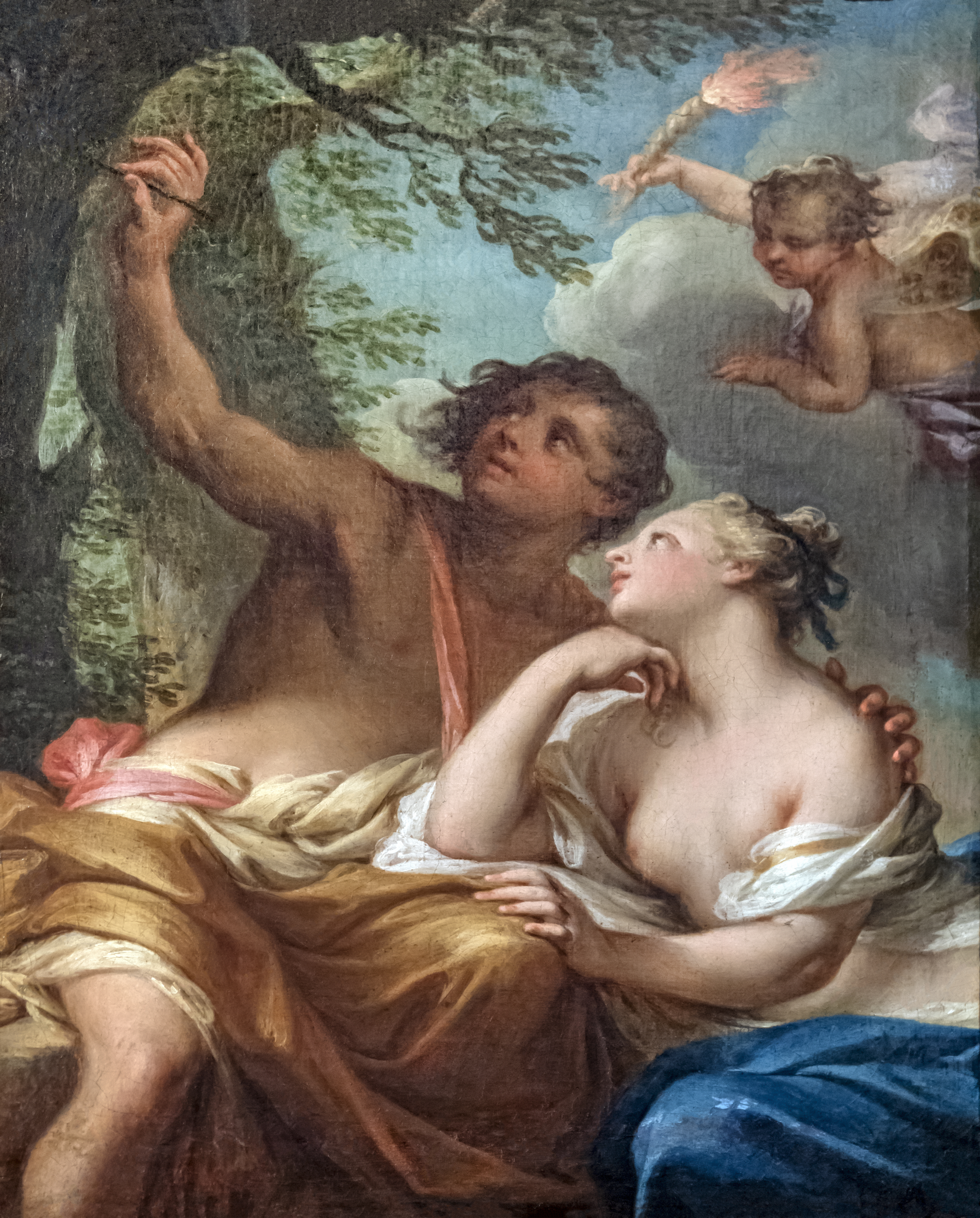
Angelica e Medoro, Bemberg Fondation Toulouse

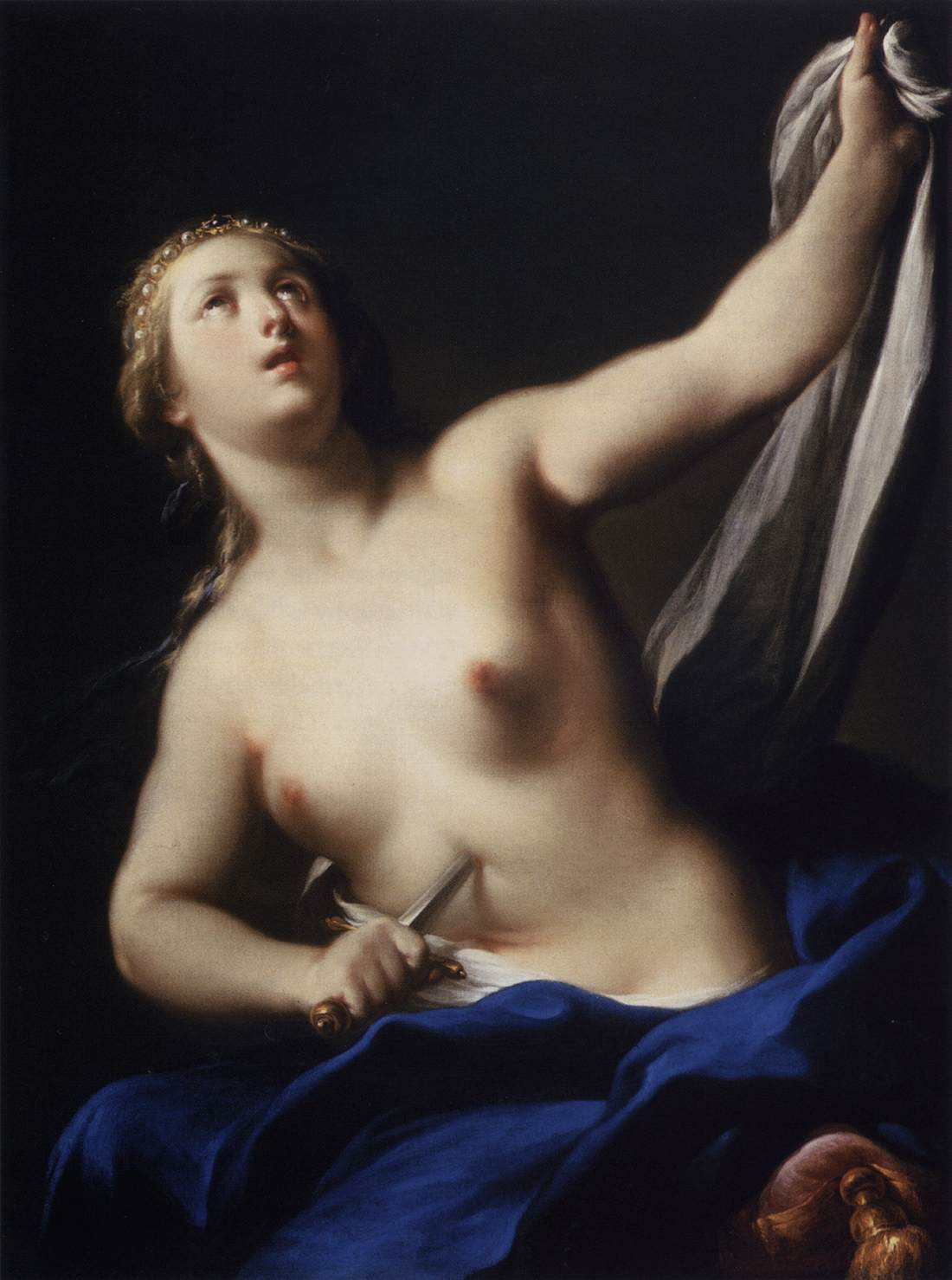
Lucretia, Museum of Fine Arts (Budapest)

He was born in Civitavecchia in the Papal States and studied under Sebastiano Conca and Francesco Trevisani. Until 1738 he was a decorative painter of Roman churches and in 1729 was made a Knight of the Golden Spur; for this in England he would be called "the Chevalier Casali". He travelled to England in 1741 and stayed there for twenty-five years. He was a teacher to James Durno. Among his English patrons were Thomas Coke, Earl of Leicester (1697–1759), and Alderman William Beckford. He left England in 1766, after which he lived for some years in Rome, where he died in 1784.

== Works ==
(partial list):

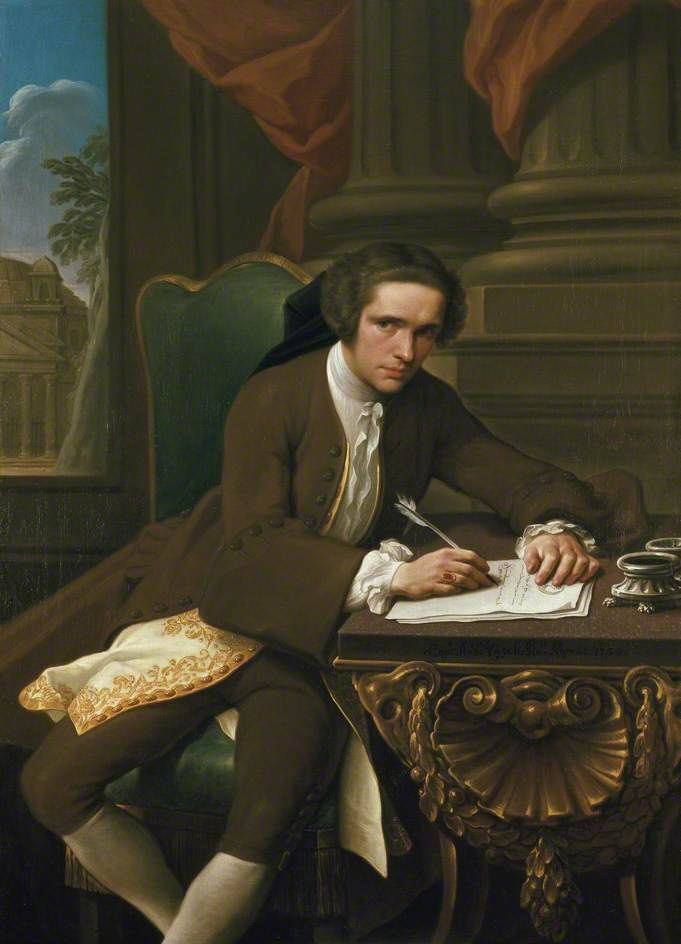
Portrait of Charles Frederick, 1738

- The Virgin and Child, after Raphael, etching, Fine Arts Museums of San Francisco
- St. Edward the Martyr, Burton Constable Hall, East Riding of Yorkshire, United Kingdom
- Lucretia lamenting her disgrace, 1761, Musée du Louvre, Paris
- Innocence Triumphant, etching, Fine Arts Museums of San Francisco
- Adoration of the Magi, 1750, Foundling Hospital Museum, London
- Allegory of Autumn, c. 1760, Leeds Museums and Galleries, United Kingdom
- Allegory of Summer, 1760, Holburne Museum of Art, Bath, United Kingdom
- Portrait of Charles Frederick, 1738, Ashmolean Museum, University of Oxford, United Kingdom
- Lucrezia, Museum of Fine Arts, Budapest
- Madonna del Rosario, 1731, Palazzo Vescovile, Rieti
- Annunciazione and Adorazione dei Magi, 1738, Accademia Albertina, Turin
- Lot ubriacato dalle figlie, collection privée, New York
- Martirio di Santa Cristina, 1732, collegiata de Bolsena, Viterbo
- Angelica e Medoro, Bemberg Fondation Toulouse
- Bacco e Arianna, 1755, Grundy Art Gallery, Blackpool, United Kingdom
- Galatea, Art Gallery, Glasgow, United Kingdom
- Adorazione dei Magi, Staatsgalerie Stuttgart, Germany
- Ercole e Onfale, private collection, Rome
- Lot e le figlie and Susanna e i vecchioni, collection Lemme, Rome
- Il banchetto di Antonio e Cleopatra, private collection, London
- Ester e Assuero, collection Cei, Florence
- Allegoria delle Arti e delle Scienze, Dyrham Park, South Gloucestershire, United Kingdom
- Visione di San Felice di Valois and Scena della vita di San Michele, collection of the marquis de Lozoya, Madrid
- Continenza di Scipione, Rhode Island School of Design Museum, New York, United States
- San Giovanni Battista in preghiera, Ringling Museum, Sarasota Florida, United States
- Marco Antonio e Cleopatra, royal palace of the Granja de San Ildefonso, Segovia, Spain
- Portrait of Lady Anne Howard, 1759, Ingatestone, Essex, United Kingdom
- William Beckford fanciullo, 1765, Hamilton collection, Scotland
- Cristo morto compianto dagli angeli, 1737, Catedrale San Liberatore, Magliano Sabina, Rieti
- La famiglia di Dario davanti Alessandro Magno, private collection, Amsterdam
- Adorazione dell'agnello mistico da parte dei ventiquattro anziani dell'Apocalisse, 1735, Musée du Barocco, Palazzo Chigi, Ariccia

== Sources ==
- Bryan, Michael (1886). Robert Edmund Graves (ed.). Dictionary of Painters and Engravers, Biographical and Critical. Vol. I: A-K. London: George Bell and Sons. pp. 245–246.
- Coen, Paolo, Il mercato dei dipinti a Roma nel diciottesimo secolo, 2 vols., Florence, Leo S. Olschki, 2010, (publishes the two auctions held by Casali in London and his inventory of goods]
- Hobbes, James R. (1849). Picture collector's manual adapted to the professional man, and the amateur. London: T&W Boone. pp. 45–46.
- Laing, Alastair (March 1994). "Masterpieces from Yorkshire Houses". York City Art Gallery. The Burlington Magazine, p. 196.
