= Battle of Young's House =

American Revolutionary War battle

Battle of Young's House (Youngs Corners)
- Part of the American Revolutionary War
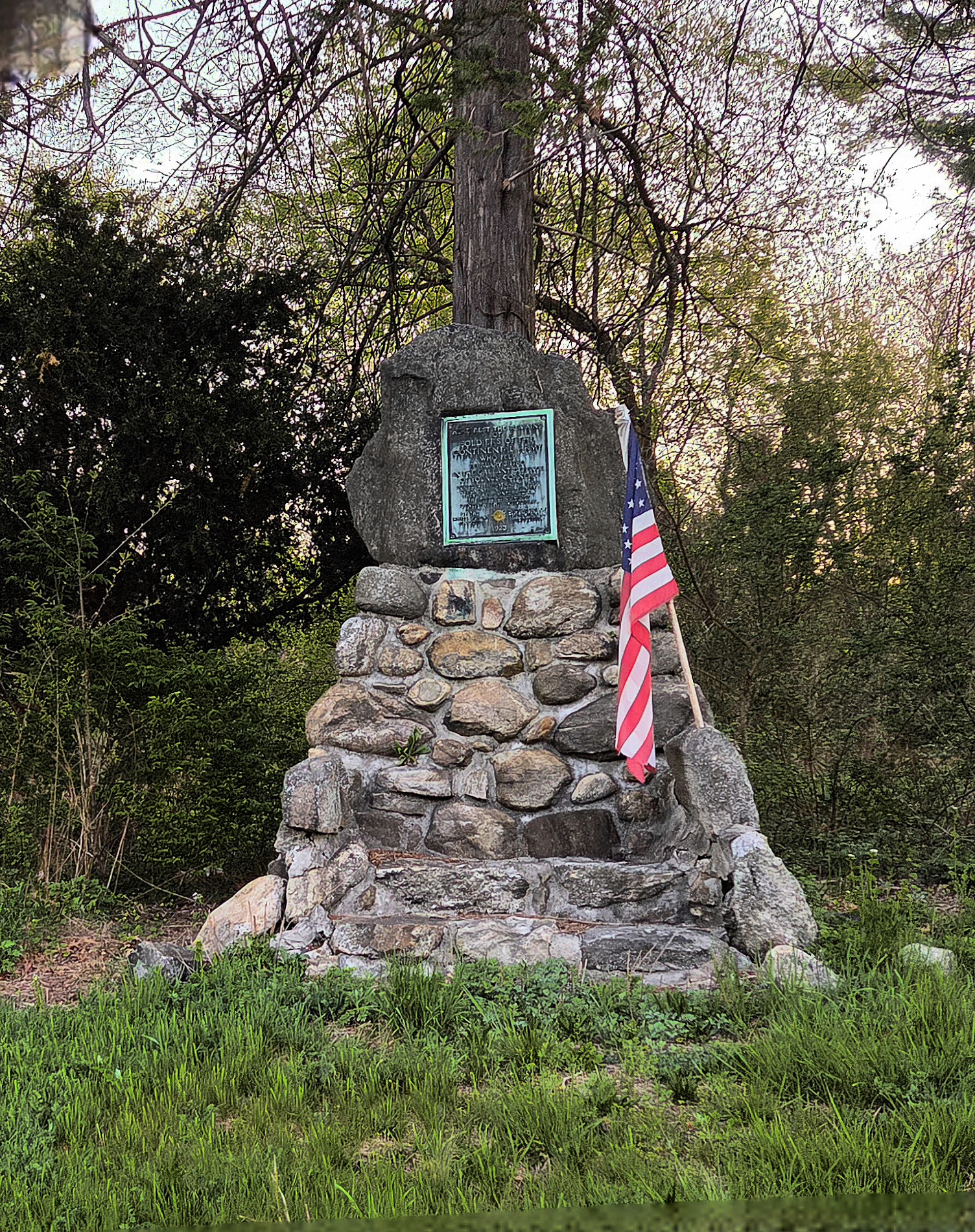
- Monument at the Battle of Young's House site
Date	February 3, 1780
Location	Four Corners, now known as Valhalla, a hamlet in Mount Pleasant, New York 41°4′27″N 73°48′09″W
Result	British victory

Belligerents
United States	Great Britain

Commanders and leaders
Joseph Thompson (POW)	Chapple Norton

Strength
250 (150 engaged)	550

Casualties and losses
Total: 127; 14 killed; 37 wounded; 76 captured	5 killed 18 wounded

The Battle of Young's House (also known as the Battle of Young's Corners, Affair at Youngs House, and Action at Youngs Corners) was a skirmish fought outside New York City between British and American forces on February 3, 1780, during the American Revolutionary War. A British force attacked and destroyed a Continental Army outpost in Westchester County, New York.

== Background ==
Following the British Army's successful occupation of New York City in 1776, the second year of the American Revolutionary War, the areas north of the city that were between the American and British lines became a no-man's land known as the Neutral Ground. These areas, which included Westchester County, New York, and Greenwich, Connecticut, were frequently the site of raiding actions between the combatants. At the end of 1779, this no man's land included Tarrytown and White Plains. The American lines were not far north of this area, extending into Mount Pleasant. An outpost at a road intersection called the Four Corners (in the present-day hamlet of Valhalla, New York) occupied particularly advantageous ground, and its occupation was more than once disputed.

The outpost was on the property of Joseph Youngs, a local landowner and Patriot, who was a member of the New York Committee of Safety; his son, Samuel, was a Westchester militiaman and local guide for the Continental Army. Joseph was a pre-war tenant farmer of Frederick Philipse III, the last lord of Philipsburg Manor.

Youngs' house and barns at Four Corners were occupied by Continental Army troops beginning in August 1776. In December 1778, a British raid captured the small garrison posted there. They burned a barn but did not occupy the post, and it was promptly reoccupied by Continental Army troops in early 1779.

== Battle ==
Possibly in retaliation for a raid in January 1780 by the Americans against a British outpost at Kingsbridge, the British decided to make a raid on the outpost at Youngs House. On the night of February 2, 1780, Lieutenant Colonel Chapple Norton and a mixed force left the heights near Fort Knyphausen (as the British called Fort Washington). The force consisted of four flank companies from the 1st and 2nd Brigade of Guards, 100 Hessians from two regiments stationed at Kingsbridge, a company of 40 mounted Loyalist led by James DeLancey, and parties of mounted and unmounted Hessian jägers, numbering in total between five and six hundred men. They brought with them two small field pieces, and set out in sleighs owing to deep snow. However, both the sleighs and the field pieces were left behind when it was found that the men moved more quickly on foot. Because of the difficult conditions (including snow as much as 2 feet (61 cm) deep) the expedition did not reach the American lines until 9 am on February 3, 1780.

The outpost at Youngs house was the central point for a garrison that guarded a portion of the American line extending about 2 miles (3.2 km) westward toward the Hudson River and a slightly longer distance to the east. The 250-man garrison consisted of five companies drawn from the Massachusetts 1st, 3rd, 9th, 14th, and 15th Regiments, and were under the overall command of Lieutenant Colonel Joseph Thompson. Captains Stoddard and Roberts of the 15th and 1st were stationed to the west, Captain-Lieutenant Farley of the 9th and Captain Cooper of the 14th were stationed to the east, and Captain Watson of the 3rd was with Thompson at the house. Shortly before the British arrived, a local man warned Thompson that a large number of British were on the way. Thompson apparently discounted the reported size of the force, since he only sent out messengers to recall the four companies out on guard duty.

The first encounter between the two sides was between the vanguard of the British force and a picket guard consisting of a sergeant and his squad. The picket engaged the British, but was quickly overwhelmed by the horsemen and captured. The British cavalry then rode on toward the house, where Captain Roberts and his company had already arrived and taken up a position on the house's right. After exchange fire at long range, the cavalry halted to wait for the infantry, which arrived at about the same time as Captain-Lieutenant Farley's company; the companies of Stoddard and Cooper did not arrive in time to participate. A hot fire then began between the three American companies and the British force which lasted about 15 minutes. The numerically superior British force flanked the Americans and successfully occupied the orchard that was behind the house. Roberts was mortally wounded, and the American line broke, with some soldiers fleeing into the house, while others tried to escape into the countryside. American troops in the house held out a little longer, but the British set fire to it along with its attached buildings, which forced the occupants to surrender, while cavalry troops chased down stragglers outside.

== Aftermath ==
76 American soldiers were captured by the British included Lieutenant Colonel Thompson, Captain Watson, and Captain-Lieutenant Farley, while 17 wounded Americans were left behind. The prisoners were taken to Kingsbridge. Sources disagree whether Joseph Youngs was present during the battle. Some historians claim that he was taken prisoner in the December 1778 raid, while others suggest he was not captured until this action. After the raid, Wilhelm von Knyphausen wrote to Norton to congratulate him:

His Excellency Lt. Genl. Knyphausen desires his thanks may be given in public orders, to Lt. Colo. Norton of the Brigade of Guards for his good Conduct & Gallant behavior in Attacking & forcing a Considerably body of the Rebels Advantagiously posted at Young’s House in the Neighbourhood of White Plains, on the Morning of the 3rd Inst. His Excellency returns his thanks to the officers & private Soldiers of the different detachments employed on this Service, & the Genl. is particularly obliged to the Officers & men of the West Chester Refugees, for their very determined behavior upon this as well as former occasions.

Youngs bought his tenant farm after the Revolution, and it was later sold to Isaac Van Wart, one of the Westchester militiamen who captured the British intelligence officer, Major John André, on September 23, 1780, in nearby Tarrytown. André was later convicted and executed as a spy. Four Corners is mentioned in James Fenimore Cooper's 1821 novel, “The Spy: A Tale of the Neutral Ground,” as the setting for Elizabeth Flanagan’s Tavern, where the spy, Harvey Birch, is held by Continental militia.

The original house no longer stands; the site eventually became part of the Westchester Community College campus. A stone memorial for the soldiers killed in the battle is located near the battle site in Valhalla, where the skeletal remains of several American and British combatants, uncovered in 1921, were reburied. The inscription reads:

"Here rest the remains of Soldiers of the Continental Army who fell February 3, 1780 in the gallant defence of Young’s Corners. Buried with several of their opponents in this vicinity. They are interred on the field of conflict beneath this memorial."

== Bibliography ==
- Dawson, Henry (1858). Battles of the United States. p. 579.
- Kwasny, Mark (30 July 1998). Washington's Partisan War. Kent State University Press. ISBN 9780873386111.
- MacKinnon, Daniel (1833). Origin and Services of the Coldstream Guards. London: R. Bentley. pp. 7. OCLC 6077010.
- Ward, Christopher (1952). The War of the Revolution. New York: The MacMillan Company. OCLC 425995.
- Bolton, Robert. A history of the county of Westchester, vol 1 (local geography, property description)
- Comstock, Sarah (1914-07-19). On Old Saw Mill River Road, New York Times (describes where property is in more modern terms—on road between Sleepy Hollow and North White Plains)
- Schwab, John Christopher. The revolutionary history of Fort Number Eight on Morris Heights, New York City
