= George Holme Sumner =

Politician

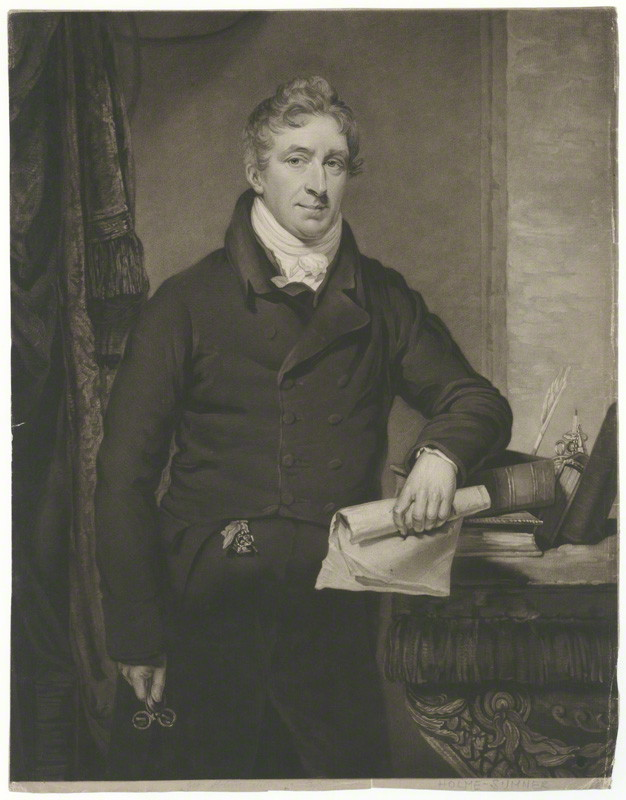
George Holme Sumner

George Holme Sumner (10 November 1760 – 26 June 1838) was at various stages throughout the 18th and 19th century one of the two Members of Parliament for Ilchester, Guildford, and Surrey.

Born in Calcutta, he was the son of William Brightwell Sumner, a nabob, who returned from India and in 1770 bought Hatchlands. He was educated at Harrow School and Emmanuel College, Cambridge. He served as an officer of the Surrey Militia.

Parliament of Great Britain
Preceded by George Johnstone; Benjamin Bond-Hopkins	Member of Parliament for Ilchester; 1787–1790; With: Benjamin Bond-Hopkins	Succeeded by John Harcourt; Samuel Long
Preceded by Viscount Cranley; Chapple Norton	Member of Parliament for Guildford; 1790–1796; With: Viscount Cranley	Succeeded by Viscount Cranley; Chapple Norton
Parliament of the United Kingdom
Preceded by Thomas Cranley Onslow; Chapple Norton	Member of Parliament for Surrey; 1806–1807; With: Thomas Cranley Onslow	Succeeded by Thomas Cranley Onslow; Chapple Norton
Preceded by Lord William Russell; Sir John Frederick, 5th Baronet	Member of Parliament for Surrey; 1807–1812; With: Samuel Thornton	Succeeded by George Holme Sumner; Sir Thomas Sutton, 1st Baronet
Preceded by George Holme Sumner; Samuel Thornton	Member of Parliament for Surrey; 1812–1813; With: Sir Thomas Sutton, 1st Baronet	Succeeded by George Holme Sumner; Samuel Thornton
Preceded by George Holme Sumner; Samuel Thornton	Member of Parliament for Surrey; 1813–1818; With: Samuel Thornton	Succeeded by George Holme Sumner; William Joseph Denison
Preceded by George Holme Sumner; Samuel Thornton	Member of Parliament for Surrey; 1818–1826; With: William Joseph Denison	Succeeded by Charles Nicholas Pallmer; William Joseph Denison
Preceded by George Chapple Norton; Arthur Onslow	Member of Parliament for Surrey; 1830–1831; With: Charles Baring Wall	Succeeded by Charles Francis Norton; James Mangles
