= Sir Edward Frederick, 9th Baronet =

English cricketer and British Army officer (1880–1956)

Edward Frederick
Personal information
- Full name: Edward Boscawen Frederick
- Born: 29 June 1880; Loppington Hall, Shropshire, England
- Died: 26 October 1956 (aged 76); St John's Wood, London, England
- Batting: Right-handed
- Bowling: Right-arm slow
- Relatives: John Frederick (uncle)

Domestic team information
- Years: Team
- 1903–1904: Hampshire
- 1907: Europeans

Career statistics
Competition	First-class
Matches	6
Runs scored	36
Batting average	5.14
100s/50s	–/–
Top score	11
Balls bowled	618
Wickets	10
Bowling average	36.20
5 wickets in innings	–
10 wickets in match	–
Best bowling	3/41
Catches/stumpings	12/–
- Source: Cricinfo, 23 August 2016

Sir Edward Boscawen Frederick, 9th Baronet CVO (29 June 1880 – 26 October 1956) was an English first-class cricketer, British Army officer, and a Royal courtier. The son of the 7th Baronet of the Frederick Baronets, he joined the army in February 1899 and would see action with the Royal Fusiliers in the Second Boer and First World War's. As a first-class cricketer, he played for both Hampshire County Cricket Club and the Europeans cricket team. Having been seriously wounded during the First World War, Frederick would later serve as a Yeoman of the Guard during the reigns of George V, Edward VIII, and George VI.

== Early life and military career ==
The second son of Sir Charles Frederick, and grandson of General Edward Frederick, he was born at Loppington Hall in Shropshire. He was educated at Eton College, before attending the Royal Military College, Sandhurst. He graduated from there into the Royal Fusiliers as a second lieutenant in February 1899. He fought with the 2nd Battalion, Royal Fusiliers in the Second Boer War and was present at the battles of Colenso (December 1899) and the Tugela Heights (February 1900), leading to the Relief of Ladysmith (1 March 1900), following which he was promoted to lieutenant later in March 1900. Serving in the Transvaal in 1900, he stayed in South Africa throughout the war which ended with the Peace of Vereeniging in June 1902. Four months later he left Cape Town on the SS Salamis with other officers and men of the battalion, arriving at Southampton in late October, when the battalion was posted to Aldershot.

Being garrisoned in Aldershot allowed Frederick to play first-class cricket for Hampshire, making his debut in the 1903 County Championship against Leicestershire at Leicester. He played first-class cricket for Hampshire until 1904, making five appearances. In these matches, he took 9 wickets with his right-arm slow bowling, at an average of 36.77 and best figures of 3 for 41. In the army, he was promoted to captain in October 1904. He was appointed an adjutant in June 1907, and subsequently served in British India. While there, he made a single first-class appearance for the Europeans cricket team against the Parsees at Bombay in the 1907–08 Bombay Tournament.

== First World War and later career ==
He returned to Sandhurst as an instructor from 1912 to 1914, but returned to active duty at the beginning of the First World War, being appointed a temporary major in the fourth month of the war; he gained the rank in full in September 1915, prior to his appointment to the staff the following month. He was severely wounded later in the war, and was placed on the retired list after the war, in May 1919. In 1925, he was appointed an exon in the King's Bodyguard of the Yeomen of the Guard, replacing the deceased Colonel Bulmer de Sales La Terriere; prior to his appointment, he had been promoted to lieutenant colonel in the Royal Fusiliers in February 1924. Frederick was appointed an ensign of the guard in August 1937, a rank he maintained until his retirement in 1950.

He became the 9th Baronet of the Frederick baronets in October 1938, upon the death of his elder brother, Sir Charles Frederick. During the Second World War, he commanded a battalion of the Home Guard. Frederick was appointed a Commander of the Royal Victorian Order in the 1944 New Year Honours. Frederick died at St John's Wood in October 1956, and was succeeded as the 10th Baronet by his son, Sir Charles Frederick. He was one of three children (two sons and a daughter) he had with Edith Katherine Cortlandt, whom he had married in 1913. Their youngest son, John, was killed in action in 1943 during the Second World War. His uncle, John Frederick, was also a first-class cricketer.

Baronetage of Great Britain
Preceded by Sir Charles Frederick, 8th Baronet	Baronet (of Burwood House); 1938–1956	Succeeded by Sir Charles Frederick, 10th Baronet
