= Samuel Thornton (MP) =

English banker and politician (1754–1838)

- Born: 6 November 1754; Clapham
- Died: 3 July 1838 (aged 83); Brighton
- Occupations: Politician, abolitionist and Governor of the Bank of England
- Children: Sophia Thornton who married John Leslie-Melville, 9th Earl of Leven
- Parent(s): John Thornton (father); Lucy Watson (mother)
- Relatives: Robert Thornton (brother); Henry Thornton (brother)

Samuel Thornton (6 November 1754 – 3 July 1838) was one of the sons of John Thornton, a leading merchant in the Russian and Baltic trade, and was a director of the Bank of England for 53 years and Governor (1799–1801). He had earlier served as its Deputy Governor. He was Member of Parliament (MP) for Kingston upon Hull (with William Wilberforce in 1784) from 1784 to 1806 and for Surrey from 1807 to 1812. He was a member of the Committee for the repeal of the Test and Corporation Acts.

As MP for Kingston he was painted by Karl Anton Hickel in the group portrait "William Pitt addressing the House of Commons on the French Declaration of War, 1793" which still hangs at the National Portrait Gallery.

He bought Albury Park, Albury, Surrey in 1800, and lived there until 1811. He employed the architect Sir John Soane to improve the property.

During the early 19th century Thornton built housing in the hamlet of Weston Street, a mile to the west of Albury, for the resettlement of villagers removed from cottages in Albury Park, as part of the agricultural improvements.

His brothers Henry Thornton and Robert Thornton were also notable men of their time and MPs. all three were members of the Clapham Sect and lived in adjoining houses in Clapham.

Parliament of Great Britain
Preceded by David Hartley; William Wilberforce	Member of Parliament for Kingston upon Hull; 1784–1800; With: William Wilberforce to 1784; Walter Spencer Stanhope 1784–1790; Earl of Burford 1790–1796; Sir Charles Turner from 1796	Succeeded by Parliament of the United Kingdom
Parliament of the United Kingdom
Preceded by Parliament of Great Britain	Member of Parliament for Kingston upon Hull; 1801–1806; With: Sir Charles Turner to 1802; John Staniforth from 1802	Succeeded by William Joseph Denison; John Staniforth
Preceded by Lord William Russell; Sir John Frederick	Member of Parliament for Surrey; 1807–1812; With: George Holme Sumner	Succeeded by Sir Thomas Sutton; George Holme Sumner
Preceded by Sir Thomas Sutton; George Holme Sumner	Member of Parliament for Surrey; 1807–1812; With: George Holme Sumner	Succeeded by Sir Thomas Sutton; William Joseph Denison
Government offices
Preceded by Thomas Raikes	Governor of the Bank of England; 1799–1801	Succeeded by Job Mathew Raikes
