= Loppington =

Village in Shropshire, England

Coordinates: 52.858°N 2.786°W

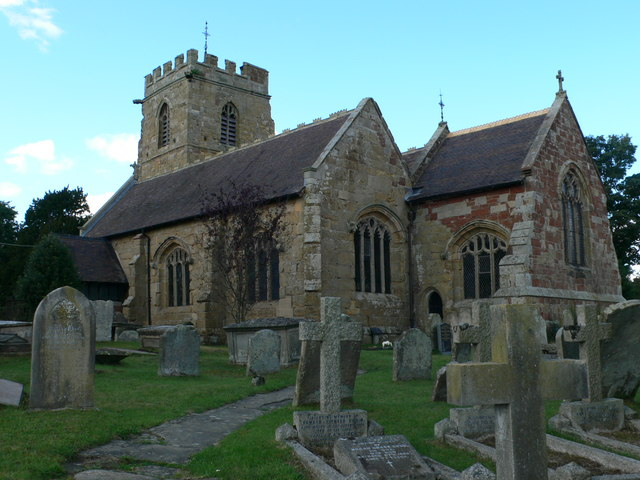
- St Michael and All Angels church, Loppington

- Location within Shropshire
- Population: 611 (2011)
- OS grid reference: SJ470293
- Civil parish: Loppington
- Unitary authority: Shropshire
- Ceremonial county: Shropshire
- Region: West Midlands
- Country: England
- Sovereign state: United Kingdom
- Post town: Shrewsbury
- Postcode district: SY4
- Dialling code: 01939
- Police: West Mercia
- Fire: Shropshire
- Ambulance: West Midlands
- UK Parliament: North Shropshire

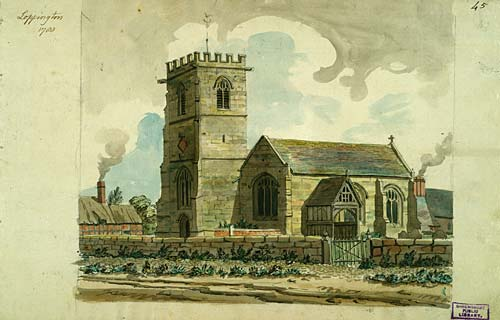
Saint Michael's Church, Loppington, painted by the Rev. Williams in 1788.

Loppington is a village and parish in Shropshire, England, situated a few miles west of Wem. The population of the parish (2001) is 576 and there are 206 households. The population as of the 2011 census was 611.

Loppington was recorded in the Domesday Book (1086) as Lopitone.

It has a rich history and many historical buildings, including the Church of Saint Michael, dating back to the 14th century and having traces of a Norman building with characteristic Norman architecture.

Other interesting buildings are The Nook a timber-framed house near to the church, and Loppington Hall, an early 18th-century brick house, a former residence of John Lloyd Dickin restored in 2002.

The village has the only remaining bull ring in North Shropshire, which was reported to be used for bull baiting until the 19th century.

== Notable people ==
- Sir Edward Frederick, 9th Baronet, cricketer and British Army officer, born at Loppington Hall
- Chris Hawkins - radio presenter, producer, and celebrity
- Edward Lhuyd (Lloyd) - 17th century scientist, botanist, geologist, philologist and friend of Sir Isaac Newton

== See also ==
- Listed buildings in Loppington
