= Frederick baronets =

Title in the Baronetage of Great Britain

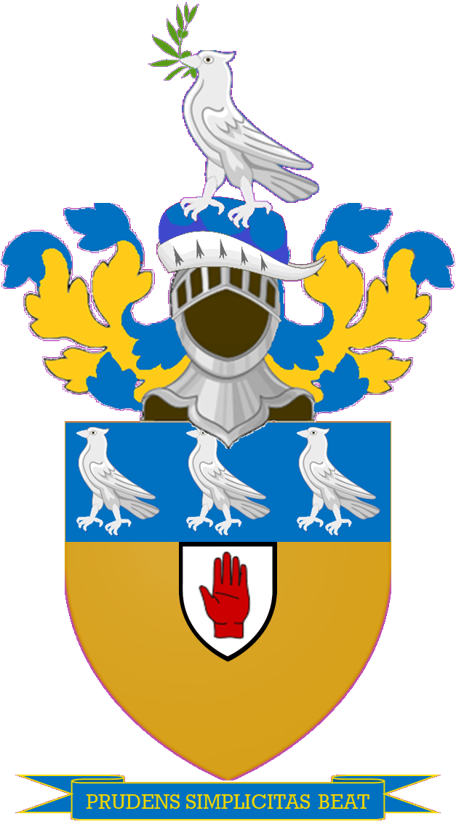
- Escutcheon: Or on a chief Azure three doves Argent. Crest: On a chapeau Azure turned up Ermine a dove as in the arms
- Creation date: 10 June 1723
- First holder: John Frederick
- Present holder: Christopher Frederick
- Status: Extant
- Former seats: Burwood House, Surrey
- Motto: Prudens Simplicitas Beat (Prudent Simplicity Blesses)

The Frederick baronetcy, of Burwood House in the County of Surrey, is a title in the Baronetage of Great Britain. It was created on 10 June 1723 for John Frederick, grandson of the wealthy London merchant Sir John Frederick. of

The 4th Baronet represented Shoreham from 1740 to 1741, and West Looe from 1743 to 1761, in the House of Commons; while the 5th Baronet represented Newport (Cornwall), Christchurch and Surrey. The 7th Baronet was High Sheriff of Hampshire in 1889, and the 8th was High Sheriff of Northamptonshire in 1934.

== Frederick baronets, of Burwood House (1723) ==
- Sir John Frederick, 1st Baronet (1678–1755)
- Sir John Frederick, 2nd Baronet (1728–1757)
- Sir Thomas Frederick, 3rd Baronet (1731–1770)
- Sir John Frederick, 4th Baronet, MP, (1708–1783)
- Sir John Frederick, 5th Baronet, MP, (1750–1825)
- Sir Richard Frederick, 6th Baronet (1780–1873)
- Sir Charles Edward Frederick, 7th Baronet (1843–1913)
- Sir Charles Edward St John Frederick, 8th Baronet (1876–1938)
- Sir Edward Boscawen Frederick, 9th Baronet (1880–1956)
- Sir Charles Boscawen Frederick, 10th Baronet (1919–2001)
- Sir Christopher St John Frederick, 11th Baronet (born 1950)

The heir apparent is the present holder's son Benjamin St. John Frederick (born 1991).

== Extended family ==
- The 1st Baronet was the grandson of Sir John Frederick, Lord Mayor of London in 1662 and Member of Parliament for Dartmouth and the City of London. The latter was president of Christ's Hospital rebuilding its hall after the Fire of London by expending £5,000 and founding its mathematical school He died in 1685 leaving £42,000.
- Sir Thomas Frederick (1680–1730), son of the 3rd Baronet, Governor of Fort St. David, East Indies
- Sir Charles Frederick (1709–1785), son of the 6th baronet, MP, Surveyor of the Ordnance
- Col. Charles Frederick, East India Company, (1748–1791)
- Gen. Edward Frederick (1784–1866)
- Marescoe Frederick, younger brother of the 4th Baronet, was a major-general in the British Army. His great-great-grandson, John Cromwell Frederick (1920–1974), was a captain in the Royal Navy. Another descendant was the courtier Charles Arthur Frederick.

Burwood House was in the southern half of Walton-on-Thames, which later became Hersham.The family seat fell into the female line and was rebuilt circa 1810 to become Burwood Park School on Manor Park Drive as it replaced a manor house. Its outlying 1.5-square-kilometre (370-acre)-estate between Walton on Thames railway station (Sir Richard's Bridge) and St George's Hill, Burwood Park, was sold by the sixth baronet's purchaser's daughters in the late 19th century to Edward Guinness, 1st Earl of Iveagh who converted it into the Burwood Park gated residential estate.

== Notes ==
Baronetage of Great Britain
| Preceded by Codrington baronets | Frederick baronets of Burwood House; 10 June 1723 | Succeeded by Vandeput baronets |
