= Portrait of Charles Frederick =

Painting by Andrea Casali

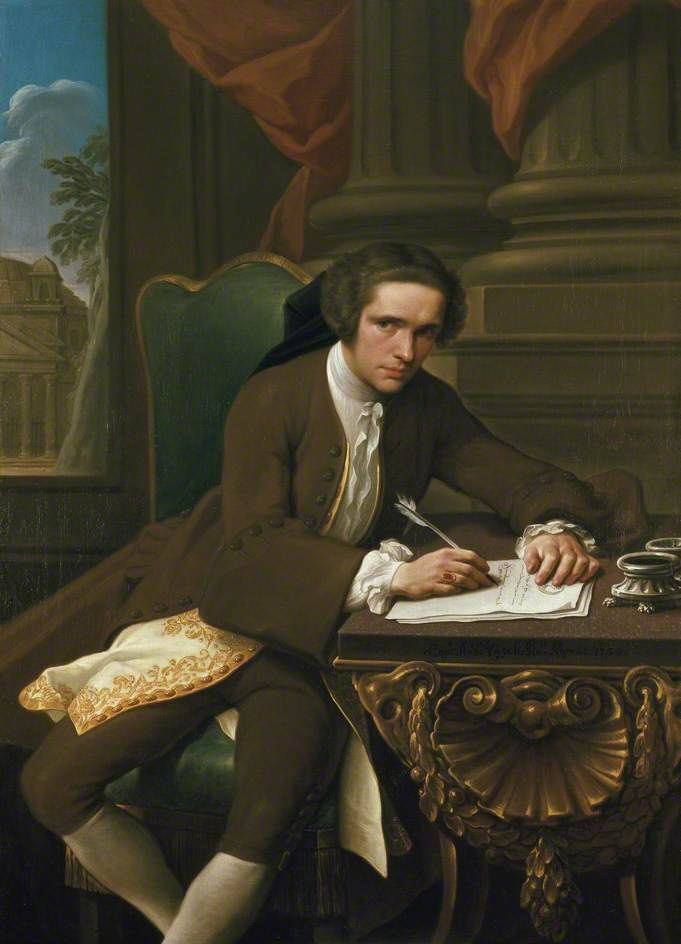
- Artist: Andrea Casali
- Year: 1738
- Type: Oil on canvas, portrait painting
- Dimensions: 133.5 cm × 96.5 cm (52.6 in × 38.0 in)
- Location: Ashmolean Museum; Oxford

Portrait of Charles Frederick is a 1738 portrait painting by the Italian artist Andrea Casali. It depicts the British politician Charles Frederick. Painted in Rome, it is a significant early example of the Grand Tour portrait style that became an established tradition for British visitors in Italy during the eighteenth century. He is shown seated at a table in a curtained loggia with the Pantheon in the background, and has the composition of what would become the standard Neoclassical portrait. He is shown seated at a table Stylistically it provides a bridge between Francesco Trevisani and Pompeo Batoni.

Frederick was a noted antiquarian, who travelled to Italy with his brother in 1737–38. He became a significant patron to Casali when he relocated to England in 1741. Today the painting is in the collection of the Ashmolean Museum in Oxford, having been acquired in 1980.

== Bibliography ==
- Black, Jeremy. Italy and the Grand Tour. Yale University Press, 2003.
- Redford, Bruce. Venice and the Grand Tour. Yale University Press, 1996.
