= John Frederick (London MP) =

English merchant, MP and Lord Mayor of London

Sir John Frederick (25 October 1601 – March 1685) was an English merchant, MP and Lord Mayor of London.

Frederick was a city of London merchant and a member of the Worshipful Company of Barber-Surgeons. On 22 September 1653, he was elected an alderman of the City of London for Vintry ward. In 1654, he was Master of the Barber-Surgeons company and elected Sheriff of London for 1655 to 1656. From 1657 to 1658 he was a member of the Committee of the East India Company. In 1658 he was Master of the Barber-Surgeons company again.

In 1660, Frederick was elected Member of Parliament for Dartmouth in the Convention Parliament. He was knighted on 26 June 1660. He was a member of the Committee of the East India Company from 1660 to 1661. In 1661, he was elected alderman for Coleman Street, remaining as an alderman until his death. He translated to the Worshipful Company of Grocers on 3 October 1661 and was elected the same year as 326th Lord Mayor of London.

Frederick became president of Christ's Hospital in 1662 and held the post until his death. In 1663 he was elected MP for City of London in the Cavalier Parliament and sat until 1679. He was Master of the Grocers Company from 1677 to 1678.

Frederick was the grandfather of Sir John Frederick, 1st Bt, and Jane Murray, Duchess of Atholl.

Frederick died at the age of 83 and was buried on 19 March 1685.
