= Thomas Cranley Onslow =

British politician (1778–1861)

Thomas Cranley Onslow (7 October 1778 – 7 July 1861), of Stoke Park, Guildford, and Upton House, Hampshire, was a British politician and British Army officer, the second son of Thomas Onslow, 2nd Earl of Onslow.

He married Susannah Elizabeth Hillier (died 1852), coheiress of Nathaniel Hiller of Stoke Park, on 28 May 1813, and they had several children:

- George Augustus Cranley Onslow (1813–1855)
- Arthur Edward Onslow (1815–1897)
- Charles? Townshend Onslow (1822–1823)
- Susannah Augusta Arabella Onslow (1816–1899)
- Elizabeth Harriet Onslow (1817–1824)
- Harriet Charlotte Matilda Onslow (1826–1885)

Onslow served in the Scots Fusilier Guards, rising to the rank of lieutenant colonel. He was posted to the Cádiz garrison as a captain in 1810. On 15 March 1812, he succeeded his father as Colonel of the 2nd Royal Surrey Militia, a position he held until his resignation on 14 August 1852.

== Notes ==
Parliament of the United Kingdom
Preceded by Viscount Cranley; Chapple Norton	Member of Parliament for Guildford; 1806–1818; With: George Holme Sumner 1806–1807; Chapple Norton 1807–1812; Arthur Onslow 1812–1818	Succeeded by Arthur Onslow; Sir William Best
