= Lozoya =

- Municipality
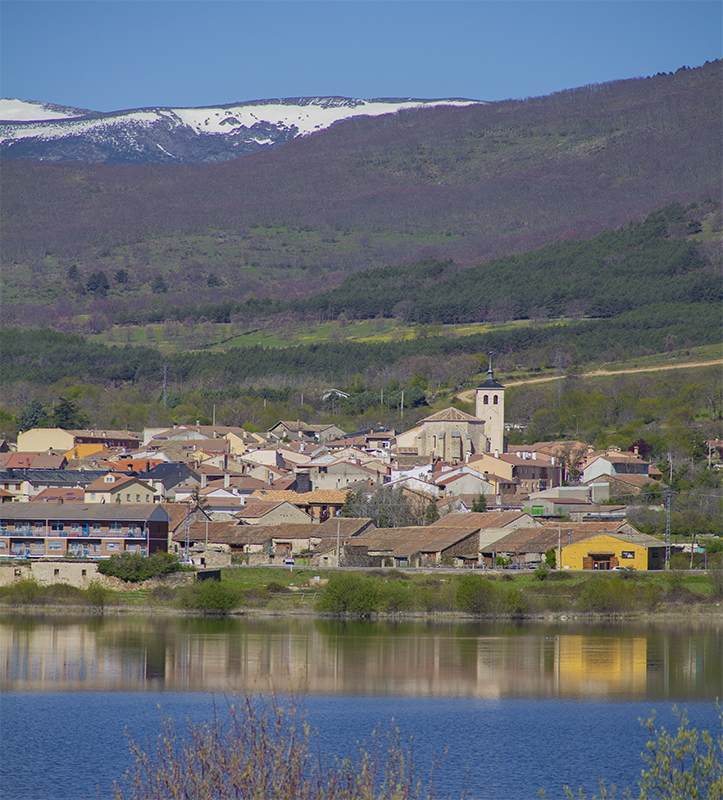

- Flag Coat of arms
- Interactive map of Lozoya
- Location in Spain Lozoya (Community of Madrid)
- Coordinates: 40.951073°N 3.791652°W
- Country: Spain
- Region: Community of Madrid

Area
  - Total: 57.94 km^{2} (22.37 sq mi)
- Elevation: 1,116 m (3,661 ft)

Population (2025-01-01)
  - Total: 598
  - Density: 10.3/km^{2} (26.7/sq mi)
- Time zone: UTC+1 (CET)
  - Summer (DST): UTC+2 (CEST)

Lozoya (Spanish: [loˈθoʝa]) is a municipality in the Community of Madrid, Spain. The municipality covers an area of 57.94 km^{2}. It is located at 1,116 metres above sea level.
