= Frederick Charles (designer) =

British industrial designer

Frederick Charles Ashford (22 April 1909 – November 2004) was a British industrial designer, known also as Frederick Charles.

== Works ==
- Designing For Industry : Some Aspects of the Product Designer's Work, 1955
- The Aesthetics of Engineering Design, 1969
