= Thomas Onslow, 2nd Earl of Onslow =

English nobleman and courtier

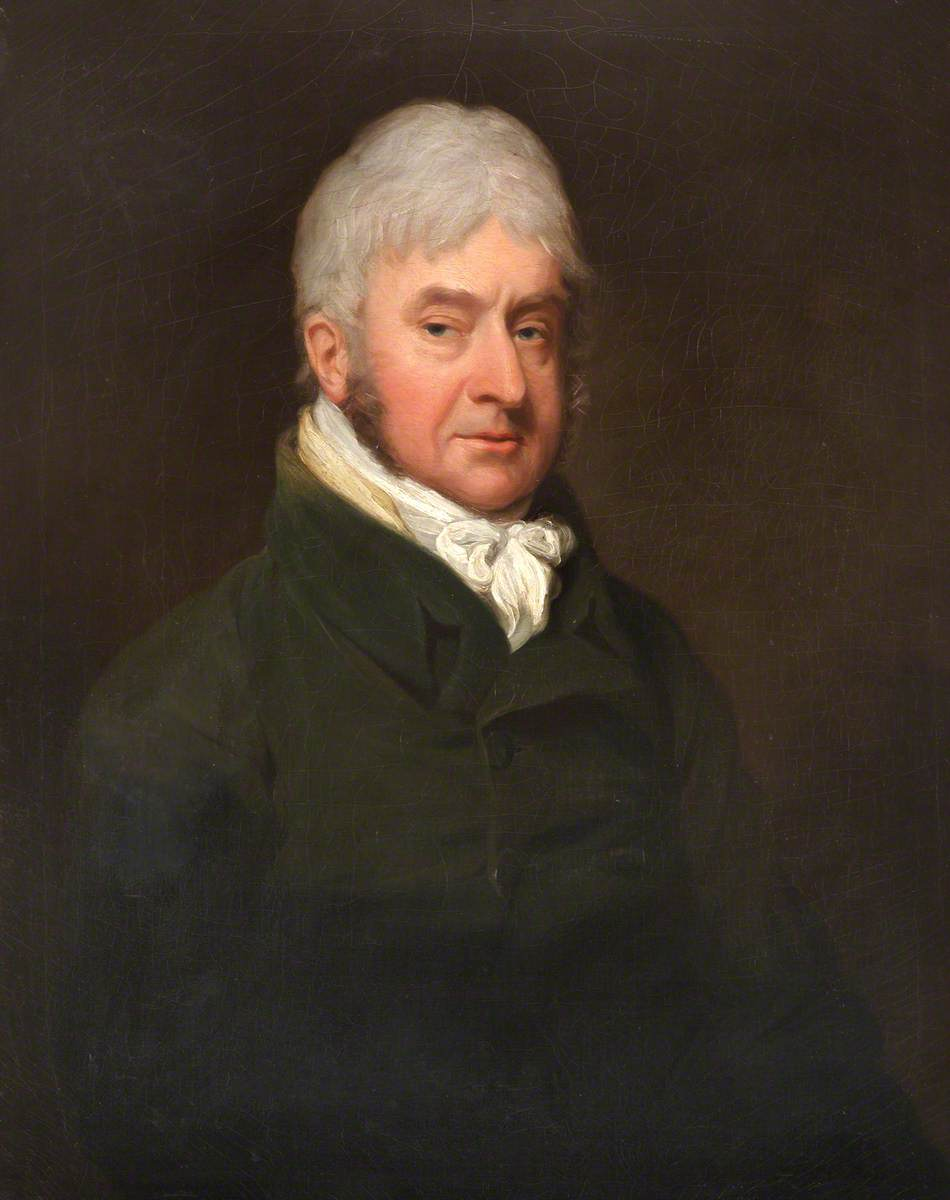
1813 portrait of the 2nd Earl of Onslow

Thomas Onslow, 2nd Earl of Onslow (15 March 1754 – 22 February 1827) was an English nobleman and courtier who succeeded to his title in 1814. Originally the Honourable Tom Onslow, he was styled Viscount Cranley from 1801 to 1814. He died in 1827 at his seat, Clandon Park in Surrey.

== Family ==
Onslow was born at Imber Court, Thames Ditton, Surrey, the eldest son of the then George Onslow, later the 1st Earl. and Henrietta Shelley, daughter of Sir John Shelley, 4th Baronet and his second wife Margaret Pelham.

On 30 December 1776, he married Arabella Mainwaring-Ellerker (d. 11 April 1782), by whom he had four children:

- Arthur George Onslow, 3rd Earl of Onslow (1777–1870)
- Thomas Cranley Onslow (1778–1861)
- Capt. & Lt-Col. Mainwaring Edward Onslow, Scots Fusilier Guards (2 October 1779 – 1861)
- Lady Elizabeth Harriet Onslow (d. 18 July 1824)

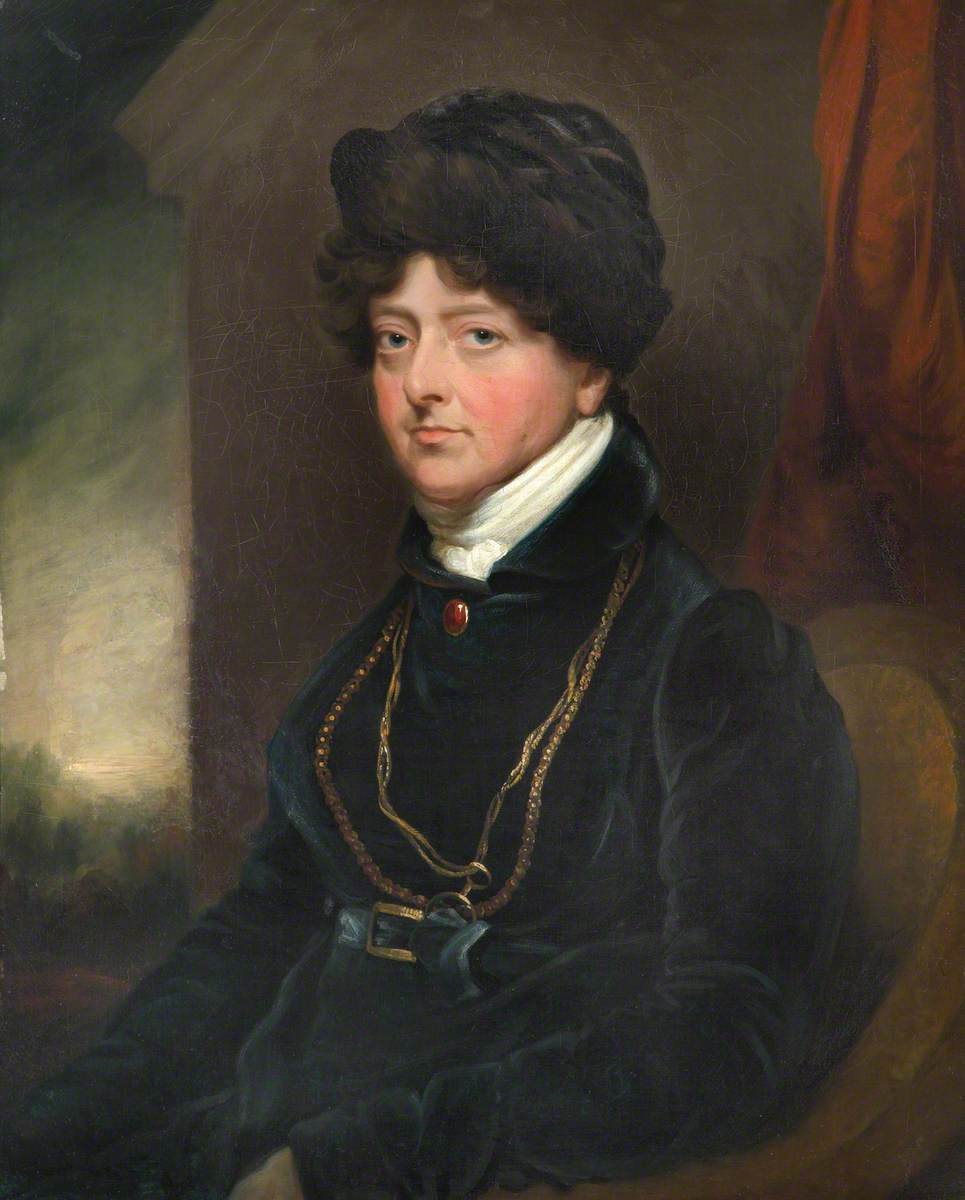
1813 portrait of the Countess of Onslow

He subsequently married, on 13 February 1783, Charlotte Duncombe (d. 25 April 1819), née Hale, widow of Thomas Duncombe (d. 1779). They had one daughter:

- Lady Georgiana Charlotte Onslow (d. 15 May 1829)

== Career ==
=== Parliament ===
Onslow entered the British House of Commons for Rye in 1775. In 1784, he left Rye and replaced his father's first cousin, Colonel Onslow, as MP for Guildford upon the retirement of the latter. He continued to represent that constituency until 1806, when he was replaced by his second son, Thomas Cranley.

A supporter of the Foxite Whigs, Onslow was, however, rarely active in the House of Commons, presenting a petition in 1781 on behalf of a "body of the innholders of England", complaining of the quartering of soldiers upon them. As an associate of the Prince Regent, he was sent to Mrs Fitzherbert to tell her that the Prince had attempted suicide and only she could save his life, and he guarded the door of Fitzherbert's house when she secretly married the prince. However, he later fell out with the Prince, for reasons unknown, voting in favour of Pitt's regency proposal of 1789 and against the abolition of the slave trade in 1796.

=== Militia ===
He was appointed Colonel of the 1st Surrey Supplementary Militia (later 2nd Royal Surrey Militia) on 2 January 1797 on the recommendation of his father, who was Lord Lieutenant of Surrey. His son Arthur George Onslow was a lieutenant in the regiment. He resigned from the command in 1812 and handed it over to his second son, Thomas Cranley.

== Sport ==
=== Cricket ===
Onslow was an amateur cricketer mainly associated with Surrey and he made 3 known appearances from 1801 to 1808.

=== Carriage driving ===
Onslow was an intimate of the Prince of Wales, and was known for his mania for driving four-in-hand. His phaeton, painted black and drawn by "four of the finest black horses in England", was thought by Gronow to have the appearance of an undertaker's carriage. He was the subject of numerous satirical verses on the subject, such as "What cam Tommy Onslow do/ he can drive a coach and two?/Can Tommy Onslow do more/Yes drive a coach and four".

== External sources ==
- Thomas Onslow at CricketArchive (subscription required) (archive)
- Hansard 1803–2005: contributions in Parliament by the Earl of Onslow
- Queen's Royal Surrey

Parliament of Great Britain
Preceded by Rose Fuller; Middleton Onslow	Member of Parliament for Rye; 1775–1784; With: Rose Fuller 1775–1777; William Dickinson 1777–1784	Succeeded by William Dickinson; Charles Wolfran Cornwall
Preceded by George Onslow; William Norton	Member of Parliament for Guildford; 1784–1801; With: Chapple Norton 1784–1790; George Holme Sumner 1790–1796; Chapple Norton 1796–1801	Succeeded by Parliament of the United Kingdom
Parliament of the United Kingdom
Preceded by Parliament of Great Britain	Member of Parliament for Guildford; 1801–1806; With: Chapple Norton	Succeeded by Thomas Cranley Onslow; George Holme Sumner
Political offices
Preceded by George Onslow	Out-Ranger of Windsor Forest; 1792–1827	Office abolished
Peerage of the United Kingdom
Preceded by George Onslow	Earl of Onslow; 1814–1827	Succeeded by Arthur Onslow
