= Sir John Frederick, 5th Baronet =

British politician (1750–1825)

Sir John Frederick, 5th Baronet (1750–1825), was a British politician who sat in the House of Commons between 1774 and 1807.

== Early life ==
Frederick was the only surviving son of Sir John Frederick, 4th Baronet of Burwood Park, Surrey, and his wife Susanna Hudson. He was born on 18 March 1750, educated at Westminster School from 1760 to 1765, and at Trinity College, Oxford in 1767. From 1769 to 1772 he made the Grand Tour of Europe.

== Career ==
In 1774, Frederick was returned as Member of Parliament for Newport, Cornwall in the interest of Humphry Morice. By 1780, Morice had sold his borough and Frederick was not returned in 1780. He sought another seat and was returned for Christchurch at a by-election in 1781. On the death of his father on 9 April 1783, he succeeded to the Baronetcy. He was re-elected for Christchurch in 1784. In 1790, he was elected MP for his home county Surrey and held the seat until 1807.

He served as lieutenant-colonel of the 1st Supplementary Surrey Militia (later 2nd Royal Surrey Militia from its first raising on 2 January 1797 until his resignation on 26 October 1804. His son Richard was also an officer in the regiment and commanded it in Ireland from 1811–13.

== Family ==
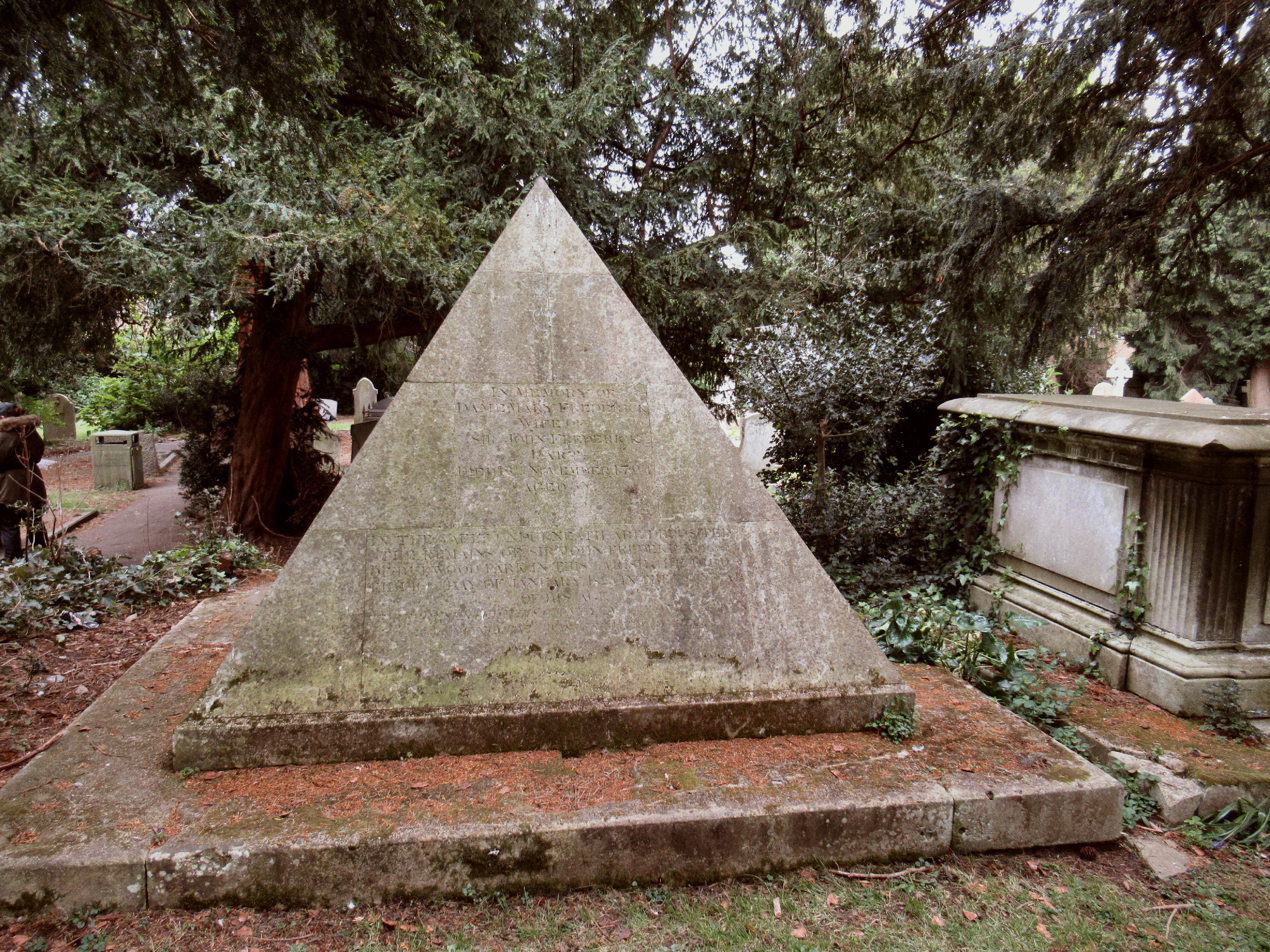
Walton-on-Thames, St Mary's Churchyard

He married Mary Garth, daughter of Richard Garth of Morden, Surrey, on 15 October 1778, and they had six sons and four daughters, including:

- Sir Richard Frederick, 6th Baronet, born on 30 December 1780, died on 20 September 1873
- Thomas Nathan Frederick, born on 11 July 1783, died in 1818
- Charlotte Frederick, married Rev R.A. St Leger of Starcross, Devon, and died in 1858
- Mary Frederick, married James Chamness Fisher of Twickenham and died on 2 April 1823
- Frances Frederick, married Henry Fellowes, 2nd son of Robert Fellowes of Shotesham, Norfolk, and died on 28 April 1874

Sir John Frederick died on 16 January 1825 and was buried at Walton-on-Thames where there is an unusual pyramid-shaped monument to him and his wife.

== Sources ==
- Burke's Peerage, Baronetage and Knightage, 100th Edn, London, 1953.
- Capt John Davis, Historical Records of the Second Royal Surrey or Eleventh Regiment of Militia, London: Marcus Ward, 1877.
- Kidd, Charles, Williamson, David (editors). Debrett's Peerage and Baronetage (1990 edition). New York: St Martin's Press, 1990.
- Leigh Rayment's list of baronets
- Walton on Thames St Mary’s Parish Church Monuments

Parliament of Great Britain
Preceded by Humphry Morice; Richard Bull	Member of Parliament for Newport; 1774–1780; With: Richard Bull 1774-1780	Succeeded by Viscount Maitland; John Coghill
Preceded by James Harris (junior); James Harris	Member of Parliament for Christchurch; 1781–1790; With: James Harris (junior) 1781-1788; Hans Sloane 1788-1790	Succeeded by Hans Sloane; George Rose
Preceded by Captain the Hon. William Finch; Lord William Russell	Member of Parliament for Surrey; 1790–1807; With: Lord William Russell	Succeeded by Samuel Thornton; George Holme Sumner
Baronetage of Great Britain
Preceded by John Frederick	Baronet (of Burwood House); 1783–1825	Succeeded by Richard Frederick
