= Sir John Frederick, 4th Baronet =

British politician

Sir John Frederick, 4th Baronet (28 November 1708 – 9 April 1783), was a British politician who sat in the House of Commons between 1740 and 1763.

Frederick was the son of Governor of Fort St. David in the East Indies Sir Thomas Frederick, 3rd Baronet of Burwood Park Surrey, and his wife Leonora née Maresco). He married Susannah Hudson, daughter of Sir Roger Hudson, on 22 October 1741: their only son John Frederick succeeded him. He was Member of Parliament for New Shoreham from 1740 to 1741; and for West Looe from 1743 to 1761.

Baronetage of Great Britain
Preceded by Thomas Frederick	Baronet (of Burwood House); 1770–1783	Succeeded by John Frederick
