= Edward Frederick (Indian Army officer) =

British Army general (1784–1866)

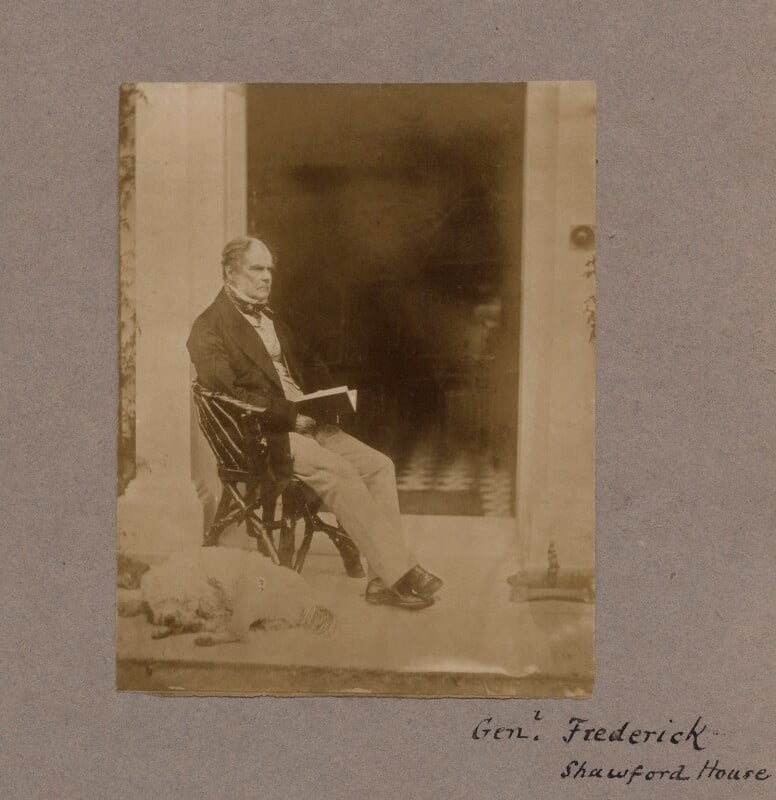
Frederick, 1850–1866

General Edward Frederick CB (23 June 1784 – 5 December 1866) was a British Indian Army officer who was Commissary General of the Bombay Army.

== Life ==
Frederick was the eldest son of Colonel Charles Frederick, nephew of Sir John Frederick, 4th Baronet MP. Edward's son Charles by his second wife, Mary, inherited the baronetcy as 7th baronet. His grandson, Sir Edward Frederick, 9th Baronet, was an Army officer and first-class cricketer.

Frederick followed his father into the British East India Company. He was appointed a Companion of the Order of the Bath (CB) in the 1838 Coronation Honours. He was promoted to General in 1860.

He died in Winchester, Hampshire, England in 1866.

== Family ==
Frederick married, firstly, Selina Grote, daughter of George Grote the elder and sister of George Grote. After her death, without issue, he married in 1841 Mary St John.
