= Onslow (surname) =

Onslow is a surname. Notable people with the surname include:

- Sir Alexander Onslow (1842–1908), third Chief Justice of the Supreme Court of Western Australia
- Arthur Onslow (disambiguation)
- Cranley Onslow (1926–2001), British politician
- Denzil Onslow (disambiguation)
- Edward Onslow (1758–1829), British nobleman, Member of Parliament and fellow of the Royal Society
- George Onslow (disambiguation)
- Guildford Onslow (1814–1882), English politician
- Hannah Onslow (born 1998), English actress
- Jack Onslow (1888–1960), American Major League Baseball player, manager, coach and scout
- Muriel Wheldale Onslow (1880–1932), British biochemist
- Richard Onslow (disambiguation)
- Thomas Onslow (disambiguation)
- William Onslow, 4th Earl of Onslow (1853–1911)
- William Onslow, 6th Earl of Onslow (1913–1971)
