= John Elwill =

John Elwill may refer to:

- Sir John Elwill, 1st Baronet (1643–1717), MP for Bere Alston
- Sir John Elwill, 2nd Baronet (died 1727), of the Elwill baronets
- Sir John Elwill, 4th Baronet (died 1778), MP for Guildford

== See also ==
- Elwill (surname)
