= Sir Francis Vincent, 8th Baronet =

English diplomat

Sir Francis Vincent, 8th Baronet (1747 – 17 August 1791) was an English diplomat.

== Early life ==
Vincent was born in 1747. He was the eldest son of Mary Howard and Sir Francis Vincent, 7th Baronet, who served as MP for Surrey from 1761 until his death in 1775.

His paternal grandparents were Sir Henry Vincent, 6th Baronet and the former Elizabeth Sherman. His maternal grandparents were Lt.-Gen. Hon. Thomas Howard, Governor of Berwick, and Mary Morton (a daughter of Rt. Rev. William Morton, Bishop of Meath).

== Career ==
Upon the death of his father in 1775, he succeeded as the 8th Baronet Vincent, of D'Abernon. Sir Francis served as British Resident Minister in Venice in 1790.

== Personal life ==
On 12 July 1779, Vincent married Mary Chiswell (1757–1826), the only child of Trench Chiswell, MP for Aldborough, and Mary (née Jurin) Chiswell. Her maternal grandfather was a daughter of Dr. James Jurin of Portland Place. Together, they were the parents of:

- Sir Francis Vincent, 9th Baronet (1780–1809), who married Jane Bouverie, daughter of Hon. Edward Bouverie (a son of the 1st Viscount Folkestone), in 1802.
- Anna Maria Vincent (c. 1784–1876), who married William Johnston Campbell, a son of Lt.-Gen. Colin Campbell and brother to Sir Guy Campbell, 1st Baronet.

Sir Francis died on 17 August 1791 and was succeeded by his only son, Francis.

=== Descendants ===
Through his daughter Anna, he was a grandfather of Mary Caroline Campbell (1820–1894), who married Andrés Avelino de Silva y Fernández de Córdoba, 13th Duke of Aliaga, in 1843.

Baronetage of England
Preceded by Francis Vincent	Baronet (of Stoke d'Abernon); 1775–1791	Succeeded by Francis Vincent
