= Joseph Mawbey =

British distiller and politician (1730–1798)

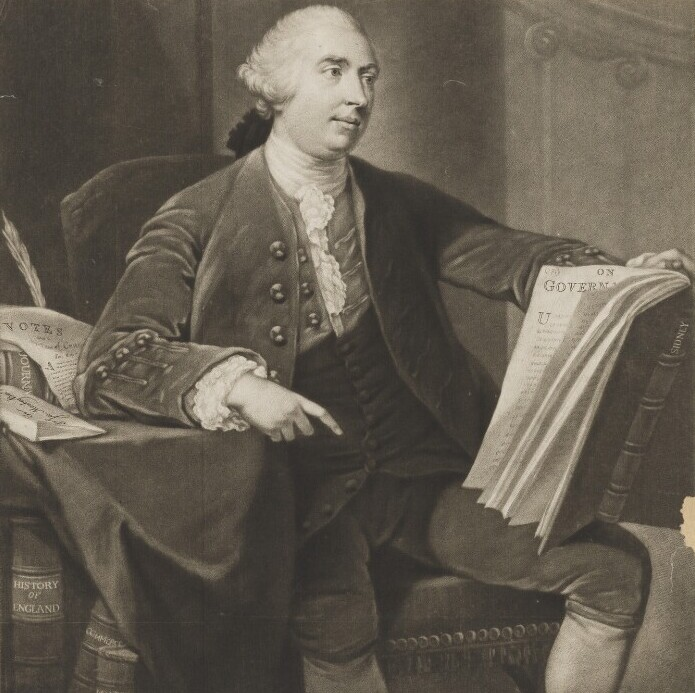
Engraving of Mawbey

Sir Joseph Mawbey, 1st Baronet (2 December 1730 – 16 June 1798) was a British distiller and politician who sat in the House of Commons of Great Britain between 1761 and 1790. He was a political supporter of John Wilkes.

== Early life ==
He was born near Ravenstone, in a house on the Derbyshire-Leicestershire border, on 2 December 1730, the fourth son and youngest child of John Mawbey (died 4 September 1754 aged 61), by his first wife, Martha, daughter of Thomas Pratt (died in September 1737). Both parents were buried at Ravenstone, where Joseph erected in 1764 a mural monument in the church. When about ten years old he was taken to Surrey by his uncle, Joseph Pratt, main owner of a distillery at Vauxhall. Mawbey was taken into the business at the age of 17, and carried it on for many years with his brother John.

== In politics ==
On his uncle's death in 1754, Mawbey inherited property in Surrey and established himself as a landed proprietor. He was High Sheriff of Surrey in 1757, bought the estate of Botleys in Chertsey in 1763, on which he built a large house, and for a quarter of a century was chairman of the Surrey quarter sessions. From 1761 to 1768 and from 1768 to 1774 he sat for Southwark, his colleague in the two-member constituency being Henry Thrale from 1765. He was created a baronet (30 July 1765) as a political ally by the Marquess of Rockingham.

On 14 November 1768 John Wilkes presented a petition through Mawbey. It covered points including the case brought over The North Briton, an allegation that Lord Mansfield had altered a record, and an allegation that Philip Carteret Webb had bribed Michael Curry, Wilkes's printer and a witness. Speeches by Mawbey on the proceedings against Wilkes were later published, in the Debates by Sir Henry Cavendish, 2nd Baronet. Mawbey was a significant force in the Bill of Rights Society that gave Wilkes practical support, and took Wilkes's side in the internal struggle, leading to a split in the Society, with supporters of John Horne.

In 1774 Mawbey contested the county of Surrey, but was defeated, though with 1,390 votes, by a cross-party agreement brokered by George Onslow who saw no chance of his own re-election; Sir Francis Vincent, 7th Baronet and James Scawen were returned. Vincent died in May 1775, causing a chance vacancy; and in June 1775 Mawbey was at the head of the poll. He was in the same position in 1780, when he offended some of his Whig supporters through his refusal to coalesce with Admiral Keppel; and in April 1784 he was returned without a contest.

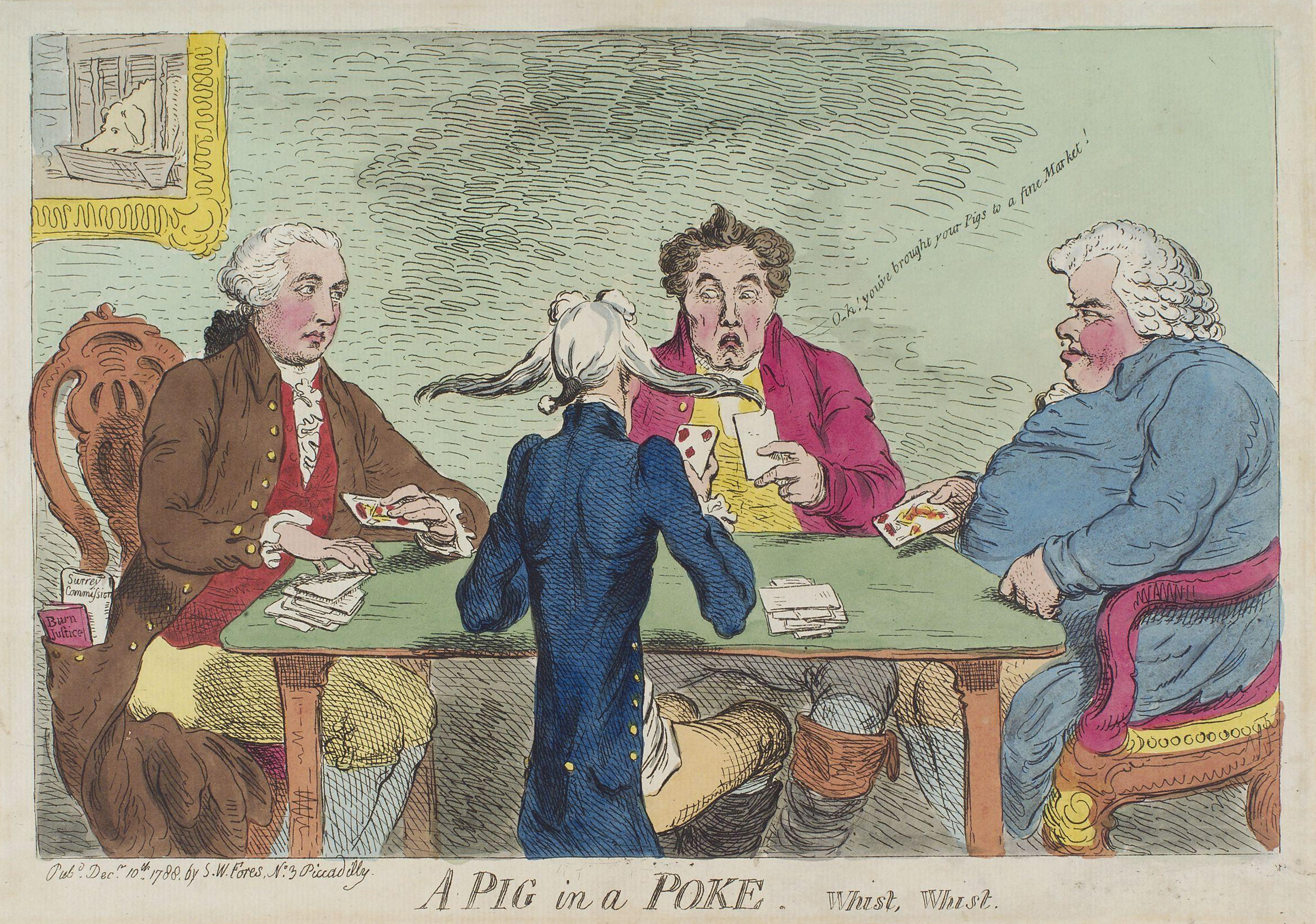
A pig in a poke, 1788 caricature by James Gillray, publisher Samuel William Fores, with Sir Joseph Mawbey on the left.

Mawbey was unpopular with the local gentry. He claimed to be above party, but was in the end a figure of fun and satire: he was introduced by James Gillray into his caricatures. He became a supporter of the Tory Pitt the Younger. In 1790, however, he was defeated by William Clement Finch who had Treasury backing.

== Death ==
Mawbey then ceased to sit in parliament. He died at Botleys, 16 June 1798, and was buried in the family vault in the chancel of Chertsey Church, where his wife and several of his children had preceded him. The tomb was designed by Thomas Denman.

== Works ==
Mawbey was author of The Battle of Epsom. A New Ballad (anonymous, 1763), on a meeting convened to return an address of thanks for the recent peace; it was the first production printed by Wilkes at his private press, and it was reprinted for sale at Guildford and in London in the same year. He is also credited with some Reflections on the French Revolution. One of the translations of Lord Belgrave's quotation in the "Political Miscellanies" at the end of the Rolliad is assigned to him.

In several instalments in the Gentleman's Magazine (1791 to 1797), Mawbey wrote a chatty biography of "Hesiod" Cooke. He took Cooke's side in criticism of David Mallet. Cooke had left Mawbey his manuscripts, and these articles comprise the fullest biographical account of him.

== Family ==
Mawbey married in August 1760 Elizabeth, only surviving daughter of his cousin, Richard Pratt of Vauxhall, and on her brother's death in 1766 she succeeded to property. She died at Botleys, 19 August 1790, having had nine children, four of whom were then alive. The second and last baronet was Sir Joseph Mawbey, who died 28 August 1817. The estate of Botleys was sold by his trustees in 1822. Several members of the family of Pratt were buried at Lambeth, and a monument was erected by Mawbey to their memory in 1779. Joseph was the administrator of his brother in-law William Alcock's estate when the latter died, leaving a young family who Joseph supported. Joseph procured a clerkship at the Treasury for one of William's sons who was also called Joseph. Joseph Alcock later became Chief Clerk of the Revenue. His son Thomas Alcock became a Liberal MP. Joseph procured a military commission for a second of William's sons also called Thomas Alcock (Ordnance) who, after a career in the Bengal Army, married Caroline St. Leger, daughter of St Leger St Leger, 1st Viscount Doneraile and was appointed treasurer of the ordnance in 1810.

== Notes ==
Parliament of Great Britain
Preceded by William Belchier; William Hammond	Member of Parliament for Southwark; 1761–1774; With: Alexander Hume 1761-1765; Henry Thrale 1765-1774	Succeeded by Nathaniel Polhill; Henry Thrale
Preceded by James Scawen; Sir Francis Vincent	Member of Parliament for Surrey; 1775–1790; With: James Scawen 1775-1780; Admiral the Hon. Augustus Keppel 1780-1782; Viscount Althorp 1782-1783; Sir Robert Clayton 1783-1784; Hon. William Norton 1784-1789; Lord William Russell 1789-1790	Succeeded by Lord William Russell; Captain the Hon. William Finch
Baronetage of Great Britain
New creation	Baronet (of Botleys); 1765–1798	Succeeded by Joseph Mawbey

Attribution

This article incorporates text from a publication now in the public domain: Lee, Sidney, ed. (1894). "Mawbey, Joseph". Dictionary of National Biography. Vol. 37. London: Smith, Elder & Co.
