= Francis Vincent =

Francis Vincent may refer to:

- Fay Vincent (Francis Thomas Vincent, born 1938), American former entertainment lawyer and sports executive, commissioner of Major League Baseball
- Sir Francis Vincent, 1st Baronet (c. 1568–1640), MP for Surrey 1626
- Sir Francis Vincent, 3rd Baronet (c. 1621–1670), MP for Dover
- Sir Francis Vincent, 5th Baronet (1646–1736), MP for Surrey 1690–1695 and 1710–1713
- Sir Francis Vincent, 7th Baronet (c. 1717–1775), MP for Surrey 1761–1775
- Sir Francis Vincent, 8th Baronet (1747–1791), English diplomat
- Sir Francis Vincent, 10th Baronet (1803–1880), English Whig politician, MP for St Albans 1831–1835

== See also ==
- Frank Vincent (disambiguation)
