= Elwill =

Elwill is a given name and surname. Notable people with the name include:

- Elwill Shanahan (1912–1983), American politician
- Elwill baronets
- John Elwill (disambiguation), multiple people
