= James Scawen =

British politician (1734–1801)

James Scawen (1734 – 7 January 1801) was a British politician who sat in the House of Commons from 1761 to 1780.

== Biography ==
Born 1734, Scawen was the son of Thomas Scawen MP and his wife Tryphena Russell, daughter of Lord James Russell of Maidwell, Northamptonshire. Scawen's family came from Cornwall, and had an interest at Mitchell. His grandfather Thomas Scawen and great-uncle William Scawen were wealthy merchants in London and acquired large estates in Surrey including Carshalton Park which his father inherited. He succeeded his father to these estates in 1774.

In 1761, Scawen was nominated by his father for Mitchell, and was returned as Member of Parliament for Mitchell unopposed in the 1761 general election. He was returned for Mitchell again at the 1768 general election but after a contest. His only reported speech in the House was on 25 March 1771 when he said he had only with difficulty escaped from the mob surrounding the House, which had pressed him to say which way he would vote. He added "That was not to be asked me without or within these walls. I came an independent man into this House".

Scawen attended the Surrey county meeting of October 1774, without intending to be a candidate; but was persuaded to stand for Surrey in the 1774 general election with the support of the leading interests in the county, in order to keep out Sir Joseph Mawbey. Scawen did not stand again for Surrey in 1780, and appears to have made no other attempt to re-enter Parliament.

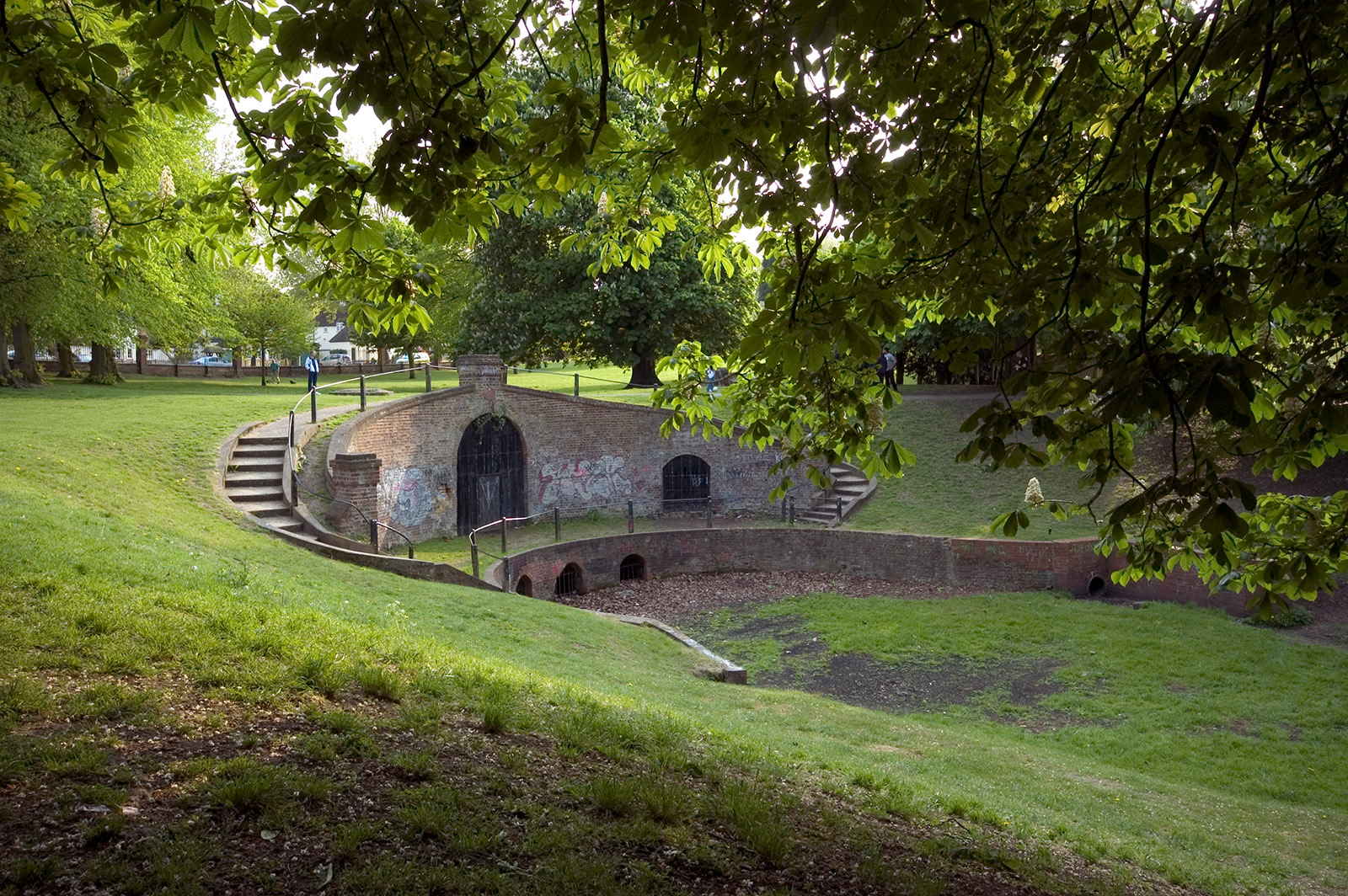
The Grotto at Carshalton Park

The Scawens developed Carshalton Park in the 18th century including an early grotto and canals that fed mills nearby. There were apparently financial difficulties and Scawen began to sell some of his Surrey property in 1774, shortly after succeeding his father, and during the next few years mortgaged or sold more of it, until in 1781 his remaining estates were disposed of by the trustees in whom they were finally vested. Scawen died on 7 January 1801.

== Sources ==
Parliament of Great Britain
Preceded by Simon Luttrell; Richard Hussey	Member of Parliament for Mitchell; 1761–1774; With: John Stephenson	Succeeded by John Stephenson; Hon. Thomas Howard
Preceded by George Onslow; Sir Francis Vincent	Member of Parliament for Surrey; 1774–1780; With: Sir Francis Vincent 1774-1775; Sir Joseph Mawbey, Bt 1775-1780	Succeeded by Admiral the Hon. Augustus Keppel; Sir Joseph Mawbey, Bt
