= George Onslow =

George Onslow may refer to:

- George Onslow (British Army officer) (1731–1792), British politician and army officer
- George Onslow, 1st Earl of Onslow (1731–1814), British peer and politician
- George Onslow (composer) (1784–1853), French composer

== See also ==
- George Macarthur-Onslow (1875–1931), Australian general who served in World War I
