= Richard Onslow (British Army officer) =

British Army general

Lieutenant-General Richard Onslow MP
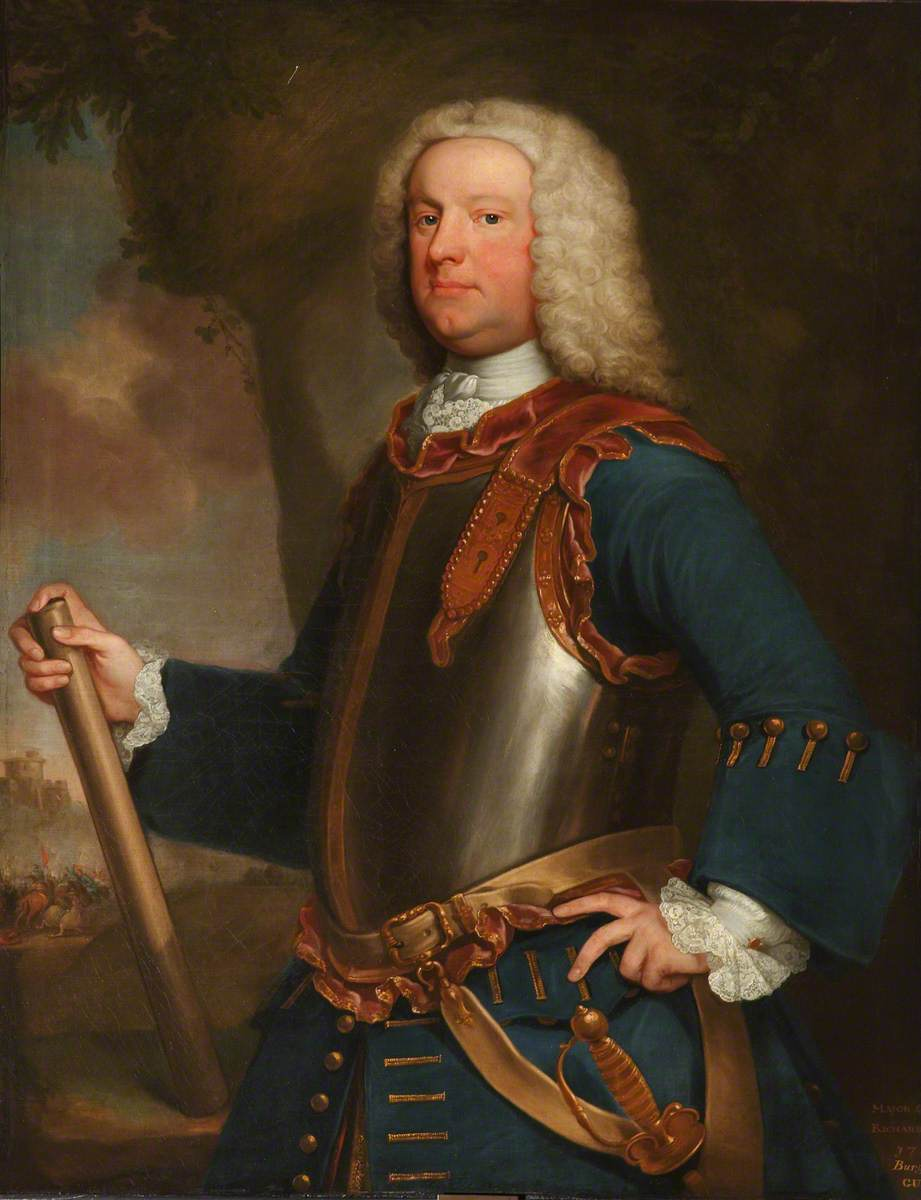
- Portrait by Hans Hysing
- Born: c. 1697
- Died: 16 March 1760
- Children: 4, including George, Richard, and Arthur

Lieutenant-General Richard Onslow (c. 1697 – 16 March 1760) was a British Army officer and politician. After the death of their parents, his older brother Arthur bought him a captain's commission in the British Army. He first saw action in the Anglo-Spanish War in 1727, after which he was returned to Parliament for the family borough of Guildford. His political contributions were negligible in comparison to his brother, and he continued to serve as a career officer, holding commands in the War of the Austrian Succession at Dettingen and Fontenoy. In 1759, he was appointed Governor of Plymouth and commander of the Western District, and died as a lieutenant-general the following year while presiding over two prominent courts-martial.

== Early life ==
He was the second son of Foot Onslow, Member of Parliament for Guildford. His older brother was Arthur Onslow, Speaker of the House of Commons from 1728 to 1761, and after the death of his father in 1710 and his mother in 1715, he and his four sisters were left in Arthur's care. As Richard had not been educated for the law or the church, Arthur thought, against the opinion of their friends, that Richard's courage and bodily stature suited him for the army. Accordingly, Arthur raised the money to allow Richard to purchase a commission as a captain in the 11th Regiment of Foot on 14 July 1716, a rank that allowed him to maintain his social standing among the rest of the family. Writing late in life, Arthur noted that Richard had "risen to be very high in the army...and with unblemished character in it", validating his choice.

When Arthur entered Parliament for the family borough of Guildford in 1720, he gave up to Richard the post of receiver general of the Post Office, which was not compatible with a Parliamentary seat and paid almost £400 per year. Richard exchanged into the 30th Regiment of Foot in 1719 and the 15th Regiment of Foot in 1721. During the 1722 election at Haslemere, where the Onslows had an interest, Richard became involved in a brawl with James Oglethorpe. Oglethorpe and his fellow Tory candidate Peter Burrell came upon Onslow and his companion, a Mr. Sharp. Burrell complained of Sharp's insulting electioneering practices, and Oglethorpe struck Sharp with his cane; when Onslow attempted to interpose, Oglethorpe drew on him. Onslow was injured in the thigh, but disarmed Oglethorpe; he was wounded again in the left hand when Oglethorpe attempted to recover his sword, but by now his temper had cooled, and he helped bind Onslow's wounds and summoned a surgeon for him. Onslow was promoted to captain lieutenant (and lieutenant-colonel in the Army) in the 1st Regiment of Foot Guards on 7 July 1724.

On 9 December 1726, he married his brother's sister-in-law, Rose Bridges, daughter and coheiress of John Bridges of Thames Ditton. She died in 1728 without children, and in 1730, he married again to Pooley Walton, daughter of Charles Walton and heiress of her uncle George Walton. They had four children:

- George Onslow (1731–1792)
- Sir Richard Onslow, 1st Baronet (1741–1817)
- Rev. Arthur Onslow (1746–1815)
- Elizabeth Onslow (d. 1800 or 1802), married Rev. Hon. George Hamilton and had issue.

== Active service and politics ==
On 9 March 1727, Onslow succeeded Richard Hele Treby as captain of one of the Guards companies sent to reinforce besieged Gibraltar. The Spanish lifted the siege in June, and Onslow then stood for Guildford on his family's interest, replacing Thomas Brodrick. Onslow was elected alongside his brother (who, however, chose to sit for Surrey) in August 1727. His receiver-generalship went to his second cousin Denzil Onslow of Stoughton. Richard continued to represent the borough until his death. A steady supporter of Government, he made no particular figure in Parliamentary affairs.

Onslow was commissioned colonel of the 39th Regiment of Foot in 1731. In 1734, he became accountant to his brother after the latter was appointed Treasurer of the Navy, holding the post until Arthur resigned the office in 1742. Richard transferred to become Colonel of the 8th (The King's) Regiment of Foot in 1739 (until 1745). He appointed Rev. Arthur Young, chaplain to his regiment. Young's son claimed that Onslow himself was not particularly religious, in part to escape the censure of his commander, the Duke of Cumberland.

On 20 February 1741, he was promoted to brigadier general, and sent to Germany with the British contingent in the War of the Austrian Succession. He fought at the Battle of Dettingen on 27 June 1743, and was afterwards promoted to major general on 13 July. On 30 April 1745, Onslow succeeded Viscount Cobham as colonel and captain of the 1st Troop of Horse Grenadier Guards, while Edward Wolfe took over the King's Regiment. He and Henry Hawley commanded the second line of cavalry at the Battle of Fontenoy. He was one of the generals present in London in November after the British Army in Flanders was recalled to suppress the Jacobite rising of 1745.

Onslow's last promotion, to lieutenant general, occurred on 10 October 1747. On 15 February 1752, he was appointed Governor of Fort William, and in 1759, was removed to become Governor of Plymouth and military commander of the Western District. In early 1760, he was called upon to preside over the court-martial of Lord George Sackville for his conduct at the Battle of Minden, and concurrently of Lord Charles Hay for remarks made against Lord Loudoun, but died of a stroke on 16 March 1760 while presiding over the latter trial.

In addition to his military career, he was a member of the original general court of the Society for Free British Fishery, founded in 1750.

== Bibliography ==
- Hamilton, F. W. (1874). The origin and history of the First or Grenadier Guards. Vol. II. London: John Murray.
- Skrine, Francis Henry (1906). Fontenoy and Great Britain's Share in the War of the Austrian Succession. Edinburgh and London: W. Blackwood & Sons. p. 131.
- Orford, Horace Walpole, 4th Earl of (1822). Memoirs of the last ten years of the reign of George II. Vol. II. London: Thomas Davison.
- Vulliamy, C. E. (1953). The Onslow family 1528-1874 with some Account of their times. Edinburgh: T. and A. Constable, Ltd.

Parliament of Great Britain
Preceded by Arthur Onslow; Thomas Brodrick	Member of Parliament for Guildford; 1727–1760; With: Arthur Onslow 1727–1728; Henry Vincent 1728–1734; Richard Onslow 1734–1740; Denzil Onslow 1740–1747; Sir John Elwill 1747–1760	Succeeded by Sir John Elwill; George Onslow
Military offices
Preceded by John Campbell	Colonel of Richard Onslow's Regiment of Foot; 1738–1739	Succeeded by Robert Dalway
Preceded by Charles Lenoe	Colonel of The King's Regiment of Foot; 1739–1745	Succeeded by Edward Wolfe
Preceded by The Viscount Cobham	Captain and Colonel of the 1st Troop Horse Grenadier Guards; 1745–1760	Succeeded by The Earl of Effingham
Preceded by Humphrey Bland	Governor of Fort William; 1752–1759	Succeeded by William Kingsley
Preceded by The Viscount Ligonier	Governor of Plymouth; 1759–1760	Succeeded by The Earl Waldegrave
