= Middleton Onslow =

Middleton Onslow (17 April 1732 – 1801) was an English landowner, who briefly sat in the House of Commons in 1774 and 1775 on behalf of the senior branch of his family.

== Early life ==
The elder son of Denzil Onslow and his wife Anne, he belonged to the Onslows of Drungewick, Sussex, a junior branch of the Surrey political family. Through his father, he was third cousin to George Onslow, later the Earl of Onslow.

== Political career ==
Middleton was put into Parliament for Rye at the 1774 election to hold the seat until George's son Tom should come of age to take the seat. No political activity on Middleton's part is recorded, and on 20 April 1775, he took the Manor of East Hendred to leave the seat and allow it to pass to Tom.

== Family ==
On 31 August 1769, Middleton married Anne, daughter of Trevor Borrett and widow of Edward John Reed. They had three children:

- Gen Denzil Onslow (1770–1838)
- Rev. Middleton Onslow (c.1774-1837), Rector of Bradford Peverell, married and had issue
- Maj. William Onslow, 4th Dragoons, married and had issue

Onslow sold the estate of Kevington to the Berens family.

Parliament of Great Britain
Preceded by John Norris; Rose Fuller	Member of Parliament for Rye; 1774–1775; With: Rose Fuller	Succeeded by Rose Fuller; Thomas Onslow
