= Sir Francis Vincent, 7th Baronet =

English country landowner and politician

Sir Francis Vincent, Bt

Member of Parliament for Surrey
- In office 1761–1775 Serving with George Onslow, James Scawen
- Preceded by: Arthur Onslow; Thomas Budgen
- Succeeded by: James Scawen; Sir Joseph Mawbey, Bt

Personal details
- Born: c. 1717
- Died: 22 May 1775 (aged 57–58)
- Spouse(s): Elizabeth Kilmaine (m. 1741; died 1744) Mary Howard (m. 1745; died 1757) Arabella Swymmer (m. 1761; died 1775)
- Children: 3
- Parent(s): Sir Henry Vincent, 6th Baronet; Elizabeth Sherman
- Education: Lincoln's Inn

Sir Francis Vincent, 7th Baronet, (c. 1717 – 22 May 1775) of Stoke D'Abernon, was an English country landowner and politician who sat in the House of Commons from 1761 to 1775.

== Early life ==
Vincent was born in c. 1717. He was the eldest son of Elizabeth Sherman and Sir Henry Vincent, 6th Baronet, MP for Guildford between 1728 and 1734. His sister, Hester Vincent, married John Smith de Burgh, 11th Earl of Clanricarde.

His paternal grandparents were Sir Francis Vincent, 5th Baronet, MP for Surrey, and Rebecca Ashe (a daughter of Jonathan Ashe, merchant of London). His maternal grandparents were Bezaliel Sherman (a Turkey merchant of London) and Annie Norton.

He was educated at Lincoln's Inn in 1734 and succeeded his father in the baronetcy on 10 January 1757.

== Career ==
The Vincent family had owned estates in Surrey since the early 17th century. His grandfather and great-great-grandfather, Sir Francis Vincent, 3rd Baronet, both represented the county in the Parliament of England.

He was Member of Parliament for Surrey from 1761 until his death on 22 May 1775.

== Personal life ==
Sir Francis was married three times. His first marriage was on 25 August 1741 to Elizabeth Kilmaine, the daughter and heiress of David Kilmaine, a London banker. She died on 22 November 1744 without issue.

His second marriage was on 13 March 1745 to Mary Howard, the daughter of Lt.-Gen. Hon. Thomas Howard of Great Bookham, Surrey, who served as Governor of Berwick, and Mary Moreton (the youngest daughter of William Moreton, Bishop of Meath). Before her death on 16 August 1757, they had two sons and a daughter:

- Sir Francis Vincent, 8th Baronet (1747–1791), who married Mary Chiswell, daughter of Trench Chiswell, MP for Aldborough, in 1779.
- Henry Dormer Vincent (1751–1833), who married Isabella Hervey, daughter of Hon. Felton Hervey, in 1794.
- Mary Vincent (1752–1823), who married Neil Primrose, 3rd Earl of Rosebery, son of James Primrose, 2nd Earl of Rosebery, in 1775.

His third marriage was in June 1761 to Arabella (née Astley) Swymmer (d. 1785), the daughter and co-heiress of Sir John Astley, 2nd Baronet, MP for Shrewsbury and Shropshire, and the widow of Anthony Langley Swymmer, MP for Southampton from 1747 to 1754.

Sir Francis died on 22 May 1775. He was succeeded by his eldest son, Francis. His widow died on 20 June 1785.

=== Descendants ===
Through his daughter Mary, he was a grandfather of Archibald John Primrose, 4th Earl of Rosebery, MP for Helston and Cashel.

Through his youngest son Henry, he was posthumously a grandfather of Rev. Sir Frederick Vincent, 11th Baronet (1798–1883).

Parliament of Great Britain
Preceded by Arthur Onslow; Thomas Budgen	Member of Parliament for Surrey; 1761 – 1775; With: George Onslow 1761-1774; James Scawen 1774- 1775	Succeeded by James Scawen; Sir Joseph Mawbey, Bt
Baronetage of England
Preceded by Henry Vincent	Baronet (of Stoke d'Abernon); 1757–1775	Succeeded by Francis Vincent
