= Richard Onslow =

Richard Onslow may refer to:

- Richard Onslow (Solicitor General) (1528–1571), Speaker of the House of Commons and Solicitor General
- Richard Onslow (Parliamentarian) (1601–1664), Member of the Long Parliament and the Cromwellian House of Lords, grandson of the above
- Richard Onslow, 1st Baron Onslow (1654–1717), Speaker of the House of Commons and Chancellor of the Exchequer, grandson of the above
- Lt.-Gen. Richard Onslow (British Army officer) (died 1760), Governor of Fort William and Plymouth
- Richard Onslow, 3rd Baron Onslow (1713–1776), Member of Parliament for Guildford and Lord Lieutenant of Surrey
- Adm. Sir Richard Onslow, 1st Baronet (1741–1817), British naval leader distinguished at the Battle of Camperdown
- Richard Onslow, 5th Earl of Onslow (1876–1945), diplomat, parliamentary secretary and government minister
- Richard Onslow (Royal Navy officer) (1904–1975), British admiral
- Richard Onslow (priest) (1776–1849), Archdeacon of Worcester
