= Thomas Scawen (died 1774) =

British politician

Thomas Scawen (died 1774) was a British politician who sat in the House of Commons from 1727 to 1741.

Scawen was the son of Sir Thomas Scawen and his wife Martha Wessell, the daughter of Abraham Wessell, a London merchant. In 1722, he inherited the property of his uncle Sir William Scawen which included Carshalton Park. He married Tryphena Russell, daughter of Lord James Russell of Maidwell, son of William Russell, 1st Duke of Bedford, in Northamptonshire, on 8 June 1725.

Scawen was returned as Member of Parliament for Surrey in a by-election on 12 April 1727. He was an opposition Whig. At the 1727 general election, he joined interests with John Walter, the other outgoing Member, against Arthur Onslow. Walter tried to step down when it became apparent that the poll was going in Onslow's favour, but the sheriff ruled that the poll must proceed. Scawen obtained a small majority over Walter by the second votes of Onslow's supporters. In the 1734 general election, he was re-elected unopposed alongside Onslow. He voted regularly with the Opposition. He did not stand again in 1741, but in 1747, he used his interest at Mitchell to bring in Thomas Clarke for that borough at the request of Lord Chancellor Hardwicke. He also brought in his son James Scawen at Mitchell in 1761.

Scawen died on 11 February 1774. His daughter Tryphena married Henry Bathurst, 2nd Earl Bathurst.

== Sources ==
Parliament of Great Britain
Preceded by John Walter; Sir Nicholas Carew	Member of Parliament for Surrey; 1727–1741; With: John Walter 1727; Arthur Onslow 1727-1741	Succeeded by Arthur Onslow; The Lord Baltimore
