= Denzil Onslow of Stoughton =

British politician

Denzil Onslow of Stoughton (c. 1698 – 15 November 1765) of Mickleham, Surrey was a British politician. A member of the influential Onslow family of Surrey, he held a number of lucrative Government posts, and died owing a relatively large sum to the Treasury through mismanagement of his accounts.

== Personal life ==
He was the son of Richard Onslow (d. 1719) and Sarah Manning, and grandson of Sir Henry Onslow, of Drungewick, who was a younger son of Sir Richard Onslow. His mother was Sarah, daughter of Thomas Calvert.

A member of a junior branch of the Onslow family, which held a powerful Parliamentary interest in Surrey, he married Anne Middleton, the daughter of his second cousin Anne and Thomas Middleton. They had three sons:

- Denzil [Denzell] Onslow (29 Jan 1731 – bef. 1765)
- Middleton Onslow (17 April 1732 – 1801)
- Capt. Richard Onslow (1734 – aft. 1765)

== Career ==
Denzil succeeded his second cousin Richard Onslow in 1727 as receiver general of the Post Office when the latter wished to enter Parliament on the family interest at Guildford. Denzil, in turn, gave up the office when he, too, entered Parliament for Guildford in 1740 at a by-election, triggered when his nephew Richard succeeded to a peerage. Elected again in 1741, he was a consistent supporter of the Government, and was appointed in 1743 as Paymaster of the Works. He did not stand again at the election of 1747, as the Place Act 1742 made incompatible his seat on the Board of Works with a place in Parliament.

He was questioned over errors in his Post Office accounts in 1748, but remained paymaster until 1755. In 1753, he inherited Kevington Hall (which has been remodelled internally into the county primary school of St Mary Cray, Greater London) from his first cousin, Richard Manning. He became instead a commissioner of stamp duties until 1757, and then of the salt office until his death in 1765. In 1764, the Treasury was inquiring into his arrears as Paymaster of the Works, and he died owing over £1500 (equivalent to £229,145 in 2025) to the Treasury, a debt still unsettled in 1783.

Parliament of Great Britain
| Preceded by Richard Onslow; Hon. Richard Onslow | Member of Parliament for Guildford; 1740–1747; With: Richard Onslow | Succeeded by Richard Onslow; Sir John Elwill |
