= Helen Vincent, Viscountess D'Abernon =

British noblewoman, socialite and diarist

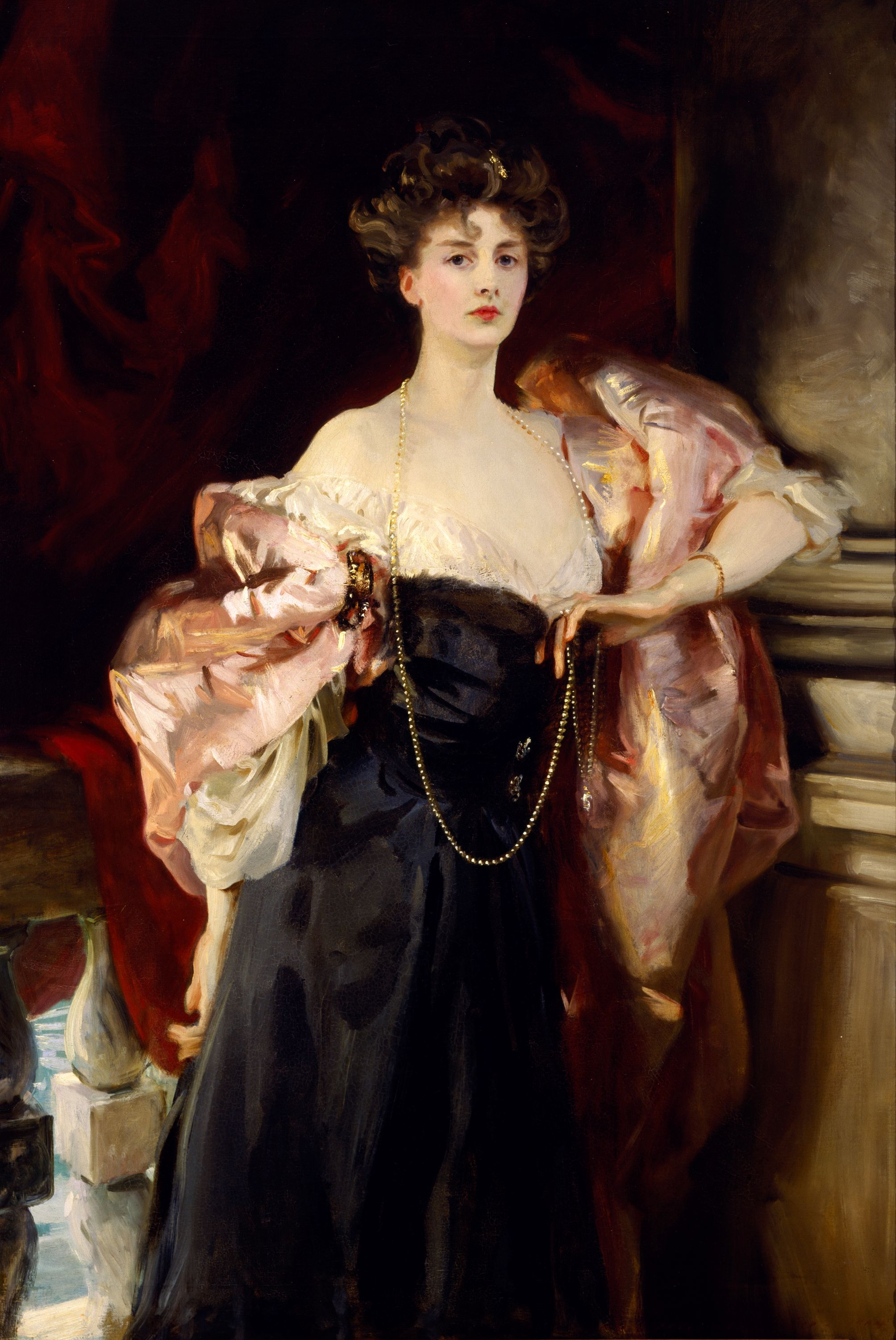
Portrait of Lady Helen Vincent, Viscountess D'Abernon (1904) by John Singer Sargent. Birmingham Museum of Art, Birmingham, Alabama

Helen Venetia Vincent, Viscountess D'Abernon (née Duncombe; 6 March 1866 – 16 May 1954) was a British noblewoman, socialite and diarist.

== Early life ==
Lady Helen was born at 20 Grosvenor Square, Mayfair, London, the daughter of William Duncombe and Mabel Violet Graham. The family seat was at Duncombe Park in Helmsley, North Yorkshire, England. Her father was elevated to the peerage as Baron Feversham in 1867 and again as Earl of Feversham in 1868. She and her sister, Hermione, Duchess of Leinster, were renowned as leading beauties in their circle.

== Marriage ==
Helen married Sir Edgar Vincent, then a governor of the Imperial Ottoman Bank in Constantinople on 24 September 1890. In 1899 he was elected a Member of Parliament for Exeter. Lady Helen, in that period, was "the most celebrated hostess of her age and was 'by reason of her outstanding beauty, intelligence and charm, one of the most resplendent figures'".

== Activities and later years ==
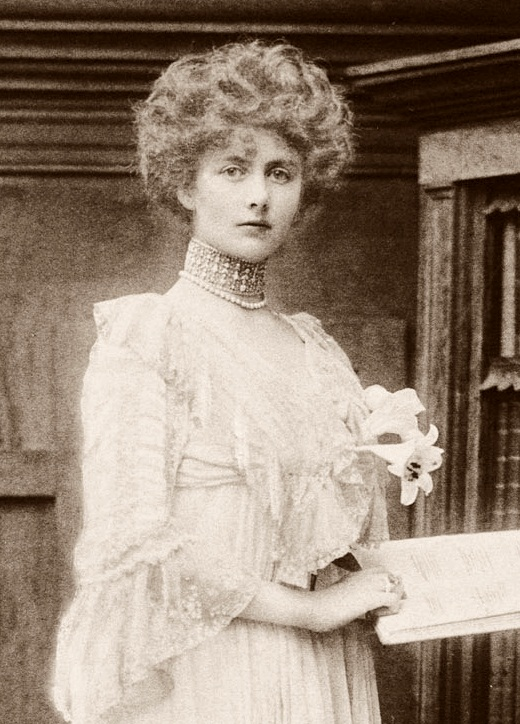
Lady Helen Vincent

Helen was associated with "the Souls", a salon of noted intellectuals of the day which included Arthur Balfour, George Curzon, Henry James and Edith Wharton. She is believed to have been the model for the characters of Lady Thisbe Crowborough in Max Beerbohm's story Hilary Maltby and Stephen Braxton in Seven Men (1919) and for Lady Irene Silvester in Maurice Baring's story "A Luncheon Party" (1925).

In 1904 during an extended visit to Venice, Lady Helen's portrait was painted by John Singer Sargent. That work is now part of the permanent collection of the Birmingham Museum of Art in Birmingham, Alabama, United States.

During World War I Lady Helen trained as a nurse anaesthetist and treated thousands of patients. Many letters describing her war work were sent to her friend Teresa Hulton, later the 8th Lady Berwick of Attingham Park.

Lady Helen accompanied her husband (created 1st Baron D'Abernon in 1914) as he served on the Interallied Mission to Poland and as the British Ambassador to the Weimar Republic in the early 1920s. During this time the Baroness kept a diary of her experiences, parts of which were published in 1946 as Red Cross and Berlin Embassy, 1915-1926: Extracts from the Diaries of Viscountess D'Abernon.

At the end of his diplomatic mission, Sir Edgar was elevated to 1st Viscount D'Abernon on 1 January 1926, and then also succeeded his brother, Francis, as 16th Baronet of Stoke d'Abernon. The Vincents did not have children and Sir Edgar's titles died with him in 1941. Lady D'Abernon died at age 84 on 16 May 1954.
