= Frank Vincent (disambiguation) =

Frank Vincent (1937–2017) was an American actor and musician.

Frank Vincent may also refer to:

- Frank Vincent (judge) (born 1937), Australian jurist
- Frank Vincent (American football) (1932–2010), American football player and coach
- Frank Vincent (footballer) (born 1999), English footballer
- Captain Frank Vincent, the commander of the Pendleton volunteers attacked by Egan (Paiute)

== See also ==
- Francis Vincent (disambiguation)
