= Sir Percy Vincent, 1st Baronet =

Lord Mayor of London from 1935 to 1936

Sir Percy Vincent, 1st Baronet (1868 – 22 January 1943) was a British businessman who served as Lord Mayor of London from 1935 to 1936.

Previously, he was Sheriff of the City of London for 1926 to 1927. He was Alderman between 1929 and 1942.

He was the first Lord Mayor to visit Canada during his term of office.

== See also ==
- Vincent baronets
