= George Onslow (British Army officer) =

British politician and army officer (1731–1792)

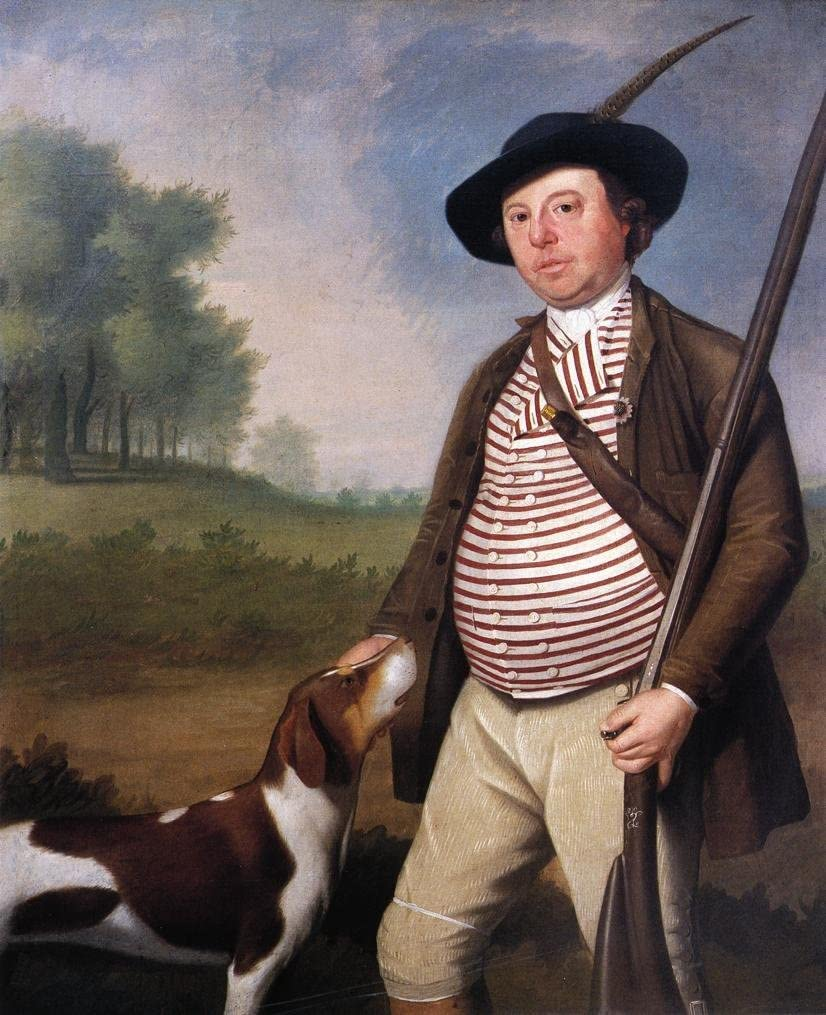
- portrait by Ralph Earl
- Born: 28 April 1731; Guildford
- Died: 12 November 1792 (aged 61); Dunsborough House
- Occupation: Officer, politician
- Spouse(s): Jane Thorp
- Children: Pooley Onslow, George Walton Onslow, Arthur Onslow
- Parent(s): Richard Onslow; Pooley Walton
- Relatives: Elizabeth Onslow, Sir Richard Onslow, 1st Baronet, Arthur Onslow
- Rank: lieutenant colonel

Lieutenant colonel George Onslow (28 April 1731 – 12 November 1792) was a British politician and army officer, the eldest son of Richard Onslow and his second wife Pooley, and the nephew of Arthur Onslow, Speaker of the House of Commons.

Onslow was born in Guildford, Surrey in 1731. He entered the British Army as an ensign in the 1st Regiment of Foot Guards on 17 February 1748 and became a captain in John Guise's Regiment of Foot on 12 January 1751.

Onslow continued to rise in the Army, and was promoted major in the 57th Regiment of Foot on 3 August 1757. He returned to his original regiment, the Foot Guards, on 27 March 1759 with the rank of captain-lieutenant and was promoted lieutenant-colonel on 7 November 1759. He entered the House of Commons in March 1760 upon the death of his father, replacing him as one of the members for Guildford. He was known as "Colonel Onslow" in the Commons to distinguish him from his first cousin George Onslow, later Earl of Onslow.

Onslow began his parliamentary career as one of the Rockingham Whigs, like his cousin George. Onslow was the only member to declare that issue no. 45 of The North Briton was not a libel on the King, and he opposed the expulsion of Wilkes from the House. As a reward for his support of the Rockingham administration, he received the post of Out-Ranger of Windsor Forest for life in 1765. In 1766, he voted for the repeal of the Stamp Act.

However, Onslow's political views then took a decidedly conservative turn, supporting the Grafton and then the North ministries. In 1770, he opposed the resolutions of Burke on the disturbances in North America. In the following year, Onslow took a leading role in the efforts to block printers from reporting debates in the Commons. The resulting confrontation, fueled in turn by a report that described him as "little cocking George" (an allusion to his enjoyment of cockfighting), was a severe blow to the prestige of the North ministry, and Onslow was hanged in effigy on Tower Hill alongside an effigy of Sir Fletcher Norton, speaker and fellow-member for Guildford.

Onslow remained a steadfast supporter of North, opposing efforts to make peace after the surrender of Burgoyne at Saratoga. He also opposed the petitions for economic reform debated in 1780, and the Contractor's Bill in 1781. He voted against the motion of no confidence that unseated the ministry in March 1782, and followed North into opposition. Onslow supported the return of North in the Fox-North Coalition, but retired from Parliament in 1784.

Onslow died in 1792 at Dunsborough House, Ripley, Surrey, after suffering a carriage accident. He had married Jane Thorp, sister of Robert Thorp, on 29 July 1752. They had five children:

- Richard Onslow (b. 1754)
- Pooley Onslow (b. 1758), married on 23 January 1788 Rear Admiral Sir Francis Samuel Drake, 1st Baronet; married on 13 June 1801 Arthur Onslow (1759–1833)
- George Onslow (b. 1764)
- Rev. George Walton Onslow (1768–1844)
- Rev. Arthur Onslow (1773–1851), married Marianna Campbell, by whom he was grandfather of Arthur Alexander Walton Onslow and Alexander Onslow, and ancestor of Cranley Onslow; married Caroline Mangles, by whom he was the ancestor of the Hughes-Onslow family.

Parliament of Great Britain
Preceded by Sir John Elwill, Bt; Richard Onslow	Member of Parliament for Guildford; 1760–1784; With: Sir John Elwill, Bt 1760–1768; Sir Fletcher Norton 1768–1782; William Norton 1782–1784	Succeeded by Thomas Onslow; Chapple Norton
Political offices
Preceded by Benjamin Bathurst	Out-Ranger of Windsor Forest; 1765–1792	Succeeded by Thomas Onslow
