= Sir John Elwill, 1st Baronet =

English politician

Sir John Elwill, 1st Baronet (c. 1640 – 25 April 1717) was an English aristocrat and politician.

He was the eldest son of Exeter grocer John Elwill and his wife Rebecca Pole, and was baptised on 24 September 1643. He matriculated at Exeter College, Oxford, on 25 March 1659, and was destined for a career in the Church but he became a merchant in Exeter. He was Receiver General for Devon; and was elected Member of Parliament in the Parliament of England for Bere Alston in 1681, 1689–90, and 1695–98. He was High Sheriff of Devon for 1699.

He was knighted at Kensington on 28 April 1696, and was created a baronet in the Baronetage of Great Britain on 25 August 1709.

He married Frances Bamfylde, fifth daughter of Sir John Bamfylde, 1st Baronet, by his wife Gertrude Coplestone. She died without issue. He then married Anne Leigh, of Egham in Surrey. She died before October 1716. He was succeeded by his eldest son, John, who died without issue on 10 September 1727.

== See also ==
- Sir John Elwill, 4th Baronet

Baronetage of Great Britain
New creation	Baronet (of Exeter); 1709–1717	Succeeded by John Elwill
