= Edward Onslow =

British aristocrat

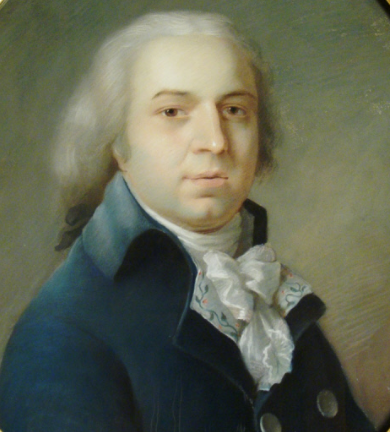
Edward Onslow, in later life

Edward Onslow FRS (9 April 1758 – 18 October 1829) was a British aristocrat, the younger son of George Onslow, 1st Earl of Onslow.

== Public life ==
Onslow matriculated in 1774 at Christ Church, Oxford. He briefly sat as Member of Parliament for Aldborough in 1780. He was elected the same year as a fellow of the Royal Society.

== Scandal ==
In 1781, Onslow was involved in a homosexual scandal, and was forced to resign his seat in Parliament (by accepting the Stewardship of East Hendred) and flee to France. A newspaper report from 4 May related the story as between a "man of fashion" and a "Hibernian", on 2 May, and how a magistrate refused to take an "information" on it, and refused to name a charge in making an arrest. At that point Thomas Erskine was set to challenge the magistrate in the Court of King's Bench, for having succumbed to pressure from a Lord. The trajectory of the society scandal in the first week of May is given in letters of George Selwyn and Anthony Storer to the Earl of Carlisle. Onslow made a confession of uncontrolled lust to his father. According to Robert Holloway, in his 1813 book on the Vere Street Coterie, Onslow had been questioned by a group including Sir Francis Vincent, 8th Baronet.

Details of the matter were given by James Stephen in his Memoirs. Onslow offended Felix or Phelim McCarthy (also Macarty or Macartey) by advances in a public place, the Royal Academy. Lieut.-Col. Michael Cox of the 1st Foot Guards vouched for McCarthy's character; McCarthy was Irish, and Holloway wrote of suspicion that this "Irish adventurer" intended to "extort money from the nobleman" by blackmail. Cox was connected to the Irish Cox baronetcy as a nephew of Sir Richard Cox, 2nd Baronet. In the end McCarthy was paid off with 500 guineas.

=== Sampson overcome by a Philistian, 1782 Gillray print ===
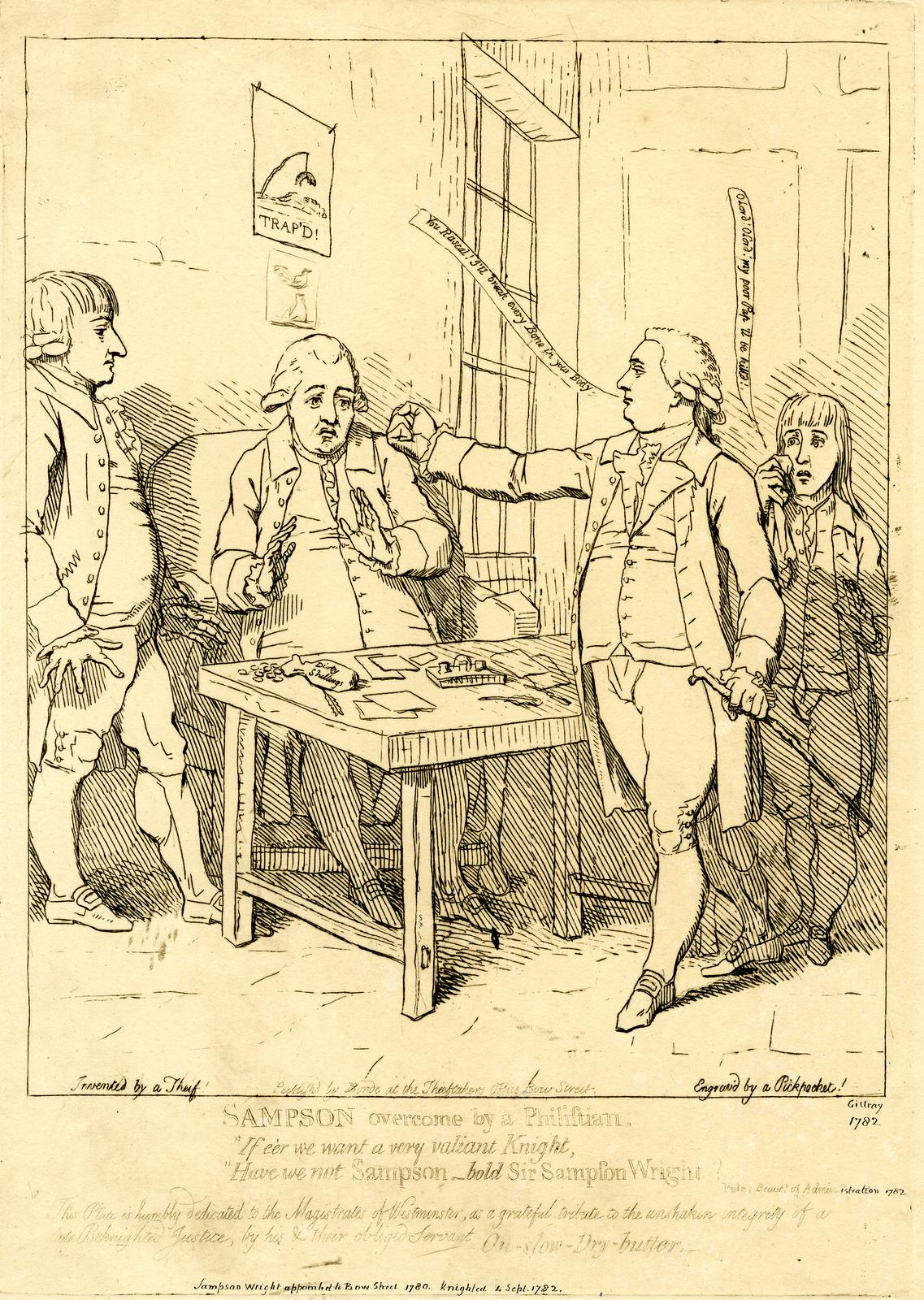
Sampson overcome by a Philistian, satirical print by James Gillray

A satirical print by James Gillray, dated after 1 October 1782, shows Sampson Wright, Chief Metropolitan Stipendiary Magistrate in London as successor to John Fielding. In the 19th century, Thomas Wright and Robert Harding Evans wrote "We are persuaded that this caricature refers to some occurrence related to some member of Lord Onslow's family, from the dedication being signed On-Slow Dry-Butter."

Wright, in an arm-chair,

...shrinks back, holding up his hands, as a man standing in front of the table thrusts his fist towards his face, saying, "You Rascal! I'll break every Bone in your Body".

The bag on the table marked "Dirty Shillings" alludes to the Bow Street magistracy's use of shillings paid for swearing affidavits (or taken as fines).

The inscription reads "If e'er we want a very valiant Knight, Have we not Sampson – bold Sir Sampson Wright Vide Beauts of Adminn. This Plate is humbly dedicated to the Magistrates of Westminster, as a grateful tribute to the unshaken integrity of a late Beknighted Justice, by their obliged Servant On - slow - Dry - Butter. Invented by a Theif Engrav'd by a Pickpocket! Publishd by Bonde at the Thieftakers office Bow Street." The couplet on Wright is from "The Beauties of Administration" (1782), an anonymous poem of political satire aimed at corruption.

Samuel Drybutter ("Ganymede"), a "well-known homosexual", appeared in a satirical print in 1771. In William Jackson's 1776 poem Sodom and Onan he was a metonym for homosexuals able to evade the law.

== Family ==
On 7 March 1783, Onslow married Marie Rosalie de Bourdeilles de Brantôme (d. 1842). One of their sons was George Onslow, the classical composer. Their son Maurice was the father of the French genre painter Édouard Onslow (1830–1904). Marie was possessed of a considerable dowry, and Onslow spent the rest of his life as a country gentleman in France.

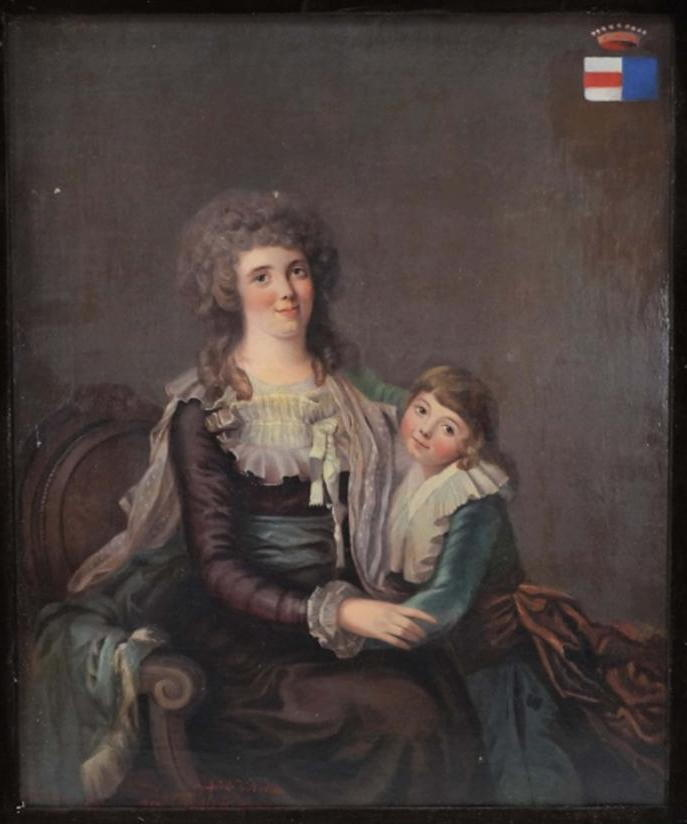
Marie Rosalie de Bourdeilles de Brantôme with her son George Onslow

Parliament of Great Britain
Preceded by Sir Richard Sutton, Bt; Charles Mellish	Member of Parliament for Aldborough; 1780–1781; With: Charles Mellish	Succeeded by Charles Mellish; Sir Samuel Brudenell Fludyer, Bt
