= Vincent baronets =

Baronetcy in the Baronetage of the United Kingdom

There have been two baronetcies created for persons with the surname Vincent, one in the Baronetage of England and one in the Baronetage of the United Kingdom.

The Vincent Baronetcy, of Stoke d'Abernon in the County of Surrey, was created in the Baronetage of England on 26 July 1620 for Francis Vincent. For more information on this creation, see the Viscount D'Abernon.

The Vincent Baronetcy, of Watton in the County of Norfolk, was created in the Baronetage of the United Kingdom on 18 January 1937 for Percy Vincent, Lord Mayor of London from 1935 to 1936.

== Vincent baronets, of Stoke d'Abernon (1620) ==
- see the Viscount D'Abernon

== Vincent baronets, of Watton (1937) ==
- Sir Percy Vincent, 1st Baronet (1868–1943), for a time Lord Mayor of London
- Sir Lacey Eric Vincent, 2nd Baronet (1902–1963)
- Sir William Percy Maxwell Vincent, 3rd Baronet (born 1945)

The heir apparent is the present holder's son Edward Mark William Vincent (born 1978).

Coat of arms of the Vincent baronets of Watton
Crest In front of two bird-bolts points downwards saltirewise Or a Labrador retriever dog statant Sable. Escutcheon Azure a chevron between two garbs in chief and in base a castle all Or. Motto Fortitudine Et Conatu
