= Richard Onslow, 3rd Baron Onslow =

British peer and politician

Richard Onslow, 3rd Baron Onslow KB (1713 – 8 October 1776) was a British peer and politician, styled Hon. Richard Onslow from 1717 to 1740.

He was the son of Thomas Onslow, 2nd Baron Onslow of Clandon Park, Surrey and educated at Eton College (1725-8) and Sidney Sussex College, Cambridge.

In 1734, Onslow was returned as Member of Parliament for Guildford, holding that position until 1740. In that year, he succeeded his father Thomas as Lord Onslow, and also succeeded him in his offices of High Steward of (the borough of) Guildford and Lord Lieutenant of Surrey.

The family seat remains Clandon Park, East and West Clandon, Surrey; however, Clandon Park House is now a National Trust mansion with its gardens, which was for the most part commissioned by his father. On 16 May 1741, he married Mary Elwill (d. 19 April 1812), daughter of Sir Edmund Elwill, 3rd Baronet at her mother's residence in Clifford Street in Mayfair; the marriage was childless. Lord Onslow received an LL.D. from the University of Cambridge in 1749 and was made a Knight Companion of the Order of the Bath in 1752. Upon his death in 1776, he was succeeded by special remainder in the barony by his second cousin, George Onslow, then Baron Cranley and later Earl of Onslow.

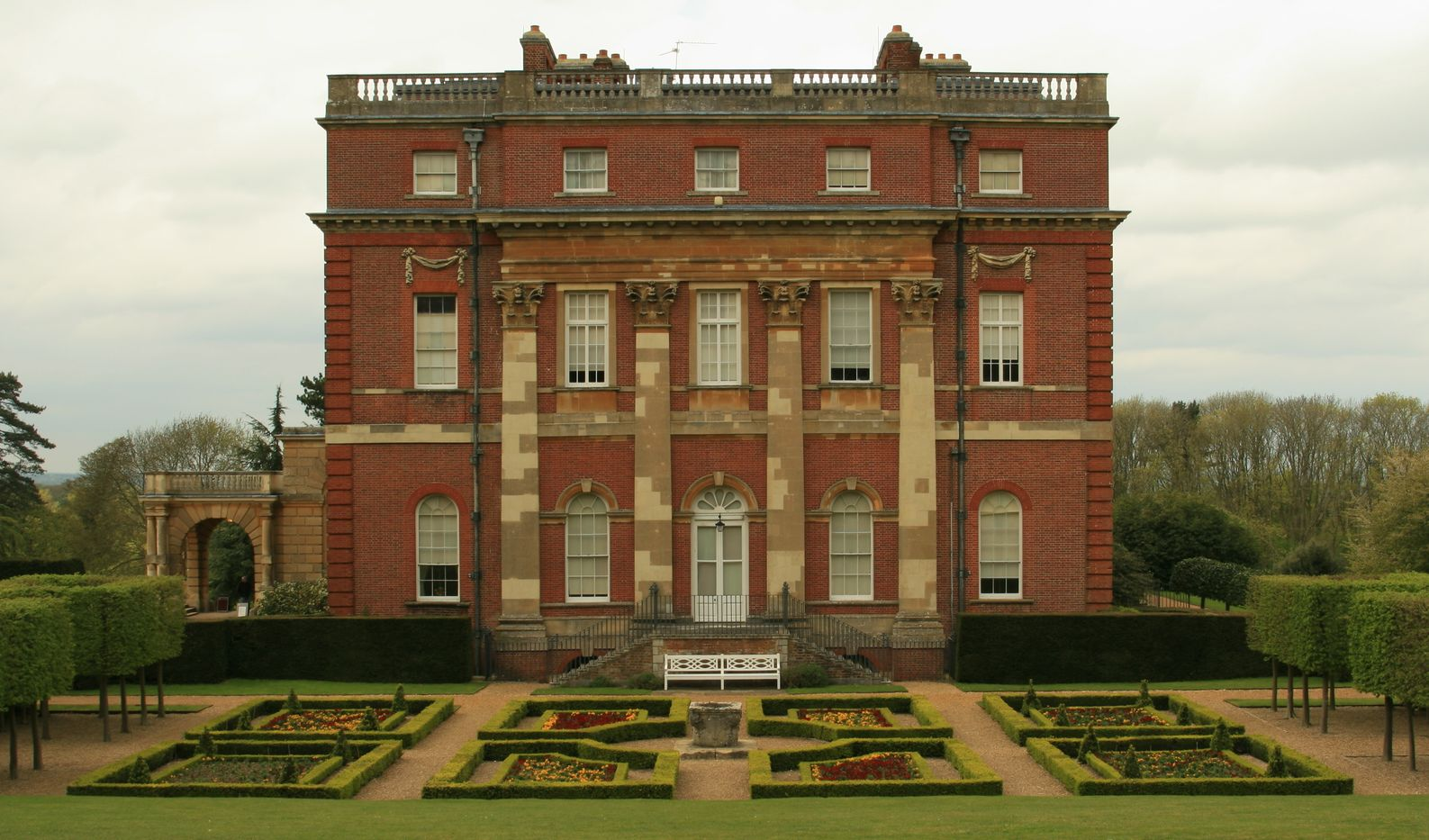
Clandon Park House was transformed from a large manor house to a lavish english country house by his father, but the 3rd Lord Onslow had its interiors finished. It features a two-storey Marble Hall and marble chimney and other pieces by the Flemish sculptor Michael Rysbrack.

Parliament of Great Britain
| Preceded by Henry Vincent; Richard Onslow | Member of Parliament for Guildford; 1734–1740; With: Richard Onslow | Succeeded by Richard Onslow; Denzil Onslow |
Honorary titles
| Preceded by The 3rd Lord Onslow | Lord Lieutenant of Surrey; 1740–1776 | Succeeded by The 4th Lord Onslow |
Peerage of Great Britain
| Preceded by Thomas Onslow | Baron Onslow; 1740–1776 | Succeeded by George Onslow |
