= Arthur Young (divine) =

English clergyman and religious writer

Arthur Young (1693–1759) was an English clergyman of the Church of England and a religious writer. He was much concerned with the "idolatrous corruptions" he found in early religion.

== Life ==
Young was born in 1693, the son of Bartholomew Young (died 12 August 1724) of Bradfield Combust in Suffolk. He was educated at Pembroke Hall, Cambridge, graduating LL.B. in 1716, and proceeding LL.D. in 1728. In 1719 he was instituted to the rectories of Bradfield Combust and Bradfield St Clare. On 27 June 1746 he was installed a prebendary of Canterbury and in 1748 presented to the vicarage of Exning in Suffolk, with a dispensation allowing him to hold it with Bradfield St Clare. He was also chaplain to Arthur Onslow, speaker of the House of Commons and a Justice of the Peace for Suffolk.

Young died on 26 June 1759 at Bradfield Combust, where he had inherited from his father an estate of about 200 acres.

== Family ==
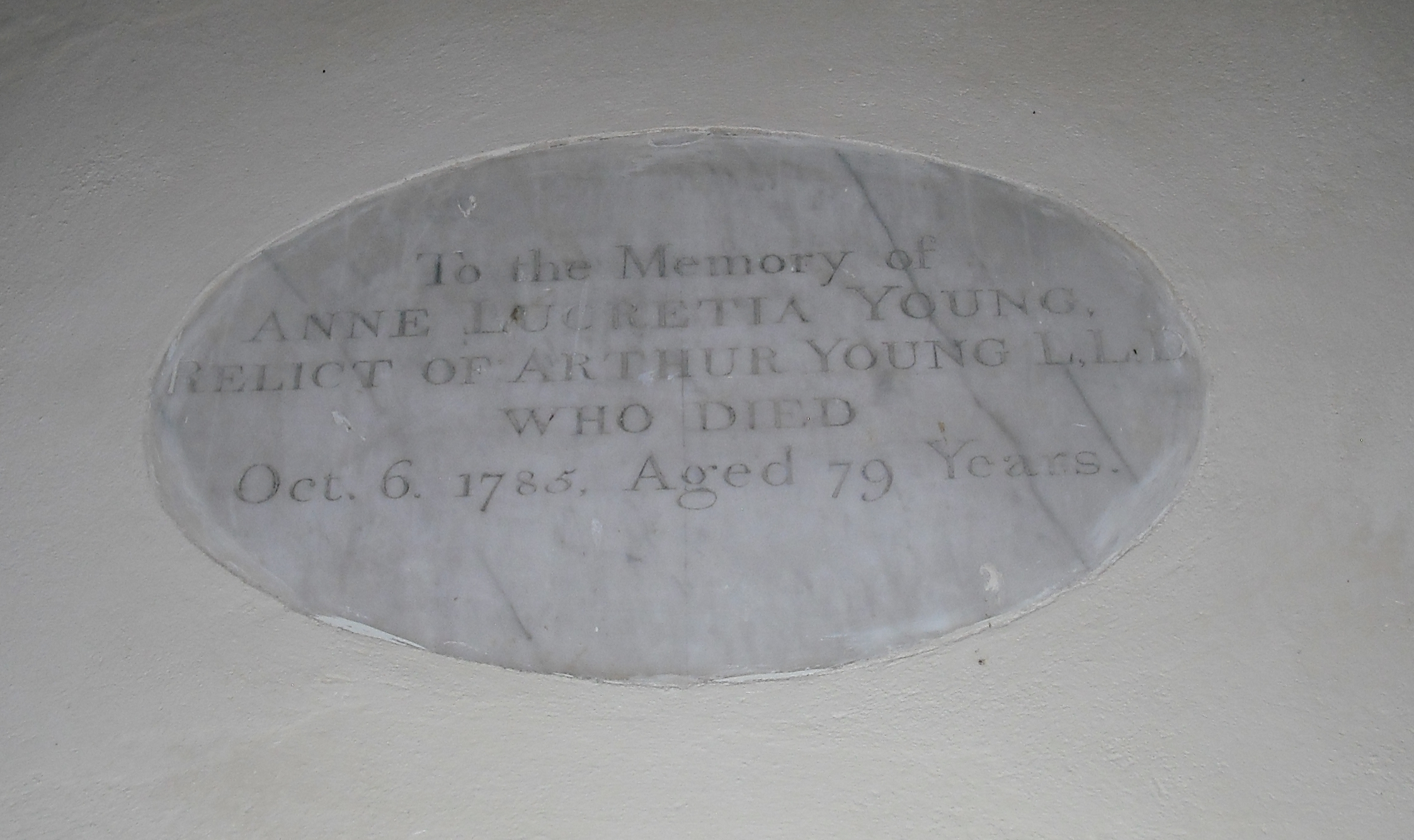
Memorial plaque for Anne Lucretia Young at All Saints' Church, Bradfield Combust

Young married Anna Lucretia, daughter of John Coussmaker of Weybridge, Surrey. They had two sons, John and Arthur, and a daughter, Elizabeth Mary, who married John Tomlinson of East Barnet. The elder son John Young, fellow of Eton, broke his neck in 1786 while hunting with George III. In 1793 the younger son, Arthur, was appointed Secretary to the newly created Board of Agriculture.

== Works ==
- An Historical Dissertation on Idolatrous Corruptions in Religion from the Beginning of the World, and on the Methods taken by Divine Providence in reforming them, London, 1734, 2 vols. 8vo. This sets out to explain the rise of Judaism and Christianity in place of idolatry.
- A Dissertation on the Gospel Demoniacks, London, 1760, 8vo. This was prompted by a reply from Richard Smalbroke, Bishop of St. David's, to Thomas Woolston's Discourse on the Miracles of Our Saviour and published posthumously.
