= Edgar Vincent, 1st Viscount D'Abernon =

British politician

The Right Honourable The Viscount D'Abernon GCB GCMG PC FRS
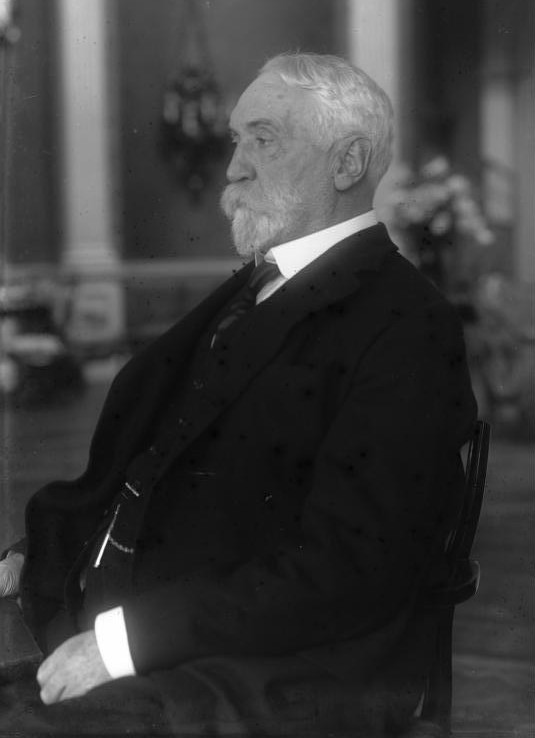
- Lord D'Abernon in 1926

British Ambassador to Berlin
- In office 1920–1925
- Preceded by: Victor Hay
- Succeeded by: Sir Ronald Lindsay

Member of Parliament for Exeter
- In office 1899–1906
- Preceded by: Henry Northcote
- Succeeded by: Sir George Kekewich

Personal details
- Born: Edgar Vincent; 19 August 1857 Slinfold, West Sussex, England
- Died: 1 November 1941 (aged 84) Hove, England
- Party: Conservative
- Spouse: Helen Venetia Duncombe (m. 1890)
- Parent(s): Sir Frederick Vincent, 11th Baronet; Maria Copley
- Education: Eton College

Arms of Vincent: Azure, three quatrefoils argent

Edgar Vincent, 1st Viscount D'Abernon, GCB, GCMG, PC, FRS (19 August 1857 – 1 November 1941) was a British politician, diplomat, art collector and author. He played an important role in the negotiations behind the 1925 Locarno Pact between Germany and its neighbours.

== Early life ==
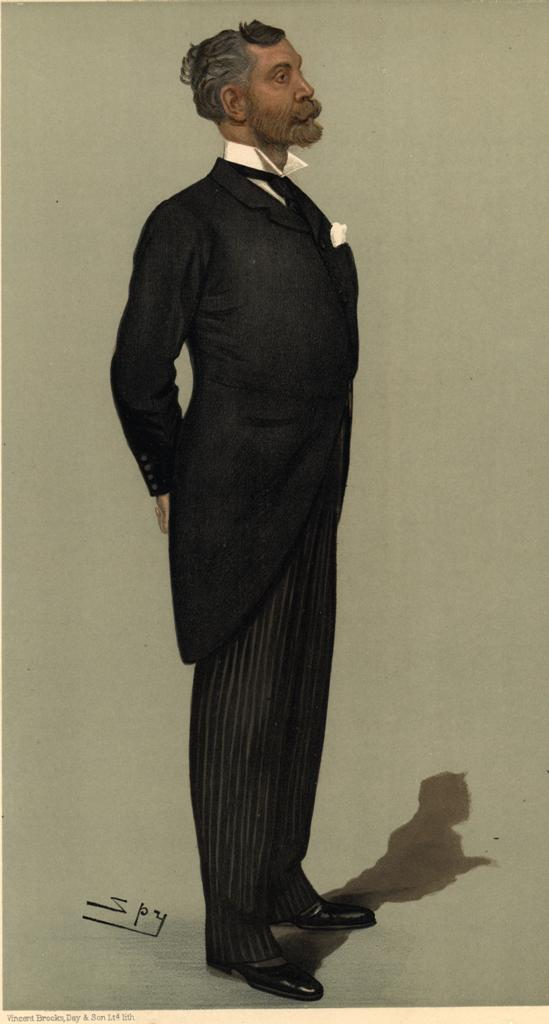
Caricature by Spy (Leslie Ward) in Vanity Fair magazine (20 April 1899)

Vincent was born at Slinfold, West Sussex on 19 August 1857. He was the youngest son of Sir Frederick Vincent, 11th Baronet of Stoke D'Abernon (1798–1883) and, his second wife, Maria Copley (d. 1899). Among his older siblings were brothers Sir William Vincent, 12th Baronet and Sir Frederick d'Abernon Vincent, 15th Baronet, whom he succeeded as 16th Baronet in 1936.

He was educated at Eton College for the diplomatic service. Instead, he spent five years as a member of the Coldstream Guards before coming into the service as secretary to Lord Edmond FitzMaurice, Queen's Commissioner on the East Rumelian Question.

== Career ==
Vincent was appointed Commissioner for the Evacuation of Thessaly (ceded to Greece by Turkey) and advised the Egyptian government on financial matters from 1883 to 1889. That year, he became governor of the Imperial Ottoman Bank. One of his policies was to get the Bank involved in South African mining shares on European stock exchanges. This caused a speculation craze in Constantinople where tens of thousands of people bought South African mining shares, a lot of them with money loaned from the Ottoman Bank. This led to a run on the Bank in late 1895 and then a crash in the share values, followed by an international panic and the financial ruin of many of those who invested in the shares. Vincent, who personally made a fortune from the shares, was heavily condemned for his role in the disaster.

In 1896, the banking office in Constantinople was occupied by a group of armed Armenians who threatened to destroy the building with bombs. Vincent escaped through a skylight and notified the Turkish authorities at the Sublime Porte and secured a negotiator from the Russian Embassy. The attackers agreed to surrender their bombs in exchange for safe passage to exile in France, being conducted on Sir Edgar's private vessel.

=== Member of Parliament ===
In 1899, he was elected a Conservative Member of Parliament for Exeter. He was less a true Conservative than a personal devotee of the Conservative leader, A. J. Balfour. He held the seat until losing to a Liberal in 1906. He opposed the Conservative policy of Tariff Reform and unsuccessfully stood for the Liberal Party in Colchester in December 1910. In July 1914 he was raised to the peerage as Baron D'Abernon of Esher, Surrey, upon the recommendation of the Prime Minister, H. H. Asquith.

=== Poland ===
D'Abernon was part of the Interallied Mission to Poland in July 1920, during the Polish-Soviet War. Later this experience provided material for his book The Eighteenth Decisive Battle of the World: Warsaw, 1920 (1931).

=== Ambassador to Germany ===
Monument to Edgar Vincent, 1st Viscount D'Abernon, St Mary's Church, Stoke d'Abernon, Surrey

From 1920 to 1925, D'Abernon was the British Ambassador to Berlin. In September 1921 he wrote that the success of the Inter-Allied Military Commission of Control, which reported on German disarmament, meant that there would be no military danger from Germany for many years and that it would be impossible for the Germans to conceal the manufacture of heavy weaponry. In February 1922 he criticised the idea of a military alliance between Britain and France:

The fundamental criticism...is that England undertakes definite and very extensive responsibilities in order to avoid a danger which she believes to be largely imaginary. An armed attack by Germany on France within the next twenty-five years is admittedly improbable, an attack by Germany on England in the same period even more so...the whole tone of the French is to assume that the real danger to the future peace of Europe is military aggression by Germany.

On 9 February 1925 D'Abernon wrote that it was necessary "to abandon the view that Germans are such congenital liars that there is no practical advantage in obtaining from them any engagement or declaration. On this assumption progress is impossible. Personally I regard the Germans as more reliable and more bound to written engagements than many other nations".

Lord Vansittart called D'Abernon "the pioneer of appeasement". General J. H. Morgan also called D'Abernon "the apostle of ′appeasement′" and claimed D'Abernon "did not believe in the possibility, much less the probability, of a German military revival".

=== Later life ===
After his retirement from the foreign service, D'Abernon devoted his time to directorships of numerous domestic organisations such as the Lawn Tennis Association, the Race Course Betting Control Board, the Medical Research Council, and the National Institute of Industrial Psychology, and the Royal Mint advisory committee. He was also a trustee of the National and Tate Galleries and President of the Royal Statistical Society from 1926 to 1928.

== Personal life ==
D'Abernon married the renowned beauty, Lady Helen Venetia Duncombe, daughter of William Duncombe, 1st Earl of Feversham, in 1890. Together they shared a love of society and the fine arts, especially English painting. Both had portraits made by John Singer Sargent. She posed for hers in 1904 at their villa, the Palazzo Giustinian, in Venice. Vincent was Chairman of the royal commission on National Museums and Galleries, which published its report in 1928. The bulk of their art collection was sold at auction in 1929. Two works once in their collection are in the National Gallery, three at the National Gallery of Art, Washington, and others at the (Mellon) Yale Center for British Art and other museums. The collection included 17th century Ottoman textiles.

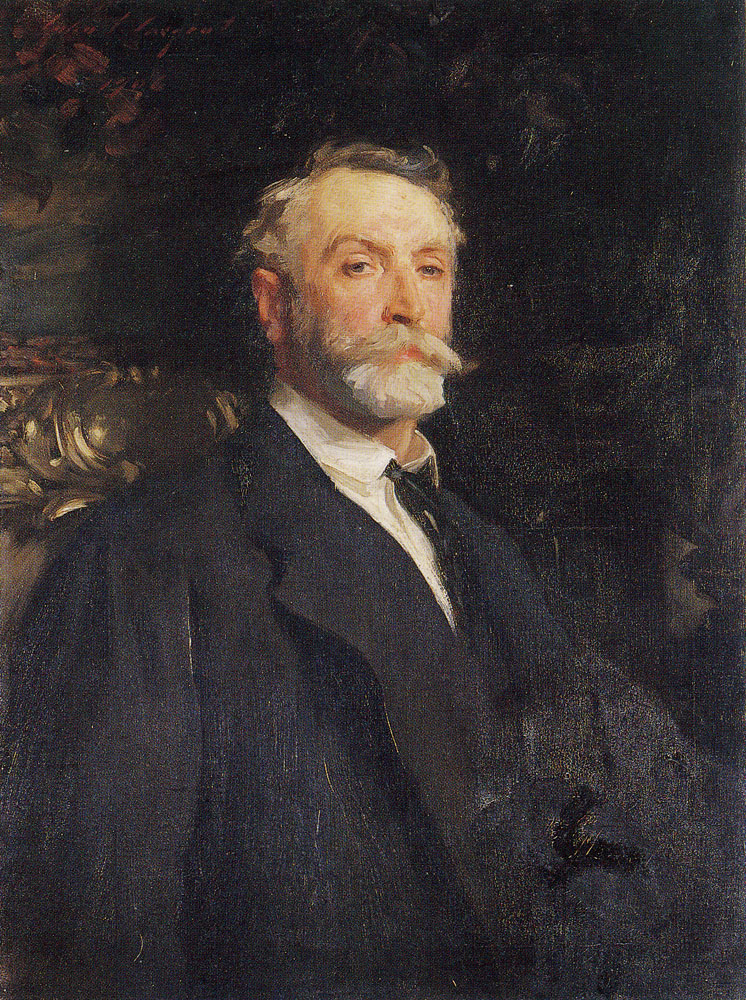
Portrait of Edgar Vincent, Viscount d’Abernon

D'Abernon died of hypostatic pneumonia and Parkinson's disease at Hove in November 1941. He had no children and the viscountcy and barony created for him therefore became extinct. There were no remaining heirs to the 1620 baronetcy and that too became extinct on his death.

=== Honours ===
D'Abernon was appointed Knight Commander of the Order of St Michael and St George (KCMG) in 1887, promoted to Knight Grand Cross (GCMG) in 1917, and made Knight Grand Cross of the Order of the Bath (GCB) in 1926. He joined the Privy Council in 1920.

D'Abernon was elevated to the peerage as Baron D'Abernon, of Esher in the county of Surrey, in 1914 and advanced to Viscount D'Abernon, of Esher and Stoke d'Abernon in the county of Surrey, in 1926. He was elected a Fellow of the Royal Society (FRS) in 1934.

D'Abernon succeeded his elder brother Sir Frederick D'Abernon Vincent, 15th Baronet of Stoke d'Abernon as 16th Baronet in 1936.

== Styles and honours ==
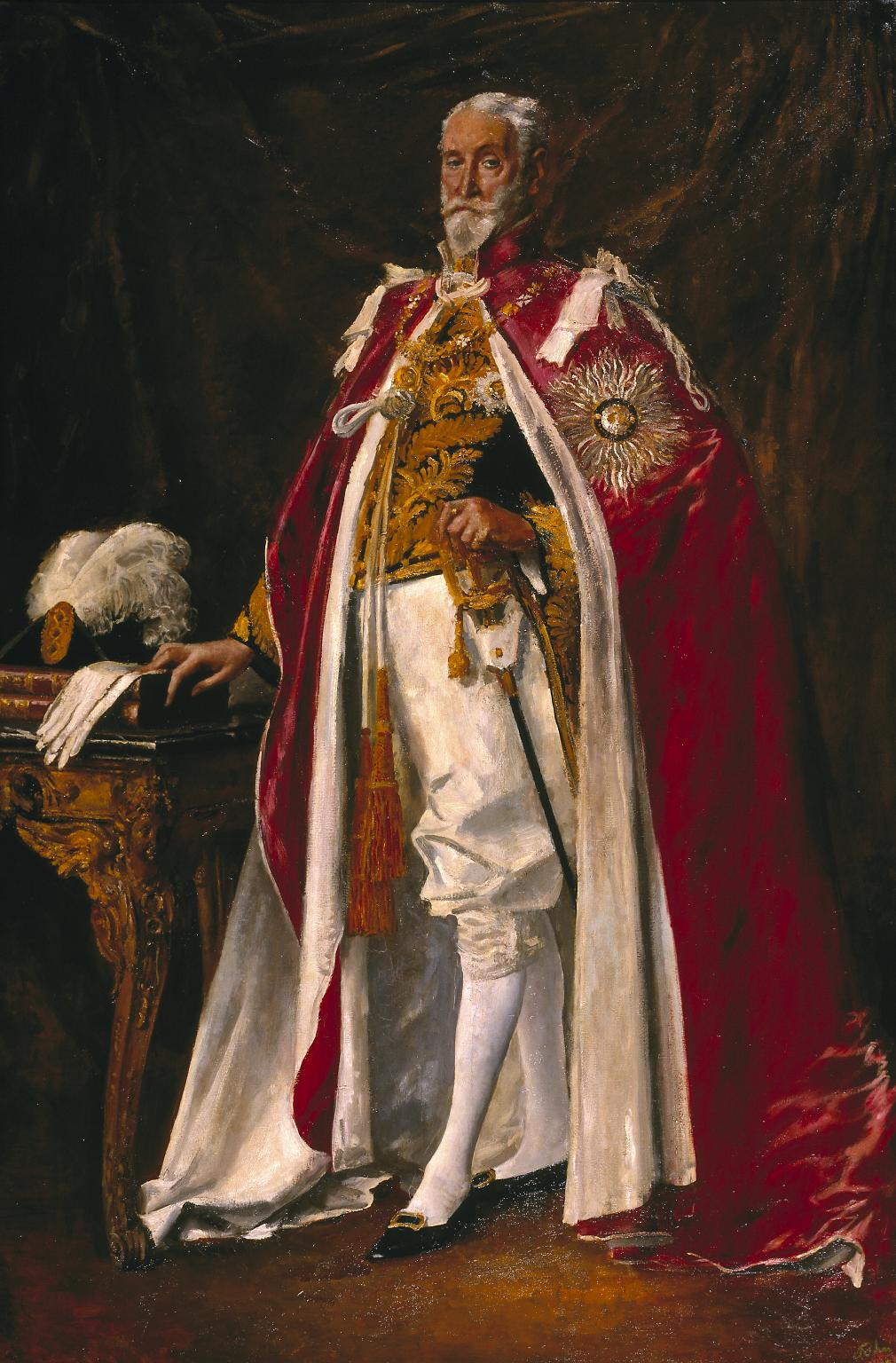
- Edgar Vincent, 1st Viscount D'Abernon
  Edgar Vincent (1857–1887)
- Sir Edgar Vincent KCMG (1887–1899)
- Sir Edgar Vincent KCMG MP (1899–1906)
- Sir Edgar Vincent KCMG (1906–1914)
- The Right Honourable The Lord D'Abernon KCMG (1914–1917)
- The Right Honourable The Lord D'Abernon GCMG (1917–1920)
- The Right Honourable The Lord D'Abernon GCMG PC (1920–1926)
- The Right Honourable The Viscount D'Abernon GCMG PC (1926)
- The Right Honourable The Viscount D'Abernon GCB GCMG PC (1926–1934)
- The Right Honourable The Viscount D'Abernon GCB GCMG PC FRS (1934–1941)

== Works ==
- A Grammar of Modern Greek (1881)
- Alcohol – Its Action on the Human Organism, His Majesty's Stationery Office, London, 1918
- An Ambassador of Peace, 3 volumes, Hodder and Stoughton, London, 1929–1931
- The Eighteenth Decisive Battle of the World: Warsaw, 1920, Hodder and Stoughton, London, 1931; reprinted by Hyperion Press, Westport, Conn., 1977, ISBN 0-88355-429-1

== Notes ==
Parliament of the United Kingdom
| Preceded by Henry Northcote | Member of Parliament for Exeter; 1899–1906 | Succeeded by Sir George Kekewich |
Peerage of the United Kingdom
| New creation | Viscount D'Abernon; 1926–1941 | Extinct |
| New creation | Baron D'Abernon; 1914–1941 | Extinct |
Baronetage of England
| Preceded by Frederick Vincent | Baronet (of Stoke d'Abernon); 1936–1941 | Extinct |
