= Arthur Onslow (disambiguation) =

Arthur Onslow (1691–1768) was Speaker of the British House of Commons.

Arthur Onslow may also refer to:

- Sir Arthur Onslow, 1st Baronet (1622–1688), English politician
- Arthur Onslow, 3rd Earl of Onslow (1777–1870), British peer
- Arthur Onslow (priest) (1746–1817), Dean of Worcester, 1795–1817
- Arthur Onslow (Australian politician) (1833–1882), New South Wales politician
