= Thomas Onslow =

Thomas Onslow may refer to:

- Thomas Onslow, 2nd Baron Onslow (1679–1740), British politician and landowner
- Thomas Onslow, 2nd Earl of Onslow (1754–1827), English nobleman and courtier
- Thomas Cranley Onslow (1778–1861), British politician and soldier
- Thomas Onslow (cricketer) (1821–1883), English cricketer, son of Thomas Cranley Onslow
