= Thomas Howard (British Army officer, born 1684) =

Lieutenant-General Thomas Howard (1684 – 31 March 1753) was an officer of the British Army and the ancestor of the family of the present Earls of Effingham.

== Biography ==
=== Background ===
He was the only surviving son of George Howard of Great Bookham, by his wife Ann, daughter of Thomas Kidder, of Lewes. George Howard was a younger son of Sir Charles Howard of Eastwick and a great-great-grandson of William Howard, 1st Baron Howard of Effingham through his second son Sir William Howard of Lingfield; George's elder brother Francis had succeeded as fifth Baron Howard of Effingham in 1681. Thomas Howard was baptised at Great Bookham on 13 August 1684. His father died on 13 December the same year and his mother on 16 September 1704; Howard would raise a memorial to his parents and their children Henry, Frances and Mary in Great Bookham Church on 26 November 1744.

=== Military career ===
Howard joined the Army as an ensign on 4 February 1703. During the War of the Spanish Succession he served in the Netherlands and Germany under the Duke of Marlborough, and in 1707 was present as a captain in Wade's Regiment of Foot at the Battle of Almanza, where he was taken prisoner. He was a prisoner of war in France for two years, but was promoted lieutenant-colonel of the 24th Regiment of Foot in 1708 and served at the Battle of Brihuega in 1710, where he was again captured. On 15 November 1711 he was granted brevet rank as a colonel of Foot. Howard was dismissed for his political opinions, but was reinstated by King George I, and in 1717 he purchased the colonelcy of the 24th Regiment of Foot, succeeding General Primrose.

Howard was promoted to brigadier-general in 1735. On 27 June 1737, following the death of Lieutenant-General Tatton, he was removed from the 24th Foot to the colonelcy of the Buffs – so called to distinguish them from the Green Howards, of which his kinsman Sir Charles Howard was colonel. He was promoted to major-general in 1739, and served as aide-de-camp to King George II for several years. In 1742 Howard went to Flanders to join the Pragmatic Army commanded by Lord Stair, and was appointed to the office of Governor of Berwick. On 1 February 1743 he was promoted to lieutenant-general, and served under George II that year at the Battle of Dettingen. He retired in 1749, and resigned his regiment to his son George, who was appointed colonel on 21 August. He remained Governor of Berwick until his death.

=== Marriage and descendants ===
On 28 February 1717, at St Bridget's, Dublin, Howard was married to Mary, the youngest daughter of William Moreton, bishop of Meath by his second wife Mary. By her he left children:

- Field Marshal Sir George Howard, KB (1718–16 July 1796). He married firstly Lady Lucy Wentworth, daughter of Thomas Wentworth, 1st Earl of Strafford, and secondly Elizabeth, daughter of Peter Beckford of Jamaica and widow of Thomas Howard, 2nd Earl of Effingham. By his second wife he had no children; by his first his only surviving child was a daughter,
  - Ann, married on 20 April 1780 to General Richard Vyse, and died 2 August 1784. Her son Richard William Howard Vyse was the field marshal's heir.
- Francis, died unmarried.
- Thomas, died unmarried.
- Henry Howard (14 January 1736 – 10 September 1811) of Tower House, Arundel. He married firstly Catherine, daughter of the Rev. John Carlton of Colchester. She died in December 1762, and on 6 November 1766 he married Maria (1745–29 January 1826), second daughter of Kenneth Mackenzie, Viscount Fortrose. By his first wife he had two daughters:
  - Catherine (1759–12 April 1830), who married the Rev. Robert Blayney of Pittsford.
  - Mary, who died unmarried on 16 December 1833.
  - Kenneth Alexander Howard (29 November 1767 – 13 February 1845), Henry Howard's son by his second wife, succeeded as 11th Baron Howard of Effingham on the death of Richard Howard, 4th Earl of Effingham in 1816, and was created Earl of Effingham in 1837. He is the ancestor of all subsequent earls.
- Henrietta Diana, died unmarried.
- Mary, married on 13 March 1746 to Sir Francis Vincent, 7th Baronet and died 16 August 1757.
- Catherine, married Field Marshal Studholme Hodgson.
- Sarah (born 31 May 1738).

Thomas Howard lived at 8 Savile Street (now Savile Row) from 1735, and died there on 31 March 1753. He was buried at Great Bookham on 6 April. His will was dated 14 November 1752 and was proved on 11 April 1753: in it he left the house in Savile Street and his property at Tettenhall Regis to his wife, and the rest of his estate to his eldest son George. His widow Mary Howard died on 5 February 1782.

Military offices
Preceded by Gilbert Primrose	Colonel of Howard's Regiment of Foot; 1717–1737	Succeeded by Thomas Wentworth
Preceded by William Tatton	Colonel of Howard's Regiment of Foot (The Buff Howards); 1737–1749	Succeeded by George Howard
Preceded by James Tyrrell	Governor of Berwick-upon-Tweed; 1742–1753	Succeeded by John Guise
