= Sir Henry Vincent, 6th Baronet =

British politician

Sir Henry Vincent, 6th Baronet (c. 1685 – 20 January 1757), of Stoke d'Abernon, Surrey, was a British politician who sat in the House of Commons from 1728 to 1734.

Vincent was the fourth, but eldest surviving son of Sir Francis Vincent, 5th Baronet, MP, and his wife Rebecca Ashe, daughter of Jonathan Ashe, merchant of London. He matriculated at Corpus Christi College, Oxford on 11 October 1703, aged 18. He married Elizabeth Sherman, daughter of Bazaliel Sherman, a Turkey merchant of London.

Vincent was distantly related to the Onslows, who brought him in as Member of Parliament for Guildford at a by-election on 21 February 1728. He voted consistently with the Administration, but was not put up again at the 1734 British general election. At the 1741 British general election, he stood for Surrey, asking Walpole to recommend him to several influential persons in thecounty, but he gave up before the poll.

Vincent succeeded his father in the baronetcy on 10 February 1736. He died on 20 January 1757, having had two sons and five daughters including:

- Sir Francis Vincent, 7th Baronet
- Thomas Vincent, who died in 1740.
- Elizabeth Vincent, died unmarried
- Hester Vincent who married John Smith de Burgh, 11th Earl of Clanricarde and died on 29 December 1804
- Sarah Vincent

Parliament of Great Britain
Preceded by Arthur Onslow; Colonel Richard Onslow	Member of Parliament for Guildford; 1728–1734; With: Colonel Richard Onslow	Succeeded by Hon. Richard Onslow; Colonel Richard Onslow
Baronetage of England
Preceded by Francis Vincent	Baronet (of Stoke d'Abernon, Surrey); 1736 – 1757	Succeeded by Francis Vincent
