= Viscount D'Abernon =

Title in the Peerage of the United Kingdom

Arms of Vincent: Azure, three quatrefoils argent

Viscount D'Abernon, of Esher and of Stoke d'Abernon in the County of Surrey, was a title in the Peerage of the United Kingdom. It was created on 20 February 1926 for the politician, diplomat and writer Edgar Vincent, 1st Baron D'Abernon who had been created Baron D'Abernon, of Esher in the County of Surrey, on 2 July 1914. In 1936 he succeeded his elder brother as sixteenth Baronet, of Stoke d'Abernon. All three titles became extinct on his death in 1941.

The Vincent Baronetcy, of Stoke d'Abernon in the County of Surrey, was created in the Baronetage of England on 26 July 1620 for Francis Vincent.

== Election of six of the baronets as MP ==
The first Baronet was elected after receipt of his title to represent Surrey in the House of Commons. The third Baronet sat as Member of Parliament (MP) for Dover, the fifth and seventh Baronets for Surrey, the sixth Baronet for Guildford and the tenth Baronet for St Albans.

== Vincent Baronets, of Stoke d'Abernon (1620) ==
- Sir Francis Vincent, 1st Baronet (c. 1568–1640)
- Sir Anthony Vincent, 2nd Baronet (1594–1642)
- Sir Francis Vincent, 3rd Baronet (c. 1621–1670)
- Sir Anthony Vincent, 4th Baronet (c. 1645–1674)
- Sir Francis Vincent, 5th Baronet (1646–1736)
- Sir Henry Vincent, 6th Baronet (c. 1685–1757)
- Sir Francis Vincent, 7th Baronet (c. 1717–1775)
- Sir Francis Vincent, 8th Baronet (1747–1791)
- Sir Francis Vincent, 9th Baronet (1780–1809)
- Sir Francis Vincent, 10th Baronet (1803–1880)
- Sir Frederick Vincent, 11th Baronet (1798–1883)
- Sir William Vincent, 12th Baronet (1834–1914)
- Sir Francis Erskine Vincent, 13th Baronet (1869–1935)
- Sir Anthony Francis Vincent, 14th Baronet (1894–1936)
- Sir Frederick d'Abernon Vincent, 15th Baronet (1852–1936)
- Sir Edgar Vincent, 16th Baronet (1857–1941) (see below, created in 1926 Viscount D'Abernon)

== Baron D'Abernon (1914) ==
Edgar Vincent, 1st Baron D'Abernon (see below, created in 1926 Viscount D'Abernon)

== Viscount D'Abernon (1926) ==
- Edgar Vincent, 1st Viscount D'Abernon (1857–1941)
