= George Onslow, 1st Earl of Onslow =

British peer and politician

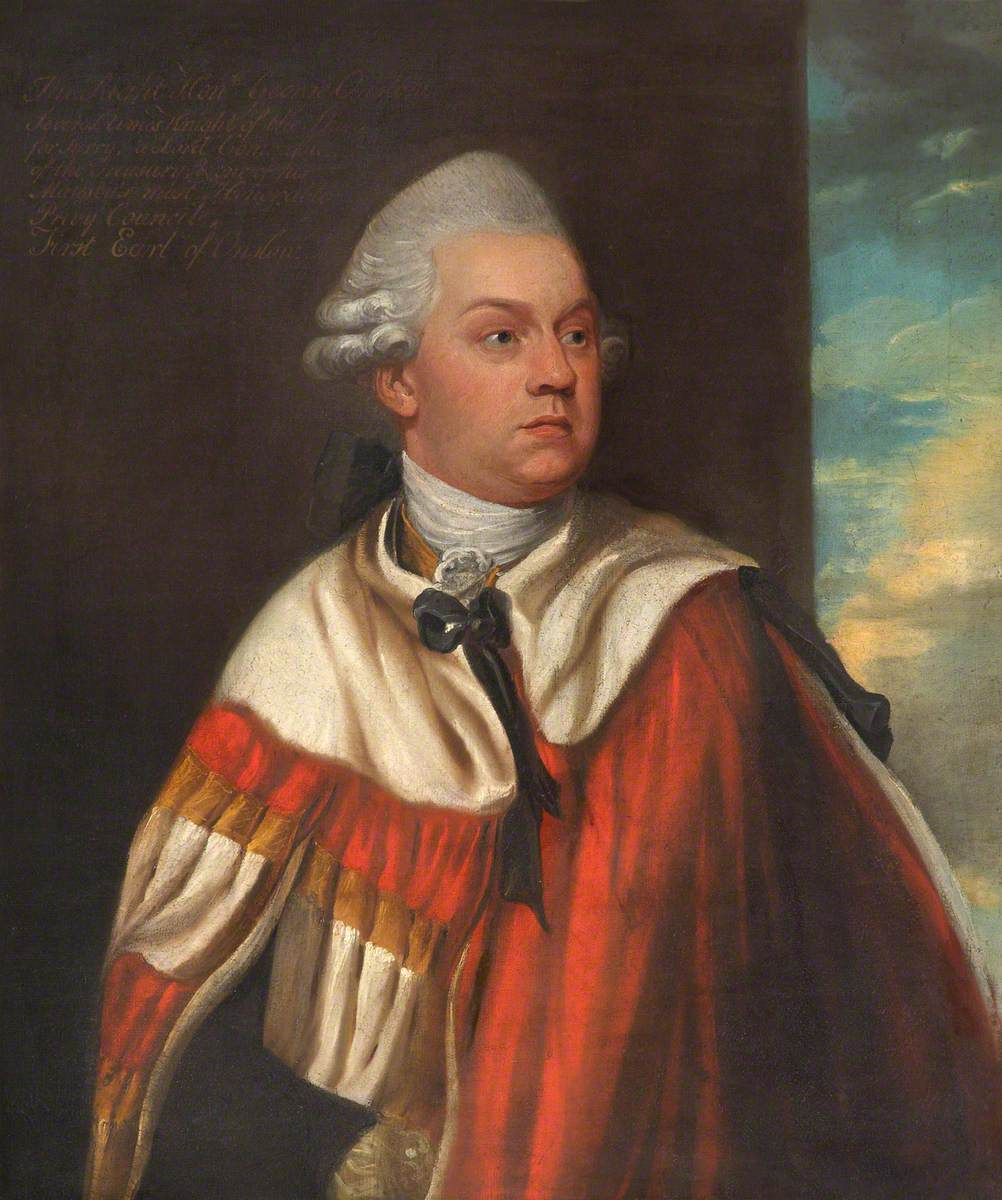
George Onslow, 4th Baron Onslow, later 1st Earl of Onslow, ca 1776, oil on canvas

George Onslow, 1st Earl of Onslow PC (13 September 1731 – 17 May 1814), known as Lord Onslow from 1776 until 1801, was a British peer and politician.

== Background ==
He was the only son of Arthur Onslow, having no brothers but one sister, who died in 1751. Following in the footsteps of his father, he was admitted to the Middle Temple on 14 November 1739, but was not Called to the Bar.

== Career ==
Onslow sat as Member of Parliament for Rye from 1754 to 1761 and for Surrey from 1761 to 1774.

On 3 March 1759 he was commissioned as lieutenant-colonel of the Surrey Militia which his kinsman Richard Onslow, 3rd Baron Onslow, had raised and briefly commanded as Lord Lieutenant of Surrey. On 3 November that year, the regiment was divided into two battalions and George Onslow was promoted to colonel and given command of the 2nd or Western Battalion, with the writer Francis Grose as his adjutant. The militia was disembodied in December 1762 at the end of the Seven Years' War and the two Surrey battalions amalgamated on 26 February 1763, when Onslow was made colonel of the combined regiment. He resigned the command on 20 October 1765 after he became a government minister. Later, when he was himself Lord Lieutenant of Surrey, his eldest son commanded the 2nd Royal Surrey Militia.

From 1765 to 1777, he was a junior Lord of the Treasury. He then became successively Comptroller of the Household and Treasurer of the Household. On 20 May 1776, he was created Baron Cranley, of Imber Court in the County of Surrey. On 8 October 1776, he also succeeded his second cousin Richard Onslow, 3rd Baron Onslow, as Baron Onslow. He was further honoured on 17 June 1801 when he was created Viscount Cranley, of Cranley in the County of Surrey, and Earl of Onslow, of Onslow in the County of Shropshire.

== Family ==
Lord Onslow married Henrietta Shelley (d. May 1802), daughter of Sir John Shelley, 4th Baronet and his second wife Margaret Pelham, on 26 June 1753. They had four sons and one daughter:

- Thomas Onslow, 2nd Earl of Onslow (15 March 1754 – 22 February 1827)
- John Onslow (21 November 1755 – 4 February 1757)
- Henry Onslow (9 February 1757 – 25 July 1757)
- Edward Onslow (9 April 1758 – 18 October 1829), married on 6 March 1783 Marie Rosalie de Bourdeille and had issue.
- Henrietta Onslow (b. 18 March 1760, died in infancy)

In 1778, Lord Onslow sold Imber Court in Thames Ditton, and a large estate including farms and gardens, and the Imber Court Copper Mills.

The Earl died on 17 May 1814 aged 82 and was succeeded by his eldest son.

== Notes ==
Parliament of Great Britain
Preceded by Phillips Gybbon; Thomas Pelham	Member of Parliament for Rye; 1754–1761; With: Phillips Gybbon	Succeeded by Phillips Gybbon; John Albert Bentinck
Preceded by Arthur Onslow; Thomas Budgen	Member of Parliament for Surrey; 1761–1774; With: Sir Francis Vincent, Bt	Succeeded by Sir Francis Vincent, Bt; James Scawen
Political offices
Preceded by The Lord King	Out-Ranger of Windsor Forest; 1754–1763	Succeeded by Lord Charles Spencer
Preceded by Thomas Hervey	Surveyor of Gardens and Waters; 1761–1763	Succeeded by Lord Charles Spencer
Preceded by Sir William Meredith, Bt	Comptroller of the Household; 1777–1779	Succeeded by Sir Richard Worsley, Bt
Preceded by The Earl of Carlisle	Treasurer of the Household; 1779–1780	Succeeded by The Earl of Salisbury
Honorary titles
Preceded by The Lord Onslow	Lord Lieutenant of Surrey; 1776–1814	Succeeded by The Viscount Midleton
Peerage of the United Kingdom
New creation	Earl of Onslow; 1801–1814	Succeeded by Thomas Onslow
New creation	Viscount Cranley; 1801–1814	Succeeded by Thomas Onslow
Peerage of Great Britain
Preceded by Richard Onslow	Baron Onslow; 1776–1814	Succeeded by Thomas Onslow
New creation	Baron Cranley; 1776–1814	Succeeded by Thomas Onslow
