= List of governors of Berwick-upon-Tweed =

Below is a list of those who have held the office of Governor of Berwick-upon-Tweed, including the garrison at Holy Island (during English occupation of the Royal Burgh):

== Governors of Berwick-upon-Tweed ==
=== For Scotland ===
- 1295–1296 Sir William Douglas
- 1328–1333 Sir Alexander de Seton, Lord of Seton & Winchburgh
- 1333 Sir William Keith
- 1333 Patrick de Dunbar

=== For England ===
- 1302: Edmund Hasting
- 1440–?: Henry Percy, 2nd Earl of Northumberland

=== For Scotland ===
- 1461 Sir Robert Lauder
- 1473–1476: David Lindsay, Earl of Crawford
- 1478: Sir Robert Lauder (again)
- 1482: Patrick Hepburn, 1st Lord Hailes

=== For England ===
- 1484–?: Henry Percy, 3rd Earl of Northumberland
- ?–1539: Sir Thomas Clifford
- 1539–?: William Eure, 1st Baron Eure (died 1548)
- 1553–?: John Conyers, 3rd Baron Conyers (died 1557)
- 1559–1562: William Grey, 13th Baron Grey de Wilton
- 1564–1568: Francis Russell, 2nd Earl of Bedford
- 1568–1596: Henry Carey, 1st Baron Hunsdon
- 1596–1598: John Carey, 3rd Baron Hunsdon
- 1598–1601: Peregrine Bertie, 13th Baron Willoughby de Eresby
- 1601–1603: John Carey, 3rd Baron Hunsdon (2nd term)
- c.1610: Sir James Dundas of Arniston
- 1639–?: Robert Bertie, 1st Earl of Lindsey
- 1649–: Colonel George Fenwick
- 1660–1675: William Widdrington, 2nd Baron Widdrington
- 1675–1686: Henry Cavendish, 2nd Duke of Newcastle-upon-Tyne
- 1686–1688: William Widdrington, 3rd Baron Widdrington
- 1689–1690: Philip Babington
- 1691–1699: Richard Leveson (died 1699)
- 1702–1707: Edmund Maine

=== For Great Britain (post 1707 Act of Union) ===
- 1707–1711: Edmund Maine
- 1713–1715: Sir Henry Belasyse
- 1715–1718: Charles Wills
- 1718–1719: George MacCartney
- 1719–1732: Joseph Sabine
- 1732–1733: George Wade
- 1733–1735: Rich Russell
- 1735–1740: Philip Honywood
- 1740–1741: Thomas Whetham
- 1742: James Tyrrell
- 1742–1753: Thomas Howard
- 1753–1765: John Guise
- 1765–1778: Robert Monckton
- 1778: Sir John Clavering (in fact Clavering had died in the East Indies the previous year)
- 1778–1780: Sir John Mordaunt
- 1780–1795: John Vaughan
- 1795–1808: William Howe, later Viscount Howe
- 1808–1833: Banastre Tarleton
- 1833–1850: Sir James Bathurst

== Lieutenant-Governors ==
- 1702–1705: Edward Nott
- 1705: William Dobyns
- ?–1733: Rich Russell
- 1733–1737: James St. Clair
- 1737–1747: John Price
- 1749–1764: John Barrington
- 1765–1767: Roderick Gwynne
- 1767–1793: William Hill
- 1793–1794: Gerard Lake
- 1794–1795: Edmund Stevens
- 1795–?1842: George Ludlow
