= Elwill baronets =

Escutcheon of the Elwill baronets

The Elwill Baronetcy, of Exeter in the County of Devon, was a title in the Baronetage of Great Britain. It was created on 25 August 1709 for John Elwill, Member of Parliament for Bere Alston.

The 4th Baronet sat as Member of Parliament for Guildford. The title became extinct on his death in 1778.

== Elwill baronets, of Exeter (1709) ==
- Sir John Elwill, 1st Baronet (c. 1640 – 1717)
- Sir John Elwill, 2nd Baronet (died 1727)
- Sir Edmund Elwill, 3rd Baronet (died 1740)
- Sir John Elwill, 4th Baronet (died 1778)

Baronetage of Great Britain
Preceded by Abercrombie baronets	Elwill baronets of Exeter; 25 August 1709	Succeeded by Thorold baronets
