= Arthur Onslow =

British politician (1691–1768)

The Right Honourable Arthur Onslow
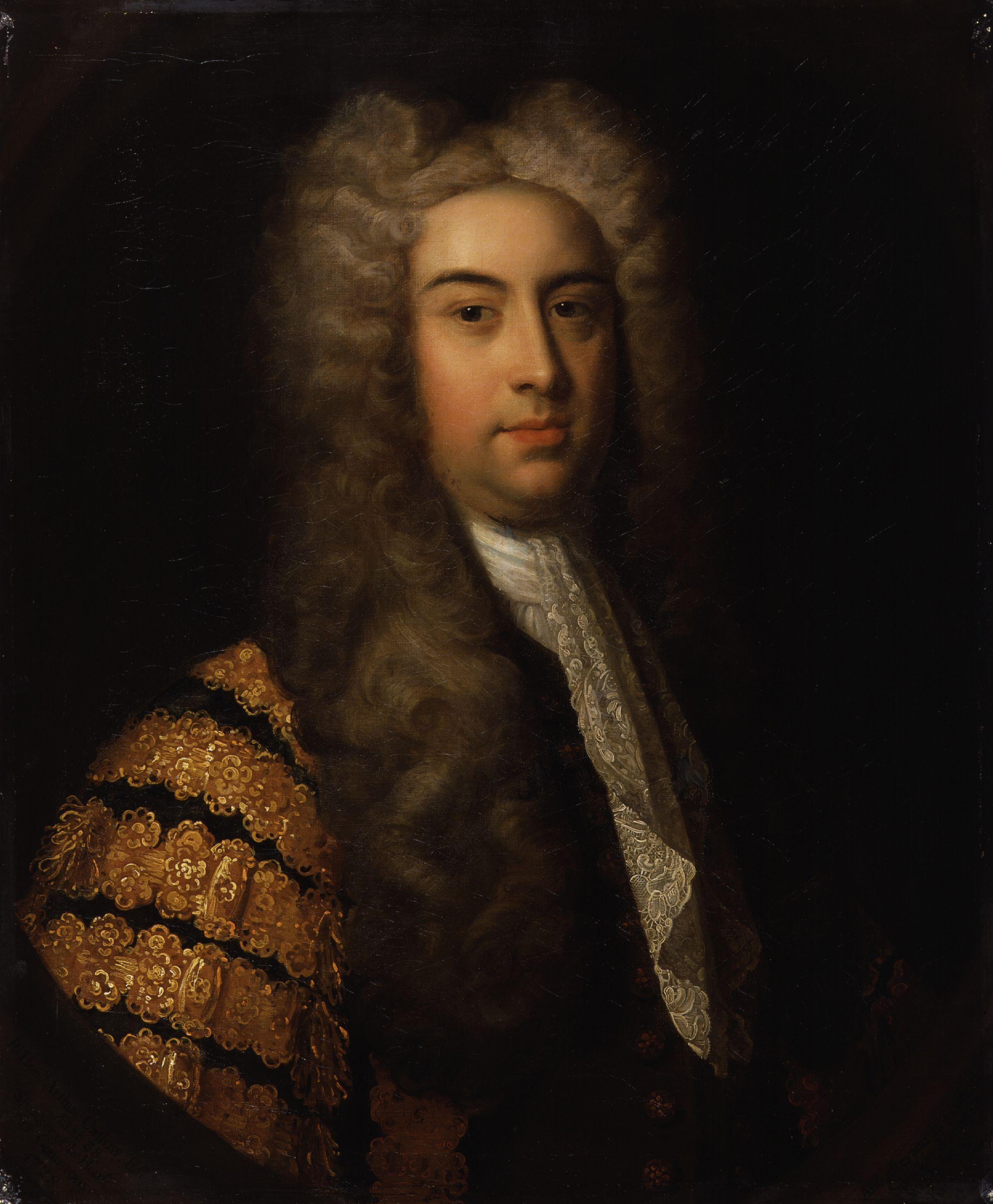
- Portrait by Hans Hysing, 1728

Speaker of the House of Commons of Great Britain
- In office 23 January 1728 – 18 March 1761
- Monarchs: George II; George III
- Prime Minister: Sir Robert Walpole; The Earl of Wilmington; Henry Pelham; The Duke of Newcastle; The Duke of Devonshire; The Duke of Newcastle
- Preceded by: Sir Spencer Compton
- Succeeded by: Sir John Cust

Personal details
- Born: 1 October 1691
- Died: 17 February 1768 (aged 76)
- Party: Whig
- Spouse: Anne Bridges (m. 1720; died 1763)
- Children: 2, including George

Arthur Onslow (1 October 1691 – 17 February 1768) was a British Whig politician. He set a record for length of service when repeatedly elected to serve as speaker of the House of Commons, where he was known for his integrity.

== Early life and education ==
Onslow was born in Kensington, the elder son of Foot Onslow (died 1710) and his wife Susannah née Anlaby. He was educated at The Royal Grammar School, Guildford, and Winchester College and matriculated at Wadham College, Oxford, in 1708, although he took no degree. He was called to the bar at the Middle Temple in 1713, but had no great practice in law.

== Career ==
When George I came to the throne, Onslow's uncle Sir Richard Onslow was appointed Chancellor of the Exchequer. Arthur became his private secretary. When Richard left office in 1715, Arthur obtained a place as receiver general of the Post Office. He became Recorder of Guildford in 1719. As his Post Office position was not compatible with a parliamentary seat, he passed it on to his younger brother Richard when he entered Parliament in 1720 for Guildford.

== Marriage and family ==
On 8 October 1720, Onslow married Anne Bridges (1703–1763), daughter of John Bridges of Thames Ditton, Surrey, and the niece and coheir of Henry Bridges of Imber Court. After his father-in-law died in the mid-1720s, Onslow came into the entire estate, which had increased through the addition of the holding of Ann's sister, Rose, who had recently died. (She had married his younger brother Richard, whose life interest in her estate Arthur purchased after her death.) Inheriting estates from his wife's family considerably improved Onslow's financial position. Onslow made Imber Court in Thames Ditton his principal seat. Onslow and Anne had two children:

- George Onslow, 1st Earl of Onslow (1731–1814)
- Anne Onslow (c. 15 November 1744 – 20 December 1751)

== Politics ==
In February 1720, Onslow had been returned as Whig Member of Parliament for Guildford at a by-election. He represented that borough until Parliament was dissolved in 1727. During this period, he was known to have declared against a proposal to levy Roman Catholics in 1722, and opposed the motion to reverse Bolingbroke's attainder in 1725. In 1726, he was one of the Commons managers for the trial of Macclesfield for corruption.

In 1727, he was returned both for Guildford and Surrey, with the highest majority ever recorded, and elected to serve for Surrey; his younger brother Richard Onslow replaced him at Guildford in a by-election.

On 23 January 1728, Onslow was unanimously elected Speaker of the House of Commons, a post which had been held by his uncle Sir Richard Onslow, Bt, and his ancestor Richard Onslow. He would be unanimously re-elected Speaker in 1735, 1741, 1747 and 1754, setting a record for length of service in that office: 33 years. On 25 July 1728, he was sworn of the Privy Council, and was also made a bencher of the Middle Temple that year. The following year, on 13 May 1729, he was made Chancellor and Keeper of the Great Seal to Queen Caroline, who was godmother to his son George in 1731.

In October 1731 the Cotton Library caught fire. Onslow's intervention on the night, throwing books out of the windows into the courtyard below, and subsequent oversight of their repair and preservation, saved many valuable books and manuscripts for the nation.

Onslow's speakership was distinguished by his great integrity in a corrupt and jobbing age. His great achievement as Speaker was to assert the independence, authority, and impartiality of that post. While he continued to participate in ordinary political activity, speaking and voting in committee, he did not hesitate to oppose Government policy when necessary. Onslow saw his role to be the protection and defence of Parliament in the tradition established by the Glorious Revolution. He insisted on rigidly observing parliamentary forms and procedure, which he viewed as a protection to independent MPs. But his devotion to precedent led him to condemn the reporting of parliamentary debates as breach of privilege.

On 20 April 1734, Onslow received the valuable office of Treasurer of the Navy. In 1742, after casting his vote on a highly political issue, he resigned the post to confute claims of political influence. He continued to receive emoluments from the office of Speaker, such as those for private bills. He also became Recorder of Guildford and high steward of Kingston upon Thames in 1737. During the 1730s, he was involved in the effort that led to the charter of the Foundling Hospital and was one of its founding governors. In 1753 he was instrumental in persuading Parliament to fund the purchase of Hans Sloane's collection and the Harleian Library, which together with the Cotton Library established the British Museum.

Due to failing health, he retired from Parliament in 1761, doing so with the unanimous thanks of the House of Commons. He received an annuity of £3000 from the King for his life and that of his son, the first occasion upon which a retiring Speaker was pensioned.

== Legacy and honours ==
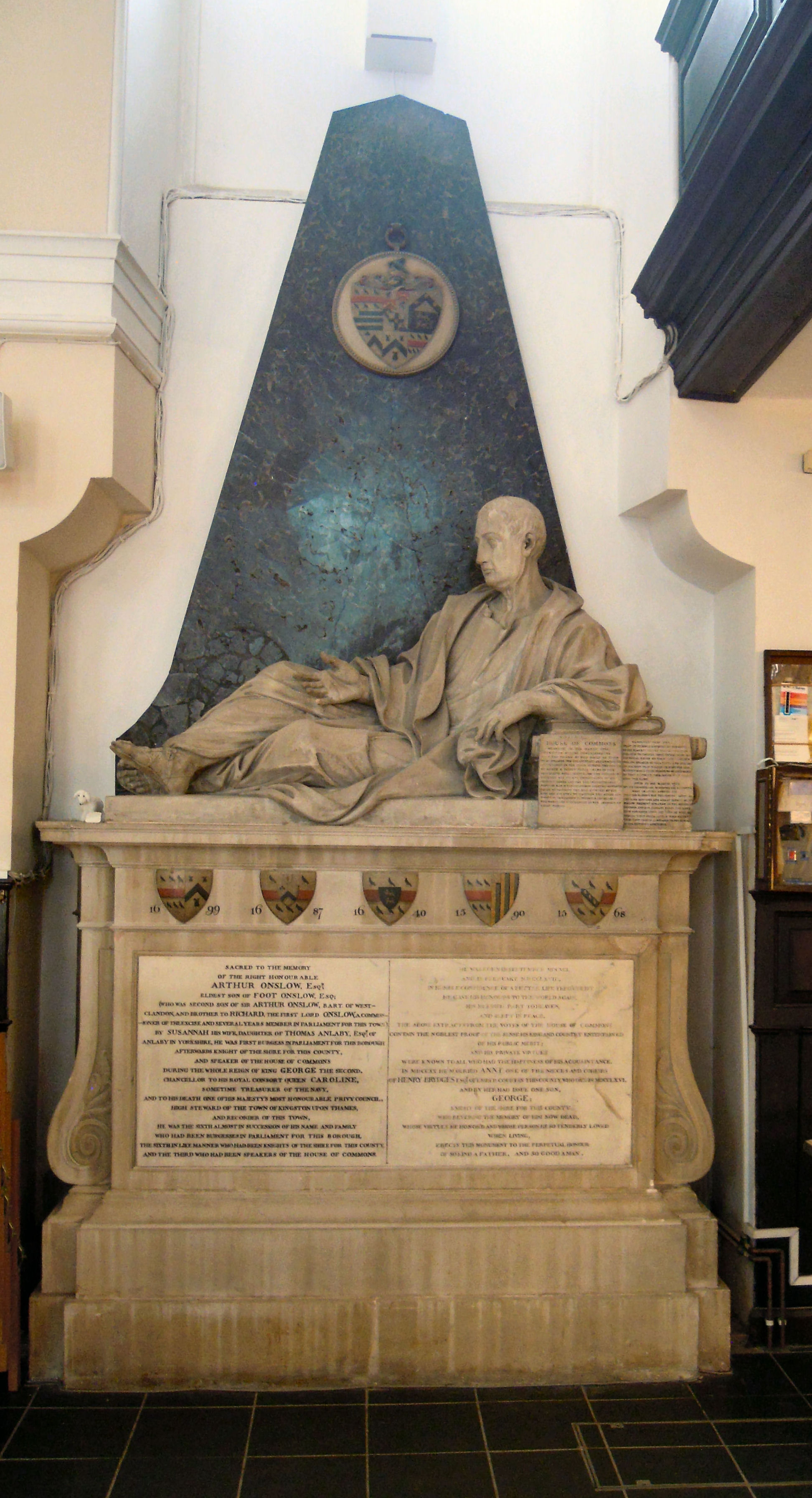
Onslow's memorial in Holy Trinity Church in Guildford

- Onslow was awarded the Freedom of the City of London.
- He was voted a trustee of the British Museum.
- Onslow County, North Carolina, was named in his honour.

He died at his home in London in 1768 and was buried at Thames Ditton, but his body and that of his wife were later removed to the Onslow burial place in Merrow Church, Surrey.

Horace Walpole at one point said of him that he was "too pompous to be loved, though too ridiculous to be hated", but subsequently wrote in more considered fashion:

No man had ever supported with more firmness the privileges of the House, nor sustained the dignity of his office with more authority. His knowledge of the constitution equalled his attachment to it. To the Crown he behaved with all the decorum of respect, without sacrificing his freedom of speech. Against the encroachments of the house of peers he was an inflexible champion. His disinterested virtue supported him through all his pretensions; and though to conciliate popular favour he affected an impartiality that by turns led him to the borders of insincerity and contradiction; and though he was often so minutely attached to forms, that it made him troublesome in affairs of higher moment, it will be difficult to find a subject, whom gravity will so well become, whose knowledge will be so useful and so accurate, and whose fidelity to his trust will prove so unshaken.

== Descendants ==
Speaker Onslow's nephew, George Onslow (1731–1792), a son of his brother Richard, was a lieutenant colonel and Member of Parliament for Guildford from 1760 to 1784. George had a younger brother Richard (1741–1817), who entered the Royal Navy and was promoted Admiral in 1799.

One of his descendants, Cranley Onslow, was a member of parliament in the late 20th century.

== Arthur Onslow in Thames Ditton ==
Onslow gained much by his marriage to Ann. Onslow made Imber Court in Thames Ditton his principal seat. Early in his career, Onslow became High Steward of Kingston upon Thames. When he died in 1768 at the age of 76, he was buried at St Nicholas Church, Thames Ditton but subsequently his body, and that of his wife Ann, were moved to the Onslow burial site at Merrow Church, near Clandon.

== Bibliography ==
- Philip J Burchett (1984). A Historical Sketch of THAMES DITTON. Surrey: Thames Ditton and Weston Green Residents' Association. ISBN 0-904811-20-4.
- Laundy, Philip (2004). "Onslow, Arthur (1691–1768)". Oxford Dictionary of National Biography. Oxford Dictionary of National Biography (online ed.). Oxford University Press. doi:10.1093/ref:odnb/20788. (Subscription, Wikipedia Library access or UK public library membership required.)

Political offices
Preceded by Sir Spencer Compton	Speaker of the House of Commons of Great Britain; 1728–1761	Succeeded by Sir John Cust
Preceded by The Viscount Torrington	Treasurer of the Navy; 1734–1742	Succeeded by Thomas Clutterbuck
Parliament of Great Britain
Preceded by Morgan Randyll; Robert Wroth	Member of Parliament for Guildford; 1720–1728; With: Morgan Randyll 1720–1722; Thomas Brodrick 1722–1727; Richard Onslow 1727–1728	Succeeded by Richard Onslow; Henry Vincent
Preceded by John Walter; Thomas Scawen	Member of Parliament for Surrey; 1727–1761; With: Thomas Scawen 1727–1741; The Lord Baltimore 1741–1751; Thomas Budgen 1751–1761	Succeeded by George Onslow; Sir Francis Vincent, Bt
