= 1761 British general election =

Election in Great Britain

- 25 March – 5 May 1761

All 558 seats in the House of Commons 280 seats needed for a majority
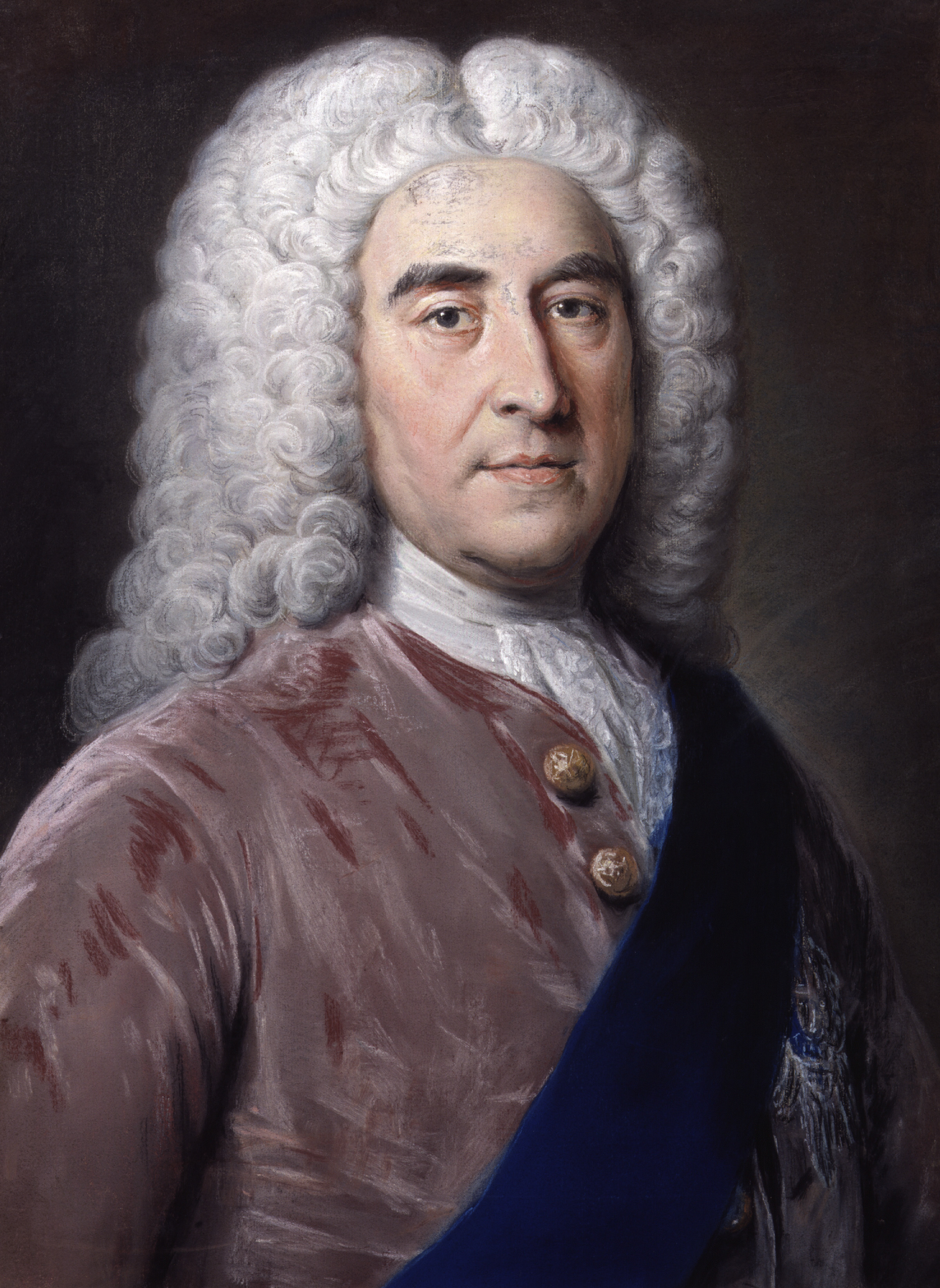
	First party	Second party
		Tory
Leader	Duke of Newcastle	—
Party	Whig	Tory
Leader's seat	House of Lords	—
Seats won	446	112
Seat change	▲78	▲6
- Composition of the House of Commons after the election
Prime Minister before election
Duke of Newcastle
Whig
Prime Minister after election
Duke of Newcastle
Whig

The 1761 British general election returned members to serve in the House of Commons of the 12th Parliament of Great Britain to be summoned, after the merger of the Parliament of England and the Parliament of Scotland in 1707. This was the first Parliament chosen after the accession to the throne of King George III. It was also the first election after George III had lifted the conventional proscription on the employment of Tories in government. The King prevented the Prime Minister, the Duke of Newcastle, from using public money to fund the election of Whig candidates, but Newcastle instead simply used his private fortune to ensure that his ministry gained a comfortable majority.

However, with the Tories disintegrating, as a result of the end of their proscription providing them with new opportunities for personal advancement, and the loyalty they felt to the new king causing them to drift apart, there was little incentive for Newcastle's supporters to stay together. What little survived of Whig ideology was not compelling enough to maintain the party's coherence, and they split into a number of feuding factions led by aristocratic magnates, contributing to the political instability that would last until 1770.

With only 48 constituencies contested, the election was one of the least contested in British history. This was the last time until 1832 that the Tories secured less than 200 seats.

== Summary of the constituencies ==
The constituencies used were the same throughout the existence of the Parliament of Great Britain.

Monmouthshire (One County constituency with two members and one single member Borough constituency) is included in Wales in these tables. Sources for this period may include the county in England.

Table 1: Constituencies and Members, by type and country

Country	BC	CC	UC	Total C	BMP	CMP	UMP	Total Members
England	202	39	2	243	404	78	4	486
Wales	13	13	0	26	13	14	0	27
Scotland	15	30	0	45	15	30	0	45
Total	230	82	2	314	432	122	4	558

Table 2: Number of seats per constituency, by type and country

Country	BC×1	BC×2	BC×4	CC×1	CC×2	UC×2	Total C
England	4	196	2	0	39	2	243
Wales	13	0	0	12	1	0	26
Scotland	15	0	0	30	0	0	45
Total	32	196	2	42	40	2	314

== Dates of election ==
The general election was held between 25 March 1761 and 5 May 1761.

At this period elections did not take place at the same time in every constituency. The returning officer in each county or parliamentary borough fixed the precise date (see hustings for details of the conduct of the elections).

== Results ==

=== Seats summary ===
Parliamentary seats
Whig	79.9%
Tory	20.1%

== Perception of corruption ==
On the eve of the general election Horace Walpole wrote to Horace Mann:

Whatever mysteries or clouds there are, will probably develop themselves as soon as the elections are over, and the Parliament fixed, which now engrosses all conversation and all purses; for the expense is incredible. West Indians, conquerors, nabobs, and admirals, attack every borough; there are no fewer than nine candidates at Andover. The change in a Parliament used to be computed at between sixty and seventy; now it is believed there will be an hundred and fifty new members. Corruption now stands upon its own legs no money is issued from the Treasury; there are no parties, no pretence of grievances, and yet venality is grosser than ever! The borough of Sudbury has gone so far as to advertise for a chapman ! We have been as victorious as the Romans, and are as corrupt : I don't know how soon the Praetorian militia will set the empire to sale.

This had been used in a number of history books. The historian Lewis Namier refuted this in an essay on the 1761 General Election. His argument was that the number of new MPs in 1747 and 1754 were about the same as 1761, that the 48 contested constituencies out of 315 in total was smaller than 1754, the price of seats - although higher than 1754 - was explained by the higher chance of a full seven tear term and that the numbers of admirals fell while the other "new men" rose only slightly.

== See also ==
- List of parliaments of Great Britain
- List of MPs elected in the 1761 British general election
