= Sir John Elwill, 4th Baronet =

English aristocrat and politician

Sir John Elwill, 4th Baronet (died 1 March 1778) was an English aristocrat and politician.

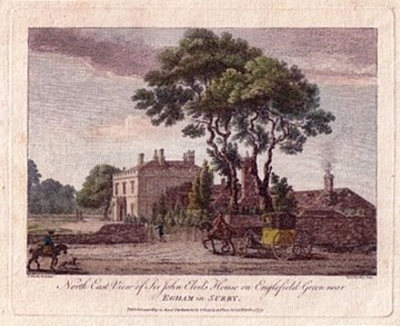
Elvills at Englefield Green, 1775

He was the only son of Sir Edmund Elwill, 3rd Baronet, and his wife Anne Speke, daughter of William Speke, of Beauchamp, Somerset. The third baronet was Comptroller of the Excise; he inherited the baronetcy from his childless elder brother Sir John Elwill, 2nd Baronet, on the latter's death on 10 September 1727.

The fourth baronet inherited the Elwill baronetcy on his father's death on 2 February 1740. He was elected Member of Parliament in the Parliament of Great Britain for Guildford in the 1747 British general election and held the seat over three parliaments until 1768.

He married Selina, Lady Ranelagh, on 30 November 1755 at West Dean. She was the widow of Arthur Cole, 1st Baron Ranelagh, and the daughter of Peter Bathurst, of Clarendon Park, Wiltshire. Her mother, Bathurst's second wife Lady Selina Shirley, was the daughter of Robert Shirley, 1st Earl Ferrers. He built a mansion called "Elvills", now known as Castle Hill, in Englefield Green, Egham, Surrey between 1758 and 1763. It was designed by Stiff Leadbetter.

Sir John Elwill, 4th Baronet, died without male issue on 1 March 1778, and was interred at Egham, Surrey. The baronetcy became extinct. His widow died, aged 60, on 9 February 1781, at West Dean, and was buried there 9 days later.

Baronetage of Great Britain
Preceded by Edmund Elwill	Baronet (of Exeter); 1740–1778	Extinct
