= List of battalions of the Queen's Royal Regiment (West Surrey) =

This is a list of battalions of the Queen's Royal Regiment (West Surrey), which existed as an infantry regiment of the British Army from 1661 to 1959.

== Original composition ==
When the 2nd (The Queen's Royal) Regiment of Foot became The Queen's (Royal West Surrey) Regiment in 1881 under the Cardwell-Childers reforms of the British Armed Forces, it became the county regiment of West Surrey. An existing militia Regiment and four volunteer battalions of West Surrey were integrated into the structure of the Queen's Royal Regiment. Volunteer battalions had been created in reaction to a perceived threat of invasion by France in the late 1850s. Organised as "rifle volunteer corps", they were independent of the British Army and composed primarily of the middle class.

Battalion	Formed	Formerly
Regular
1st	1661	
2nd	1663	
Militia
3rd (Militia)	1797	2nd Royal Surrey Militia
Volunteers
1st Volunteer	Croydon, 1859	2nd Surrey Rifle Volunteer Corps
2nd Volunteer	Dorking, 1859	4th Surrey Rifle Volunteer Corps
3rd Volunteer	Bermondsey, 1860	6th Surrey Rifle Volunteer Corps
4th Volunteer	Southwark, 1859	8th Surrey Rifle Volunteer Corps

== Reorganisation ==
The Territorial Force (later Territorial Army) was formed in 1908, which the volunteer battalions joined, while the militia battalions transferred to the "Special Reserve". All volunteer battalions were renumbered to create a single sequential order.

Battalion	Formerly
4th	1st Volunteer Battalion
5th	2nd Volunteer Battalion

== First World War ==
The Queen's Royal Regiment fielded 28 battalions during the course of the war. The regiment's two territorial battalions formed duplicate second, third and fourth line battalions. As an example, the three-line battalions of the 4th King's were numbered as the 1/4th, 2/4th, 3/4th, and 4/4th respectively. Many battalions of the Queen's Royals were formed as part of Secretary of State for War Lord Kitchener's appeal for an initial 100,000 men volunteers in 1914. They were referred to as the New Army or Kitchener's Army. The 10th to 12th Queen's Royals, New Army "Service" battalions, were referred to as "Pals" because they were predominantly composed of colleagues. The Volunteer Training Corps were raised with overage or reserved occupation men early in the war, and were initially self-organised into many small corps, with a wide variety of names. Recognition of the corps by the authorities brought regulation and as the war continued the small corps were formed into battalion sized units of the county Volunteer Regiment. In 1918 these were linked to county regiments.

Battalion	Formed	Served	Fate
Regular
1st	1661	Western Front	
2nd	1663	Western Front, Italy	
Special Reserve
3rd (Reserve)		Britain	
Territorial Force
1/4th	1859	India	See Inter-War
1/5th	1859	India, Mesopotamian	
2/4th	Croydon, August 1914	Gallipoli, Palestine, Western Front, Germany	Disbanded February 1919
2/5th	Guildford, September 1914	Britain	Disbanded September 1917
3/4th	Windsor, June 1915	Western Front	Disbanded 11 February 1918
3/5th	Guildford, June 1915	Britain	Became 5th (Reserve) Battalion, 8 April 1916
4/4th	Croydon, July 1915	Britain	Became 4th (Reserve) Battalion
4th (Reserve) Battalion	8 April 1916	Britain	Disbanded 1919
5th (Reserve) Battalion	8 April 1916	Britain	Absorbed by 4th (Reserve) Battalion, 1 September 1916
19th	Lowestoft, 1 January 1917 from 69th Provisional Battalion (Territorial Force)	Britain	Disbanded 1919
20th	Cromer, 1 June 1918	Britain	Absorbed by 21st (Service) Battalion, Middlesex Regiment (Islington), 3 July 1918
New Army
6th (Service)	Guildford, August 1914	Western Front	Disbanded 1919
7th (Service)	Guildford, September 1914	Western Front	Disbanded 1919
8th (Service)	Guildford, September 1914	Western Front	Disbanded 1919
9th (Reserve)	Gravesend, October 1914	Britain	Amalgamated with 11th (R) Bn East Surreys to form 21st Training Reserve Battalion, 1 September 1916
10th (Service) (Battersea)	Battersea, 3 June 1915	Western Front, Italy, Germany	Disbanded 1920
11th (Service) (Lambeth)	Lambeth, 16 June 1915	Western Front, Italy, Germany	Disbanded 1920
12th (Reserve)	Coldharbour Lane, Brixton, October 1915	Britain	Became the 97th Training Reserve Battalion, 1 September 1916
Others
13th (Labour)	Balmer, 1916	France	Transferred to the Labour Corps, 1 June 1917
14th (Labour)	Crawley, 1916	Salonika	Transferred to the Labour Corps, 1 June 1917
15th (Labour)	Crawley, 1916	France	Transferred to the Labour Corps, 1 June 1917
16th (Home Service)	Farnham, 11 November 1916	Britain	Disbanded 1919
17th (Labour)	Crawley, November 1916	Britain	Transferred to the Labour Corps, and became Eastern Command Labour Centre along with 18th (Labour) Battalion, June 1917
18th (Labour)	Crawley, November 1916	Britain	Transferred to the Labour Corps, and became Eastern Command Labour Centre along with 17th (Labour) Battalion, June 1917
51st (Graduated)	Thoresby, 27 October 1917 from 245th (Infantry) Battalion, Training Reserve	Britain, Germany	Became a service battalion 8 February 1919; absorbed into 10th (Battersea) Bn 1 April 1919
52nd (Graduated)	Colchester, 27 October 1917 from 255th (Infantry) Battalion, Training Reserve	Britain, Germany	Became a service battalion 8 February 1919; absorbed into 11th (Lambeth) Bn 17 April 1919
53rd (Young Soldier)	St Albans, 27 October 1917	Britain, Germany	Became a service battalion 8 February 1919; absorbed into 2/4th Bn April 1919
Volunteer Training Corps
1st Battalion Surrey Volunteer Regiment later the 1st Volunteer Battalion, Queen's Royal Regiment (West Surrey)		Croydon	Disbanded post war
4th Battalion Surrey Volunteer Regiment later the 2nd Volunteer Battalion, Queen's Royal Regiment (West Surrey)		Reigate	Disbanded post war
6th Battalion Surrey Volunteer Regiment later the 3rd Volunteer Battalion, Queen's Royal Regiment (West Surrey)		Guildford	Disbanded post war

== Inter-War ==
By 1920, all of the regiment's war-raised battalions had disbanded. The Special Reserve reverted to its militia designation in 1921, then to the Supplementary Reserve in 1924; however, its battalions were effectively placed in 'suspended animation'. As World War II approached, the Territorial Army was reorganised in the mid-1930s, many of its infantry battalions were converted to other roles, especially anti-aircraft. The regiment was also reassigned 22nd (County of London) and 24th battalions of the London Regiment, which disbanded in 1938; these became the 6th (Bermondsey) and 7th (Southwark) battalions of the regiment.

Battalion	Fate
4th	Became 4th Battalion, The Queen's Royal Regiment (West Surrey) (63rd Searchlight Regiment), 1 November 1938; transferred to Royal Artillery 1 August 1940

== Second World War ==
The Queen's Royal's expansion during the Second World War was modest compared to 1914–1918. Existing battalions formed duplicates as in the First World War, while National Defence Companies were combined to create a new "Home Defence" battalion. In addition to this, 19 battalions of the Home Guard were affiliated to the regiment, wearing its cap badge. By 1944, one anti-aircraft unit was also part of the regiment. A Light Anti-Aircraft (LAA) troop was formed from the Southern Railways battalion to defend railways around Guildford and Woking. Due to the daytime (or shift working) occupations of these men, the batteries required eight times the manpower of an equivalent regular battery.

Battalion	Formed	Served	Fate
Regular
1st	1661	India (NWF), Burma	See Post-World War II
2nd	1663	Egypt, Syria, Ceylon, Burma	See Post-World War II
Supplementary Reserve
3rd	Not Reformed		
Territorial Army
1/5th	1859	France, Dunkirk, North Africa, Tunisia, Italy, North West Europe	See Post-World War II
1/6th (Bermondsey)	1937	France, Dunkirk, North Africa, Tunisia, Italy, North West Europe	See Post-World War II
1/7th (Southwark)	1937	France, Dunkirk, North Africa, Tunisia, Italy, North West Europe	See Post-World War II
2/5th	1939	France, Dunkirk, Italy	Absorbed by 1/5th, and reconstituted as 5th battalion, 1 January 1947
2/6th (Bermondsey)	1939	France, Dunkirk, Italy	Absorbed by 1/6th (Bermondsey), and reconstituted as 6th (Bermondsey) Battalion, 1 April 1947
2/7th (Southwark)	1939	France, Dunkirk, Italy	Absorbed by 1/7th (Southwark), 1 April 1947
Hostilities only
11th (Home Defence)	1939	Britain	Redesignated as 30th Battalion, August 1943
12th (Home Defence)	1939	Britain	Amalgamated with 10th (Home Defence) Battalion of the Middlesex Regiment, forming 30th Battalion, The Middlesex Regiment, 24 July 1941
14th	Dorchester, 4 July 1940	Britain	Converted into 99th Light Anti-Aircraft Regiment, Royal Artillery, 1 December 1941
15th	9 October 1940, redesignation of 50th (Holding) Battalion	Britain	Disbanded, 4 December 1943
20th	Aldershot, 27 May 1940, from 5th Battalion Scots Guards	Britain	Disbanded, 3 May 1940
30th	August 1943, redesignation of 11th Battalion	Britain	Absorbed into 30th Battalion, The Middlesex Regiment, October 1945
31st	Aldershot	Britain	Disbanded, 15 May 1946
50th (Holding)	Caterham, May 1940	Britain	Redesignated as 15th Battalion, 9 October 1940
70th (Young Soldiers)	16 September 1940, from two companies of 11th (Home Service) Battalion	Britain	Converted to 17th PTC, 1942

Home Guard
Battalion	Headquarters	Formation Sign (dark blue on khaki)	Battalion	Headquarters	Formation Sign (dark blue on khaki)
Surrey
1st	Camberley	SY 1	2nd	Farnham	SY 2
4th	Weybridge	SY 4	5th	Bramley	SY 5
7th	Dorking	SY 7	8th	Reigate	SY 8
9th	Oxted	SY 9	11th	Woking	SY 11
12th (3rd Bn Southern Railway)	Woking	SY 12	13th (Admiralty Signals Establishment)	Haslemere	SY 13
32nd	Croydon	SY 32	33rd	County Borough of Croydon	SY 33
58th	Purley	SY 58	59th	Addington	SY 59
60th	Croydon	SY 60	61st	Norwood	SY 61
62nd	Norbury	SY 62			
County of London
29th	Battersea	COL 29	56th	Balham	COL 56
Home Guard Anti-Aircraft units
Formation Sign (dark blue on khaki)	Headquarters or Location	AA Formation and Designation	Formation Sign (dark blue on khaki)	Headquarters or Location	AA Formation and Designation
COL 71	Croydon	71st Battery, 16th Anti-Aircraft Regiment (Home Guard) (HAA)	SY 12	Guildford and Woking, (Southern Railways)	A Troop LAA

== Post-World War II ==
In the immediate post-war period, the army was significantly reduced: nearly all infantry regiments had their first and second battalions amalgamated and the Supplementary Reserve disbanded. A defence review by Duncan Sandys in 1957 decided that the Queen's Royal Regiment would be amalgamated with the East Surrey Regiment, to form the Queen's Royal Surrey Regiment. They united as the 1st Battalion on 14 October 1959.

Battalion	Fate
1st	Amalgamated with 1st East Surreys to form the 1st Battalion, Queen's Royal Surrey Regiment, 1959
2nd	Disbanded, 1948
3rd	Disbanded, 1953
5th	Amalgamated with 565 (Surrey) LAA Regiment, Royal Artillery, and 6th (Bermondsey) Battalion, forming 3rd Battalion, The Queen's Royal Surrey Regiment, 1 May 1961
6th (Bermondsey)	Amalgamated with 565 LAA Regiment, Royal Artillery, and 5th Battalion, forming 3rd Battalion, The Queen's Royal Surrey Regiment, 1 May 1961
7th (Southwark)	Transferred to the Royal Artillery, as 622nd Heavy Anti-Aircraft Regiment (7th Battalion The Queen's Royal Regiment), 1 April 1947
