= 1st Royal Surrey Militia =

Auxiliary unit of the British Army

1st Royal Surrey Militia 3rd Battalion, East Surrey Regiment
- Active: 18 April 1759–1 April 1953
- Country: Kingdom of Great Britain (1763–1800); United Kingdom (1801–1953)
- Branch: Militia/Special Reserve
- Role: Infantry
- Garrison/HQ: Richmond upon Thames; The Barracks, Kingston upon Thames
- Nickname: 'Old Surrey Militia'
- Engagements: Second Boer War

Commanders
- Notable commanders: George Onslow, 1st Earl of Onslow; Sir George Douglas Clerk, 8th Baronet of Penicuik; Brig-Gen Sir Charles Orby Shipley

The 1st Royal Surrey Militia, later the 3rd Battalion, East Surrey Regiment was an auxiliary (Note: It is incorrect to describe the British Militia as 'irregular': throughout their history they were equipped and trained exactly like the line regiments of the regular army, and once embodied in time of war they were fulltime professional soldiers for the duration of their enlistment.) regiment raised in Surrey in the Home Counties of England. From its formal creation in 1759 the regiment served in home defence in all of Britain's major wars until 1918, seeing active service in the Second Boer War and supplying reinforcements to the East Surreys during World War I.

== Background ==
The universal obligation to military service in the Shire levy was long established in England and its legal basis was updated by two acts of 1557 (4 & 5 Ph. & M. cc. 2 and 3), which placed selected men, the 'trained bands', under the command of Lords Lieutenant appointed by the monarch. This is seen as the starting date for the organised county militia in England. The Surrey Trained Bands formed part of the army at Tilbury during the Armada campaign of 1588, and some elements saw active service during the English Civil War. The Militia was re-established in 1661 after the restoration of the monarchy, and was popularly seen as the 'Constitutional Force' in contrast to the 'Standing Army' that was tainted by association with the New Model Army that had supported the military dictatorship of the Protectorate. However, the Militia declined in the years after the Peace of Utrecht in 1713.

=== Seven Years' War ===
Under threat of French invasion during the Seven Years' War a series of Militia Acts from 1757 re-established county militia regiments, the men being conscripted by means of parish ballots (paid substitutes were permitted) to serve for three years. An adjutant and drill sergeants were provided to each regiment from the Regular Army, and arms and accoutrements were supplied when the county had secured 60 percent of its quota of recruits. Surrey was given a quota of 800 men to raise under the command of the Lord-Lieutenant of Surrey, Richard Onslow, 3rd Baron Onslow.

Arms for the Surrey Militia were authorised on 23 February 1759 and the regiment was formed at Richmond-upon-Thames on 18 April 1759. By now Lord Onslow had resigned the colonelcy (he remained lord lieutenant) and had been replaced by Sir Nicholas Hacket Carew, 2nd Baronet, of Beddington, with the lord lieutenant's kinsman George Onslow as lieutenant-colonel. The 10 companies were distributed as follows:

- Croydon
- Southwark
- Kingston upon Thames
- Camberwell
- Reigate
- Chertsey
- Clapham
- Guildford
- Putney
- Godalming

The regiment was embodied for full-time service from 6 July 1759 and marched to Kent, where the companies were distributed. In August they were concentrated again at Frindsbury. On 3 November the regiment was split into two battalions of five companies each, the 1st or Eastern commanded by Carew and the 2nd or Western by Onslow with the writer Francis Grose as his adjutant. They then went into winter quarters in Surrey, the 1st Bn at Kingston, the 2nd at Putney, Fulham and Wandsworth. Thereafter the regiments were frequently moved about the country, one of their duties being to guard French prisoners of war, beginning in May 1760 when the two battalions alternated this duty at Maidstone in Kent. In November the 1st Bn was at Salisbury in Wiltshire and the 2nd had just marched through Essex to Northampton. The Peace of Fontainebleau was signed on 3 November 1762, ending the war, and the regiment was quartered at Lewes in Sussex when on 3 December it was ordered to march back to Surrey to be disembodied. The following year the two battalions were merged into a single regiment again; Sir Nicholas Carew had died in August 1762, so George Onslow was appointed colonel of the amalgamated regiment.

=== American War of Independence ===
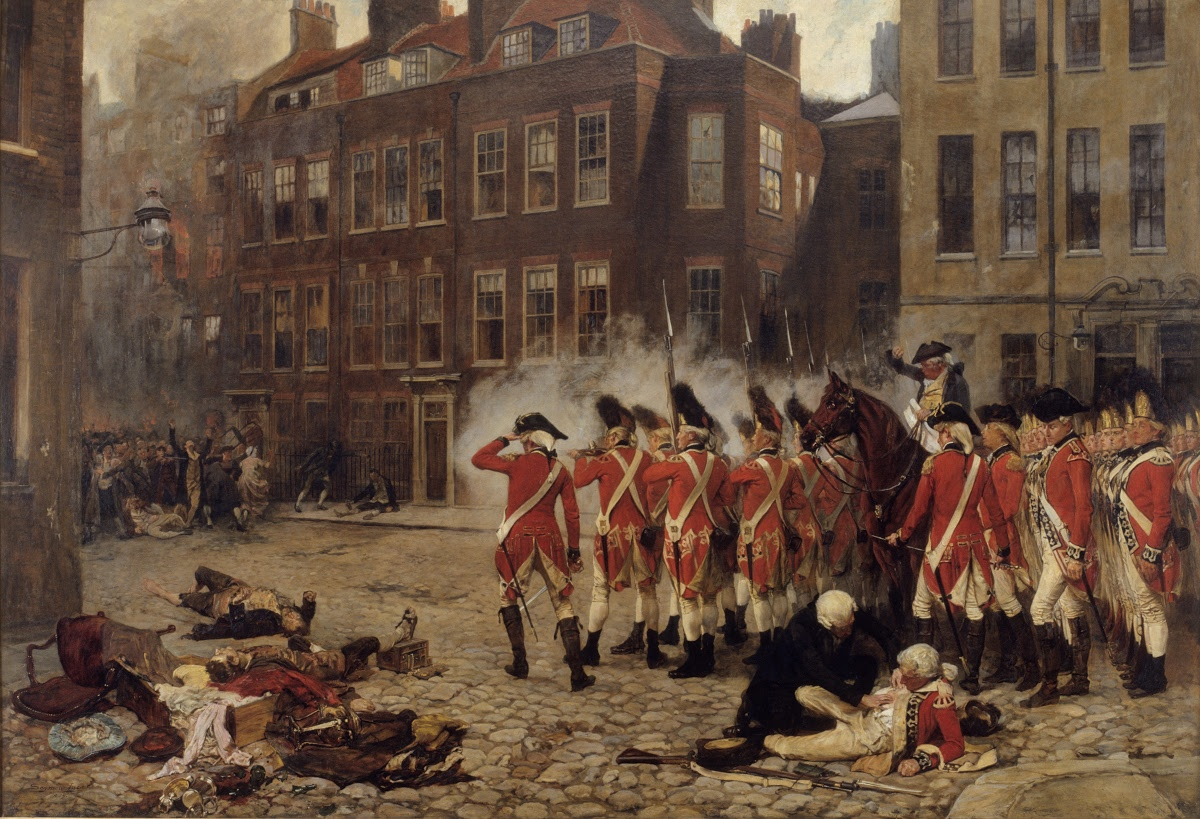
Troops firing on the Gordon Rioters in The Gordon Riots, painted by John Seymour Lucas in 1879

The Militia was called out after the outbreak of the War of American Independence when the country was threatened with invasion by the Americans' allies, France and Spain. The Surrey regiment was embodied on 26 March 1778, and that summer was at Coxheath Camp near Maidstone, which was the army's largest training camp, where the Militia were exercised as part of a division alongside Regular troops while providing a reserve in case of French invasion of South East England. The Surreys under Colonel Jeremiah Hodge formed part of the Right Wing under Major-General William Amherst. Each battalion had two small field-pieces or 'battalion guns' attached to it, manned by men of the regiment instructed by a Royal Artillery sergeant and two gunners. In 1779 the regiment was at Gosport guarding 1500 Prisoners of War in a former seamen's hospital when the militiamen foiled an attempt to tunnel out and a plot to overcome the guards, who were increased. In 1780 some of the Surrey companies were stationed at Ringwood in Hampshire, where they were called upon to assist the Revenue officers against smuggling. In June that year the regiment was deployed on the streets of London against the Gordon Riots, clearing the streets and bridges with the bayonet when parties of rioters refused to disperse. From 1 July 1782 the regiment was in summer camp at Chatham, Kent, once again brigaded with regulars and other militia. It was disembodied on 28 February 1783 after the signing of the Peace of Paris.

In September 1759 it had been ordered that militia regiments on service were to take precedence from the date of their arrival in camp. In 1760 this was altered to a system of drawing lots where regiments did duty together. During the War of American Independence the counties were given an order of precedence determined by ballot each year, beginning in 1778. For the Surrey Militia the positions were:

- 16th on 1 June 1778
- 5th on 12 May 1779
- 21st on 6 May 1780
- 16th on 28 April 1781
- 35th on 7 May 1782

From 1784 to 1792 the militia were assembled for their 28 days' annual peacetime training, but to save money only two-thirds of the men were actually mustered each year.

=== French Wars ===
In view of the worsening international situation in late 1792 the militia was called out, even though Revolutionary France did not declare war on Britain until 1 February 1793. The Surrey Militia was embodied on 1 December 1792. The French Revolutionary Wars saw a new phase for the English militia: they were embodied for a whole generation, and became regiments of full-time professional soldiers (though restricted to service within the British Isles), which the regular army increasingly saw as a prime source of recruits. They served in coast defences, manning garrisons, guarding prisoners of war, and for internal security, while their traditional local defence duties were taken over by the Volunteers. The militia order of precedence balloted for in 1793 (Surrey was 18th) remained in force throughout the French Revolutionary War.

In 1797, to release regulars for overseas service, the strength of the Militia was increased by the creation of the Supplementary Militia, also raised by means of the ballot. A third of Surrey's Supplementary Militia quota (820 men) was assigned as reinforcements to the 'Old Surrey Militia', as the original regiment became known. The remainder were to form two supplementary regiments. Surrey has been described as one of the 'black spots' in recruitment for the Supplementary Militia (especially compared to the Volunteers), so although the 1st Surrey Supplementary Militia was successfully raised (and became the permanent 2nd Surrey Militia the following year) the 2nd regiment (intended to be the 3rd Surrey Militia) never reached establishment and was disbanded.

The Old Surrey Militia, which officially became the 1st Surrey Militia on 17 August 1798, now consisted of 12 companies. At the end of 1797 it was stationed at Sunderland in the North East and York District, brigaded with other militia regiments.

A peace treaty having been agreed (the Treaty of Amiens), most of the militia were disembodied in 1802, but the Peace of Amiens broke down in 1803 before the 1st Surreys could be disembodied and the regiment remained in service. On 23 April 1804 both the Surrey militia regiments were granted the title 'Royal', the 1st becoming the 1st Royal Surrey Militia (1st RSM). Another ballot for precedence took place at the start of the Napoleonic War: Surrey was 41st. These 'regular', 'ordinary' or 'permanent' regiments of embodied militia should not be confused with the Local Militia, part-time units formed in 1809 to replace the various Volunteer units in the county; eventually there were five Local Militia regiments in Surrey.

Militia duties during the Napoleonic War were much as before: home defence and garrisons, prisoners of war, and increasingly internal security in the industrial areas where there was unrest. During the summer of 1805, when Napoleon was massing his 'Army of England' at Boulogne for a projected invasion, the 1st RSM was stationed at Dover. On 1 September 1805, with 608 men in eight companies under the command of Lt-Col John Waterhouse, was at the Western Heights as part of Maj-Gen Lord Forbes's militia brigade. The regiment also served in Ireland for a couple of years, returning in 1811. From 1813 the militia were invited to volunteer for limited overseas service, primarily for garrison duties in Europe. The 1st RSM supplied a detachment of one officer and 30 men for the 1st Provisional Battalion in the Militia Brigade. This embarked on 10–11 March 1814 and joined the Earl of Dalhousie's division that had occupied Bordeaux just as the war was ending. The brigade did not form part of the Army of Occupation after the abdication of Napoleon and returned to England in June.

After Napoleon's exile to Elba the 1st RSM was disembodied on 24 June 1814, but it was called out again on 29 June 1815 during the Waterloo campaign. At the beginning of the campaign several regular regiments including the Scots Guards were hurriedly brought up to strength with militia volunteers before embarking for Belgium. There is a story that many of the Guardsmen at Waterloo were still clad in Surrey Militia uniforms. The 1st RSM was finally disembodied on 30 April 1816.

=== Long peace ===
Although officers continued to be commissioned into the militia during the long peace after the Battle of Waterloo, and ballots were still held until suspended by the Militia Act 1829, the regiments were rarely assembled for training and the permanent staffs of sergeants and drummers (who were occasionally used to maintain public order) were progressively reduced.

The militia order of precedence balloted for in the Napoleonic War remained in force until 1833. In that year the King drew the lots for individual regiments and the resulting list remained in force with minor amendments until the end of the militia. The regiments raised before the peace of 1763 took the first 47 places: both Surrey regiments were deemed to predate 1763 (even though the 2nd had disappeared until 1797), and the 2nd RSM was allotted 11th place, the 1st RSM only 20th. Formally, the regiment became the 20th, or 1st Royal Surrey Militia: most regiments paid little notice, but the 1st RSM did include the numeral in its badge (see below).

== 1852 reform ==
The Militia was revived by the Militia Act 1852, enacted during a period of international tension. As before, units were raised and administered on a county basis, and filled by voluntary enlistment (although conscription by means of the militia ballot might be used if the counties failed to meet their quotas). Training was for 56 days on enlistment, then for 21–28 days per year, during which the men received full army pay. Under the Act, militia units could be embodied by Royal Proclamation for full-time home defence service in three circumstances:

1. 'Whenever a state of war exists between Her Majesty and any foreign power'.
2. 'In all cases of invasion or upon imminent danger thereof'.
3. 'In all cases of rebellion or insurrection'.

The existing militia regiments were reorganised, with most of the old officers and permanent staff pensioned off and replaced, and annual training was resumed. The 1st RSM was reorganised under Col William Holme-Sumner and was assembled for its first training at Richmond on 3 May 1853. The raising of the new 3rd Royal Surrey Militia at Kingston curtailed the recruiting area of the 1st RSM.

=== Crimean War and Indian Mutiny ===
War having broken out with Russia in 1854 and an expeditionary force sent to the Crimea, the Militia were called out for home defence. The 1st RSM was embodied for service from 28 December 1854, and in May 1855 it moved into the C and D Lines at Aldershot Camp, alongside the Royal East Middlesex Militia; they were the first two militia units to be sent to Aldershot. In September the 1st RSM moved to Portsmouth, where it remained until it was disembodied on 10 June 1856. It was called out again from 5 November 1857 during the absence of many of the Regular units fighting the Indian Mutiny. It was stationed at Clonmel in Ireland until it was disembodied on 22 January 1858.

Thereafter the regiment was called out for its annual training. As an experiment in 1867 this was held in May at Aldershot in conjunction with the regular division stationed there. The camp ended with a divisional field day and was considered a success, being repeated in subsequent years. The 1st RSM attended in 1868 and again in 1871, when extensive Autumn Manoeuvres were conducted.

== Cardwell reforms ==
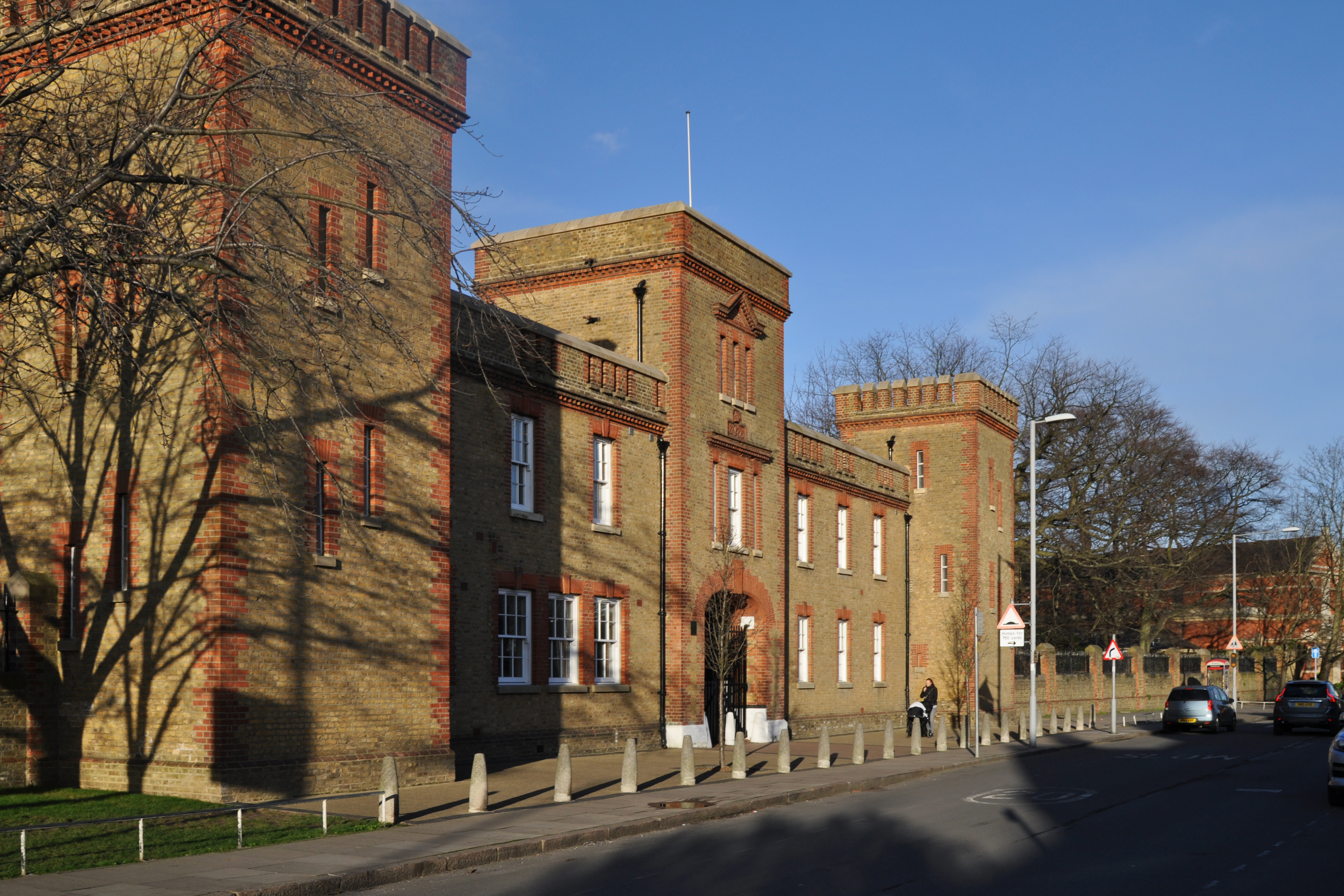
'The Keep', Kingston Barracks

Under the 'Localisation of the Forces' scheme introduced by the Cardwell Reforms of 1872, Militia regiments were brigaded with their local regular and Volunteer battalions – for the 1st RSM this was with the 31st (Huntingdonshire) and 70th (Surrey) Regiments of Foot and the 3rd RSM in Sub-District No 47 (County of Surrey) with a shared depot at Kingston. The Barracks, Kingston upon Thames, was built for the brigade depot in 1874–5; the 1st RSM moved there from Richmond before the end of 1880. The Militia now came under the War Office rather than their county lords lieutenant.

Although often referred to as brigades, the sub-districts were purely administrative organisations, but in a continuation of the Cardwell Reforms a mobilisation scheme began to appear in the Army List from December 1875. This assigned Regular and Militia units to places in an order of battle of corps, divisions and brigades for the 'Active Army', even though these formations were entirely theoretical, with no staff or services assigned. The 1st, 2nd and 3rd RSM were assigned to 2nd Brigade of 2nd Division, III Corps. The brigade would have mustered at Redhill in time of war.

== 3rd Battalion, East Surrey Regiment ==
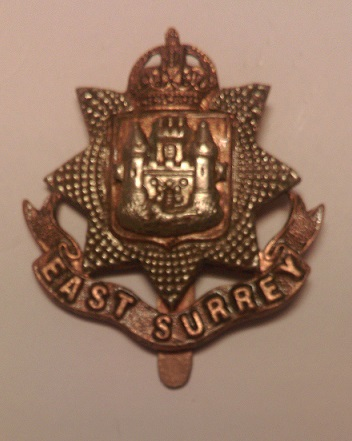
Cap badge of the East Surrey Regiment

The Childers Reforms of 1881 took Cardwell's reforms further, with the linked regiments becoming two-battalion regiments and the militia formally joining as their 3rd and 4th Battalions. The 31st and 70th Foot became the East Surrey Regiment and the 1st and 3rd RSM became the 3rd and 4th Battalions on 1 July 1881 (the 2nd RSM became 3rd Bn Queen's Royal Regiment (West Surrey)). Militia battalions now had a large cadre of permanent staff (about 30). Around a third of the recruits and many young officers went on to join the Regular Army. The Militia Reserve consisted of present and former militiamen who undertook to serve overseas in case of war.

The 3rd Bn East Surrey was embodied from 9 March to 30 September 1885 during the Panjdeh Crisis.

=== Second Boer War ===
After the disasters of Black Week at the start of the Second Boer War in December 1899, most of the Regular Army was sent to South Africa, and many militia units were embodied to replace them for home defence and to garrison certain overseas stations. The 3rd East Surreys were embodied on 12 May 1900 and was quartered at Perham Down Camp on Salisbury Plain. The battalion was disembodied on 19 October, but was embodied again on 6 May 1901 and volunteered for overseas service.

The battalion embarked on 5 June 1901 at Southampton Docks aboard the hired transport Idaho and disembarked at Port Elizabeth in South Africa on 1 July with a strength of 23 officers and 617 other ranks (ORs) under its commanding officer, Lt-Col Sir George Douglas Clerk, 8th Baronet of Penicuik. It occupied various posts along the line of communications from Port Elizabeth to the Orange River bridge at Norvalspont, with battalion headquarters established at Colesberg and a detachment at Stormberg. It was involved in an action at Kalkfontein on 28 November. On 29 December the battalion moved via Naauwpoort to De Aar and took over the blockhouse line from Victoria West to Beaufort West. On 5 February 1902 a detachment on convoy duty suffered casualties in an action at Uitspanfontein. Later that month, C and D Companies trekked to Clanwilliam and Williston to help build and man a new blockhouse line, H Company joining them later. In March, seven companies moved to Simon's Town where they mounted guard over 1700 Boer prisoners. The Treaty of Vereeniging was signed on 31 May 1902, and in June the 3rd East Surreys concentrated at Green Point to embark for home.

The battalion embarked for England early in July 1902, arriving at Southampton on 26 July and being disembodied at Kingston the same day. (Note: Other sources suggest that it was not disembodied until 10 October.) During the campaign the battalion had lost two officers and 9 ORs killed or died of wounds or sickness. The battalion was awarded the Battle honour South Africa 1901–02 and the participants were awarded the Queen's South Africa Medal with clasps for 'Cape Colony', 'Orange Free State', 'South Africa 1901' and 'South Africa 1902'.

== Special Reserve ==
After the Boer War, the future of the Militia was called into question. There were moves to reform the Auxiliary Forces (Militia, Yeomanry and Volunteers) to take their place in the six Army Corps proposed by the Secretary of State for War, St John Brodrick. However, little of Brodrick's scheme was carried out.

Under the more sweeping Haldane Reforms of 1908, the Militia was replaced by the Special Reserve (SR), a semi-professional force whose role was to provide reinforcement drafts for Regular units serving overseas in wartime, rather like the earlier Militia Reserve. The battalion became the 3rd (Reserve) Battalion, East Surrey Regiment, on 9 August 1908; 425 out of 582 ORs agreed to transfer to the SR.

== World War I ==
=== 3rd (Reserve) Battalion ===
On the outbreak of World War I the 3rd East Surreys were embodied on 8 August 1914 at Kingston under Lt-Col C.O. Shipley, who had been CO since 1912. Made up of Special Reservists and the Regular Reservists at the depot, the battalion left by train the same night for its war station at Dover where it remained for the whole war. On the outbreak of war the 3rd East Surreys claimed to be the only SR battalion with a full complement of officers, of whom all the juniors had been trained by the 1st Bn.

The battalion was accommodated in the Grand Shaft Barracks and established outposts along the cliffs and guards at vital points such as South Breakwater, Turret Battery, Abbott's Cliff and the 'Valiant Sailor'. As well as forming part of the Dover Garrison, the battalion's role was to train and form drafts of reservists, special reservists, recruits and returning wounded for the regular battalions. The 1st East Surreys served on the Western Front, with a short spell on the Italian Front, while the 2nd Bn returned from India and after a few months on the Western Front spent the rest of the war on the Macedonian front. The 3rd Bn sent its first draft for the 1st Bn (one officer and 93 ORs) on 26 August 1914, followed by others at roughly two-weekly intervals.

The 3rd Bn also assisted in forming some of the Service battalions of 'Kitchener's Army' volunteers. The first of these, the 7th Bn East Surreys, for 'Kitchener's First Army' (K1), was formed at Kingston, and a draft of 32 men was sent from the 3rd Bn at Dover as a cadre to help organise and train them. At the beginning of September the eight companies (A to H) were amalgamated to conform with the standard four-company (A to D) establishment of the regular army. However, the 3rd Bn immediately began forming new companies E to H; A to D were regarded as service companies composed of trained men, E to H were to be recruit companies. The additional companies were accommodated in tents on the Glacis of the Dover fortifications. Later a 200-strong special training company (I) was also established. On 16 October the formation of the 10th (Service) Battalion East Surreys of K4 was ordered for 1 November. G, H and I Companies of 3rd Bn formed A, B and C Companies of the new battalion (see below). At the end of January 1915 the 3rd Bn was back to a strength of seven companies, which were now numbered instead of lettered. Number 8 Company was formed in late March 1915 from a nucleus of the battalion machine gun and signal sections.

On 10 November 1915 3rd Bn was ordered to send a draft of 109 men to the new Machine Gun Training Centre at Grantham where they were to form the basis of a machine-gun company of the new Machine Gun Corps for one of the brigades serving overseas. In addition, 10 men at a time were to undergo training at Grantham as battalion machine gunners. The order stated that 'Great care should be taken in the selection of men for training as machine gunners as only well educated and intelligent men are suitable for this work'.

During the war 911 officers and 19,040 ORs passed through the ranks of the 3rd East Surreys during the war, of whom 13,029 went overseas, mainly to the fighting battalions of the East Surreys. On 19 November 1918, just after the Armistice, the 3rd Bn moved from Dover to Bridge of Allan in Scotland, and then in February 1919 to Glasgow, where there was industrial unrest. It then went to Clipstone Camp in Nottinghamshire, where it was disembodied on 31 July 1919, its remaining personnel being posted to the 2nd Bn on 15 August.

=== 10th (Reserve) Battalion ===
After Lord Kitchener issued his call for volunteers in August 1914, the battalions of the 1st, 2nd and 3rd New Armies ('K1', 'K2' and 'K3' of 'Kitchener's Army') were quickly formed at the regimental depots. The SR battalions also swelled with new recruits and were soon well above their establishment strength. On 8 October 1914 each SR battalion was ordered to use the surplus to form a service battalion of the 4th New Army ('K4'). Accordingly, the 3rd (Reserve) Bn at Dover formed the 10th (Service) Battalion of the East Surreys on 26 October 1914, and on 1 November G, H and I Companies of the 3rd (R) Bn (400 men, mainly from South London, Croydon and Richmond) were transferred to it to provide the nucleus. Lieutenant-Col E.F. Sulivan was appointed to command it on18 November. The other battalions of the Special Reserve Bde at Dover carried out a similar process, and the K4 battalions of the Buffs (9th Bn), Royal Fusiliers (14th and 15th Bns) and 10th East Surreys constituted 95th Brigade in 32nd Division. 10th East Surreys was initially camped on the Glacis at Dover until mid-November when it moved into Old Mills Barracks, training for overseas service. On 10 April 1915 the War Office decided to convert the K4 battalions into 2nd Reserve units, to provide drafts for the K1–K3 battalions in the same way that the SR was doing for the Regular battalions. The East Surrey battalion became 10th (Reserve) Battalion, training reinforcements for the 7th 8th and 9th (Service) Bns, and 95th Bde became 7th Reserve Brigade.The battalion moved to Purfleet on 18 May 1915 and Shoreham-by-Sea on 21 September 1915, before returning to the Oil Mills Barracks at Dover on 15 March 1916.It later moved into the Maxton Road Camp at Dover. On 1 September 1916 the 2nd Reserve battalions were transferred to the Training Reserve (TR) and the battalion was redesignated 30th Training Reserve Bn, still in 7th Reserve Bde. The training staff retained their East Surrey badges. It was disbanded at Clipstone Camp on 14 December 1917.

=== Postwar ===
The SR resumed its old title of Militia in 1921 but like most militia battalions the 3rd East Surreys remained in abeyance after World War I. By the outbreak of World War II in 1939, only two officers (both commissioned in 1915) remained listed for the battalion. The Militia was formally disbanded in April 1953.

== Commanders ==
The following officers commanded the regiment as Colonel or (after the 1852 reforms) as Lieutenant-Colonel commandant:

- Richard Onslow, 3rd Baron Onslow, commissioned 15 August 1758; resigned 1759
- Sir Nicholas Hacket Carew, 2nd Baronet, commissioned 5 October 1759, died August 1762
- George Onslow, commissioned to 2nd Bn 3 November 1759; to combined regiment 26 February 1763; resigned 20 October 1765 when he became a government minister; later succeeded as 4th Baron Onslow and created Earl of Onslow
- Jeremiah Hodges, from 1765
- J.B. Delap, 1840s
- Fitzroy Campbell, former Lt-Col, Scots Fusilier Guards, appointed 13 January 1853
- William Holme Sumner, appointed 2 August 1853, died 1859
- George Palmer Evelyn, former Capt, Rifle Brigade (Prince Consort's Own) and Turkish Contingent, author of A Diary of the Crimea, appointed Lt-Col 19 March 1856, commandant 31 December 1859; appointed Honorary Colonel 28 November 1883, died 1889.
- Carleton Smith, promoted Lt-Col 28 November 1883, resigned 25 February 1887
- Sir Thomas Lemmon, CB, of Ewhurst Place, promoted Lt-Col 26 February 1887; appointed Hon Col 29 October 1898, reappointed to 3rd Bn (SR) 29 October 1908
- Sir George Douglas Clerk, 8th Baronet of Penicuik, former Lt, 2nd Life Guards, appointed Lt-Col 4 January 1899; simultaneously Hon Col of 6th Volunteer Bn, Royal Scots
- John C. Worthington, promoted Lt-Col by 1907
- C.O. Shipley, former 2nd Lt, King's Shropshire Light Infantry, appointed Lt-Col 13 February 1912; awarded CB (civil) in 1916 New Year Honours while commanding 3rd Bn; later Brigadier-General Sir Charles Orby Shipley
- A.J.D. Hay, appointed Lt-Col 13 February 1918

=== Other personalities ===
- Francis Grose, antiquary and author, was appointed lieutenant and adjutant of the 2nd or Western Regiment on its formation on 3 November 1759. He later served in the same role in the merged regiment on 2 March 1763 after the conclusion of peace, being promoted to captain-lieutenant on 21 October 1765 and full captain on 1 January 1766. He was author of Advice to the Officers of the British Army.

== Uniforms and insignia ==
The uniform of the regiment in 1759 was red with white facings, the drummers' coats decorated with red and white lace and the words 'SURREY MILITIA' embroidered on the flap of their caps. The first Regimental Colour in 1759 was white (the regiment's facing colour), bearing the Coat of arms of Lord Onslow as lord lieutenant. A second pair of colours was requested when the regiment split into two battalions. A new regimental colour of the same pattern was issued in 1770. When the regiment was granted its 'Royal' title in 1804 the facings changed to blue, appropriate for a royal regiment

About 1810 the officers wore an oval gilt shoulder-belt plate bearing a crown within a garter bearing the words 'FIRST ROYAL SURREY REGT', the whole superimposed on a crowned star. In the 1870s officers' and ORs' cap badges showed the Roman numeral 'XX' within a crowned circle bearing the inscription 'FIRST ROYAL SURREY' – despite the fact that militia regiments had been ordered not to use their 1833 numbers.

After the 1st RSM became the 3rd East Surreys, new colours were presented to the battalion in 1884 by the Countess of Lovelace, wife of the lord lieutenant, the Earl of Lovelace. These colours were carried until the disembodiment of the battalion in 1919.

== Memorial ==
There is a memorial plaque (unveiled in July 1904) on the west wall inside Southwark Cathedral to the Second Boer War casualties of the 3rd Bn East Surrey Regiment, formerly 1st Royal Surrey Militia.

== See also ==
- Surrey Militia
- Surrey Trained Bands
- 2nd Royal Surrey Militia
- 3rd Royal Surrey Militia
- East Surrey Regiment
