= 2nd Royal Surrey Militia =

Auxiliary unit of the British Army

2nd Royal Surrey Militia 3rd Battalion, Queen's (Royal West Surrey Regiment)
- Active: 2 January 1797–1 April 1953
- Country: Kingdom of Great Britain (1797–1800); United Kingdom (1801–1953)
- Branch: Militia
- Role: Infantry
- Garrison/HQ: Guildford
- Engagements: Second Boer War; Defence of Okiep

Commanders
- Notable commanders: Thomas Onslow, 2nd Earl of Onslow; Hon Thomas Cranley Onslow; William King-Noel, 1st Earl of Lovelace; Col Frederick Fairtlough

The 2nd Royal Surrey Militia, later the 3rd Battalion, Queen's (Royal West Surrey Regiment) was an auxiliary (Note: It is incorrect to describe the British Militia as 'irregular': throughout their history they were equipped and trained exactly like the line regiments of the regular army, and once embodied in time of war they were fulltime professional soldiers for the duration of their enlistment.) regiment raised in Surrey in the Home counties of England. From its formal creation in 1797 the regiment served in home defence in all of Britain's major wars. It saw active service during the Second Boer War, including the Defence of Okiep, and trained thousands of reinforcements during World War I. After a shadowy postwar existence it was formally disbanded in 1953

== Background ==
The universal obligation to military service in the Shire levy was long established in England and its legal basis was updated by two acts of 1557 (4 & 5 Ph. & M. cc. 2 and 3), which placed selected men, the 'trained bands', under the command of Lords Lieutenant appointed by the monarch. This is seen as the starting date for the organised county militia in England. The Surrey Trained Bands formed part of the army at Tilbury during the Armada campaign of 1588, and some elements saw active service during the English Civil War. The Militia was re-established in 1661 after the restoration of the monarchy, and was popularly seen as the 'Constitutional Force' in contrast to the 'Standing Army' that was tainted by association with the New Model Army that had supported the military dictatorship of the Protectorate. However, the Militia declined in the years after the Peace of Utrecht in 1713.

Under threat of French invasion during the Seven Years' War a series of Militia Acts from 1757 re-established county militia regiments, the men being conscripted by means of parish ballots (paid substitutes were permitted) to serve for three years. Surrey was given a quota of 800 men to raise and the regiment was formed at Richmond-upon-Thames on 18 April 1759. On 3 November the regiment was split into two battalions of five companies each, the 1st or Eastern and the 2nd or Western. (Some sources trace the later 2nd Royal Surrey Militia back to this battalion.) The Peace of Fontainebleau was signed on 3 November 1762, ending the war, and the regiment was disembodied. The following year the two battalions were merged into a single regiment again.

The Militia was called out after the outbreak of the War of American Independence when the country was threatened with invasion by the Americans' allies, France and Spain. The Surrey Militia was embodied on 26 March 1778, and served throughout as a single regiment. In June 1780 the regiment was deployed on the streets of London against the Gordon Riots, clearing the streets and bridges with the bayonet when parties of rioters refused to disperse. It was disembodied on 28 February 1783 after the signing of the Peace of Paris.

In view of the worsening international situation in late 1792 the militia was called out, even though Revolutionary France did not declare war on Britain until 1 February 1793. The Surrey Militia was embodied on 1 December 1792. The French Revolutionary Wars saw a new phase for the English militia: they were embodied for a whole generation, and became regiments of full-time professional soldiers (though restricted to service within the British Isles), which the regular army increasingly saw as a prime source of recruits. They served in coast defences, manning garrisons, guarding prisoners of war, and for internal security, while their traditional local defence duties were taken over by the Volunteers.

== 2nd Royal Surrey Militia ==
=== French Revolutionary War ===
In 1797, to release regulars for overseas service, the strength of the Militia was increased by the creation of the Supplementary Militia, also raised by means of the ballot. A third of Surrey's Supplementary Militia quota (820 men) was assigned as reinforcements to the 'Old Surrey Militia', as the original regiment became known. The remainder were to form two supplementary regiments. Surrey has been described as one of the 'black spots' in recruitment for the Supplementary Militia (especially compared to the Volunteers), so although the 1st Surrey Supplementary Militia was successfully raised, the 2nd regiment never reached its establishment and was disbanded in 1799.

The first officers appointed to the 1st Surrey Supplementary Militia on 2 January 1797 included Colonel the Hon Thomas Onslow, Member of Parliament (MP) for Guildford and eldest son of the Lord Lieutenant of Surrey, Lord Onslow, and his Lieutenant-Colonel, Sir John Frederick, 5th Baronet, MP for Surrey.

The regiment was embodied for full-time service on 20 February 1798 at Kingston upon Thames and it became the permanent 2nd Surrey Militia the same year. Prior to the French Revolutionary War, the order of precedence for militia regiments had been decided by lot at the start of each camping season. However, the order balloted for in 1793 remained in force throughout the French Revolutionary War. Surrey's precedence of 18th applied to both regiments.

After assembling at Kingston the new regiment was sent to the Isle of Wight on anti-invasion duty. At first the regiment was quartered at Eling Barracks at West Cowes. While there, the Regimental Colours were presented: the ensigns who received the colours were Lieutenants Arthur George Onslow and Richard Frederick, the eldest sons of the colonel and lieutenant-colonel respectively. The regiment spent the summer of 1798 in camp in Parkhurst Forest, then went into winter quarters in Newport until May 1799 when it returned to Parkhurst. In July it returned to the mainland and was stationed at Plymouth Dock. During the year over 160 men of the regiment volunteered to transfer to the regular army, principally to the 9th Foot and the Brigade of Guards, and almost 300 had transferred by October 1800. With the lowered level of invasion alert in 1799, the militia quotas were reduced and many men of the supplementary militia were sent to their homes. Colonel Onslow argued strongly for the retention of the 2nd Surreys, even at a reduced establishment (Col Thomas Onslow was styled Viscount Cranley from 1801 when his father was advanced to an earldom). The regiment remained at Plymouth until November 1801 when it was marched to Winchester Barracks. However, preliminaries of peace had been signed, so in December the regiment was marched back to Surrey, where its companies were billeted in several villages until it was concentrated at Guildford to be disembodied on 25 April 1801.

=== Napoleonic Wars ===
However, the Peace of Amiens soon broke down and the 2nd Surreys were re-embodied on 11 March 1803. Once more Surrey was a black spot for militia recruitment, and of the quota of 288 men that should have been balloted for in Southwark only 22 arrived, many substitutes deserting as soon as they had pocketed their bounty. On 18 May, the day was war was declared, the 2nd Surreys marched from Guildford via Reigate, Sevenoaks and Maidstone to barracks at Ashford, Kent, arriving on 21 May. They were quartered in surrounding villages until the barracks were ready for occupation. On 30 December the regiment moved to Reading Street Barracks, Tenterden, where it stayed until the end of June 1804.

Another ballot for precedence took place at the start of the Napoleonic War: Surrey was 41st. On 23 April 1804 both the Surrey militia regiments were granted the title 'Royal', the 2nd becoming the 2nd Royal Surrey Militia (2nd RSM). These 'regular', 'ordinary' or 'permanent' regiments of embodied militia should not be confused with the Local Militia, part-time units formed in 1809 to replace the various Volunteer units in the county; eventually there were five Local Militia regiments in Surrey.

Militia duties during the Napoleonic War were much as before: home defence and garrisons, guarding prisoners of war, and increasingly internal security in the industrial areas where there was unrest. In June 1804 the 2nd RSM moved to Billericay in Essex, then in August to Danbury, with a detachment at Maldon. After a short spell at Chelmsford, the regiment returned to Danbury until March 1805, when it marched to Norman Cross Prison, which was a large Prisoner-of-war camp. In July it moved to Hull, with company detachments to Bridlington and Whitby on the coast. During the summer of 1805, when Napoleon was massing his 'Army of England' at Boulogne for a projected invasion, the 2nd RSM was part of a militia brigade under Maj-Gen Alexander McKenzie defending Hull. On 1 September 1805, the regiment had 561 men in eight companies under the command of Lt-Col Thomas Sutton. It remained at Hull throughout 1806. In April 1807 the 2nd RLM began a march to the Medway towns in Kent, but en route it was diverted to Barnet and Whetstone, north of London.

The threat of invasion had heightened after the Treaty of Tilsit between France and Russia, all leave was cancelled, and a ballot was held in Surrey to bring the militia up to full strength. In August the regiment moved to Hythe on the Kent coast with detachments guarding Twiss Fort and Sutherland Fort. In the crisis there was another drive to induce militiamen to volunteer for the regulars: the 2nd RLM was given a quota of 68, but over 100 men elected to join the 56th (West Essex) Regiment of Foot, including many of the sergeants and drummers. The regiment had a strength of just over 700 rank and file when it marched the Brabourne Lees camp on 1 February 1808, with very few non-commissioned officers (NCOs). From 1 March to 28 September it was at Reading Street Barracks, then spent the winter quartered at Ramsgate with a detachment at Margate before returning to the barracks on 1 February 1809. In April the regiment was moved out to quarters in coastal villages, then to Littlehampton by the end of the month. In June it moved to Pevensey and in July to Eastbourne, where it stayed for the next year. From July 1810 to May 1811 it was at Playden Barracks, then moved to join the Portsmouth area garrison, being quartered at Fareham, Titchfield, Havant, Emsworth and Westbourne.

=== Ireland and Bordeaux ===
The Interchange Act 1811 allowed English militia regiments to serve in Ireland (and vice versa) for two years. Lord Cranley informed the government that all of the 2nd RLM had volunteered to serve there except one sergeant, one corporal and 80 privates, who were sent to Bristol. The regiment 485 strong embarked from Portsmouth on 1 August under the command of Lt-Col Robert Frederick (eldest son of the original second-in-command) and after arrival in Dublin marched to Mullingar. The arrival of the militia relieved regiments of the King's German Legion for service in the Peninsular War.

The militia's duties included sending detachments to assist the revenue and police service. By the end of 1812 almost half the regiment was detached to Granard on this duty. The regiment continued to provide volunteers to the regulars, about 100 each year, who were replaced by recruits from a militia depot established on the Isle of Wight under the Hon Thomas Cranley Onslow (appointed colonel of the 2nd RLM after the resignation of his father in 1812), though there was criticism of the quality of the recruits received by the regiment. In May 1813 the regiment concentrated at Mullingar and marched to Dublin to await passage back to England, embarking on 30 June. In England it rejoined the depot and the recruiting parties operating across Surrey. The regiment was stationed at Woodbridge, Suffolk, until 4 September, when it moved to Chelmsford Barracks.

From November 1813 the militia were invited to volunteer for limited overseas service, primarily for garrison duties in Europe. Ten officers and 158 other ranks (ORs) of the 2nd RSM volunteered for this service, though a number changed their mind and transferred to the regular army instead (mainly to the 51st Foot). In the event the regiment supplied a detachment of 114 men for the 2nd Provisional Battalion, while four officers were posted to the 1st Provisional Bn. The 2nd Provisional Bn assembled at Chelmsford and marched to Portsmouth where the Militia Brigade was assembling, arriving on 5 March. The brigade embarked on 10–11 March 1814 and joined the Earl of Dalhousie's division that had occupied Bordeaux just as the war was ending. The brigade did not form part of the Army of Occupation after the abdication of Napoleon and returned to England in June.

The 2nd RSM remained at Chelmsford until it returned to Guildford to be disembodied on 24 June 1814. The parties of men from 2nd Provisional Bn were paid off as soon as they arrived at Portsmouth and Plymouth in July. Although many militia regiments were embodied again after Napoleon's return to power in 1815, leading to the short Waterloo Campaign, the 2nd RSM was not one of them, though it did recruit 'by beat of drum' to maintain its numbers

=== Long peace ===
Although officers continued to be commissioned into the militia during the long peace after the Battle of Waterloo, and ballots were still held until they were suspended by the Militia Act 1829, the regiments were rarely assembled for training. The permanent staffs of sergeants and drummers (who were occasionally used to maintain public order) were progressively reduced. The 2nd RSM was only called out for training in 1820, 1821, 1825 and 1831.

The militia order of precedence balloted for in the Napoleonic War remained in force until 1833. In that year King William IV drew the lots for individual regiments and the resulting list remained in force with minor amendments until the end of the militia. The regiments raised before the peace of 1763 took the first 47 places: both Surrey regiments were deemed to predate 1763 (even though the 2nd had disappeared between 1763 and 1797), and the 2nd RSM was allotted 11th place, the 1st RSM only 20th. Formally, the regiment became the 11th, or 2nd Royal Surrey Militia: most regiments paid little notice to the numbering, but the 2nd RSM did include the numeral in the title of its regimental history. The regiment's precedence and royal status were confirmed in 1855.

== 1852 reforms ==
The Militia was revived by the Militia Act 1852, enacted during a period of international tension. As before, units were raised and administered on a county basis, and filled by voluntary enlistment (although conscription by means of the militia ballot might be used if the counties failed to meet their quotas). Training was for 56 days on enlistment, then for 21–28 days per year, during which the men received full army pay. Under the Act, militia units could be embodied by Royal Proclamation for full-time home defence service in three circumstances:

1. 'Whenever a state of war exists between Her Majesty and any foreign power'.
2. 'In all cases of invasion or upon imminent danger thereof'.
3. 'In all cases of rebellion or insurrection'.

The quota set for the 2nd RSM was 990 men in 10 companies, with a permanent staff of 28. Most of the few remaining old sergeants of the permanent staff were pensioned off, and Col the Hon Thomas Cranley Onslow, who had been in command since 1812, retired and was succeeded by the Earl of Lovelace, with Viscount Cranley as his lieutenant-colonel (first appointed in 1850). The reorganised regiment completed recruiting to its full establishment on 10 December 1852. It was called out for its first 28 days' training in April 1853 (though almost 400 of the enrolled men failed to appear), for which 40 drill instructors were borrowed from the regular army garrison at Chatham. Drill parades were held at the Woodbridge Road cricket ground in Guildford. When the regiment was not assembled, the permanent staff were available to assist the civil authorities of Guildford in suppressing riots in the town. In 1854 the regiment began building a barracks in Guildford, close to the River Wey, for the permanent staff, armoury, etc..

=== Crimean War and after ===
War having broken out with Russia in 1854 and an expeditionary force sent to the Crimea, the militia began to be called out for home defence. The 2nd RSM carried out is annual training at Woodbridge Road in May 1854, when its new Regimental Colours were presented by Viscountess Cranley. The regiment was then embodied for service on 1 February 1855. However, a serious disturbance broke out on 28 March when all the men who had enlisted in 1852 and had completed their training requirement were fallen out, either to be sent home or to be re-attested to complete their five years' service: 160 re-attested, 260 declined. However, a revised War Office order arrived in the afternoon and the 260 men were ordered back to attend parade. By this time many were drunk and the 24 remaining men of the Grenadier Company had to be deployed with fixed bayonets across the entrance to the drill field before the 10-man guard was turned out from the barracks. These two small armed parties cleared the boisterous civilians and forced the men back into the drill ground. The confusion over the badly-drafted 1852 Act was cleared up, and the men were eventually allowed to take their discharge and go home. This left the 2nd RSM with only 394 effective men.

The regiment was trained hard, with two daily drills, the first always taken by the colonel. In the summer months there were frequent marches out to Merrow Downs or to Lord Lovelace's estate at Horsley Towers. Although the regiment had volunteered for service overseas, its offer was not accepted. However, 75 men and a number of officers volunteered to transfer to the regulars, followed by another 90 in 1856, bringing to total to 315 men and seven officers during the war. The 2nd RSM left Guildford on 13 February 1856 (having remained billeted there until an outbreak of smallpox was over) and went into the newly built North Camp at Aldershot. For drill purposes the regiment was assigned the 6th Brigade in the camp. However, the Crimean war was coming to an end, and the 2nd RSM marched back to Guildford to be disembodied on 12 June 1856.

After the disembodiment the 2nd RSM was not called out for training again until 1858, but the permanent staff continued to be periodically inspected and worked as recruiters for the regular army, raising 144 men in 1857 and 157 in 1858. Although a number of militia regiments were embodied to relieve regular units sent to fight in the Indian Mutiny, the 2nd RSM was not among them. In 1858 it did 20 days' training, during which a picket of 80 men was sent into Guildford to deal with a riot. Thereafter the regiment was called out annually for training, with the recruits undergoing 14–20 days' preliminary training. In 1864 the training was held at a tented camp erected on Whitmoor Common by the recruits to avoid another smallpox outbreak in Guildford. As an experiment in May 1867 the annual training was held at Aldershot in conjunction with the regular division stationed there. The 1st and 2nd RSM were both attached to 1st Brigade. The camp ended with a divisional field day and was considered a success, being repeated in subsequent years; in 1871, although the recruits were trained in May, the regiment participated in the extensive Autumn Manoeuvres conducted that year. In 1867 the Militia Reserve was created, consisting of present and former militiamen who undertook to serve overseas in case of war. In 1870 The Earl of Lovelace resigned the command after 17 years and became the regiment's Honorary Colonel and was succeeded as Lieutenant-Colonel Commandant (the rank of colonel in the militia having been abolished) by Lt-Col Charles Calvert, who died later that year and was succeeded by Major William Sharp.

== Cardwell reforms ==
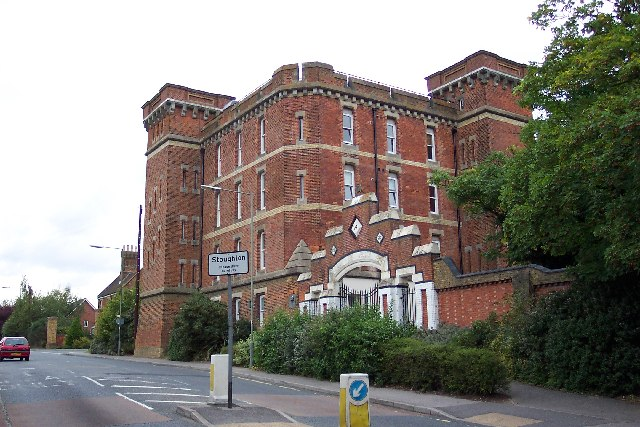
Stoughton Barracks, Guildford, now known as 'Cardwell's Keep'.

Under the 'Localisation of the Forces' scheme introduced by the Cardwell Reforms of 1872, militia regiments were brigaded with their local regular and Volunteer battalions – for the 2nd RSM this was with the two battalions of the 2nd (Queen's Royal) Regiment of Foot in Sub-District No 48 (County of Surrey) at Guildford. A planned second militia regiment for the sub-district, to be numbered the 4th Surrey, was never raised. The militia now came under the War Office rather than their county lords lieutenant. Around a third of the recruits and many young officers went on to join the regular army.

Although often referred to as brigades, the sub-districts were purely administrative organisations, but in a continuation of the Cardwell Reforms a mobilisation scheme began to appear in the Army List from December 1875. This assigned Regular and Militia units to places in an order of battle of corps, divisions and brigades for the 'Active Army', even though these formations were entirely theoretical, with no staff or services assigned. The 1st, 2nd and 3rd RSM were assigned to 2nd Brigade of 2nd Division, III Corps. The brigade would have mustered at Redhill in time of war.

The Militia Barracks built in 1854 had proved to be unhealthy and were now too small, so the 2nd RSM transferred to the new Stoughton Barracks built in 1876 as the depot for the Queen's.

== 3rd Battalion, Queen's (Royal West Surrey Regiment) ==
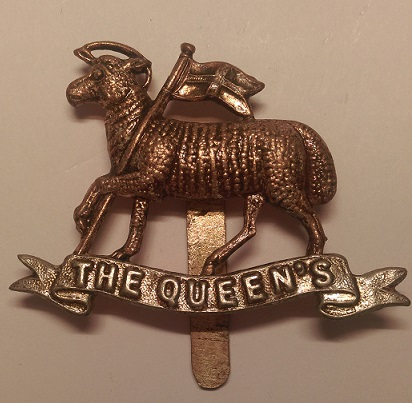
Cap badge of the Queen's Royal Regiment (West Surrey).

The Childers Reforms took Cardwell's reforms further, with the militia formally joining their linked regiments as their 3rd Battalions on 1 July 1881 (the 2nd RSM became 3rd Bn Queen's (Royal West Surrey Regiment)).

=== Second Boer War ===
After the disasters of Black Week at the start of the Second Boer War in December 1899, most of the regular army was sent to South Africa, and many militia units were embodied to replace them for home defence and to garrison certain overseas stations. The 3rd Queen's was embodied on 4 December 1899 and volunteered for overseas service. It embarked on 20 February 1900 with a strength of 24 officers and 515 ORs, under the command of Col Frederick Fairtlough. After disembarking at Cape Town on 27 March the battalion was sent to De Aar to occupy various outposts in the district. It was soon moved to Springfontein to defend points along about 350 miles (560 km) of the Lines of Communication at Deelfontein, Richmond Road, Victoria West Road, Krom River, Fraserburg Road and Kettering Siding, with headquarters (HQ) at Beaufort West. In August a detachment of 200 men under Maj Frederick Parsons was sent back to garrison De Aar, and the battalion's machine gun detachment moved to Vryburg for service on the armoured train running between Kimberley and Mafeking. In October the battalion was withdrawn and sent down to guard Green Point Camp, a major prisoner of war camp at Cape Town. When the Boers invaded Cape Colony, units of town guards were formed, and a battalion about 1800 strong was placed under Col Fairtlough, who in March 1901 was put in command of the Simon's Town district. In July the 3rd Queen's returned to Beaufort West, with detachments sent to Namaqualand and Touws River. On its arrival at Beaufort West the Boers were close by, so the companies with HQ were pushed on to De Aar to reinforce the blockhouse line and protect convoys passing through the district. Over the next few months the battalion was engaged in repelling Boer columns driven against the blockhouse line by British mounted columns. In September the Touws River garrison was alerted when Commandant Gideon Scheepers' commando threatened the station. Colonel Fairtlough was now invalided to Cape Town, and Lt-Col Wellington Shelton assumed command of the battalion. In November it was concentrated at De Aar apart from a detachment at Worcester. In December a detachment of four officers and 124 ORs escorted a convoy of 160 12-bullock waggons on a journey of 120 miles (190 km) to Prieska.

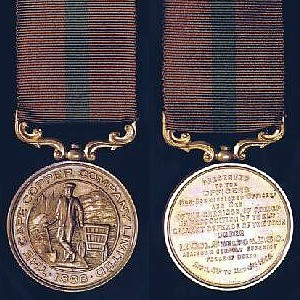
The medal awarded to the defenders of Okiep by the Cape Copper Company.

By March 1902 the battalion was preparing to leave for home after a two-year tour of duty. The main body, which since 9 February had been holding the blockhouse section between Victoria West and Beaufort West, moved down to Cape Town for embarkation on 4 March. The companies under Maj Parsons at Prieska were still cut off and living on half rations, and were not able to leave until later. However, Lt-Col Shelton and another detachment was operating with a column in Namaqualand, where Boers were seizing the copper mines. On 1 April Shelton was in command at the largest mine, at Okiep, when it was attacked by a large force under Jan Smuts. As well as his militiamen of the 3rd Queen's and 5th Royal Warwickshires, Shelton's 900-strong defence force included a large number of miners, both white and Coloured. A determined attack was driven off on 12 April and rifle fire went on all day, after which the Boers closely invested the town. On 1 May they unsuccessfully drove a train loaded with dynamite into the defences. However, Smuts had been called away to take part in the peace talks at Vereeniging. His men continued the siege until a relief force (including part of 4th Bn East Surreys, formerly the 3rd Royal Surrey Militia) arrived from Port Nolloth on 3 May. The Treaty of Vereeniging brought the war to an end on 31 May.

Even while the siege of Okiep continued, the 3rd Queen's had been formally disembodied on 1 April 1902. During the campaign the battalion had lost 12 ORs killed or died of wounds or sickness. It was awarded the Battle honour South Africa 1900–02 and the participants received the Queen's South Africa Medal with the clasp for 'Cape Colony', and the King's South Africa Medal with clasps '1901' and '1902'. Colonel Fairtlough was awarded the CMG and Lt-Col Shelton and Maj Parsons each received the DSO. The Cape Copper Company awarded its own Medal for the Defence of O'okiep to all the defenders, regardless of race or service. The officers and men of the 3rd Queen's who were present during the siege would have received this medal, even though it was unofficial and not allowed to be worn in uniform. The inscription on the medal read: 'PRESENTED TO THE OFFICERS NON-COMMISSIONED OFFICERS AND MEN OF THE GARRISON OF OOKIEP IN RECOGNITION OF THEIR GALLANT DEFENCE OF THE TOWN UNDER LT. COL. SHELTON. D.S.O. AGAINST A GREATLY SUPERIOR FORCE OF BOERS APRIL 4TH TO MAY 4TH 1902'.

== Special Reserve ==
After the Boer War, the future of the Militia was called into question. There were moves to reform the Auxiliary Forces (Militia, Yeomanry and Volunteers) to take their place in the six Army Corps proposed by the Secretary of State for War, St John Brodrick. However, little of Brodrick's scheme was carried out. Under the more sweeping Haldane Reforms of 1908, the Militia was replaced by the Special Reserve (SR), a semi-professional force whose role was to provide reinforcement drafts for regular units serving overseas in wartime, rather like the earlier Militia Reserve. The battalion became the 3rd (Reserve) Battalion, Queen's Royal Regiment (West Surrey), on 6 September 1908.

== World War I ==
=== 3rd (Reserve) Battalion ===
Four days after the outbreak of war on 4 August 1914 the battalion mobilised at Guildford under the command of Lt-Col A.G. Shaw, commanding officer since 23 October 1911, and moved to its war station at Chattenden in the Thames–Medway defences. The battalion was detailed for guard duties at magazines and vulnerable points around Belvedere, Lodge Hill, Strood and Chatham Dockyard. As well as its defence responsibilities, the battalion's role was to train and form drafts of reservists, special reservists, recruits and returning wounded for the regular battalions. The 1st Battalion served with the British Expeditionary Force (BEF) on the Western Front for the whole war. The 2nd Battalion also went to the Western Front after its arrival from South Africa, but it ended the war on the Italian Front. Thousands of reinforcements for these battalions would have passed through the 3rd Bn.

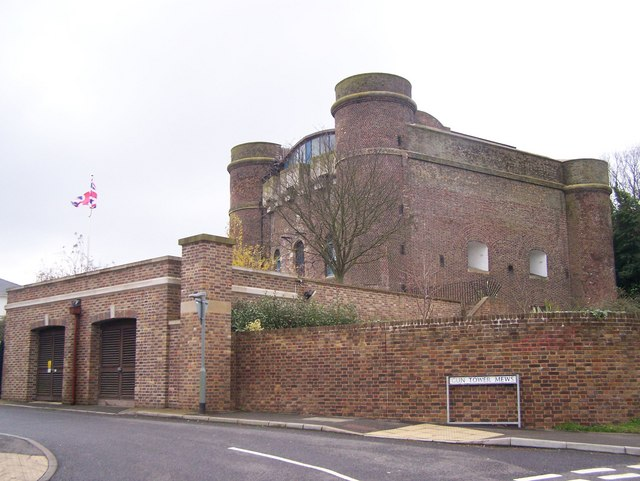
Fort Clarence, Rochester, 3rd (SR) Bn's HQ 1914–16.

The 3rd Bn had already equipped and sent out over 1000 reservists by November 1914 when it moved to Rochester. HQ and A Company were stationed at Fort Clarence, and a company at each of the other forts: Horsted, Borstal and Bridgewoods. Each company was composed of Regular and Special Reservists, with a few wounded and unfit men returned from the BEF, while the recruits were trained at Chatham Lines until, they were ready to be transferred to the service companies in the forts to pepare for drafting. It the latter part of 1915 the battalion also began supplying drafts to the 6th and 7th (Service) Bns composed of 'Kitchener's Army' volunteers, which were by then serving with the BEF, supplementing the work of the 9th (Reserve) Bn (see below). In February 1916 3rd Bn moved to Gore Court at Sittingbourne. It was now organised as A Company (unfit BEF men), B, C and D Service Companies (draft finding), and Nos 1, 2, 3 and 4 Training Companies still at Chatham Lines. It remained to the end of the war in the Sittingbourne Special Reserve Brigade.

During the war the battalion's honorary colonel, Col Frederick Fairtlough, CMG, came out of retirement to command the 8th (Service) Bn, Queen's, a Kitchener's Army unit, and was killed in action on 26 September 1915 at the Battle of Loos.

On 10 November 1915 3rd Bn was ordered to send a draft of 109 men to the new Machine Gun Training Centre at Grantham where they were to form the basis of a brigade machine-gun company of the new Machine Gun Corps for the divisions serving overseas. In addition, 10 men at a time were to undergo training at Grantham as battalion machine gunners. The order stated that 'Great care should be taken in the selection of men for training as machine gunners as only well educated and intelligent men are suitable for this work'.

After the war the 3rd Bn moved to Clipstone Camp in Nottinghamshire, where it was disembodied on 24 September 1919, when the remaining personnel were drafted to the 1st Bn. It had been commanded by Col Shaw throughout its service.

=== 9th (Reserve) Battalion ===
After Lord Kitchener issued his call for volunteers in August 1914, the battalions of the 1st, 2nd and 3rd New Armies ('K1', 'K2' and 'K3' of 'Kitchener's Army') were quickly formed at the regimental depots. The SR battalions also swelled with new recruits and were soon well above their establishment strength. On 8 October 1914 each SR battalion was ordered to use the surplus to form a service battalion of the 4th New Army ('K4'). Accordingly the 3rd Reserve Bn formed the 9th Reserve Bn, Queen's at Gravesend. It was to be part of 93rd Brigade in 31st Division and began training for active service, moving to Wrotham in March 1915. On 10 April 1915 the War Office decided to convert the K4 units into 2nd Reserve battalions to train reinforcement drafts for the K1–K3 battalions, in the same way that the SR did for the regular battalions; 93rd Brigade became 5th Reserve Brigade. In May 1915 9th (Reserve) Bn moved to Colchester and in September to Shoreham-by-Sea. On 1 September 1916 the 2nd Reserve battalions were transferred to the Training Reserve (TR) and the battalion was amalgamated with 11th (R) Bn, East Surreys, to form 21st Training Reserve Bn, though the training staff retained their regimental badges. This was in turn designated 241st (Infantry) Bn, Training Reserve, on 4 July 1917.

By October 1917 the battalion had joined 207th Bde in 69th Division at Clipstone Camp, where on 24 October it was transferred to the Rifle Brigade as 52nd (Graduated) Battalion. On 22 February 1918 it moved to 202nd Bde in 67th Division at Colchester, where it remained for the rest of the war. Early in 1919 it was decided to send the graduated training battalions to the occupation force in Germany (the British Army of the Rhine) to take the place of fighting battalions that were being demobilised. On 8 February 52nd (G) Bn Rifle Brigade was converted into a service battalion under Lt-Col E.P.A. Riddell and on 1 March it crossed to Dunkirk and then went by train to Worringen, a few miles north of Cologne. Here it joined 5th Bde of 2nd Division, but on 7 April it moved by train to Konigshoven, north of Düren, where together with 51st and 53rd (S) Bns, Rifle Brigade, it constituted 3rd (Light) Bde of the Light Division (as 2nd Division had been redesignated). The battalion settled down to peacetime training and sport. However, on 18 June the Light Division began moving to the Cologne area in case the German delegates rejected the Treaty of Versailles and Allied troops were ordered to occupy the Ruhr. On 21 June 52nd (S) Bn reached Sülz. However, the treaty was signed on 28 June and no advance across the Rhine was required. The Light Division closed down in November 1919 and 52nd (S) Bn moved to 2nd Rhine Bde. The battalion was finally disbanded in BAOR on 4 March 1920.

=== Postwar ===
The SR resumed its old title of Militia in 1921 but like most militia battalions the 3rd Queen's remained in abeyance after World War I. By the outbreak of World War II in 1939, only one officer (commissioned in 1916) remained listed for the battalion. The Militia was formally disbanded in April 1953.

== Commanders ==
The following officers commanded the regiment as Colonel or (after the 1852 reforms) as Lieutenant-Colonel Commandant:

- Col Hon Thomas Onslow, appointed 2 January 1797, Viscount Cranley from 1801, resigned 13 March 1812 (later 2nd Earl of Onslow)
- Col Hon Thomas Cranley Onslow, former captain, 3rd Foot Guards, appointed 15 March 1812, resigned 14 August 1852
- Col William King-Noel, 1st Earl of Lovelace, appointed 14 August 1852, resigned 11 April 1870
- Lt-Col Charles Calvert, former captain, 2nd Dragoon Guards (Queen's Bays), appointed 11 April 1870, died 29 July 1870
- Lt-Col William James, promoted 29 November 1870
- Lt-Col Edward Hartnell, promoted 24 March 1880
- Lt-Col John Davis, promoted 14 February 1884
- Lt-Col Frederick Fairtlough, promoted 23 October 1895
- Lt-Col Frederick Parsons, DSO, promoted 23 October 1905
- Lt-Col A.G. Shaw, promoted 23 October 1911
- Lt-Col J.K.N.V. Bunbury, appointed 8 February 1918

The following served as Honorary Colonel:

- Col William, 1st Earl of Lovelace, appointed 11 April 1870, died 29 December 1893
- Col John Davis, appointed 5 October 1895
- Col Frederick Fairtlough, CMG, appointed 13 December 1904, killed in action at Loos 26 September 1915
- Lt-Col Alan Percy, 8th Duke of Northumberland, appointed 1 October 1918.

== Uniforms and insignia ==
As a Royal regiment, the uniform was red with blue facings. The badge was the star of the Order of the Garter, awarded to the regiment by the Duke of York at a royal review at Ashford in 1803. About 1810 the officers' shoulder-belt plate had the royal cipher 'GR' and crown within a garter inscribed 'SURREY 2ND REGT. MILITIA'. About 1830 the buttons had the garter star within a garter inscribed 'ROYAL II SURREY'. This was later replaced by the numeral 'II' within the garter inscribed 'SECOND ROYAL SURREY REGT.', surmounted with the royal crest (the lion and crown) with a spray of oak leaves one either side. New badges were authorised for militia regiments in 1860: the lion and crown, with an oak wreath for the cap, or an oak leaf and crown on the forage cap. The shako plate had the star authorised in 1803, with 'II' in the centre; from 1860 the Roman numeral was replaced by the royal crest. In 1869 the 2nd RLM abandoned the much-disliked 1860 forage cap badge and reverted to the 1803 star.

Of the new colours presented by Viscountess Cranley on 16 May 1854, the Queen's Colour was the Union Flag with a crown and scroll reading 'II ROYAL SURREY MILITA' in the centre, while the regimental colour was blue with 'II' on the union flag in the canton. The design in the centre of the regimental colour was a red disc with the ornate cipher 'VR' surrounded by the words 'ROYAL SURREY MILITIA', surrounded by a wreath of roses, thistles and shamrocks with a crown above.

After 1881 the battalion used the insignia of the Queen's, including the 'Paschal Lamb' badge.

== Memorials ==
There is a marble memorial plaque in the Chapel of the Queen's Royal Regiment at Holy Trinity Church, Guildford, to the 12 men of the battalion who died during the Second Boer War. The monument in the Chapel to the 11,000 men of the Queen's Regiment who died in World War I and World War II is a large wooden panel with a central niche surmounted by the badge of the Paschal Lamb. Above the panel there is a stained glass window to 3rd Battalion, depicting the Victory of the Lamb, from the Ghent Altarpiece by Jan van Eyck.

== See also ==
- Surrey Militia
- Surrey Trained Bands
- 1st Royal Surrey Militia
- Queen's (Royal West Surrey Regiment)

== Notes ==
- W.Y. Baldry, 'Order of Precedence of Militia Regiments', Journal of the Society for Army Historical Research, Vol 15, No 57 (Spring 1936), pp. 5–16.
- Maj A.F. Becke,History of the Great War: Order of Battle of Divisions, Part 2b: The 2nd-Line Territorial Force Divisions (57th–69th), with the Home-Service Divisions (71st–73rd) and 74th and 75th Divisions, London: HM Stationery Office, 1937/Uckfield: Naval & Military Press, 2007, ISBN 1-847347-39-8.
- Maj A.F. Becke,History of the Great War: Order of Battle of Divisions, Part 3b: New Army Divisions (30–41) and 63rd (R.N.) Division, London: HM Stationery Office, 1939/Uckfield: Naval & Military Press, 2007, ISBN 1-847347-41-X.
- Steve Brown, 'Home Guard: The Forces to Meet the Expected French Invasion/1 September 1805' at The Napoleon Series (archived at the Wayback Machine).
- Burke's Peerage, Baronetage and Knightage, 100th Edn, London, 1953.
- Capt John Davis, Historical Records of the Second Royal Surrey or Eleventh Regiment of Militia, London: Marcus Ward, 1877.
- Col John K. Dunlop, The Development of the British Army 1899–1914, London: Methuen, 1938.
- Brig-Gen Sir James E. Edmonds, History of the Great War: Military Operations, France and Belgium, 1915, Vol II, London: Macmillan, 1928/Imperial War Museum & Battery Press, 1995, ISBN 0-89839-219-5/Uckfield: Naval & Military Press, 2009, ISBN 978-1-84574-719-0.
- J.B.M. Frederick, Lineage Book of British Land Forces 1660–1978, Vol I, Wakefield: Microform Academic, 1984, ISBN 1-85117-007-3.
- Lt-Col James Moncrieff Grierson (Col Peter S. Walton, ed.), Scarlet into Khaki: The British Army on the Eve of the Boer War, London: Sampson Low, 1899/London: Greenhill, 1988, ISBN 0-947898-81-6.
- H.G. Hart, The New Annual Army List, and Militia List (various dates from 1840).
- Col George Jackson Hay, An Epitomized History of the Militia (The Constitutional Force), London:United Service Gazette, 1905/Ray Westlake Military Books, 1987 Archived 11 May 2021 at the Wayback Machine, ISBN 0-9508530-7-0.
- Brig E.A. James, British Regiments 1914–18, London: Samson Books, 1978/Uckfield: Naval & Military Press, 2001, ISBN 978-1-84342-197-9.
- Rayne Kruger, Goodbye Dolly Gray, London: Cassell 1959/Pan 1974, ISBN 0-330-23861-2.
- Sir Charles Oman,A History of the Peninsular War, Vol VII, August 1813 to April 14, 1814, Oxford: Clarendon Press, 1930/London: Greenhill Books, 1997, ISBN 1-85367-227-0.
- H.G. Parkyn, 'English Militia Regiments 1757–1935: Their Badges and Buttons', Journal of the Society for Army Historical Research, Vol 15, No 60 (Winter 1936), pp. 216–248.
- Richard A. Rinaldi, The Original British Army of the Rhine, 2006.
- Brig-Gen William W. Seymour, The History of the Rifle Brigade in the War of 1914–1918, Vol II, January 1917–June 1919, London: The Rifle Brigade Club, 1936/Uckfield: Naval & Military Press, 2003, ISBN 978-1-847346-98-8
- Edward M. Spiers, The Army and Society 1815–1914, London: Longmans, 1980, ISBN 0-582-48565-7.
- Edward M. Spiers, The Late Victorian Army 1868–1902, Manchester: Manchester University Press, 1992/Sandpiper Books, 1999, ISBN 0-7190-2659-8.
- Instructions Issued by the War Office During November 1915, London: HM Stationery Office.
- J.R. Western The English Militia in the Eighteenth Century: The Story of a Political Issue 1660–1802, London: Routledge & Kegan Paul, 1965.
- Col H.C. Wylly, History of the Queen's Royal (West Surrey) Regiment in the Great War, Aldershot: Gale & Polden, 1925/Uckfield, Naval & Military Press, 2003, ISBN 978-1-84342539-7.

== External sources ==
- Chris Baker, The Long, Long Trail
- Commonwealth War Graves Commission records
- Imperial War Museum
- Imperial War Museum, War Memorials Register
- T.F. Mills, Land Forces of Britain, the Empire and Commonwealth – Regiments.org (archive site)
- David Plant, British Civil Wars, Commonwealth & Protectorate, 1638–1660 (The BCW Project).
- Queen's Royal Surreys
- War Memorials Online
