= 3rd Royal Surrey Militia =

Auxiliary unit of the British Army

3rd Royal Surrey Militia 4th Battalion, East Surrey Regiment
- Active: 26 March 1853–1 April 1953
- Country: United Kingdom
- Branch: Militia/Special Reserve
- Role: Infantry
- Garrison/HQ: The Barracks, Kingston upon Thames
- Engagements: Second Boer War

Commanders
- Notable commanders: Lt-Col Thomas-Chaloner Bisse-Challoner

The 3rd Royal Surrey Militia, later the 4th Battalion, East Surrey Regiment was an auxiliary (Note: It is incorrect to describe the British Militia as 'irregular': throughout their history they were equipped and trained exactly like the line regiments of the regular army, and once embodied in time of war they were fulltime professional soldiers for the duration of their enlistment.) regiment raised 1853 in Surrey in the Home counties of England. The regiment's role was to serve in home defence, but it saw active service during the Second Boer War, and trained thousands of reinforcements during World War I, one of its new officers winning a Victoria Cross. After a shadowy postwar existence the battalion was formally disbanded in 1953.

== Background ==
The universal obligation to military service in the Shire levy was long established in England and its legal basis was updated by two acts of 1557 (4 & 5 Ph. & M. cc. 2 and 3), which placed selected men, the 'trained bands', under the command of Lords Lieutenant appointed by the monarch. This is seen as the starting date for the organised county militia in England. The Surrey Trained Bands formed part of the army at Tilbury during the Armada campaign of 1588, and some elements saw active service during the English Civil War. The Militia was re-established in 1661 after the Restoration of the Monarchy, and was popularly seen as the 'Constitutional Force' in contrast to the 'Standing Army' that was tainted by association with the New Model Army that had supported the military dictatorship of the Protectorate. However, the Militia declined in the years after the Peace of Utrecht in 1713.

Under threat of French invasion during the Seven Years' War a series of Militia Acts from 1757 reorganised the county militia regiments, the men being conscripted by means of parish ballots (paid substitutes were permitted) to serve for three years. Surrey's regiment was formed at Richmond-upon-Thames on 18 April 1759, and served until it was disembodied at the end of the war in 1762. The militia was called out again during the War of American Independence from 1778 to 1783 while the country was threatened with invasion by the Americans' allies, France and Spain. In 1780 the Surrey Militia was deployed on the streets of London against the Gordon Rioters. The French Revolutionary Wars and Napoleonic Wars from 1792 to 1815 saw a new phase for the English militia: they were embodied for a whole generation, and became regiments of full-time professional soldiers (though restricted to service within the British Isles), which the regular army increasingly saw as a prime source of recruits. They served in coast defences, manning garrisons, guarding prisoners of war, and for internal security.

In 1797, to release regulars for overseas service, the strength of the militia was increased by the creation of the Supplementary Militia, also raised by means of the ballot. The intention was to form two supplementary regiments in Surrey. Surrey has been described as one of the 'black spots' in recruitment for the Supplementary Militia, so although the 1st Surrey Supplementary Militia was successfully raised (and became the permanent 2nd Surrey Militia the following year) the 2nd regiment (intended to be the 3rd Surrey Militia) never reached establishment and was disbanded.

The two regiments of Surrey Militia received the designation 'Royal' in 1804. Volunteers from the regiments saw service in Ireland and in France at the end of the war. But after the Battle of Waterloo in 1815 the militia was allowed to decline, and training was suspended after 1831.

== 3rd Royal Surrey Militia ==
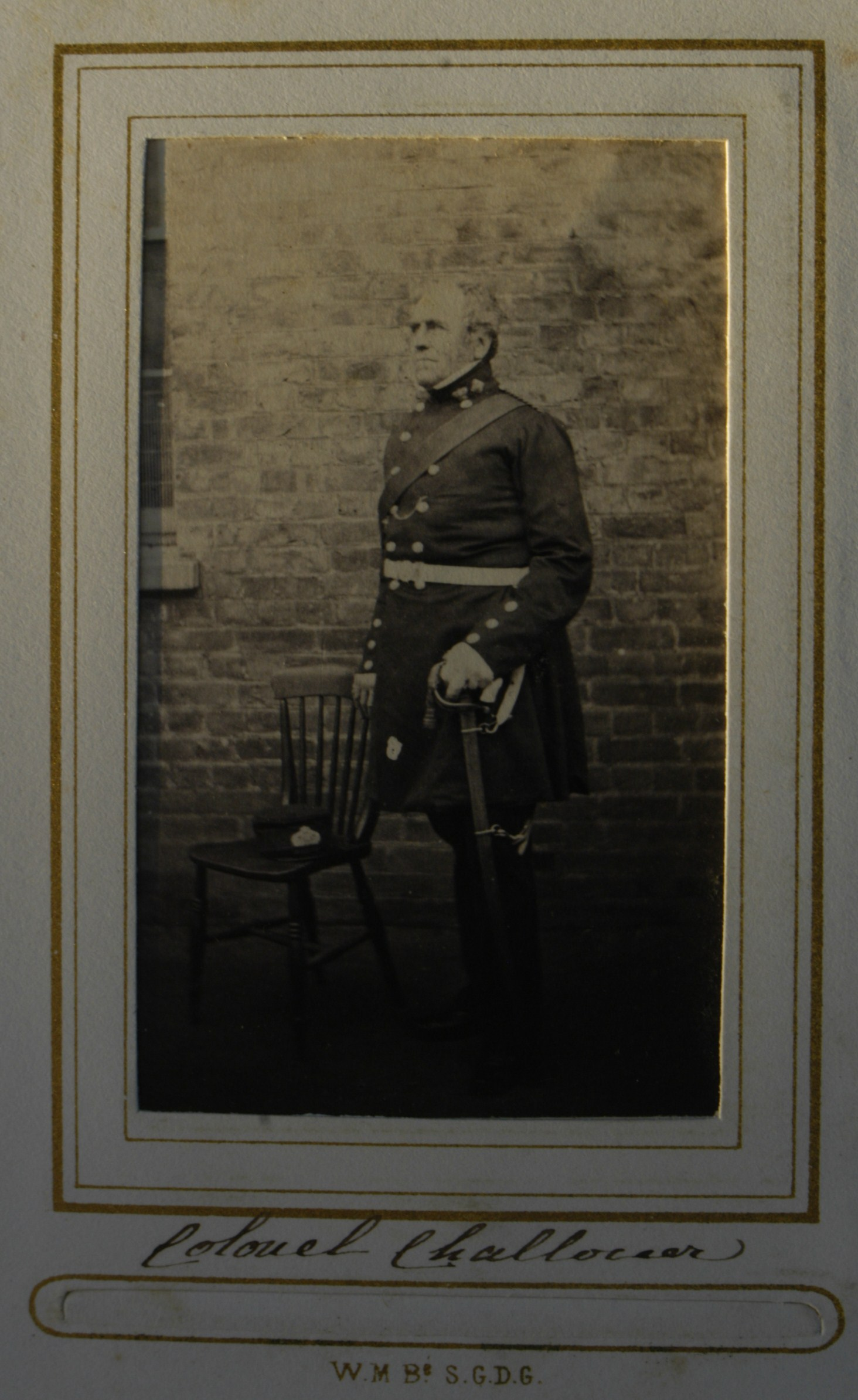
Lt-Col Bisse-Chaloner in the uniform of the 3rd Royal Surrey Militia.

The Militia of the United Kingdom was revived by the Militia Act 1852, enacted during a period of international tension. As before, units were raised and administered on a county basis, and filled by voluntary enlistment (although conscription by means of the militia ballot might be used if the counties failed to meet their quotas). Training was for 56 days on enlistment, then for 21–28 days per year, during which the men received full army pay. Under the Act, militia units could be embodied by Royal Proclamation for full-time home defence service in three circumstances:

1. 'Whenever a state of war exists between Her Majesty and any foreign power'.
2. 'In all cases of invasion or upon imminent danger thereof'.
3. 'In all cases of rebellion or insurrection'.

A new 3rd Royal Surrey Militia (3rd RSM) was formed at Kingston upon Thames on 26 March 1853 under the command of Thomas-Chaloner Bisse-Challoner, a Surrey landowner and former officer in the 1st Dragoon Guards.

War having broken out with Russia in 1854 and an expeditionary force sent to the Crimea, the militia began to be called out for home defence. The 1st and 2nd RSM were both embodied, but the newly raised 3rd RSM was not utilised at this time. Thereafter the regiments were called out for their annual training. In the later 1860s this began to be held at Aldershot in conjunction with the regular division stationed there. In 1871 the militia training was combined with that year's extensive Autumn Manoeuvres, and all three Surrey regiments were involved. The Militia Reserve introduced in 1867 consisted of present and former militiamen who undertook to serve overseas in case of war.

=== Cardwell reforms ===
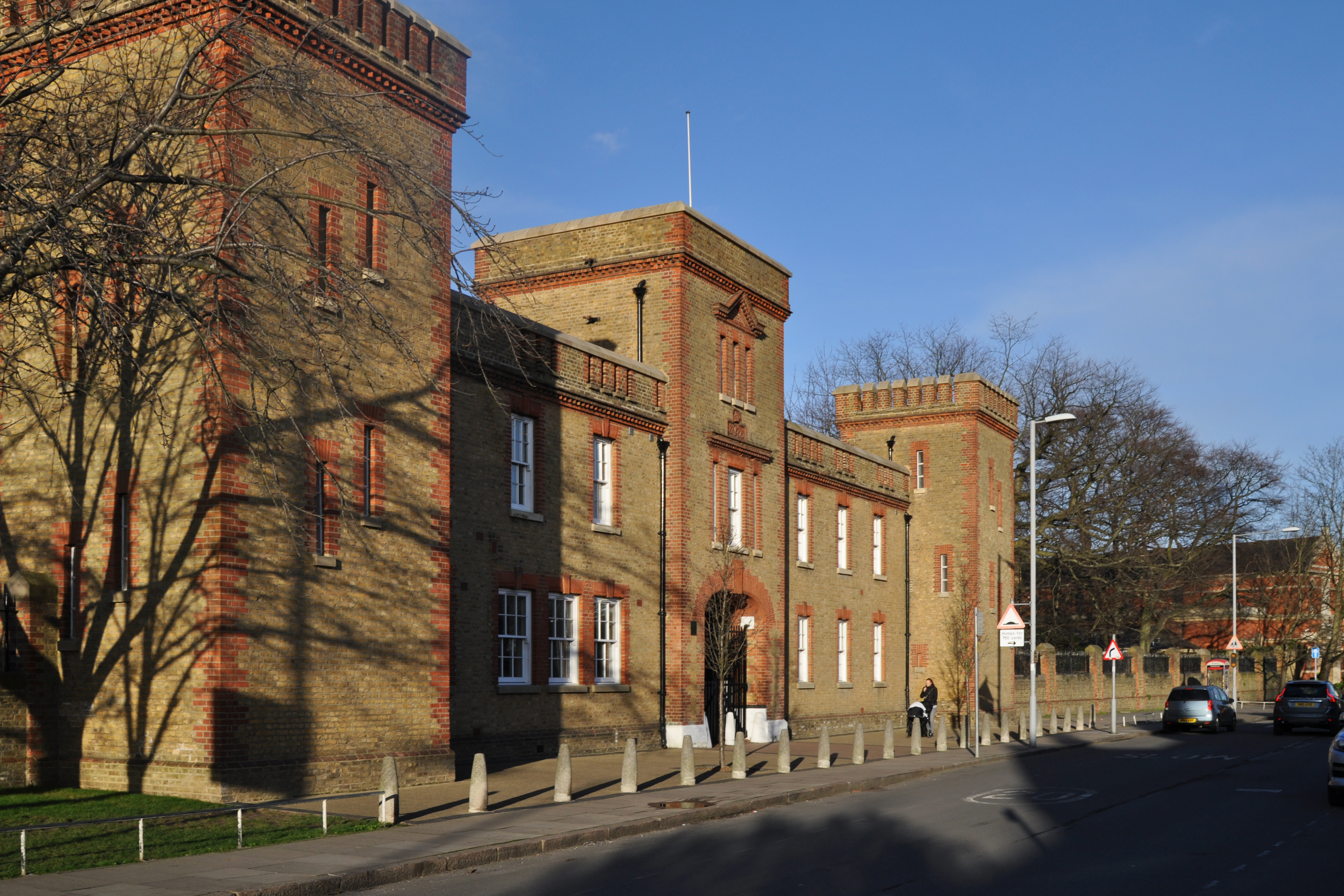
'The Keep', Kingston Barracks.

Under the 'Localisation of the Forces' scheme introduced by the Cardwell Reforms of 1872, militia regiments were brigaded with their local regular and Volunteer battalions – for the 1st and 3rd RSM this was with the 31st (Huntingdonshire) and 70th (Surrey) Regiments of Foot in Sub-District No 47 (County of Surrey) with a shared depot at Kingston. The Barracks, Kingston upon Thames, was built for the brigade depot in 1874–5. The Militia now came under the War Office rather than their county lords lieutenant.

Although often referred to as brigades, the sub-districts were purely administrative organisations, but in a continuation of the Cardwell Reforms a mobilisation scheme began to appear in the Army List from December 1875. This assigned regular and militia units to places in an order of battle of corps, divisions and brigades for the 'Active Army', even though these formations were entirely theoretical, with no staff or services assigned. The 1st, 2nd and 3rd RSM were assigned to 2nd Brigade of 2nd Division, III Corps. The brigade would have mustered at Redhill in time of war.

== 4th Battalion, East Surrey Regiment ==
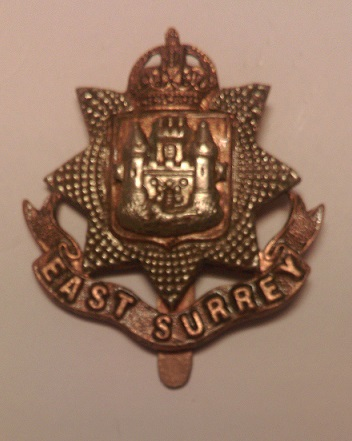
Cap badge of the East Surrey Regiment.

The Childers Reforms of 1881 took Cardwell's reforms further, with the linked regiments becoming two-battalion regiments and the militia formally joining. The 31st and 70th Foot became the 1st and 2nd Battalions of the East Surrey Regiment and the 1st and 3rd RSM became the 3rd and 4th Battalions on 1 July 1881 (the 2nd RSM became 3rd Bn Queen's Royal Regiment (West Surrey)). Militia battalions now had a large cadre of permanent staff (about 30). Around a third of the recruits and many young officers went on to join the Regular Army.

=== Second Boer War ===
After the disasters of Black Week at the start of the Second Boer War in December 1899, most of the Regular Army was sent to South Africa, and many militia units were embodied to replace them for home defence and to garrison certain overseas stations. The 4th East Surreys was embodied on 4 December 1899 and disembodied on 12 July 1901 It was embodied again on 24 February 1902 and volunteered for overseas service.

The battalion embarked for South Africa with a strength of 21 officers and 637 other ranks, under the command of Lt-Col Ernest Sulivan, a retired regular major. On arrival in South Africa on 10 April half the battalion went to the Sterkstroom district for blockhouse duty, while the remainder sailed up the coast to land at Port Nolloth. Here it joined the Namaqualand Field Force, which was dealing with an incursion of Boers into the copper mining district. Together with a company of Cape Volunteers the 4th East Surreys made a forced march through an enemy-held district to secure an important railway viaduct at Klipfontein, where it arrived on 20 April. The column then moved out on 28 April to attack a position at Steinkopf, where the Boers were strongly positioned on rugged Kopjes over a front of at least 2.5 miles (4.0 km). The engagement lasted all day, with the Surreys losing 4 killed, 4 wounded, and 8 prisoners. Next day the Boers had gone, and the column pushed on to relieve Okiep, where a garrison including a detachment of the 3rd Queen's (Royal West Surrey Regiment) (the former 2nd RSM) and a large number of miners, both white and Coloured, had been besieged for a month. The 4th East Surreys moved into Okiep on 13 May. The Treaty of Vereeniging brought the war to an end on 31 May and the Namaqualand Field Force was broken up. The half battalion then returned to Cape Town where it guarded Prisoner-of-war camps at Greens Point and Simon's Town. After returning home the battalion was disembodied on 25 September 1902.

During its service in South Africa the battalion had lost 22 other ranks (ORs) killed or died from disease. It was awarded the Battle Honour South Africa 1902 and the participants received the Queen's South Africa Medal with the clasps for 'Cape Colony' and 'South Africa 1902'.

== Special Reserve ==
After the Boer War, the future of the militia was called into question. There were moves to reform the Auxiliary Forces (Militia, Yeomanry and Volunteers) to take their place in the six Army Corps proposed by the Secretary of State for War, St John Brodrick. However, little of Brodrick's scheme was carried out.

Under the more sweeping Haldane Reforms of 1908, the Militia was replaced by the Special Reserve (SR), a semi-professional force whose role was to provide reinforcement drafts for regular units serving overseas in wartime, rather like the earlier Militia Reserve. The battalion became the 4th (Extra Reserve) Battalion, East Surrey Regiment, on 6 September 1908.

== World War I ==
=== 4th (Extra Reserve) Battalion ===
The battalion had assembled at Kingston on 3 August 1914 for its annual training under the command of Lt-Col R.F. Peel, a retired regular captain who had been commanding officer since 2 March 1913. War was declared the next day and the battalion was ordered to mobilise. It then proceeded to its war station at Plymouth on 9 August, where after a week in billets it took over the South Raglan Barracks from a regular unit proceeding overseas to join the British Expeditionary Force (BEF). 4th (ER) Battalion furnished garrisons for Tregantle Fort and other forts, and guarded wireless and cable stations along the south coast. As well as its defence responsibilities, the battalion's role was to train and form drafts of reservists, special reservists, recruits and returning wounded for the regular battalions: the 1st Bn served with the BEF on the Western Front for the whole war; the 2nd Bn also went to the Western Front after its arrival from India, but it spent most of the war at Salonika. During September 1914 the battalion received large numbers of recruits responding and in October the SR battalions were ordered to use their surplus to form service battalions. 4th (ER) Battalion provided large drafts to form 10th and 11th Battalions' (see below), leaving it with a strength of about 1500 men. It also received large numbers of young officers from the Officers' Training Corps. Colonel Ernest Sulivan returned from retirement, initially as a company commander.

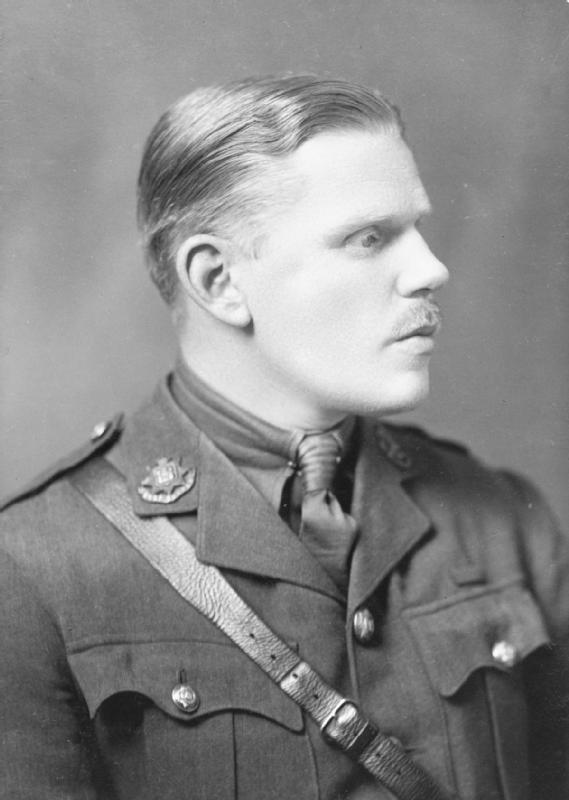
2/Lt Benjamin Geary, 4th East Surreys, attached to 1st East Surreys

The battalion sent out its first reinforcement draft (250 ORs for the 2nd Bn) in February 1915, and supplied 34 officers and 1131 ORs to the two Regular battalions in the first year of the war. Among the new officers commissioned into the Special Reserve was Benjamin Handley Geary who was sent from 4th Bn to join 1st Bn as a reinforcement. (Note: Commissioned into 4th Bn 15 August 1914, sent to France 24 September 1914.) He won a Victoria Cross (VC) in the fighting at Hill 60 on 20–21 April 1915.

In April 1915 the battalion moved to Saltash in Cornwall, still part of the Plymouth Garrison. At the end of September 1917 it moved to Felixstowe in Suffolk, where it was distributed across a wide area of the Harwich Garrison. The demobilisation orde for the battalion was received on 9 November 1918, two days before the Armistice with Germany came into effect. By then the battalion had sent 4732 ORs to the fighting battalions of the East Surreys and other units of the expeditionary forces. It returned to Kingston in January 1919, where demobilisation was completed by 25 May.

=== 11th (Reserve) Battalion ===
After Lord Kitchener issued his call for volunteers in August 1914, the battalions of the 1st, 2nd and 3rd New Armies ('K1', 'K2' and 'K3' of 'Kitchener's Army') were quickly formed at the regimental depots. The SR battalions also swelled with new recruits and were soon well above their establishment strength. On 8 October 1914 each SR battalion was ordered to use the surplus to form a service battalion of the 4th New Army ('K4'). Accordingly, the 4th (ER) Bn formed the 11th (Service) Battalion of the East Surreys at Devonport in the Plymouth defences on 1 November 1914. The men (750 ORs) were drawn from the excess personnel of the 4th (ER) Bn. Lieutenant-Col E.F. Sulivan temporarily commanded the battalion until he took over the 10th Bn on 18 November.; he was succeeded by Lt-Col C.G. Carnegy, MVO, from the Indian Army. In mid-December the battalion moved to Dartmouth, where it continued training for service with 100th Brigade of 33rd Division. On 10 April 1915 the War Office decided to convert the K4 battalions into 2nd Reserve units, to provide drafts for the K1–K3 battalions in the same way that the SR was doing for the Regular battalions. The battalion became 11th (Reserve) Bn, East Surreys, and shortly afterwards it moved to Colchester, where it joined 93rd Bde, which became 5th Reserve Bde. About 15 September the brigade moved to Shoreham-by-Sea, where 11th (R) Bn carried on producing drafts for the East Surreys battalions overseas. On 1 September 1916 the 2nd Reserve battalions were transferred to the Training Reserve (TR) and the battalion was amalgamated with 9th (R) Bn, Queen's to form 21st Training Reserve Battalion, though the training staff retained their regimental badges. This was in turn designated 241st (Infantry) Bn, Training Reserve, on 4 July 1917. On 24 October 1917 it was transferred to the Rifle Brigade as 52nd (Graduated) Bn. After the war it was converted into a service battalion on 8 February 1919 and sent to join the British Army of the Rhine, where it was disbanded on 4 March 1920.

=== Postwar ===
The SR resumed its old title of Militia in 1921 but like most militia battalions the 3rd East Surreys remained in abeyance after World War I. By the outbreak of World War II in 1939, no officers remained listed for the battalion. The Militia was formally disbanded in April 1953.

== Commanders ==
The following officers commanded the regiment:

- Lt-Col Commandant Thomas-Chaloner Bisse-Challoner, former lieutenant, 1st Dragoon Guards, appointed 26 March 1853
- Lt-Col Commandant Thomas Terry, former lieutenant, 15th Hussars, promoted 2 November 1867
- Lt-Col Commandant Miles Stringer, former lieutenant, 6th (Inniskilling) Dragoons, promoted 15 May 1872
- Lt-Col Commandant James Le Geyt Daniell, promoted 14 December 1881, retired 27 October 1892
- Lt-Col Bernard G. Haines, former lieutenant, 18th Foot, appointed 31 October 1894, retired 31 December 1901
- Lt-Col Ernest Sullivan, former major, Hampshire Regiment, appointed 1 January 1902
- Lt-Col Bertie Garnett, promoted 2 March 1909, retired 2 March 1913 (reappointed as captain of an entrenching company with the BEF)
- Lt-Col Robert Peel, former captain in the regulars, promoted 2 March 1913

The following served as Honorary Colonel:

- T.C.B. Challoner, former CO, appointed 2 November 1867, died 26 July 1872
- James Le Geyt Daniell, former CO, appointed 8 October 1892, reappointed to SR battalion 6 September 1908

== Uniforms and insignia ==
When the 3rd RSM was raised in 1853 it wore the old style uniform of coatee and Albert shako, but in 1857 the more modern tunic and smaller felt shako were issued. As a Royal regiment the facings on the scarlet uniform were blue, but these changed to white when the regiment became part of the East Surreys. The badge was the star of the Order of the Garter (awarded to the 2nd RSM in 1803) within an oak wreath. The buttons had the Royal cypher 'VR' within a crowned garter inscribed 'Third Royal Surrey'. The officers' waistbelt plate of 1855–81 had the Royal cypher and crown within a circle inscribed '3rd Royal Surrey Militia'. The officers had 'a very handsome Garter Star' as the silver embroidered ornament on the skirts of the short-lived coatee. The officers' embroidered Forage cap badge of 1874–81 had the numeral 'III" between the letters 'RS' on one side, reversed on the other, the whole within a crowned oak wreath, while the men's brass badge had the garter star within a garter inscribed 'Third Royal Surrey Militia'. After 1881 the battalion adopted the uniforms and insignia of the East Surreys.

== Memorials ==
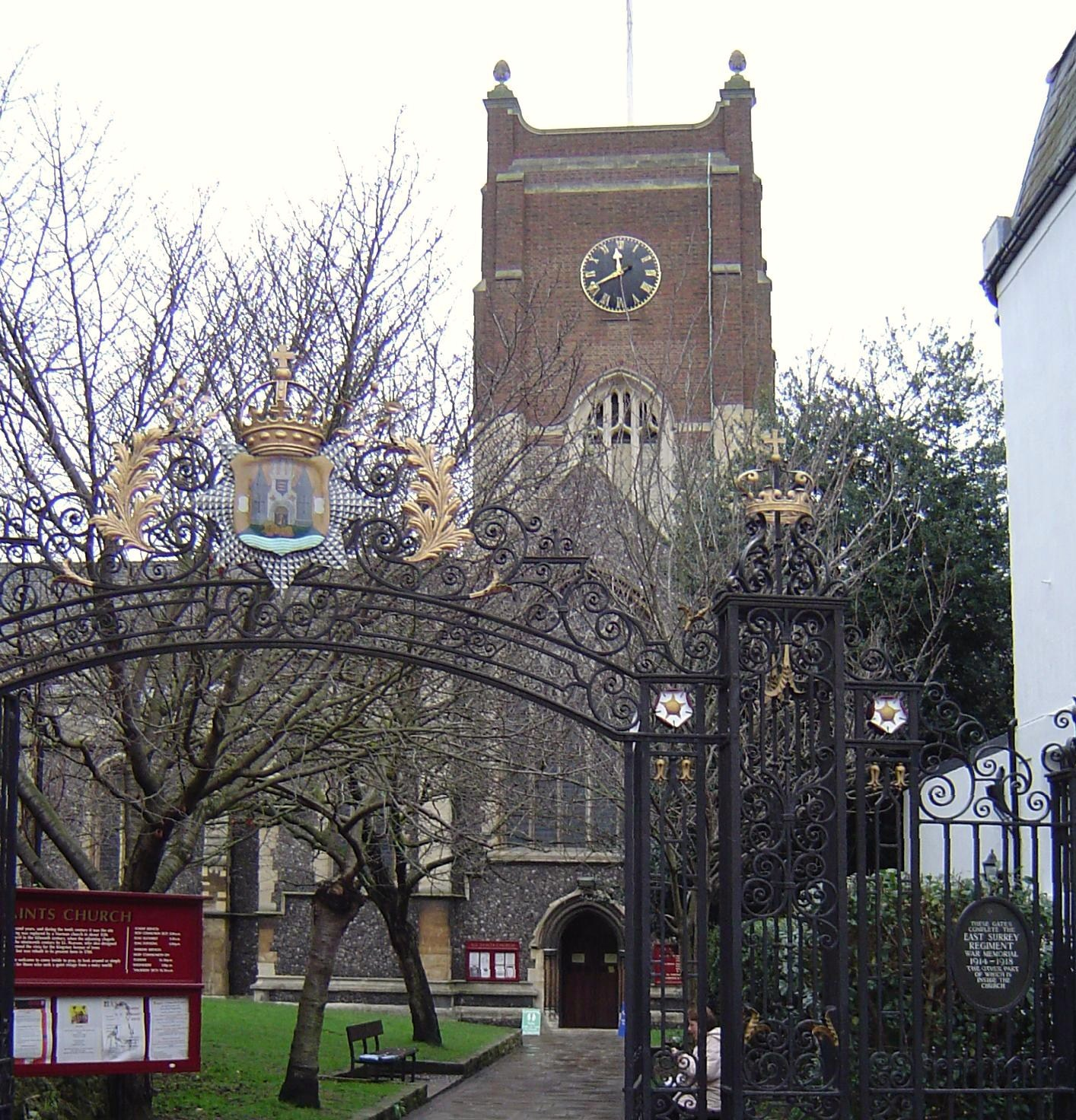
East Surrey Regiment Memorial Gateway to All Saints Churchyard, Kingston upon Thames

There is a marble memorial plaque in All Saints Church, Kingston upon Thames, to the 22 men of the battalion who died during the Second Boer War. There is also a memorial window and plaque in Kingston Library to these men. The East Surrey Regiment's 1914-18 memorial gates into All Saint's Churchyard from Kingston Market Place were donated by the 4th Battalion.

== See also ==
- Surrey Militia
- Surrey Trained Bands
- 1st Royal Surrey Militia
- 2nd Royal Surrey Militia
- East Surrey Regiment
