= Surrey Trained Bands =

Auxiliary military force in Surrey

- Active: 1572–1662
- Country: England
- Branch: Trained Bands
- Role: Infantry and Cavalry
- Size: 4 Regiments of Foot, 1 Regiment of Horse
- Engagements: Siege of Portsmouth; Battle of Worcester

Commanders
- Notable commanders: Sir Richard Onslow

The Surrey Trained Bands were a part-time military force in Surrey in the Home counties of England from 1558 until they were reconstituted as the Surrey Militia in 1662. They were periodically embodied for home defence, for example in the army mustered at Tilbury during the Armada Campaign of 1588, and they saw some active service during the English Civil War.

== Origin ==
The universal obligation to military service in the Shire levy was long established in England and its legal basis was updated by two acts of 1557 covering musters (4 & 5 Ph. & M. c. 3) and the maintenance of horses and armour (4 & 5 Ph. & M. c. 2), which placed the county militia under a Lord Lieutenant appointed by the monarch, assisted by the Deputy Lieutenants and Justices of the Peace. The entry into force of these Acts in 1558 is seen as the starting date for the organised county militia in England.

Although the militia obligation was universal, it was clearly impractical to train and equip every able-bodied man (in 1574 Surrey had 6000 able men, of whom 1800 were armed, and 96 Demi-lancers with half-armour), so after 1572 the practice was to select a proportion of men for the Trained Bands, who were mustered for regular drills.

== Spanish War ==
When war broke out with Spain training and equipping the militia became a priority. From 1584 counties were organised into groups for training purposes, with emphasis on the invasion-threatened 'maritime' counties including Surrey. These counties were given precedence for training by professional captains under the Lord Lieutenant. In compensation for paying for this training, these counties received a lower quota of men to fill, which meant that they provided a smaller but better-trained force. Surrey's quota was initially set at a crippling 2000 men, later reduced to 1000 divided into four equal companies.

In the 16th Century little distinction was made between the militia and the troops levied by the counties for overseas expeditions. However, the counties usually conscripted the unemployed and criminals rather than the Trained Bandsmen – in 1585 the Privy Council ordered the impressment of able-bodied unemployed men in Surrey (100) and Sussex (150) for the expedition to the Netherlands, but the Queen ordered 'none of her trayned-bands to be pressed'. Replacing the weapons issued to the levies from the militia armouries was a heavy cost on the counties.

The Armada Crisis in 1588 led to the mobilisation of the trained bands on 23 July, and eight Surrey companies were present at the camp at Tilbury where Queen Elizabeth gave her Tilbury speech on 9 August. Surrey furnished 1900 militiamen in total, of whom 1522 were trained (500 of these were stationed to defend the Isle of Wight). They were variously armed with calivers, muskets, corslets (pikemen's armour), longbows or bills, with the highest proportion of old-fashioned bows and bills among the untrained men. After the defeat of the Armada, the army was dispersed to its counties to avoid supply problems, but the men were to hold themselves in readiness. In the continuing war against Spain, the Surrey Trained Bands were called out to London in 1594 and to a new camp at Tilbury in 1596 (when they consisted of eight lancers, 39 light horsemen and 1000 footmen).

The counties continued to provide contingents for foreign service after the defeat of the Armada. In 1592 Captain Taxley with 100 Surrey men served in the army led by Robert Devereux, 2nd Earl of Essex to aid King Henry IV of France against the Catholic League and the Spanish under the Duke of Parma. Four years later another strong Surrey contingent served under Essex at the capture of Cádiz. In 1598 Surrey men served in a Home Counties forces sent to help suppress Tyrone's Rebellion in Ireland, and also served in Flanders against Parma. In total between 1585 and 1602, 85 Surrey men served in Ireland, 200 in France, and 550 in the Netherlands.

The trained bands could also be called out to guard against civil disorder. The Surrey Trained Bands were camped outside London during the trial and execution of the Earl of Essex. Similarly, the accession of King James I saw 100 Surrey trained bandsmen summoned to help guard the City of Westminster during the coronation.

== Stuart reform ==
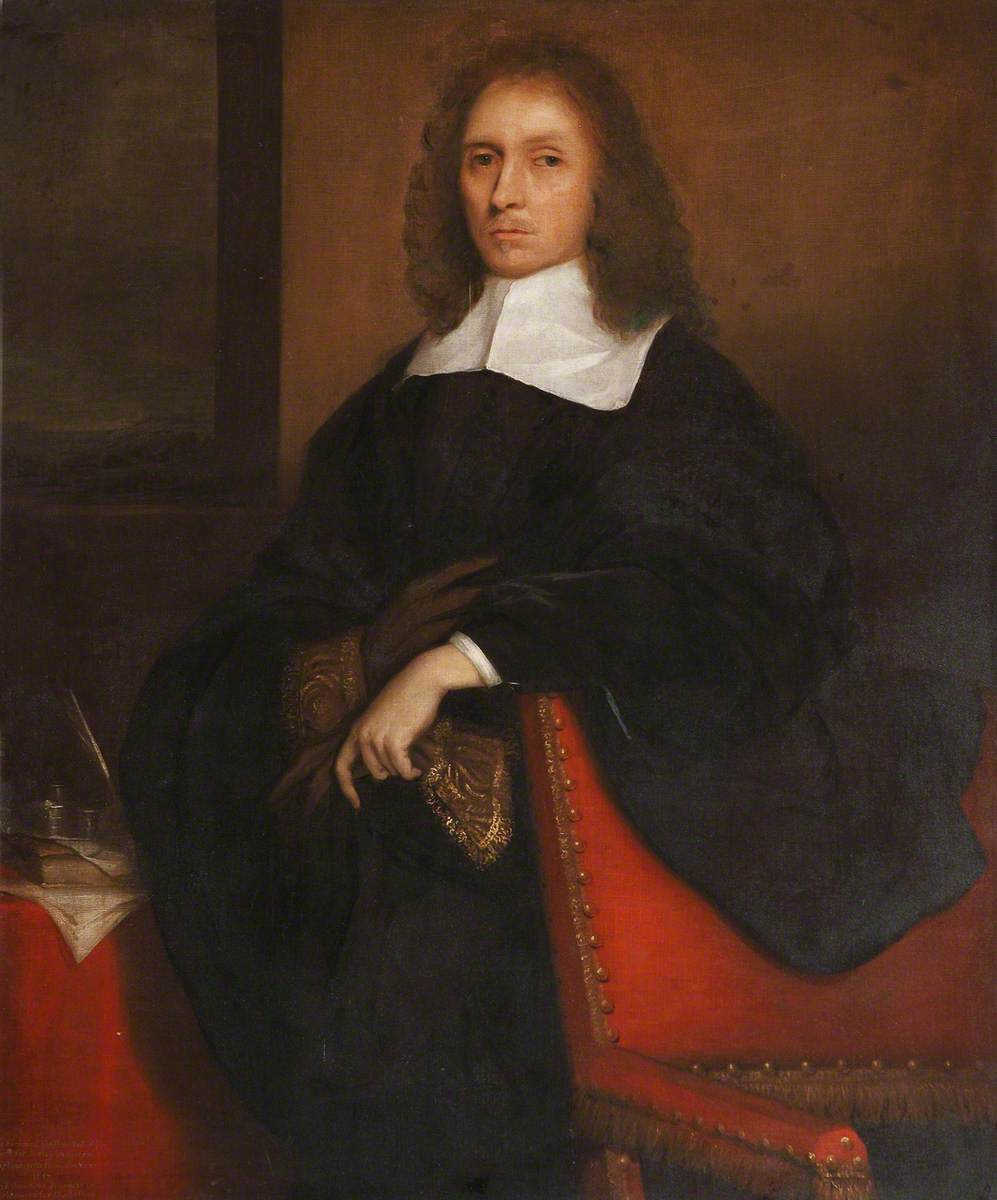
Sir Richard Onslow (1601–64), MP, 'The Red Fox of Surrey'.

The Trained Bands declined during the following decades until James's son King Charles I attempted to reform them into a national force or 'Perfect Militia' answering to the monarch rather than local officials. In 1638 the reformed Surrey Trained Bands totalled 1500 men, with 604 muskets and 896 corslets (pikemen wearing back-and-breast plates), 63 mounted Cuirassiers and 66 mounted Harquebusiers. They were organised as follows:

- East Division Trained Band
- Middle Division Trained Band
- West Division Trained Band
- Surrey Auxiliaries (raised in 1642)
- Surrey Trained Band Horse

Sir Richard Onslow of Clandon Park was Colonel of the Surrey Trained Band Horse from 1626 to 1642 and also commanded the Surrey Auxiliaries.

Trained bands were called out in 1639 and 1640 for the Bishops' Wars. Surrey was not affected in 1639, but in March 1640 the county was ordered to send 800 picked men to rendezvous at Gravesend to embark for the forthcoming campaign in the north. There was considerable resistance from the southern counties and from the men, and many of those who were actually sent by the counties were untrained hired substitutes.

== Civil Wars ==
Control of the militia was one of the major points of dispute between Charles I and Parliament that led to the First English Civil War. Early in 1641 Royalist lords lieutenant were appointed to command the trained bands: on 12 February Charles Howard, 2nd Earl of Nottingham (lord-lieutenant since 1621) was confirmed in command of the Surreys. As the crisis worsened, the London Trained Bands did duty at Westminster for long periods, for example during the trial of the Earl of Strafford, and Parliament arranged for the Middlesex and Surrey Trained Bands under command of the 3rd Earl of Essex to relieve them. On his return to London in November, Charles dismissed them and replaced them with the more Royalist Westminster Trained Bands. As the crisis deepened, Lord Digby and Sir Thomas Lunsford began raising Royalist volunteers and gathering arms and armour at Kingston upon Thames. On 17 January 1642 Sir Richard Onslow, Member of parliament (MP) and Deputy Lieutenant for Surrey, raised the Trained Bands of the county, dispersed Digby's men at Kingston, and seized the county magazine for Parliament. He also put men into Farnham to watch the Portsmouth Road.

In August and September 1642, the Surrey Trained Bands left their county and marched to take part in the Siege of Portsmouth. In November they were back at Kingston, part of the force defending its bridge while the Battle of Brentford was fought nearby.

Once the Civil War developed, neither side made much further use of the Trained Bands except as a source of recruits and weapons for their own full-time regiments. The Southern Association of Hampshire, Kent, Surrey and Sussex raised regiments for Sir William Waller's army; Surrey's initial quota was 400 men. Sir Richard Onslow, for example, raised the Surrey Redcoats, which served as the garrison of Guildford, and he commanded all the Surrey troops at the Siege of Basing House, with four or five companies of his regiment. (Note: It is not entirely clear whether the Surrey Redcoats were the same as the Surrey Auxiliaries, or that they were principally recruited from the Surrey Trained Bands/Auxiliaries.)

=== Southwark Trained Bands ===
The exception to the decline of the Trained Bands was the City of London, whose regiments saw considerable service. Southwark had become a Ward of the city (Bridge Without Ward) in 1550 and was included within the city's ring of fortifications erected in 1642–43. In August 1643 (along with Westminster and the Tower Hamlets in Middlesex) its Trained Bands were transferred from the Lord Lieutenant of Surrey to the Committee of London Militia. The Southwark TBs had been organised as two regiments in 1642 but only one by September 1643, when it paraded nine companies totalling 1394 men at a great muster held on 26 September 1643. It was known as the 'Yellow Regiment' from the colour of the company Ensigns. As with the City regiments, the Southwark Trained Bands also formed an auxiliary regiment (the 'White Auxiliaries' from its ensigns) in 1644 from younger men and apprentices to spread the burden of duty on the citizen soldiers. Several officers bore commissions in both regiments simultaneously. Several of the Southwark officers were members of the Honourable Artillery Company or its rival society, the 'Martial Yard' at Horselydown in Southwark, founded in 1635, one of the instigators being Captain Francis Grove of the Southwark TBs.

The Trained Bands and Auxiliaries of London and the suburbs did turns of duty manning the London fortifications, but were also sent on short campaigns outside the city. The Yellow Regiment of Southwark Trained Bands formed part of a City brigade that served with the Earl of Essex's army between October 1643 and January 1644. The Southwark White Auxiliaries under Col James Hobland set out on 9 April 1644 as part of a brigade commanded by Sir James Harington, MP, of the Westminster Trained Bands. It joined Waller's Army in May 1644 and participated in his defeat at the Battle of Cropredy Bridge on 29 June. After Waller's broken army reached Northampton on 4 July Colonel Hobland and Capt Francis Grove of the Southwark Auxiliaries died of sickness, and the demoralised regiment deserted, taking the bodies of Hobland and Grove home for burial. The Southwark Yellow Regiment was called out again in October in a brigade under Harrington that reinforced the Earl of Essex's army. However, it was left in garrison at Reading, Berkshire, and missed the Second Battle of Newbury on 27 October. It afterwards served in the Second Siege of Basing House and returned to London on 14 December 1644. The White Auxiliaries served in a City brigade under Sir Richard Browne supporting the New Model Army's Siege of Oxford in 1645. A 'commanded party' of 100 musketeers from the White Auxiliaries was sent to assist the final siege of Basing House later that year. This ended the London Trained Bands' participation in the First English Civil War, but all the city and suburban regiments attended a great muster in May 1646. Both Southwark regiments paraded for the Earl of Essex's state funeral in Westminster Abbey in October 1646.

=== Commonwealth ===
As Parliament tightened its grip on the country it passed legislation to reorganise the militia in various counties, including an 'Ordinance to put the County of Surrey in a posture of defence by regulating Trained Bands and other forces' on 1 July 1645, and an 'Act for settling the Militia of the Borough of Southwark and parishes adjacent' on 19 July 1649. New Militia Acts in 1648 and 1650 replaced Lords Lieutenant with county commissioners appointed by Parliament or the Council of State. From now on the term 'Trained Band' began to disappear in most counties. Sir Richard Onslow (who as a Member of Parliament had resigned his commission in 1645 under the Self-denying Ordinance) was ordered to march a regiment of Surrey Militia to Scotland during Cromwell's invasion, but the order was countermanded after the Battle of Dunbar.

During the Scots' counter-invasion in 1651, English county militia regiments were called out to supplement the New Model Army. The Surrey Militia was ordered to a rendezvous at Oxford, and part of the regiment was present at the Battle of Worcester.

After the Civil Wars Parliament tried to reduce the size and influence of the Army and rely instead on the Militia, but the establishment of The Protectorate saw Oliver Cromwell take control of the Militia as a paid force to support his Rule by Major-Generals. Surrey appears to have maintained a Troop of 100 horsemen.

== Surrey Militia ==
After the Restoration of the Monarchy, the English Militia was re-established by the Militia Act 1661 under the control of the king's lords-lieutenant, (Note: The Southwark Militia remained under the Commissioners for the Lieutenancy of the City of London in the 1670s.) the men to be selected by ballot. This was popularly seen as the 'Constitutional Force' to counterbalance a 'Standing Army' tainted by association with the New Model Army that had supported Cromwell's military dictatorship, and almost the whole burden of home defence and internal security was entrusted to the militia.

== Uniforms and insignia ==
There is little information on the uniforms of the Trained Bands. Onslow's Surrey Redcoats may have carried their coats over from his Surrey Auxiliaries. The Southwark White Auxiliaries gained their name from their ensigns rather than their coats. Green coats are mentioned for the Surrey Trained Bands at Farnham in 1643. Under Cromwell's Protectorate the Militia adopted the Army's standard red coat.

When Southwark mustered two regiments in 1642, one had white ensigns with red devices to indicate the captains' seniority, the other red with yellow devices. In September 1643 the single Southwark regiment bore white ensigns with blue devices, but was still known as the Yellow Regiment. The Southwark Auxiliaries carried white ensigns when they were raised in 1644, but these had changed to black by 1645 (probably after a change of colonel).

== Notes ==
- Ian F.W. Beckett, The Amateur Military Tradition 1558–1945, Manchester: Manchester University Press, 1991, ISBN 0-7190-2912-0.
- Lindsay Boynton, The Elizabethan Militia 1558–1638, London: Routledge & Keegan Paul, 1967.
- C.R. Butt, 'Surrey and the Civil War', Journal of the Society for Army Historical Research, Vol 37, No 149 (March 1959), pp. 13–20.
- C.G. Cruickshank, Elizabeth's Army, 2nd Edn, Oxford: Oxford University Press, 1966.
- Capt John Davis, Historical Records of the Second Royal Surrey or Eleventh Regiment of Militia, London: Marcus Ward, 1877.
- Cyril Falls, Elizabeth's Irish Wars, 2nd Edn, London: Constable, 1996, ISBN 0-09-475780-1.
- Sir Charles Firth, Cromwell's Army: A History of the English Soldier during the Civil Wars, the Commonwealth and the Protectorate, 3rd Edn, London: Greenhill, 1992, ISBN 1-85367-120-7.
- Mark Charles Fissell, The Bishops' Wars: Charles I's campaigns against Scotland 1638–1640, Cambridge: Cambridge University Press, 1994, ISBN 0-521-34520-0.
- Sir John Fortescue, A History of the British Army, Vol I, 2nd Edn, London: Macmillan, 1910.
- Samuel Rawson Gardiner, History of the Commonwealth and Protectorate 1649-1656, 4 Vols, London: Longmans, 1903/Adlestrop: Windrush, 1988.
- G.N. Godwin, The Civil War in Hampshire (1642–45) and the story of Basing House, Southampton: Godwin & Son, 1904.
- Col George Jackson Hay, An Epitomized History of the Militia (The Constitutional Force), London: United Service Gazette, 1905/Ray Westlake Military Books, 1987, ISBN 0-9508530-7-0/Uckfield: Naval & Military Press, 2015 ISBN 978-1-78331-171-2.
- John Kenyon, The Civil Wars of England, London" Weidenfeld & Nicolson, 1988, ISBN 0-297-79351-9.
- Lord Macaulay, The History of England from the Accession of James the Second, Popular Edn, London:Longman, 1895.
- F. W. Maitland, The Constitutional History of England, Cambridge: Cambridge University Press, 1908.
- Lawson Chase Nagel, The Militia of London, 1641–1649, PhD thesis, King's College London, 1982.
- Col H.W. Pearse & Brig-Gen H.S. Sloman, History of the East Surrey Regiment, Vol II, 1914–1917, London: Medici Society, 1923/Uckfield: Naval & Military Press, 2004, ISBN 1-84734-759-2.
- Stuart Reid, All the King's Armies: A Military History of the English Civil War 164–1651, Staplehurst: Spelmount, 1998, ISBN 1-86227-028-7.
- Keith Roberts, London And Liberty: Ensigns of the London Trained Bands, Eastwood, Nottinghamshire: Partizan Press, 1987, ISBN 0-946525-16-1.
- Margaret Toynbee & Brig Peter Young, Cropredy Bridge, 1644: The Campaign and the Battle, Kineton: Roundwood, 1970, ISBN 0-900093-17-X.
- Dame Veronica Wedgwood, The King's War 1641–1647: The Great Rebellion, London: Collins, 1958/Fontana, 1966.
- J.R. Western The English Militia in the Eighteenth Century: The Story of a Political Issue 1660–1802, London: Routledge & Kegan Paul, 1965.

== External sources ==
- David Plant, British Civil Wars, Commonwealth & Protectorate, 1638–1660 (The BCW Project)
- History of Parliament Online.
- Queen's Royal Surreys
