= Limitation of the Vend =

Historic cartel in the coal industry

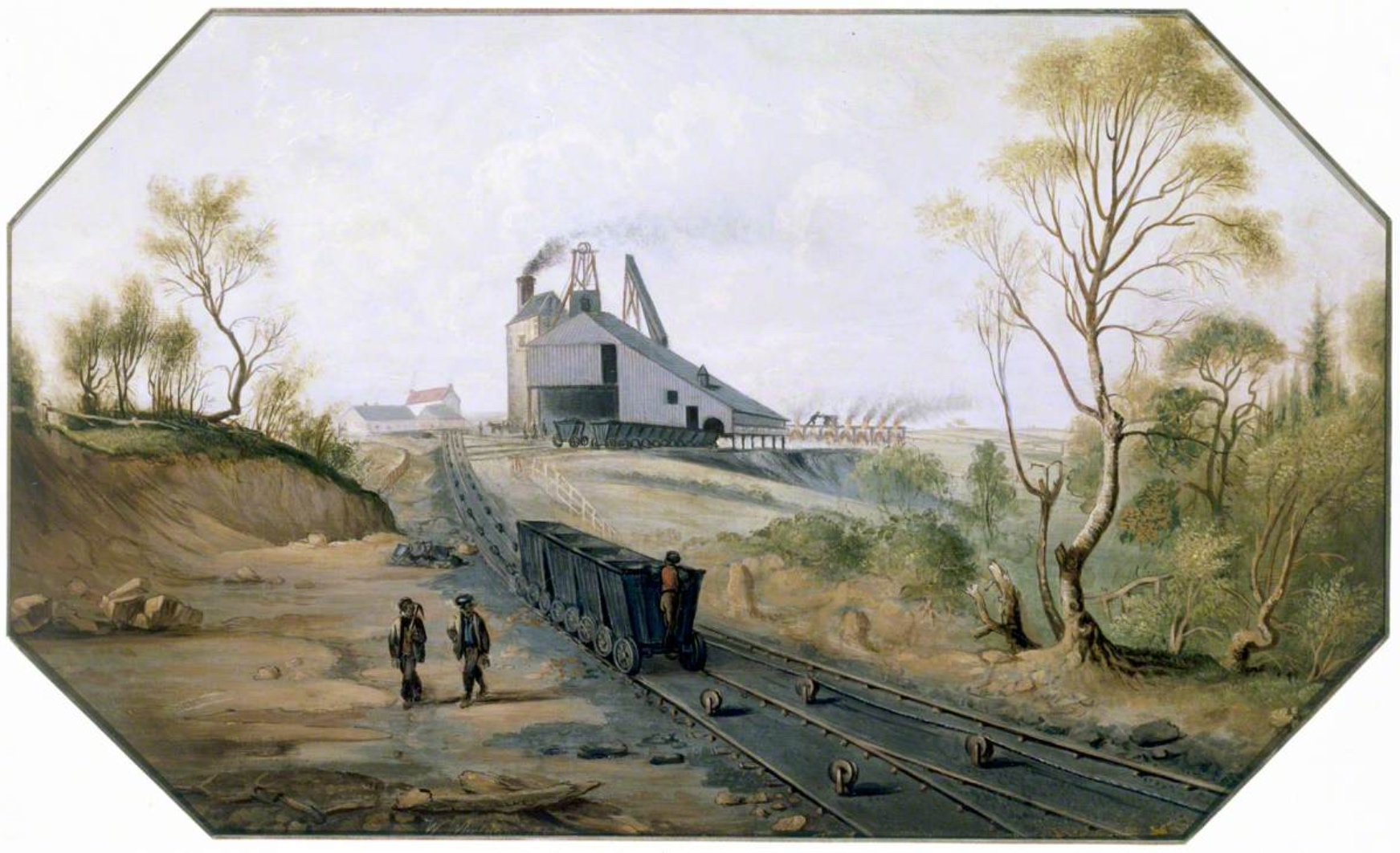
North Eastern Coalfield: Colliery Pit-Head, cable-hauled waggonway in foreground. (H. Wheldon, 1845, Science Museum.)

The Limitation of the Vend was a historic price fixing cartel of coal mine owners of north east England. Its principal customers were ships' captains who purchased cargoes of coal and aimed to resell them in other parts of England; but above all in London which, by becoming the planet's first large mineral-fuelled city, had escaped a natural constraint on the growth of urban areas and was a voracious consumer of coal. Often dated 1771–1845, the Limitation of the Vend can be traced back much earlier.

The cartel appears to have operated openly and without concealment, being administered by a well-organised secretariat which could usually detect any significant cheating. It seems participants thought their cartel was not strictly legal, but were convinced it was morally justified all the same. Never successfully prosecuted by the law, they were investigated at least five times by Parliament, twice at their own instigation. Some of its most powerful members were women.

Despite their relatively high prices, the cartel's coals captured nearly the whole of the lucrative London market. Other prolific coalfields, some much closer to the capital, could rarely undercut. This was because the north east mines were near tidal rivers with excellent sea-transport links. Though their conveniently located coal deposits were soon exhausted, they kept up their competitive advantage by investing heavily in innovative deep mining, rail transportation and bulk material handling technologies. The region has been called the Florence of the Industrial Revolution, the Silicon Valley of its day, and the native land of railways.

The Limitation of the Vend has left meticulous records; hence scholars can study the behaviour of a real cartel in cliometric detail. To what extent its members really enjoyed monopoly profits is still debated, however. Unlike most price-fixing business combinations, which soon collapse e.g. because members start cheating, the Limitation maintained itself for an exceptionally long time, albeit with occasional outbreaks of cut throat competition, being perhaps the most durable cartel that has ever existed. It has been described as one of the most fascinating problems in economic history.

== Other names ==
The cartel has also been referred to as the Limitation of the Vends, the Regulation of the Vend(s), the Restriction of Vends, the Committee of Coal Owners of the Rivers Tyne and Wear the Joint Durham and Northumberland Coal Owners Association, the Newcastle Vend, the United Committee of the Northern Coal Trade, and the Coal Trade Office in Newcastle.

== The combination: preliminary outline ==
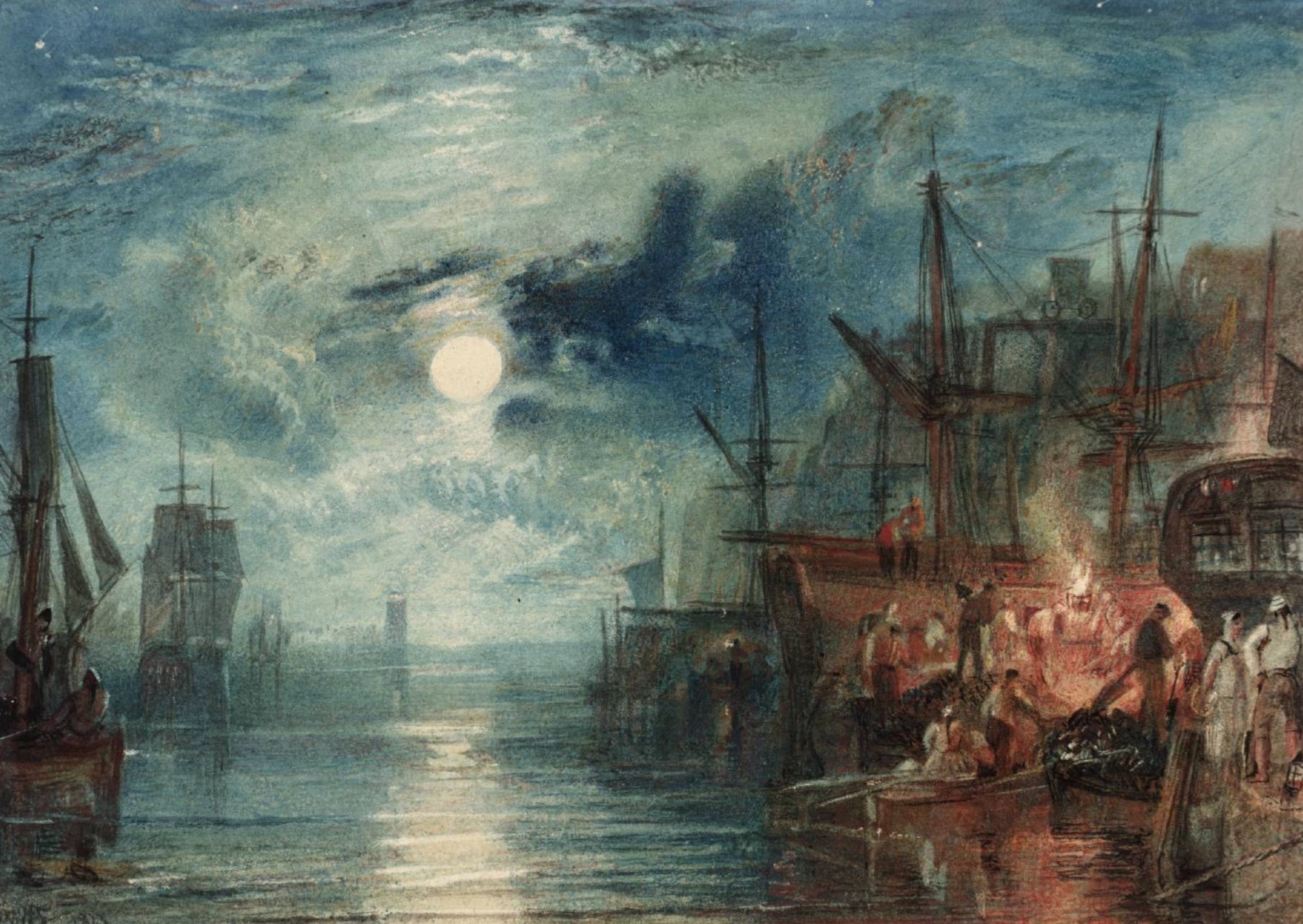
Shields, on the River Tyne (watercolour on paper by J. M. W. Turner, 1823, Tate). Keelmen are loading coal onto waiting colliers by moonlight.

The Limitation of the Vend was an association of coal mine owners of County Durham and Northumberland. At yearly intervals its members negotiated an agreement. It laid down each mine's share of the market for the coming year and the lowest prices it was allowed to charge, arrived at by taking into account the mine's productive capacity and the qualities of its coals.

A committee kept a close eye on the London coal market and decided the total sale ("issue") allowed for the coming month (later, fortnight). No mine was to load ships in excess of its allocation or sell below its list price.

An efficient secretariat kept accounts and could usually tell if there was significant cheating. Members who delivered too much coal, or who charged less than the prescribed price, could be "fined". The fine was calculated by a method laid down in the agreement; the money was to be paid over for the benefit of members who had sold less than their quotas.

Coals sold to local consumers, or for export to foreign countries, were free of the cartel, and cheap. The agreement applied to coals sold to ships in the coastwise trade only. Most of those vessels, typically moored in the rivers Tyne or Wear, or later, the Tees, were bound for London. Such was the volume of the London trade that a modest tax on it paid for the rebuilding of the public spaces after the 1666 Great Fire, including St Paul's Cathedral and the 51 Wren churches. The coastwise trade became proverbial in the English language.

There was nothing to stop members from resigning and offering their coals to ships at keener prices in any amount. Moreover, mines had conflicting aims and interests. The most productive mines wanted large quotas and vends, and lenient fines for those who exceeded them. The least productive mines wanted higher prices, smaller vends for everybody, and tougher fines. Thus, possibly no mine was happy with the terms and conditions eventually agreed. Despite all this, the members did usually keep to the agreement, and negotiate next year's. This went on for nearly 75 years; arguably, for much longer. It may have been the most durable cartel that has existed.

Since most cartels, even stable cartels, last only a small fraction of that time — most commonly, about 4 years — then collapse e.g. through cheating, the problem in economics is to explain the length and stability of the Limitation of the Vend. In 1941 Austin Robinson called it one of the most fascinating unsolved problems in economic history.

== The north east coalfield and its geographical advantage ==
Though histories of the coal industry tend to concentrate on mining, much of it had to do with transport. "The remarkable point [is] that it became economically feasible to move such large amounts of a heavy and bulky material over comparatively long distances. In this respect the coasting trade is of the utmost significance".

There were rich coal deposits in several parts of Great Britain, some much nearer to London, but the north east coalfield of County Durham and Northumberland — often simply called the Great Northern Coalfield — had a competitive advantage. The advantage was the low cost of sea transport to the London consumer.

=== Sea transport ===
Until modern road surfaces were developed it was much cheaper to send bulky cargoes by water. According to various estimates, the price of coal if taken by the roads of the era doubled within five or ten miles of the pit-head, hence soon became unaffordable. But the north east coalfield was intersected by navigable rivers that flowed into the North Sea, only 300 miles away from London's river Thames.

The north east coalfield's geographical advantage

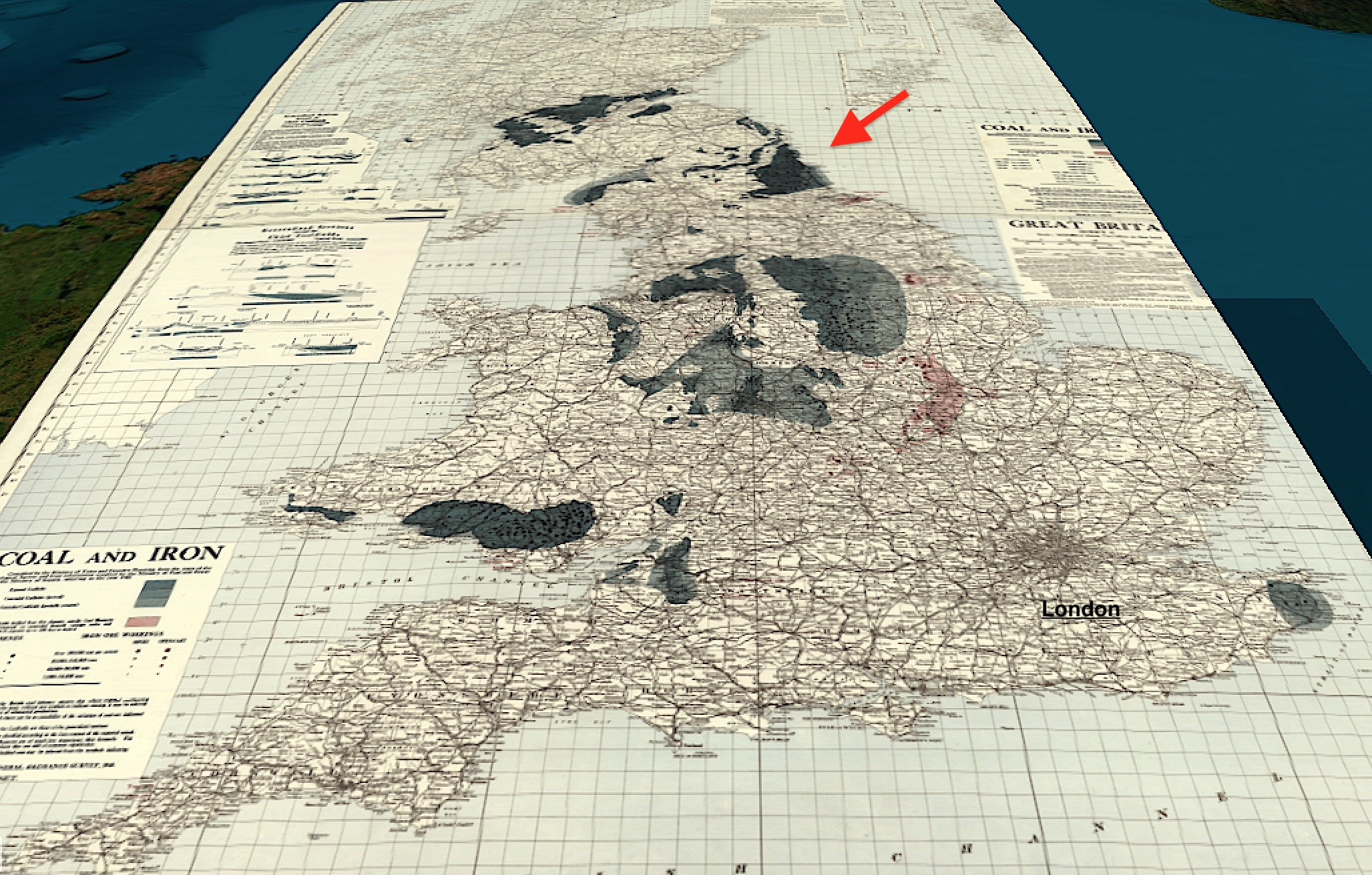
Coalfields of Great Britain (Ordnance Survey: National Library of Scotland) ↙ north east coalfield

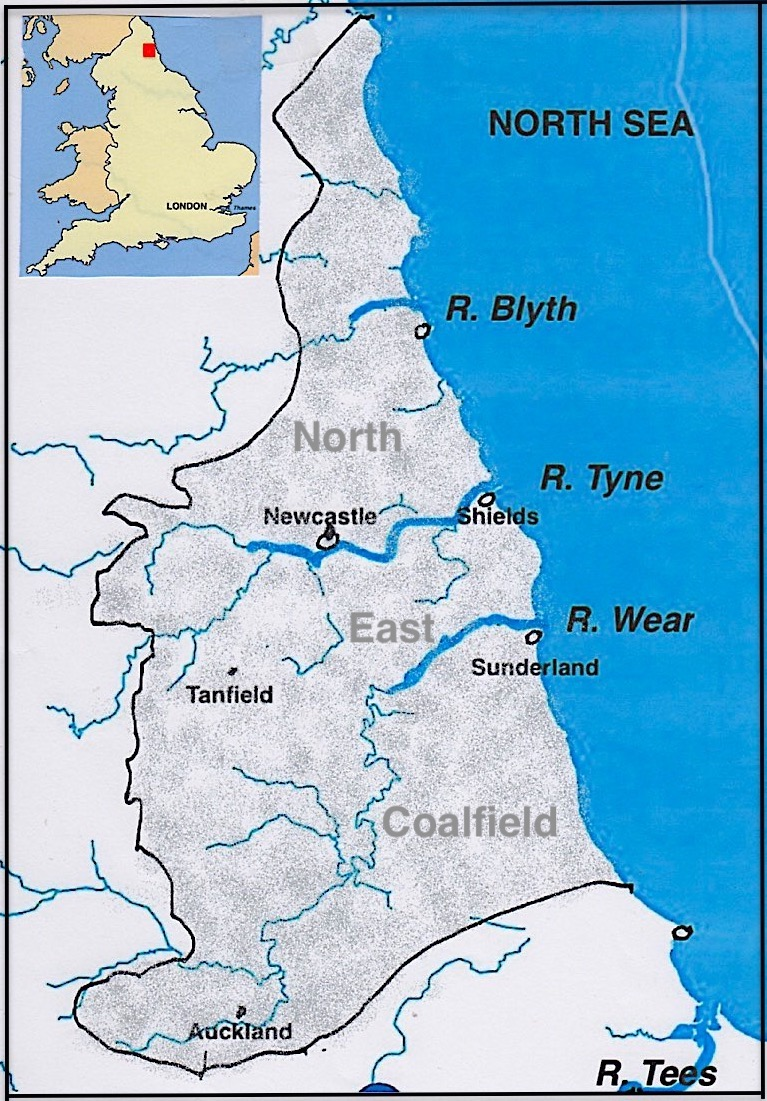
The north east coalfield c. 1750

A recent estimate is that in 1750 it would have been about 65 times cheaper to send coal to London by sea than by road. Seasale collieries were near enough to the tideway (tidal rivers) to do so; landsale collieries had to be content with the local market.

Other coalfields did send coal to London by sea, but the voyages were longer. Already in the 17th century small amounts of Pembrokeshire culm (good for hothouses) and Scotch great coal (for warming noblemen's mansions) were burnt in the neighbourhood of London, though they were expensive.

=== The coastal shipping trade ===
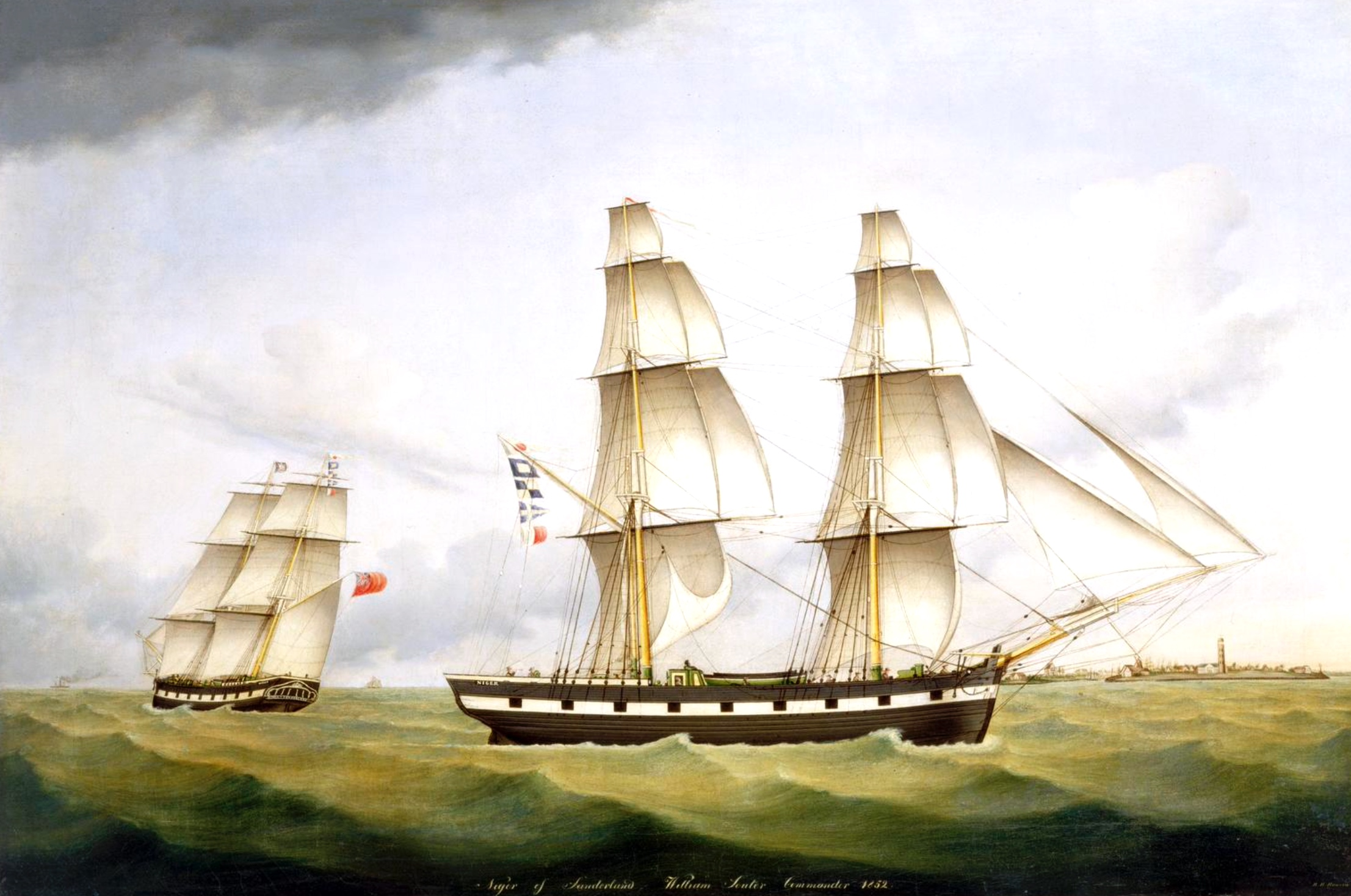
An east coast collier (Niger of Sunderland William Souter Commander: B. H. Hansen, 1852, Science Museum Group)

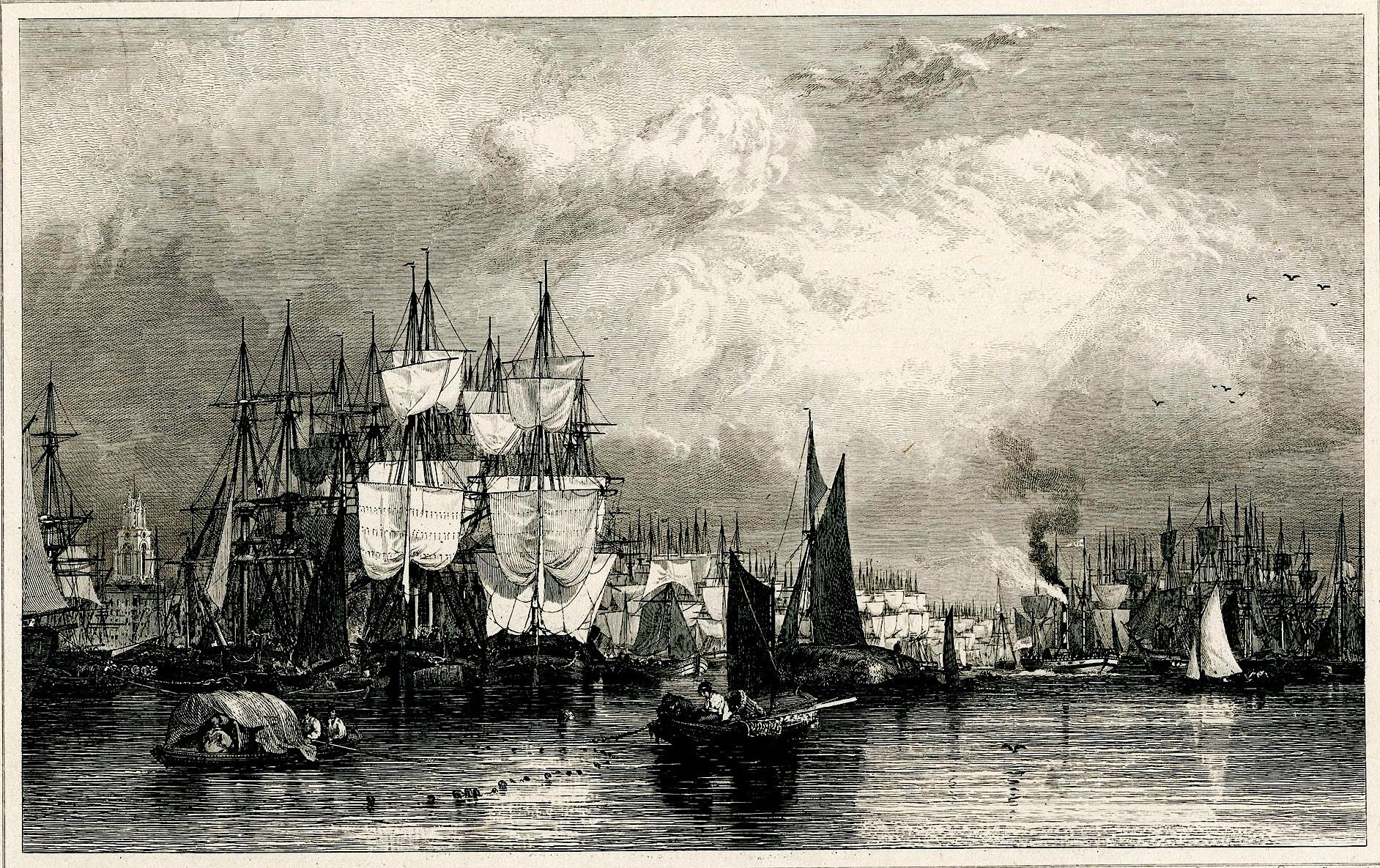
Collier congestion in the Port of London. (Edward William Cooke, The Thames near Limehouse, called the Lower Pool, British Museum)

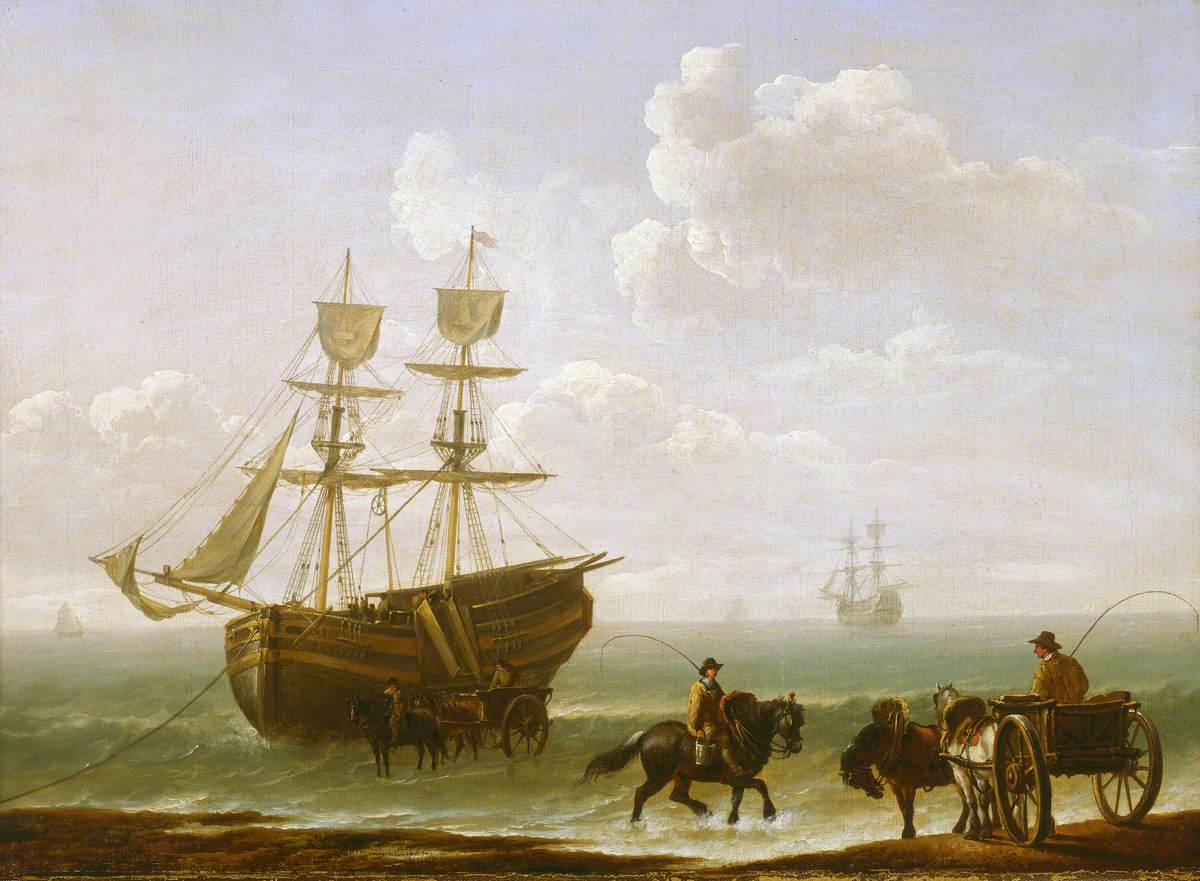
A Beached Collier Unloading into Carts (Julius Caesar Ibbetson, c. 1790: Royal Museums Greenwich.) Coal was sold to customers along England's east coast.

==== To London ====
In general, the north east mines did not ship their coals to London themselves. They sold them to colliers — typically small sailing brigs, later snows and schooners— that loaded in the north east rivers and resold their cargoes in the river Thames or other ports. The sea voyage to London in fair weather typically took 5–6 days.

This coastwise trade, in itself, was highly competitive, because participants were numerous and ships were easily switched into and out of the business. Thus though many ships plied in the coal trade, few specialised in it. East coast colliers have been described as "among the very best sailing vessels in operation anywhere".

A ship might be owned by her captain, a syndicate of investors, or both; the same was true of her cargo.

By 1800, there were 600 colliers in the London trade alone, shipping an annual 1.35 million tons. They caused severe congestion in the Pool of London and in 1829 it was decided that no more than 250 should be allowed there at the same time. In 1820 the Limehouse Basin was dug to allow some colliers to transship their cargoes to the new Regent's Canal, which conveniently skirted Regency London's built up area.

This coastal trade was the largest branch of the British shipping industry by volume; and it had some political leverage. The North Sea voyages were hazardous (in one extreme case, 200 ships were lost at the same time), especially on voyages to supply the winter coal market. In wartime, enemy privateers tried to seize them; hence they were armed, or painted with fake gun-ports. It was believed the trade bred tougher and more skilful seamen; it was called a "nursery" for the Royal Navy and was even said to account for England's naval supremacy.

==== Other destinations ====
Although most ships in the coastwise trade sailed for London, a substantial proportion, particularly if departing from Sunderland, delivered to other places. Colliers were strongly built with flat bottoms, and small ones could trade from beaches for example.

==== Turn-around ====
A collier's productivity depended on how many voyages a year she could achieve — eight was considered not bad — and was affected by her turn-around time in the ports. Explained Simon Ville:

Colliers arriving in the Tyne would drop anchor at Shields. The master travelled across land to Newcastle to order a cargo of coal. Coal was transported from the pit head to the river side and loaded into small keel boats. The keelmen sailed to Shields and discharged the cargo into the waiting ship. This process would be repeated using several keel boats until the vessel was fully loaded. This was expensive and time-consuming ...

If the master wanted the best grades of coals e.g. Wallsend (which sold better in London, but were harder to procure) the delay was greater. This could happen because the best mines had used up their monthly quotas. "No more could be supplied till the commencement of the ensuing month; and detentions of this kind, as your Committee have reason to believe, frequently occurred", Parliament was told. It was hard for the master to make the right buying decision not least because prices in London fluctuated tremendously.

Since ships lost money by being kept waiting — which might happen on purpose if they had offended the cartel — in 1811 the shipping industry procured an Act of Parliament (the Turn Act) by which colliers in the Tyne waiting for a load had to be served strictly in turn, no ship being allowed to jump the queue. Thus, refusing to sell a ship coal was a breach of the law. The cartel admitted they evaded the law by demanding steep prices instead of refusing point blank.

=== Sea versus rail ===
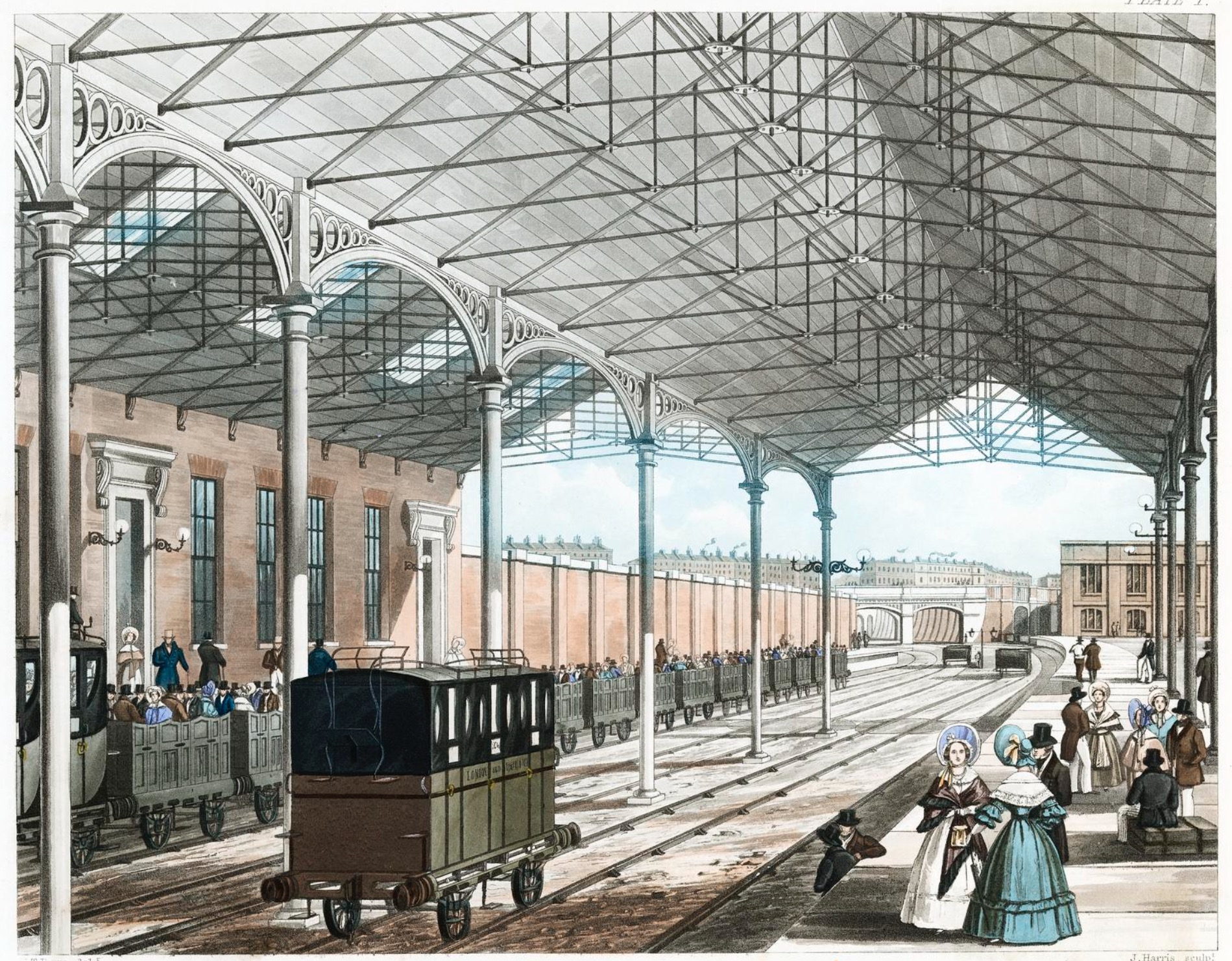
Euston Square Station, 1837, terminus of the London and Birmingham Railway (Thomas Talbot Bury: Science Museum)

The London and Birmingham Railway, London's first inter-city line (1833), also connected the capital to the much nearer Midland coalfield; this was strongly opposed by the Limitation of the Vend, who regarded it as unfair competition, which in one sense it was. As it turned out, however, very little coal came to London by rail during the cartel's lifetime. Even in 1845 it carried a minuscule 8,377 tons. In that year coastal shipping conveyed 3,177,321 tons from the north east, and 163,994 tons from Scotland, Yorkshire or Wales. Even canals carried 60,310 tons.

Textbooks on 19th-century national transport history devote little attention to coastal shipping; overwhelmingly, they concentrate on railways. Yet, until about 1910, more ton-miles of British goods were moved by coastal shipping than by all the railways combined. A long-distance railway required heavy investment in infrastructure; a coasting business, practically none. Steamships were much faster than bulk freight trains, which were given low priority and averaged 2 miles in an hour, if that. Sailers, even if at the mercy of the winds, were usefully conveyed by the tides, and consumed no fuel. There was even a type that could be crewed by two men and a boy.

=== The consumers ===
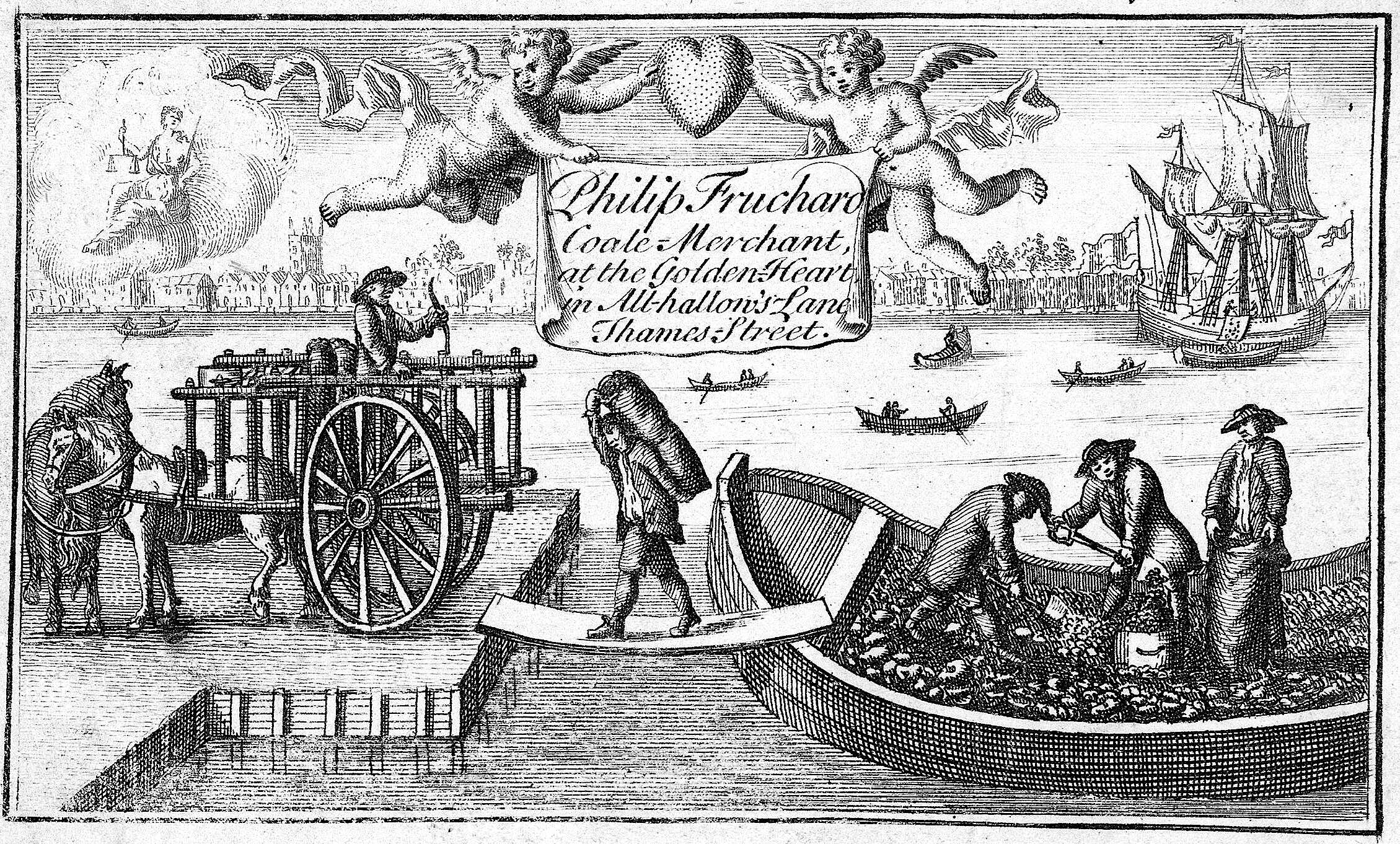
Lightermen landing coal in London from a Newcastle collier, right background (trade card c. 1730, British Museum). Hundreds of millions of tons of coal were imported by sailing ship.

London was, by a long way, the best customer for the north east's coals. Already in the medieval era it was importing coal from Newcastle, there being a Sea-coal Lane in the city by 1228. During the early modern era London was England's leading manufacturing centre, and used coal for brewing, sugar refining, lime burning, glass-making, soap-making, blacksmithing, and brick-burning — building up London required an enormous number of bricks. But soon the main use was for domestic heating. As trees were cut down firewood became scarce and expensive. Though burning coal gave off noxious fumes, Londoners gradually evolved a new style of house that could burn it indoors, a thing that astonished foreign visitors.

It was "a watershed moment in the environmental history of the world": the transition from organic wood to non-renewable coal. Early modern towns had been fuelled by firewood, but the amount available was what could be grown locally. (If more land was devoted to growing trees, there was less for food.) Thus these towns could not grow beyond a certain size. London, by pioneering the switch from organic firewood to mineral coal, managed to escape the law of diminishing returns altogether. From perhaps 65,000 people in 1550, it grew as no human settlement had done before, reaching eight million inhabitants by 1950. Coal imports enabled, and tracked, this increase.

=== Potential competitors ===
Despite its advantage, the north east coalfield was exposed to potential competition. Robert C. Allen found that coal markets in Great Britain were highly integrated i.e. there were no opportunities for arbitrage between different regions. Though other coalfields did not send very much coal to the capital before 1860, that was partly because the cartel was careful not to push its prices too high.

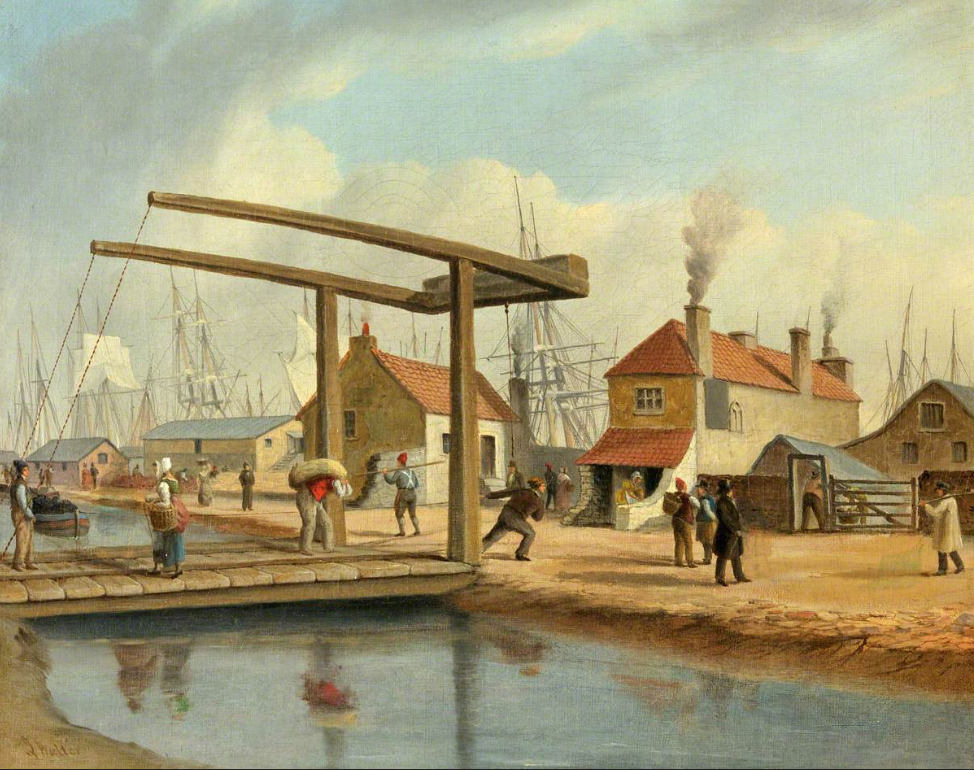
Competing coalfields needed investment in transport infrastructure. (The Monmouthshire Canal at Newport, Joseph Walter, Newport Museum)

For example, tramways and canals were built, eventually, that connected the South Wales coalfield to the sea; it was still sending coal to London by sea in the 1950s. So were the Scottish ports of Leith and Methil, as were Yorkshire's Goole and Hull. The Grand Junction Canal (1800) connected the midlands coalfield to London. That the Limitation opposed such canals shows they were a credible threat to its business. "Easy access to navigable water was an immense economic asset, and one fiercely defended".

The north east mine owners knew that, if they set their cartel prices too high, it would stimulate competition from other regions, and they behaved accordingly. Their chairman admitted it to the House of Lords in 1830:

Q. The Price as now fixed at Newcastle is a high a Price as can be supported, without letting into the Market other Coals which compete with them? A. I feel perfectly confident of that.

In 1828 they had made the mistake of fixing the prices too high, and as a result "we found a great Influx of Coals from other Parts of the Kingdom, from Wales, from Scotland, from Yorkshire and Stockton..." (At that time Stockton was not in the cartel.) "We endeavour to keep the Prices at a Point a little below what the Consumer can get the same Article for elsewhere".

Elaine S. Tan found that these potential competitors, just by existing, set a cap on the prices the Limitation could safely impose. Many "fringe" mines in the potentially competing regions, being near the surface, required very little investment, and could be exploited opportunistically. There were rural workers who mined coal on a casual basis. Small traders in those regions — grocers and drapers — invested the small sums required.

== The coal industry as a business investment ==
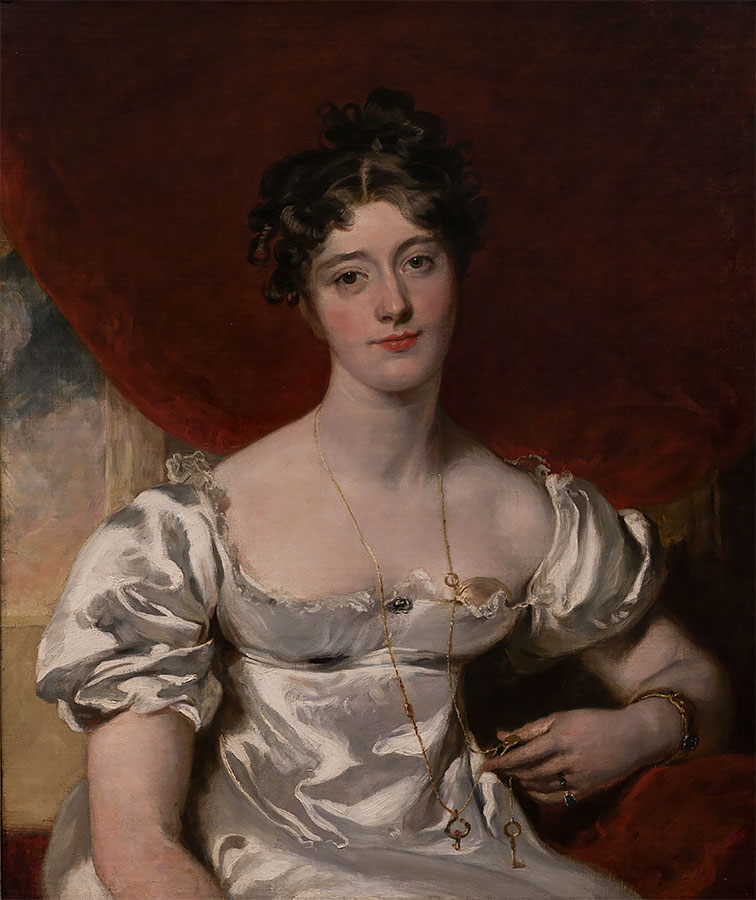
Frances Anne, Marchioness of Londonderry: from society hostess to coal magnate (Thomas Lawrence, Museo Nacional de Bellas Artes, Cuba)

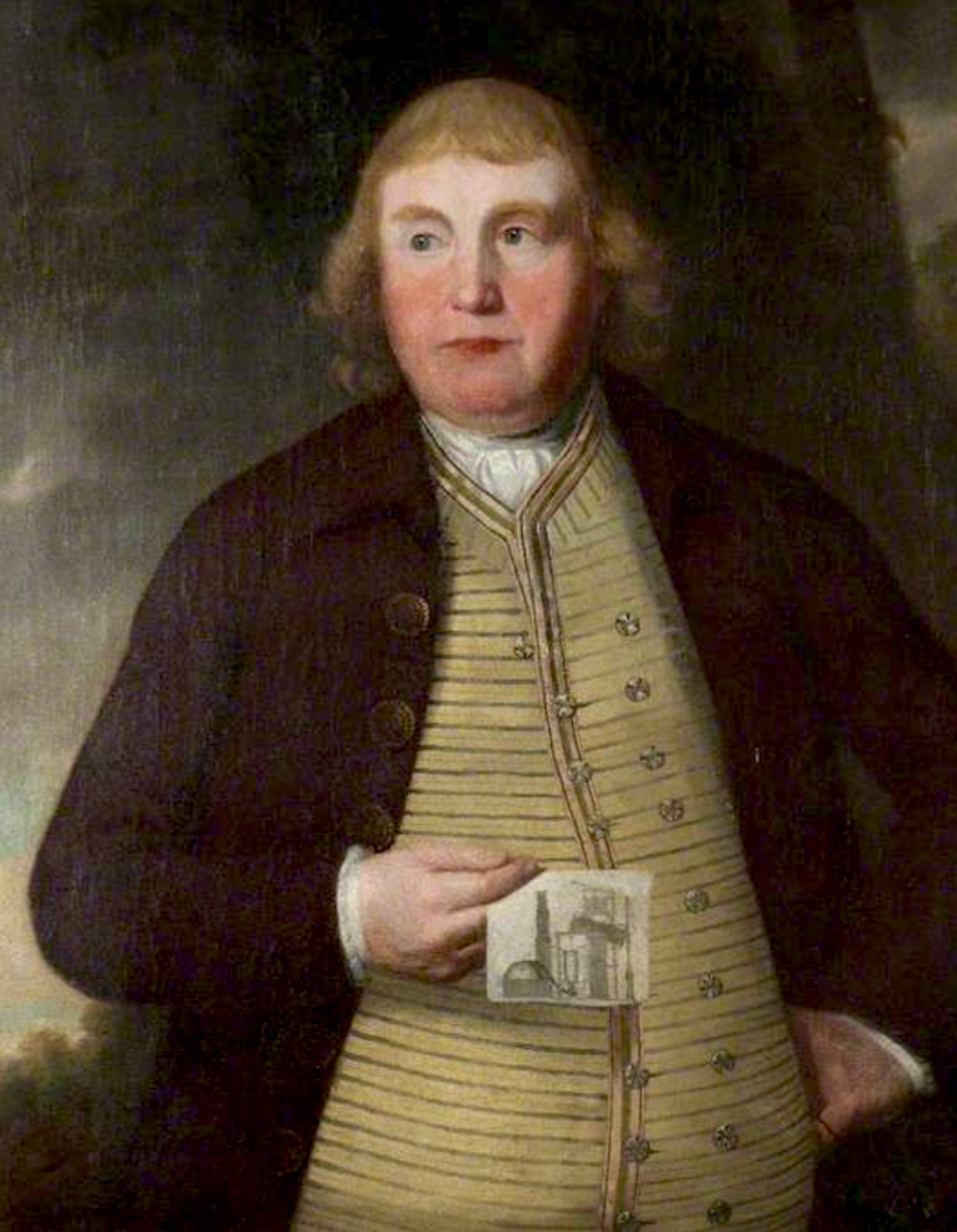
Portrait of a gentleman with a drawing of a Newcomen engine (unknown artist, Ironbridge Museum)

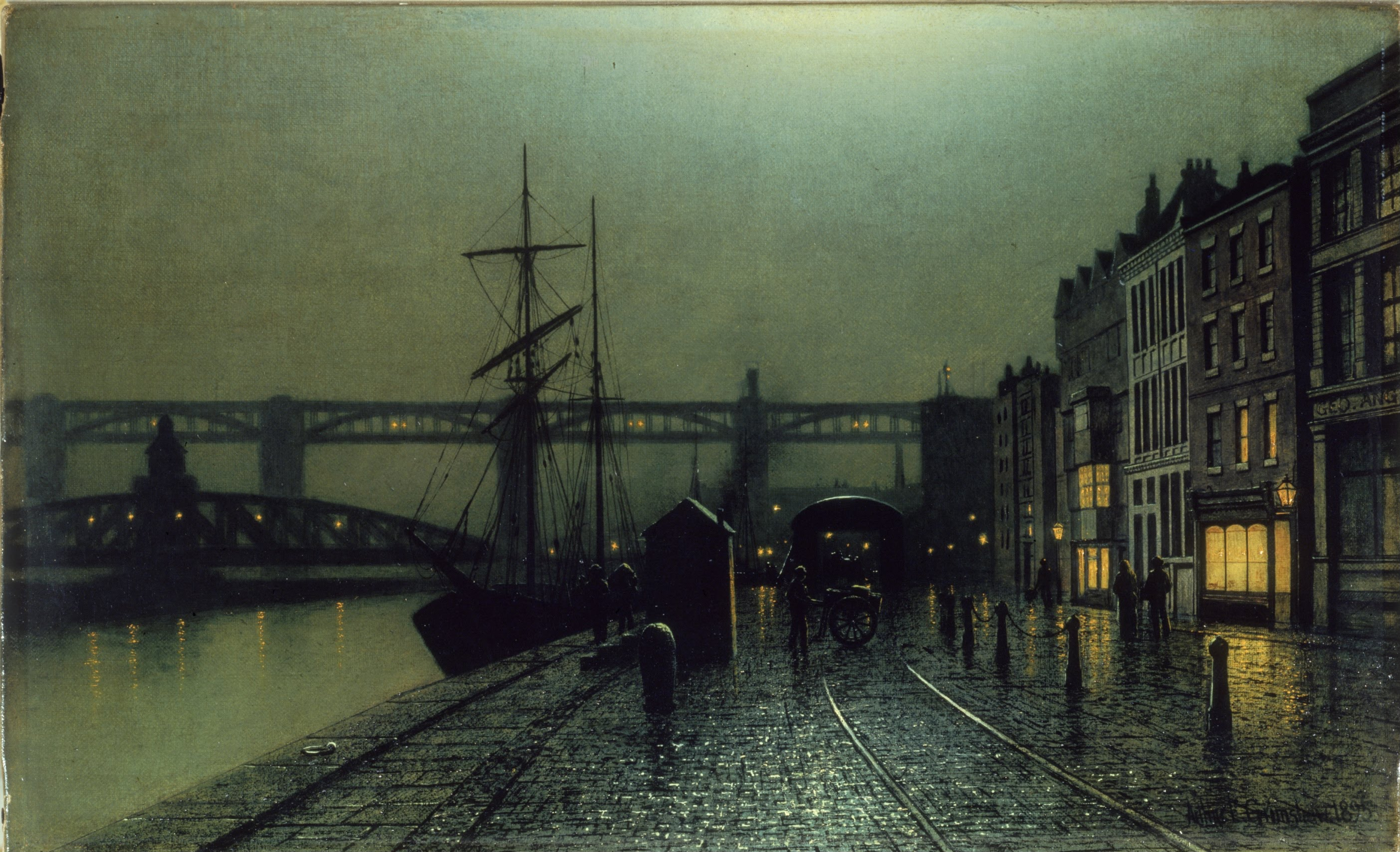
The Quayside, Newcastle upon Tyne (Arthur Edmund Grimshaw: Laing Art Gallery)

=== Mining ===
Speculators were tempted to invest their capital in the north east coal-mining industry, attracted by the success of what was a fortunate minority.

==== Spectacular cases ====
Some families made large fortunes in the north east coalfield: for example the Londonderrys who, unlike most owners of coal-bearing lands, were in the mining business themselves. The headstrong Charles Vane, 3rd Marquess of Londonderry, unable to touch his wife's vast capital without the consent of her trustees, borrowed riskily and founded Seaham Harbour, the coalfield's first sea port. After his death she, Frances Vane, Marchioness of Londonderry, managed the business herself. According to Benjamin Disraeli, she had been a society hostess who, having brains, sought excitement. She found it on the shores of the North Sea, "surrounded by her collieries and her blast furnaces and her railroads and the unceasing telegraphs, with a port hewn out of the solid rock, screw steamers and four thousand pitmen under her control". Disraeli said she had a regular office "and here she transacts, with innumerable agents, immense business".

Perhaps the most dramatic example, however, was William Russell who bought the intractable Wallsend Colliery and, after many setbacks, including numerous fatal accidents, struck a bonanza. It was a large, six-foot thick seam of coal, so excellent that other collieries in Britain took to calling their products "Wallsend". Russell made at least £50 million in present-day money buying himself Brancepeth Castle and a parliamentary pocket borough.

While the high human cost of mining coal is not the topic of this article, this colliery was notorious for its frequent mining disasters, owing to its proximity to a gas field. "Fizzers" emitted large quantities of methane — much more than in ordinary fire damp — which had to be vented to the surface and flared, as in a modern oil well (see illustration, Fiery mine at night). The precaution was not always successful; in one explosion 102 men and boys were killed, leaving 73 widows and children without support.

==== The norm ====
However, to invest in the industry was not necessarily a wise decision, or even a rational one. Chicago economic historian John U. Nef, in his The Rise of the British Coal Industry, said the business was, in Adam Smith's words, "a lottery, in which the prizes do not compensate the blanks". It could become a ruinous addiction, like treasure hunting.

History seems to show that coal mining almost invariably attracts more capital than can be profitably invested, and that this capital remains in the industry, in apparent defiance of the rules laid down by the classical economists, even when the return on it is lower than that received by adventurers in other industries. * * * Experience shows that mine owners continue to work their pits, even at a loss, when the market is already glutted with coal.

Reliable quantitative accounts are not available before about 1850, when it appears the net return on capital in coal mining in Britain was about 5%, little more than could have been got by lending the money safely in mortgages. Yet the industry was so risky that until 1827 it was not possible to obtain fire insurance. A coal mine was not acceptable as collateral for a financial loan.

The town clerk of Newcastle told the House of Commons (1800) that although Wallsend colliery made "outrageous profit", and two or three others made "large" profits, on the whole it was not a sound investment.

I have lived my whole life in a Coal Mine country. I have possessed the means, and have had frequent opportunities offered me, of adventuring in speculations of that nature; I have ever declined doing so upon this principle, that the average profits resulting from those adventures were inadequate to the employment of so much capital as they required, and to the risk attending them.

To like effect wrote economist William Stanley Jevons: "That in some cases prodigious profits are made, as in the case of the original Wallsend mine, is well known. But this cannot usually be the case, otherwise the wide areas of land yet known to contain untouched seams of coal of the finest qualities, would at once be broken up by speculators, who are never wanting. That deep mines are so deliberately opened is a sufficient proof that the highest prices obtained are, taking all mining risks and charges into account, only an average equivalent for the capital invested."

=== Mineral leasing ===
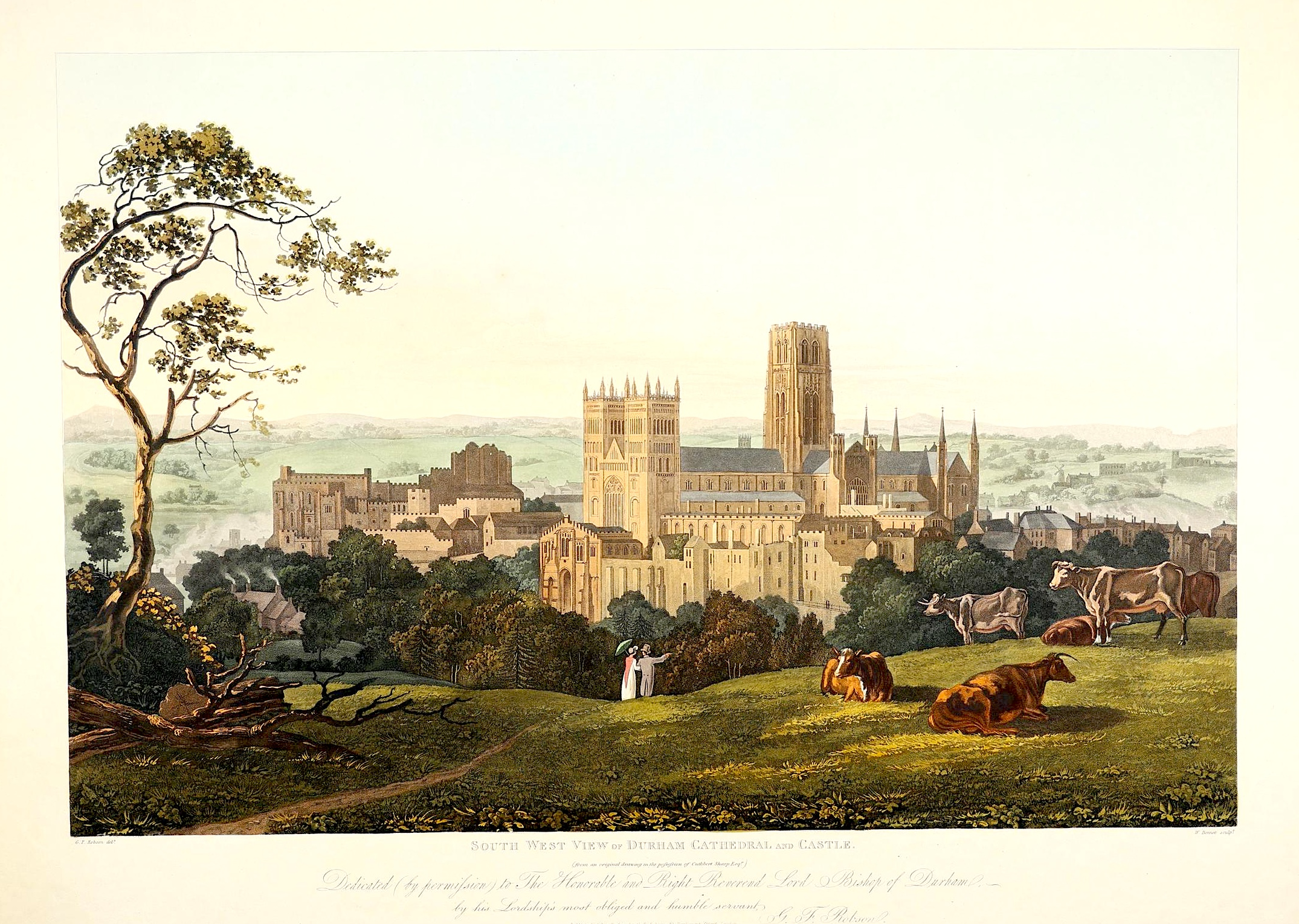
Durham Cathedral (George Fennell Robson, British Museum). The Church was the biggest owner of coal-bearing lands.

In Britain, unlike other Western European countries, mineral deposits belonged, not to the State, but to the owner of the soil. With time, owners of coal-bearing land, instead of mining it themselves, tended to lease the mineral rights to entrepreneurs. These landowners were content to receive a fixed rent plus royalties on the tonnage. They avoided the risks, but got what was a modest return for the exploitation of a wasting asset. Clark and Jacks from a sample of 203 coal leases found that the average royalty on a ton of coal was only 10% of the pit-head price.

In contrast, in the modern world the mineral rent paid for some oil reserves in the Middle East is close to the whole of the wellhead price. That is why there were so few coal millionaires in eighteenth and nineteenth century England, in contrast to the oil billionaires of today.

==== The Church ====
In County Durham the largest coal landholder was the Dean and Chapter of Durham Cathedral. The church's coal-bearing lands were let on increasingly businesslike terms. By 1819 they were asking £89,750 — more than £6 million in present-day money's worth — to renew the lease of Rainton Colliery, which Lord Londonderry's advisor John Buddle called "exorbitant in the highest degree". Londonderry called their bluff.

== North east coalfield: investment in technology ==
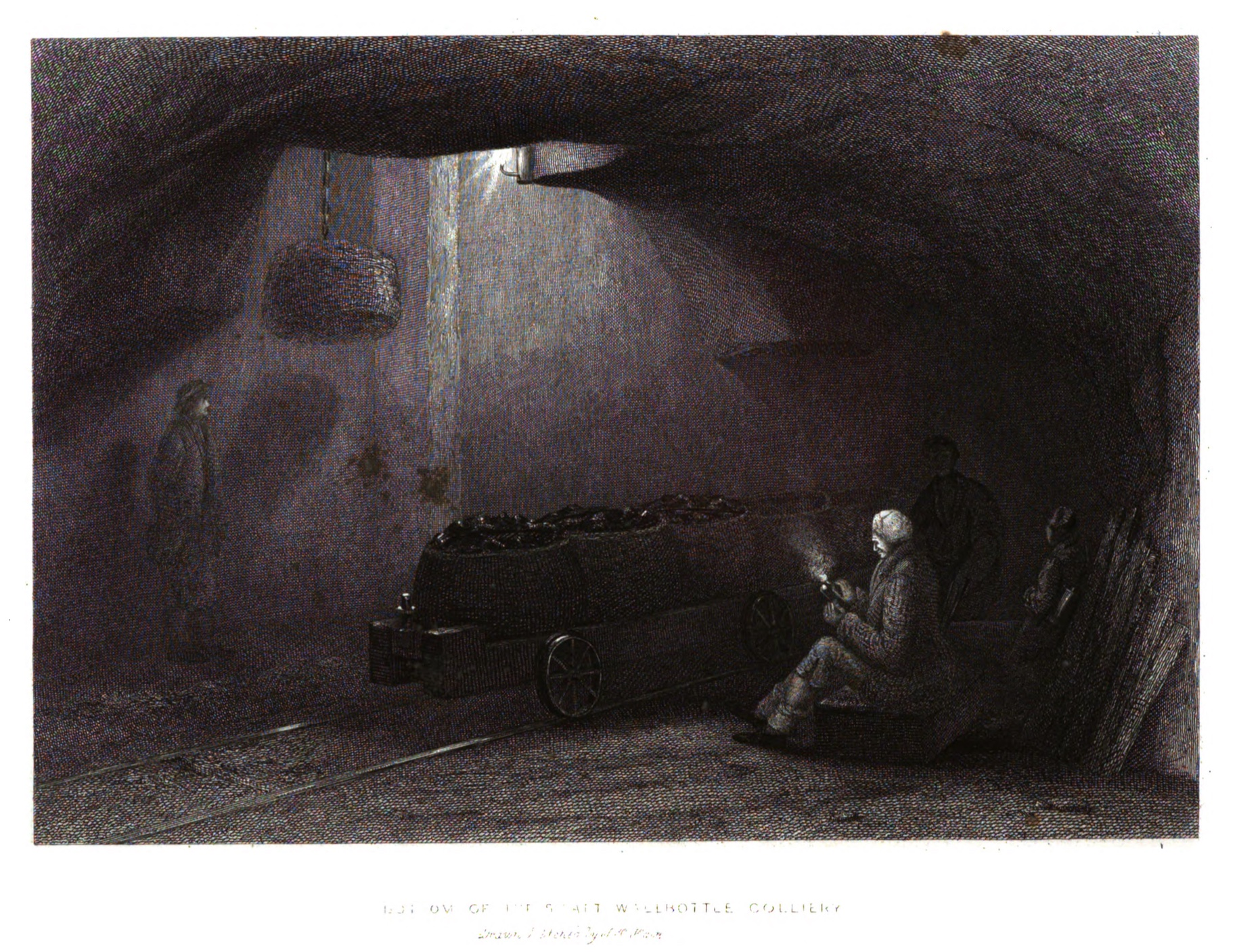
Bottom of the Shaft, Wallbottle Colliery (Thomas Harrison Hair, 1844, Views of the Collieries of Northumberland and Durham)

The coalfield kept up its competitive advantage even after its easily accessible deposits had been exhausted. Although not the only one to innovate, by the eighteenth century the Northumberland and Durham coalfield was the largest and most technically advanced in the world. It has been said that Newcastle was "the Florence of the Industrial Revolution"; "the north-east was the Silicon Valley of its day".

=== Deep mining ===
Already maybe by 1600 (but at the latest, 1700) not only had the surface outcrops of coal been worked out, but so had the shallower underground seams where a mine could be drained easily by opening an adit and letting the water run further downhill. Deep mining became necessary, which brought a host of problems. "In 1700 the deepest mines were already about 300 feet [100 m]. By the 1750s they reached 600 feet. By the 1820s some pits reached nearly 900 feet underground". In 1828 two thirds of the mines were more than 300 foot deep, one third more than 600.

==== Depth and winning ====
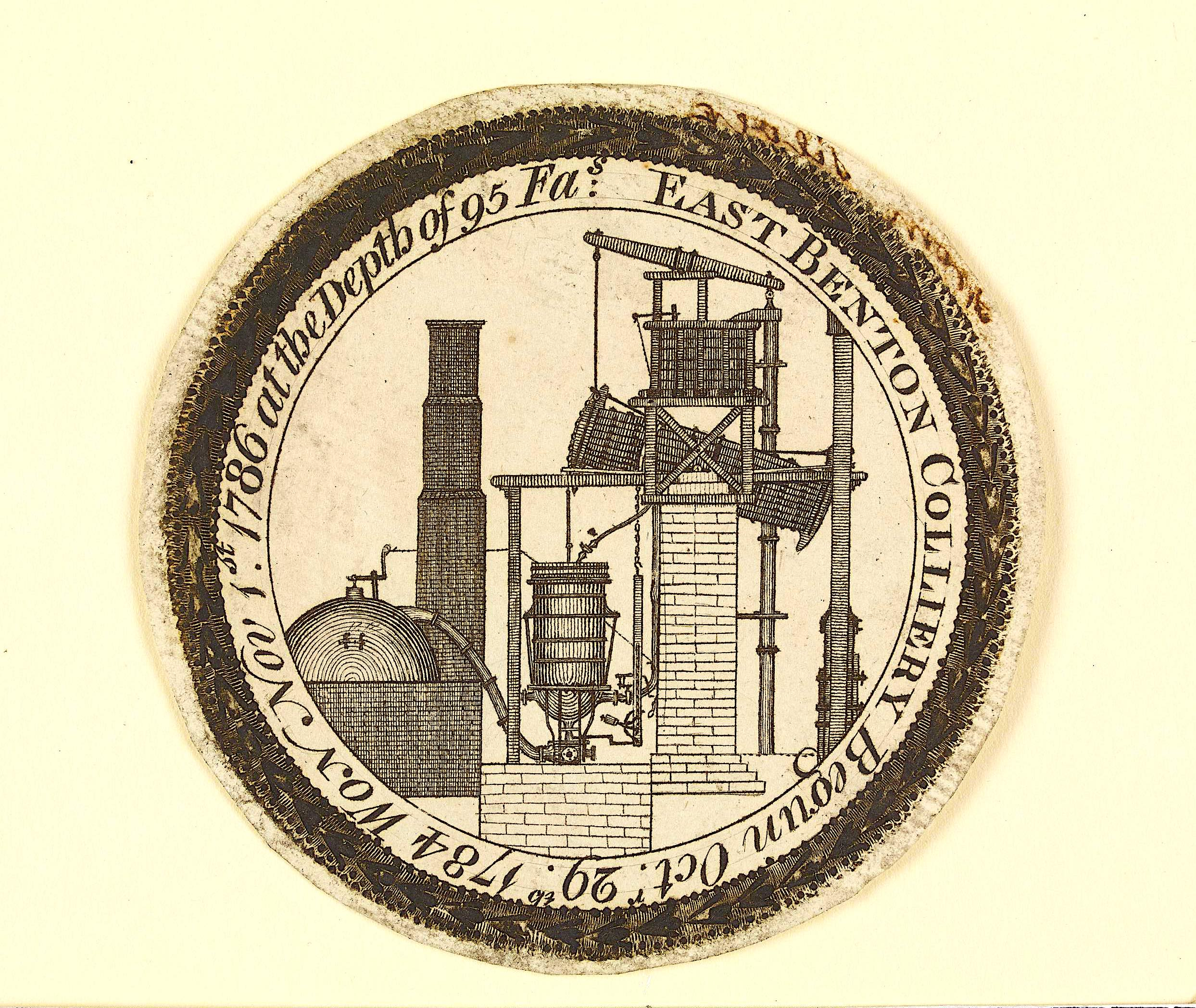
Medal awarded to Matthew Tubman, "master sinker", for winning East Benton Colliery, 1786 (British Museum)

Winning coal is making it accessible for extraction, and in this district it required heavy investment with no guarantee of a return. In The Coal-Mines of the North of England (1846) David T. Ansted, professor of geology at King's College London, wrote:

The depth of the sinkings is enormous, being rarely less than 150 fathoms [275 m], and sometimes upwards of 300. The competition amongst the various proprietors is very great, and the expense of sinking such deep shafts, often through untried ground and with a vast body of water pouring from quicksands, is so enormous, that there seems no hope of adding very considerably to the number of shafts in each mine

which made for severe ventilation problems.

If the shaft-sinking struck water-bearing sands it could become a serious emergency. In sinking the shaft for Murton Colliery (1838) a torrent of nearly 10,000 gallons (45 tons) of water a minute rushed in, and had to be pumped up 540 feet (165 metres) to the surface, requiring the combined power of 39 steam-engine boilers, before workmen could safely tub off the shaft with cast iron.

==== Pumping and lifting ====
The main problem was seepage water in the mines, however. In deep mines it was necessary to pump it up, which required a source of power. A common misunderstanding is that mines were pumped by horse power until steam engines were invented. They sometimes were, but hydraulic power was more effective than either. For this to work, though, a large catchment area was needed to collect enough run-off water to drive the wheels (called coal mills); the necessity favoured large landholdings. By 1800 mine ownership in the north east was much more concentrated than in other parts of England. Even so, the region was one of the first to adopt the Newcomen steam engine, and it installed many, some for pumping water to waterwheels.

Prime movers

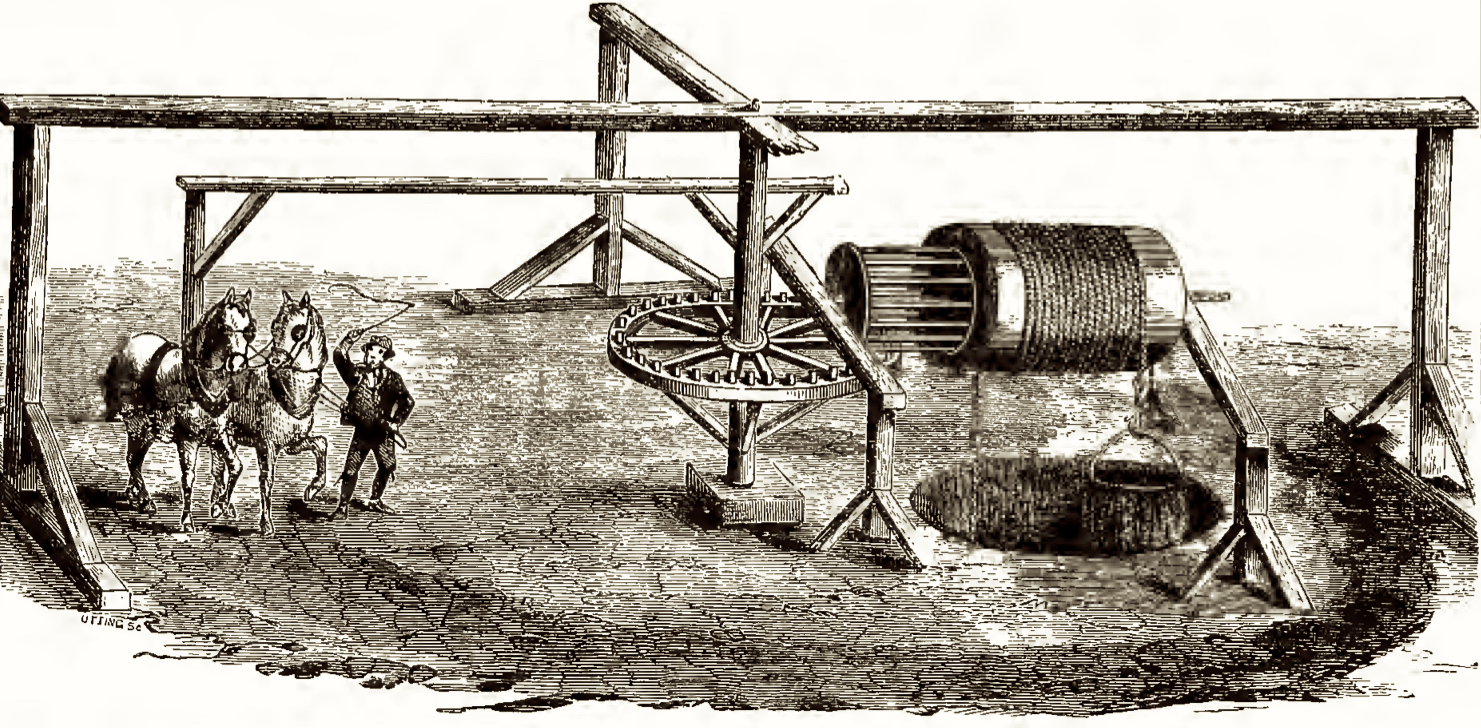
1. Animal power

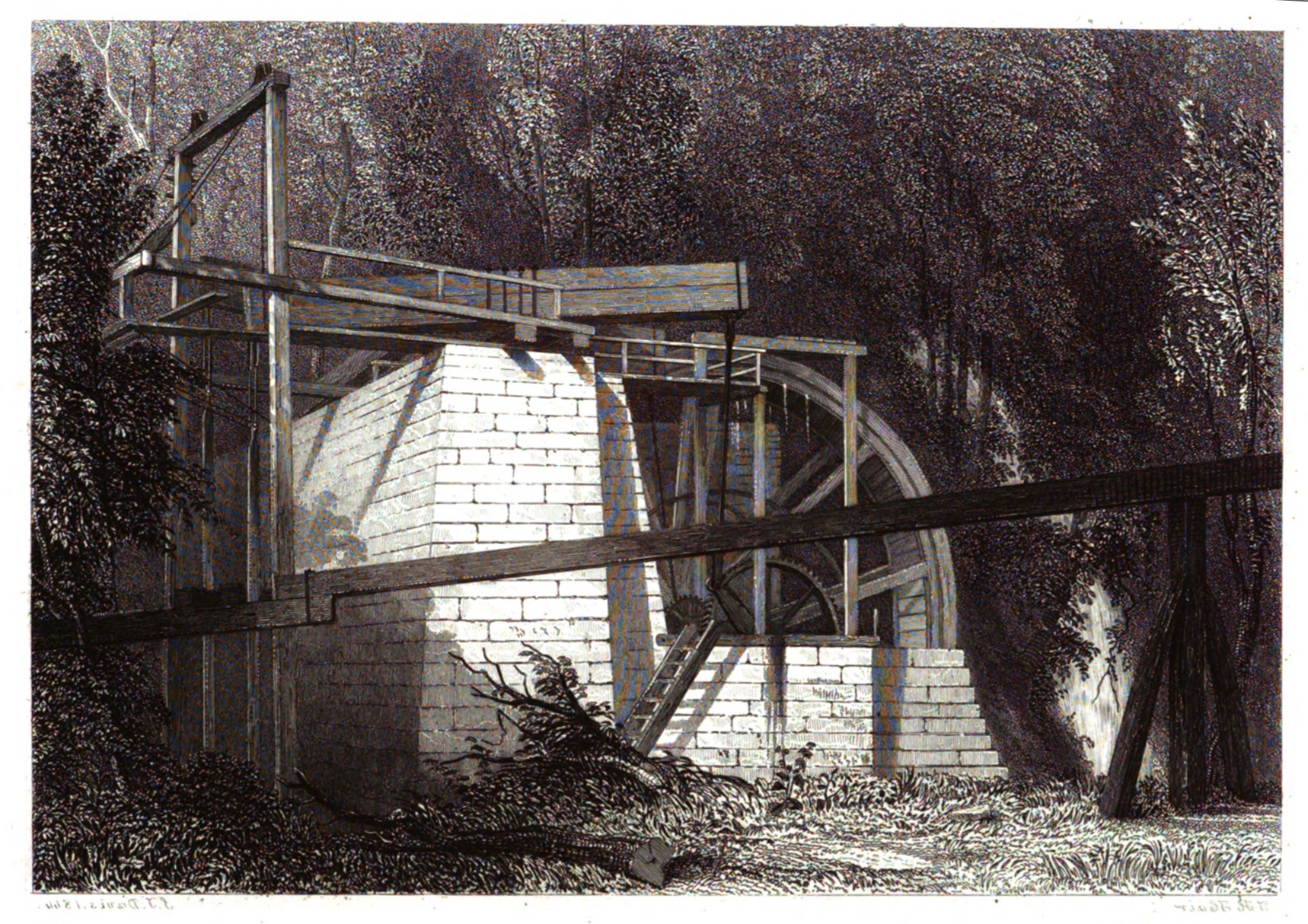
2. Water power

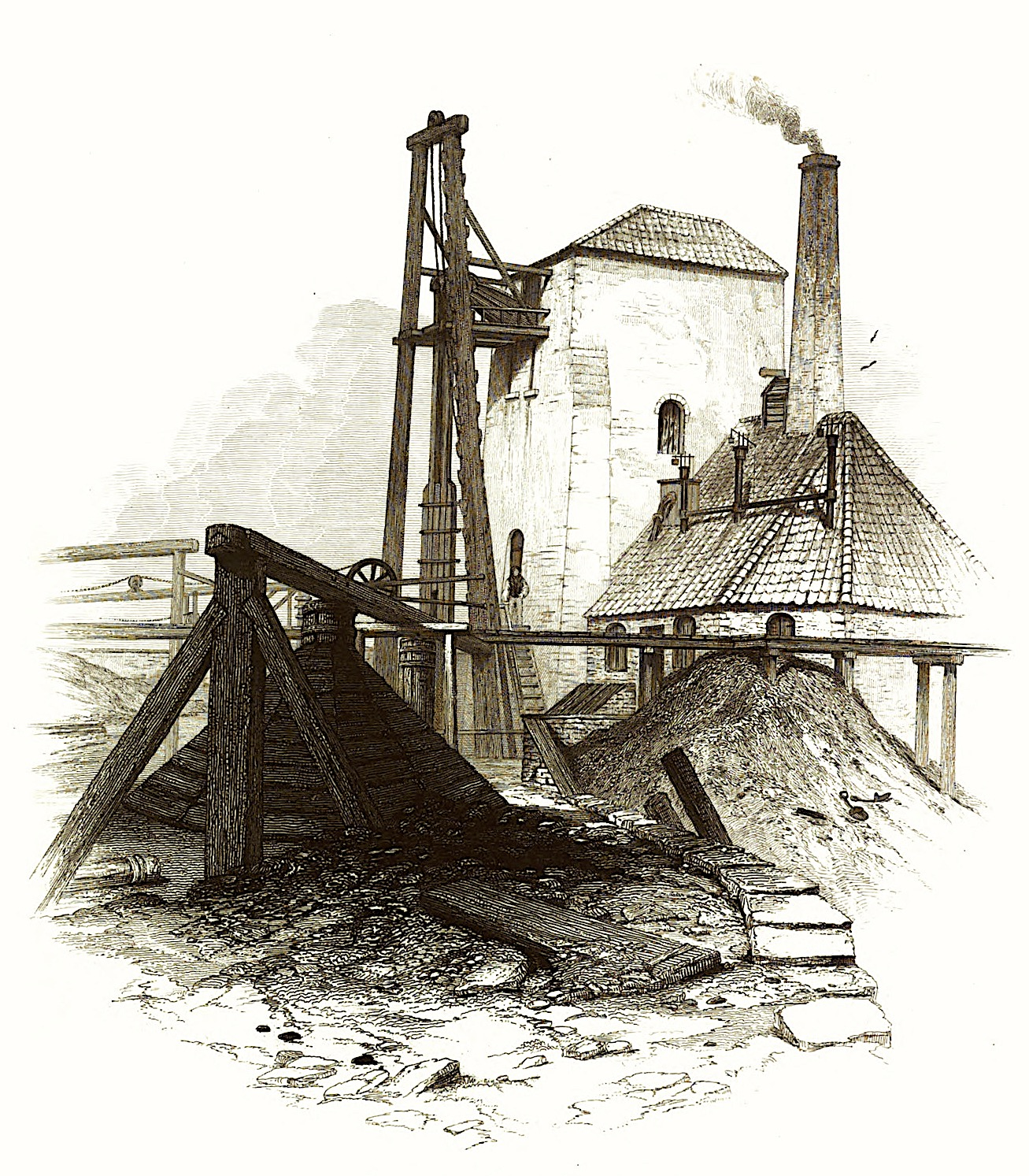
3. Steam

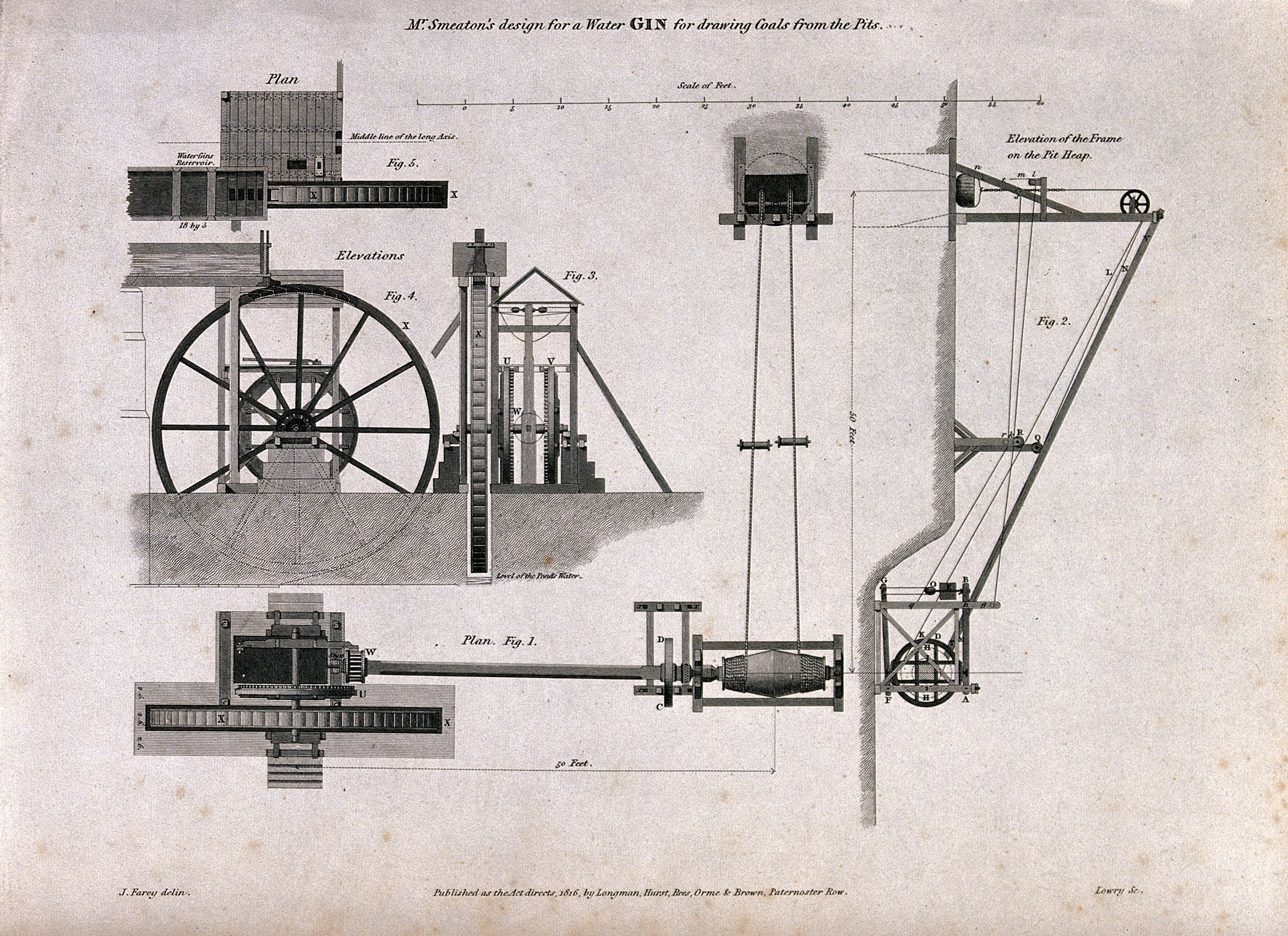
4. Hybrid

1. Horse-driven cog and rung winding machine. Early machines could be built by local millwrights. "In the Walker colliery in 1765, the deepest mine at that point at 600 feet, coal was lifted from the mine by a gin powered by 8 horses". At that depth the rope weighed more than the load of coal.
2. Coal mill. For driving mine pumps, these water-powered prime movers were more effective than early steam engines and much more so than horses (Beamish Colliery: T.H. Hair, 1844, Views of the Collieries of Northumberland and Durham ).
3. Pumping engine at Friar's Goose Colliery, Gateshead (Hair, Views). Deep mining required heavy investment.
4. John Smeaton's water gin, Long Benton Colliery, 1777. Early steam engines were too jerky to drive the winding gear, so they pumped water to overshot wheels, which turned it smoothly. (Wellcome Collection: J. Farey, eng. Lowry)

==== Ventilation ====
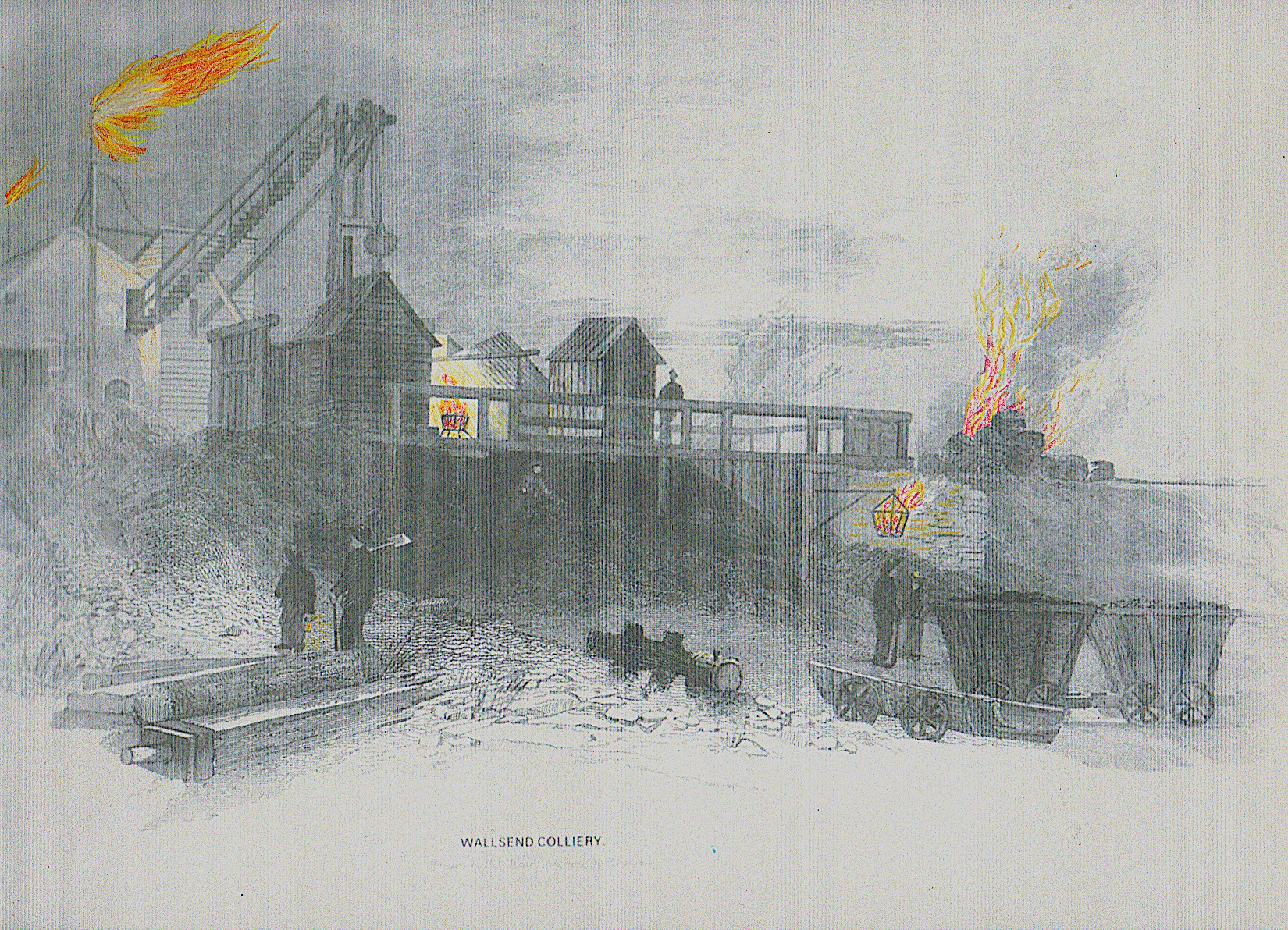
Fiery mine at night. Venting a permanent, "roaring" flame of methane at Wallsend colliery, scene of fatal explosions. (T.H. Hair, 1844, Views.)

The mines being deep and the coal bituminous, explosive gas became a serious problem, and until 1815 had to be dealt with by improved ventilation alone since miners had no practical way of illuminating their work except by the light of a naked flame. The method of getting coal in this district was pillar and stall mining, in which the mineral is extracted by cutting a grid of intersecting passageways, leaving thick pillars of coal to support the roof. Besides yielding coal, those passageways were essential for ventilation because, if they were obstructed — even in abandoned sidings — explosive pockets of gas might accumulate and endanger the whole mine; this was appreciated by 1760. Thus, until safety lamps were introduced (see below), a third if not one half of the coal could not be extracted, but had to be left as part of the mine's structure.

Ventilation was achieved by heating air in a furnace and letting it rise in the upcast shaft, thus creating a strong vertical current. A system of closing doors, called coursing, directed the airflow in a sinuous path through all parts of the mine; but since the pathway might easily be 30 miles long, sometimes as much as 50–70 miles, the current was sluggish, and became dangerously contaminated. An important breakthrough was to divide the air into many parallel currents. Called splitting, it was devised by John Buddle at the Hebburn colliery, and it greatly improved the air's freshness and intensity. A dumb drift allowed potentially explosive air to escape without dangerously feeding the furnace fire.

==== Illumination ====
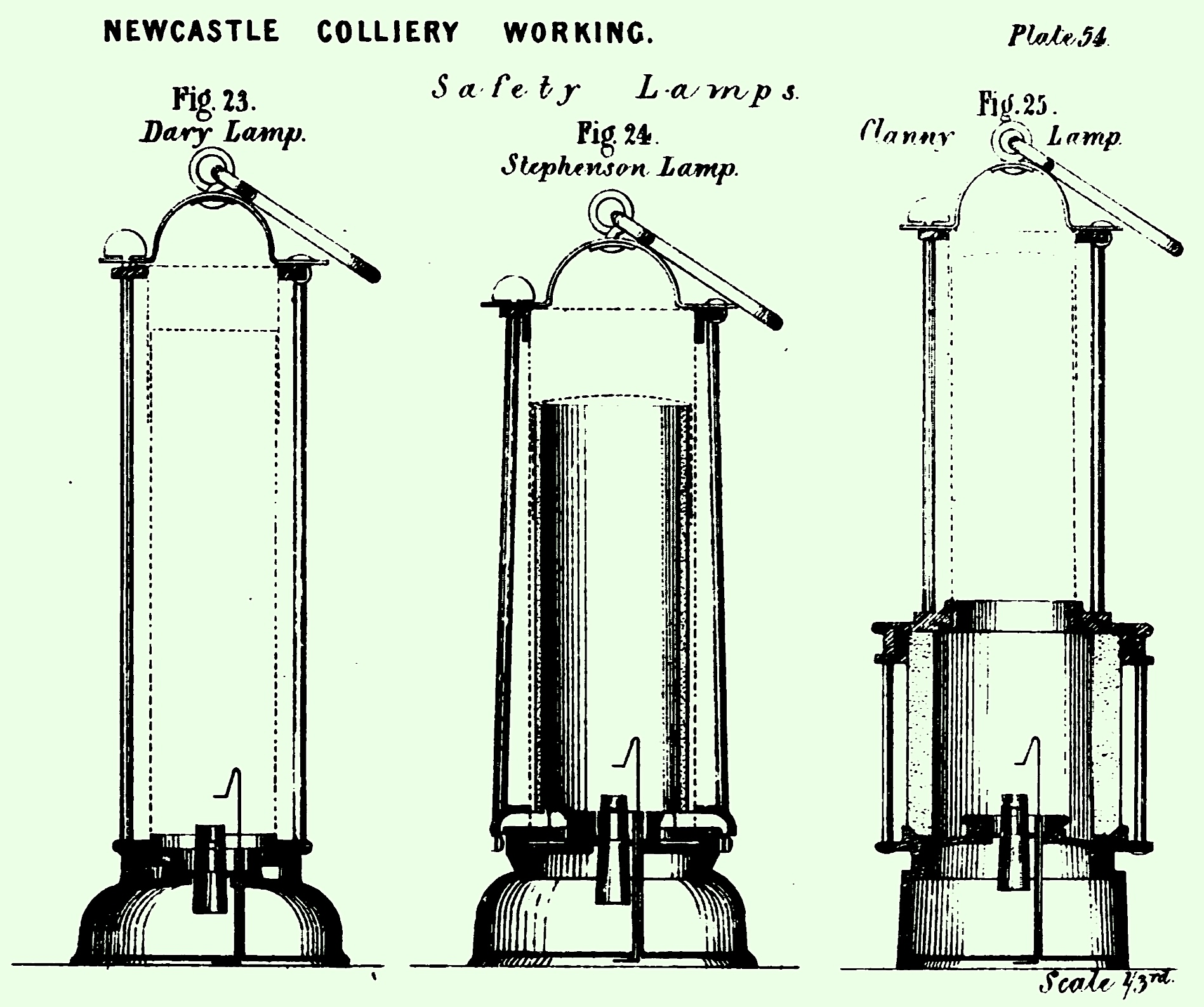
Miners' safety lamps were first used im the north east coalfield and revolutionised coal mining

The north east introduced the first practical safety lamps. Following the Felling mine disaster of 1812, the Society in Sunderland for Preventing Accidents in Coal Mines, in which John Buddle was influential, encouraged investigators to tackle the problem of explosions. Three of these, William Reid Clanny, George Stephenson and Humphry Davy, independently came up with safety lamps, converging on a solution where the flame was shielded by a gauze. They were in use by 1816. The term "safety" was relative, since the lamps were dangerous if incautiously used.

Nevertheless, they produced "an entire revolution" in mining.

It was now no longer necessary [said Nicholas Wood] to preserve the ventilation so as to render all parts of the workings safe with naked lights. Pillars could be removed to any extent so far as ventilation was concerned... Collieries which had been partially worked and abandoned for years as unworkable to any further extent, and in which about one third of the coal was left, were then reopened, and the entire pillars removed.

Millions of tons of 'lost' coal were recovered.

==== Panel working ====
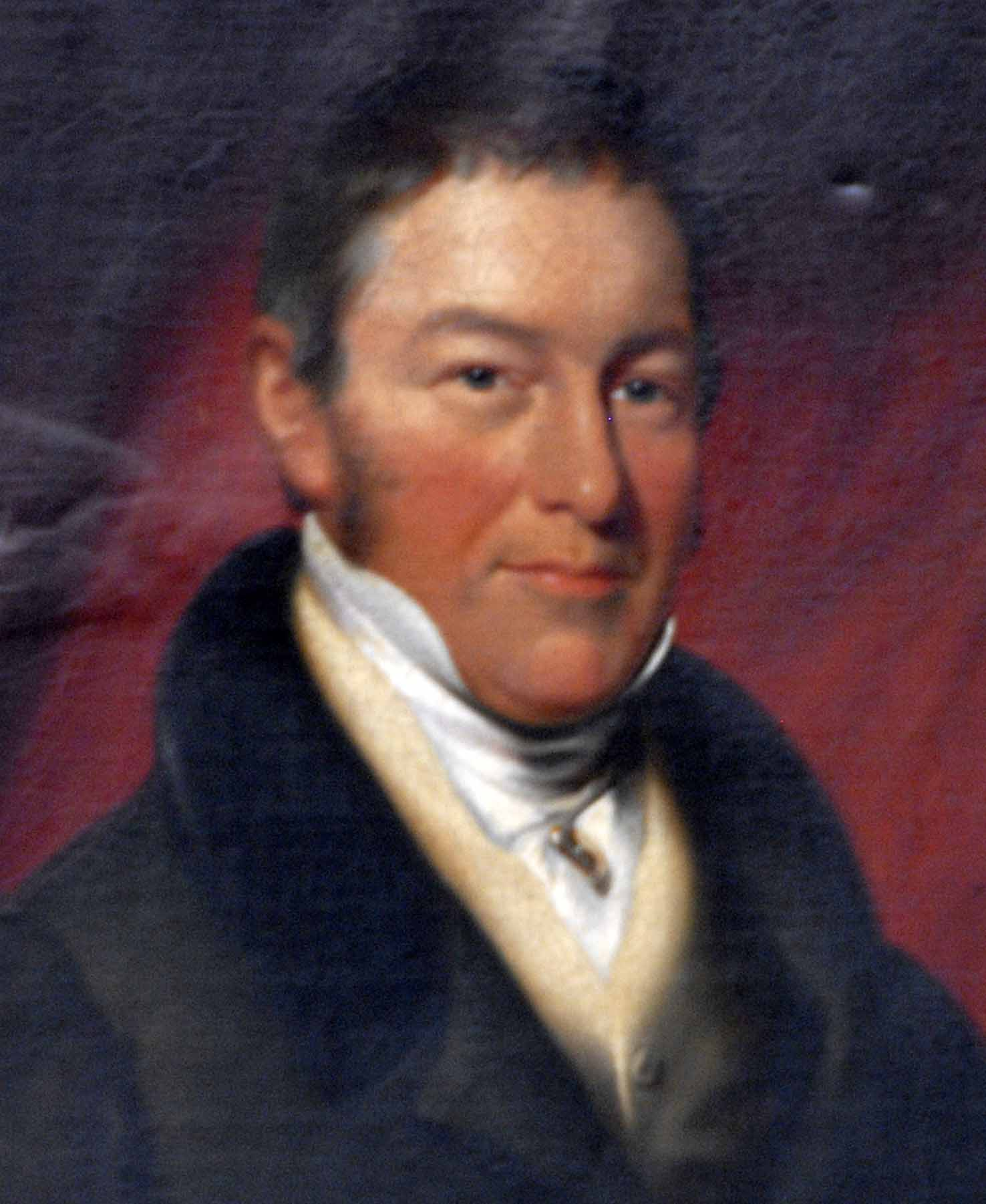
John Buddle (1773–1843), "the greatest mining engineer" of his day, entered the pits at the age of six. (The Mining Institute.)

The new methods brought new challenges. Removing some coal pillars put extra stress on the rest, which were gradually crushed by the weight of the roof; or the floor buckled. A condition called creep or crush developed, which slowly spread as a chain reaction through the district, damaging the coal and, once started, very difficult to stop. John Buddle, regarded as the greatest mining engineer of his day, solved the problem by inventing panel working, which is still used. The district is divided into panels, isolated by barrier pillars which are wide enough to support the roof and prevent creep. Interior pillars may then be robbed out.

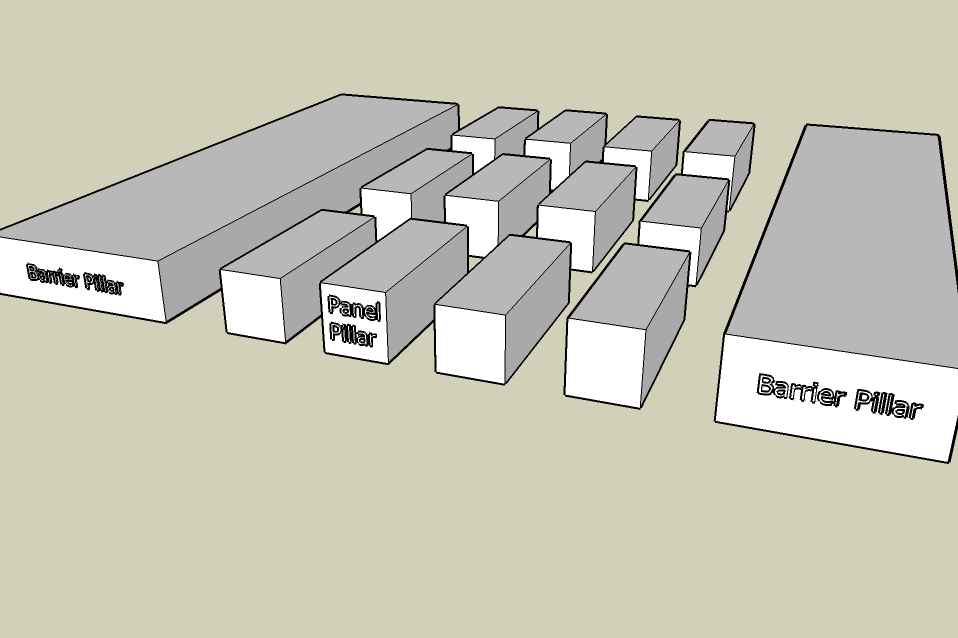
Panel working (concept). Barrier pillars prevent lateral spread of crush when panel pillars are removed.

=== Rail transport technology ===
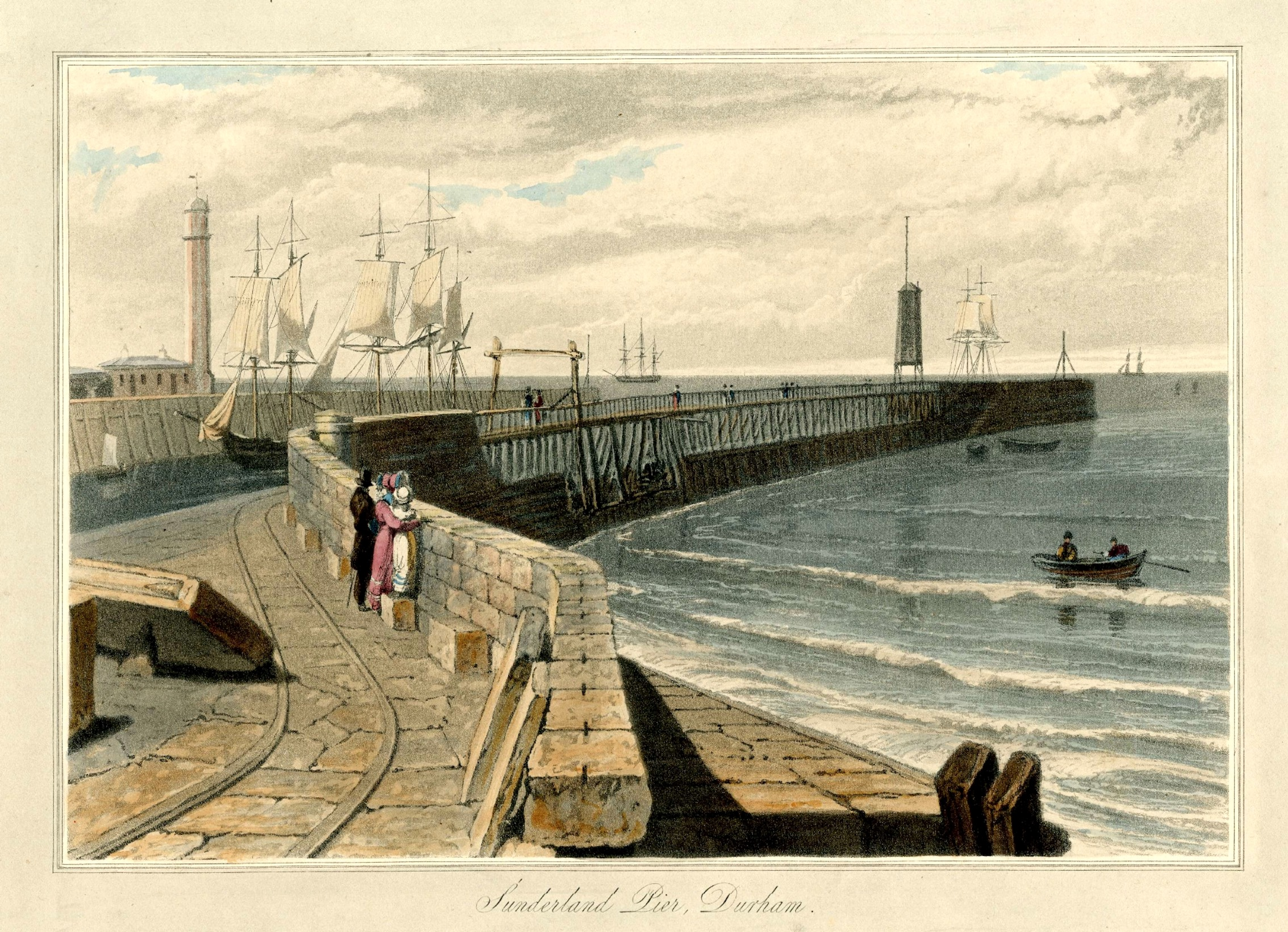
Sunderland Pier, Durham, 1822 aquatint, (William Daniell, British Museum). Notice railway and sailing collier.

The north east has been described as the native land of railways. "From about 1620 to 1820 the northern coal-field was the theatre of experiments which culminated in the formation of the Stockton and Darlington Railway". Even George Stephenson's standard gauge, now used from America to China, originated from the rail separation used at his employer the Killingworth Colliery, Northumberland. These early railways were used for carrying coal from mine to tideway, and most were less than five miles long. By 1800 there were perhaps 150 miles of line in Tyneside alone. They originated as follows.

Each mine had a staith, a wooden staging projecting out in to the river where coal could be stored. As mines were sunk further and further from the rivers, they confronted the problem of getting their coals from the pit-head to the staith without incurring ruinous expense.

A horse can pull much more on a very even surface. Mines invested in waggonways, at first nothing more than parallel wooden rails on sleepers upon which horses could draw trucks. Metal wheels, internally flanged as now, were in use by 1774. Later, and progressively, rails were surfaced with iron strips to reduce wear; cast solid; laid on edge instead of flat; made of malleable iron. Brakes were improved, hence waggons could be run together as trains. Sometimes gravity was substituted for horse power (self-acting inclined planes: the downward force of the loaded waggons pulled the "empties" up the hill again). Where need be, stationary steam engines pulled cables (1808). Eventually steam engines moved themselves. North-easterners discovered that locomotives could get enough traction from their friction against the rails. Not the world's first public railway, but the first commercially successful one, the 25-mile Stockton and Darlington, carried coals to a hitherto inaccessible river: the Tees.

Waggonways

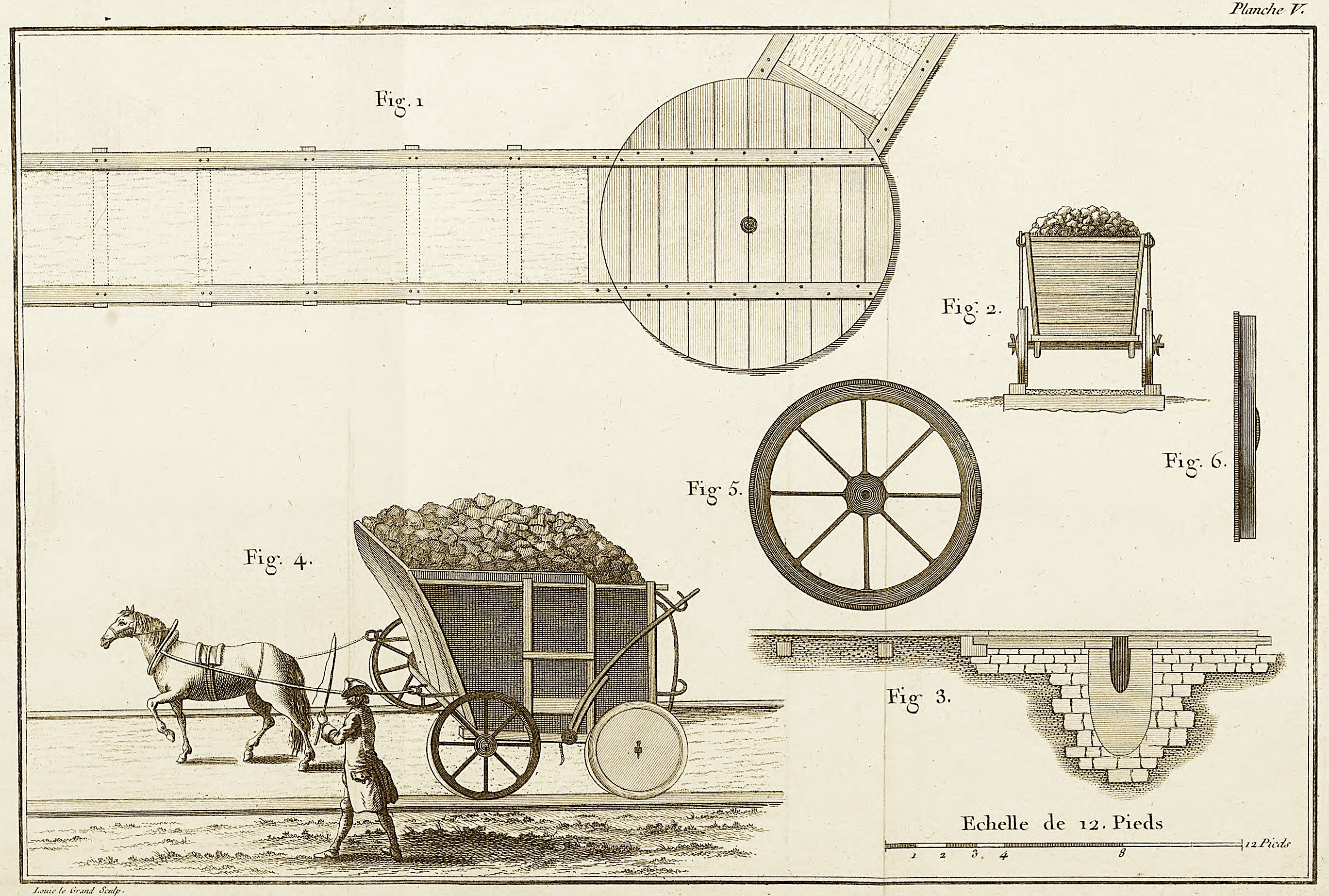
1. Internally flanged wheels by 1774

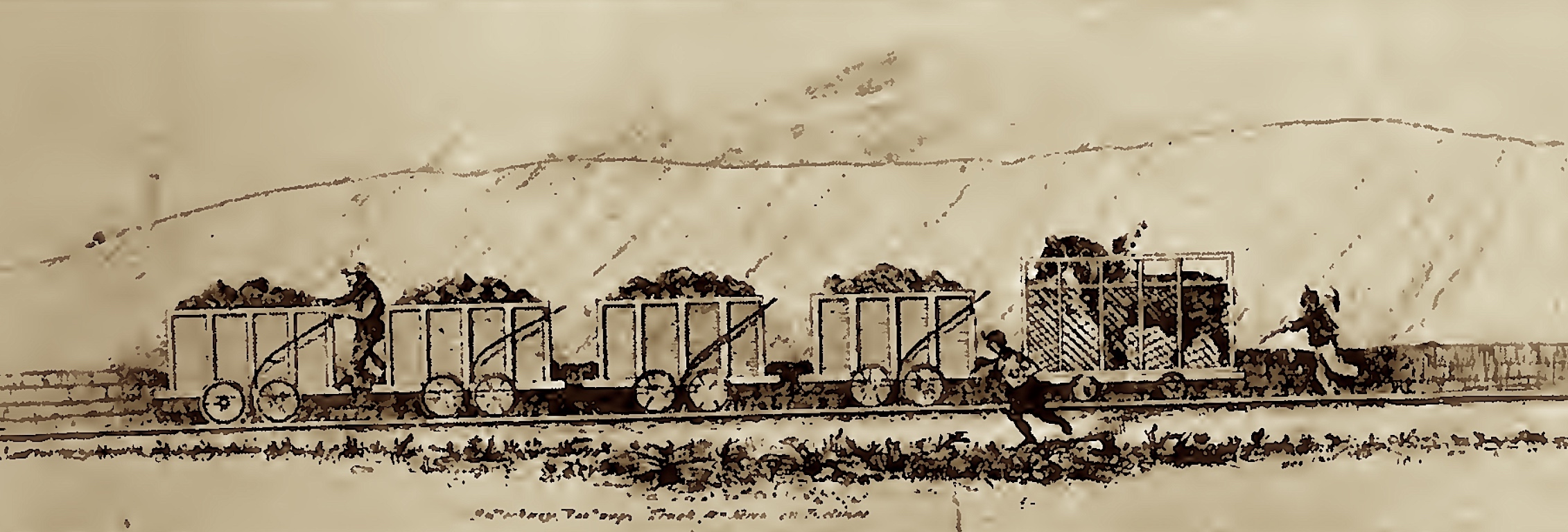
2. A train with a dandy-waggon

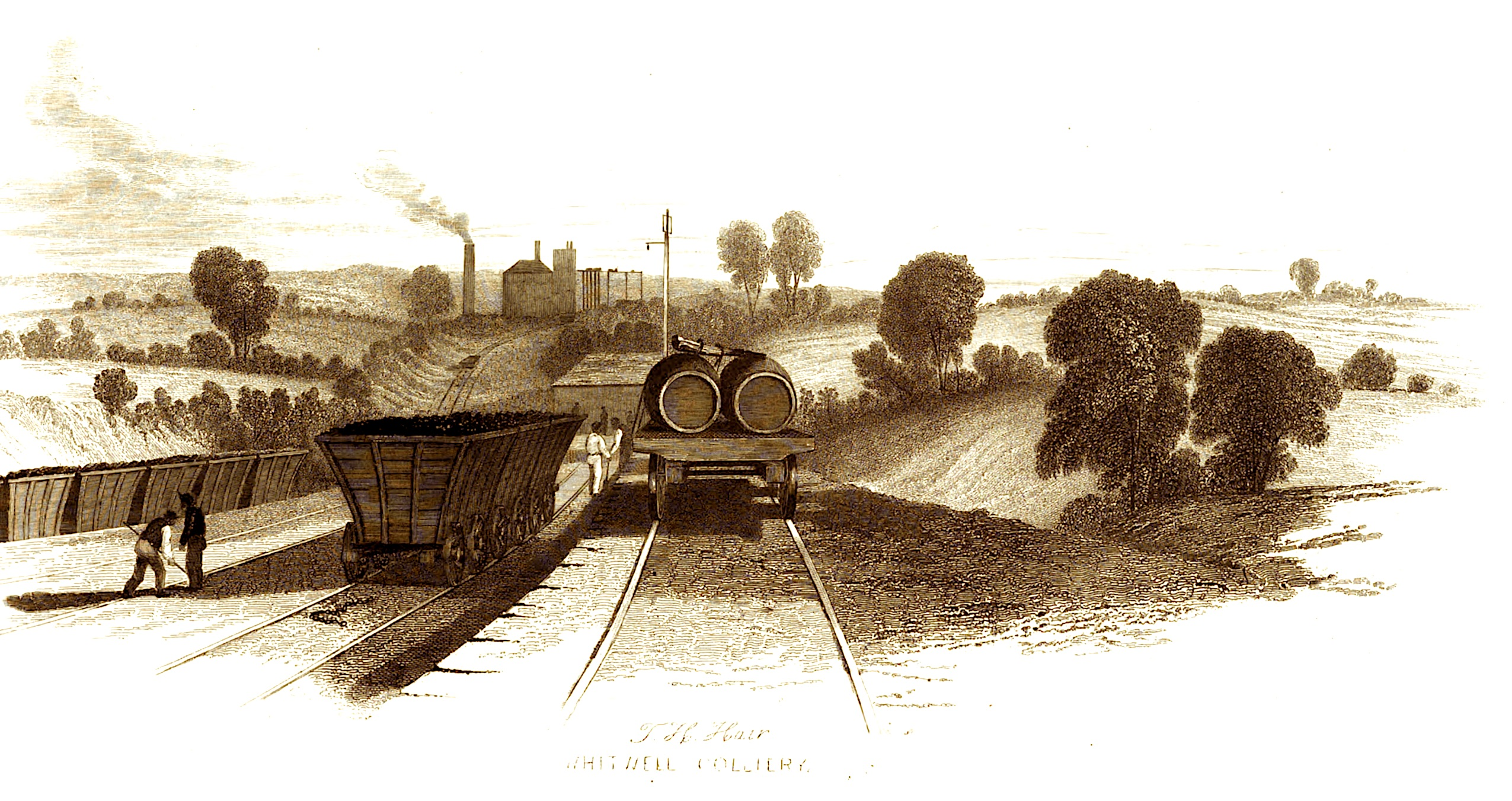
3. Gravity railway

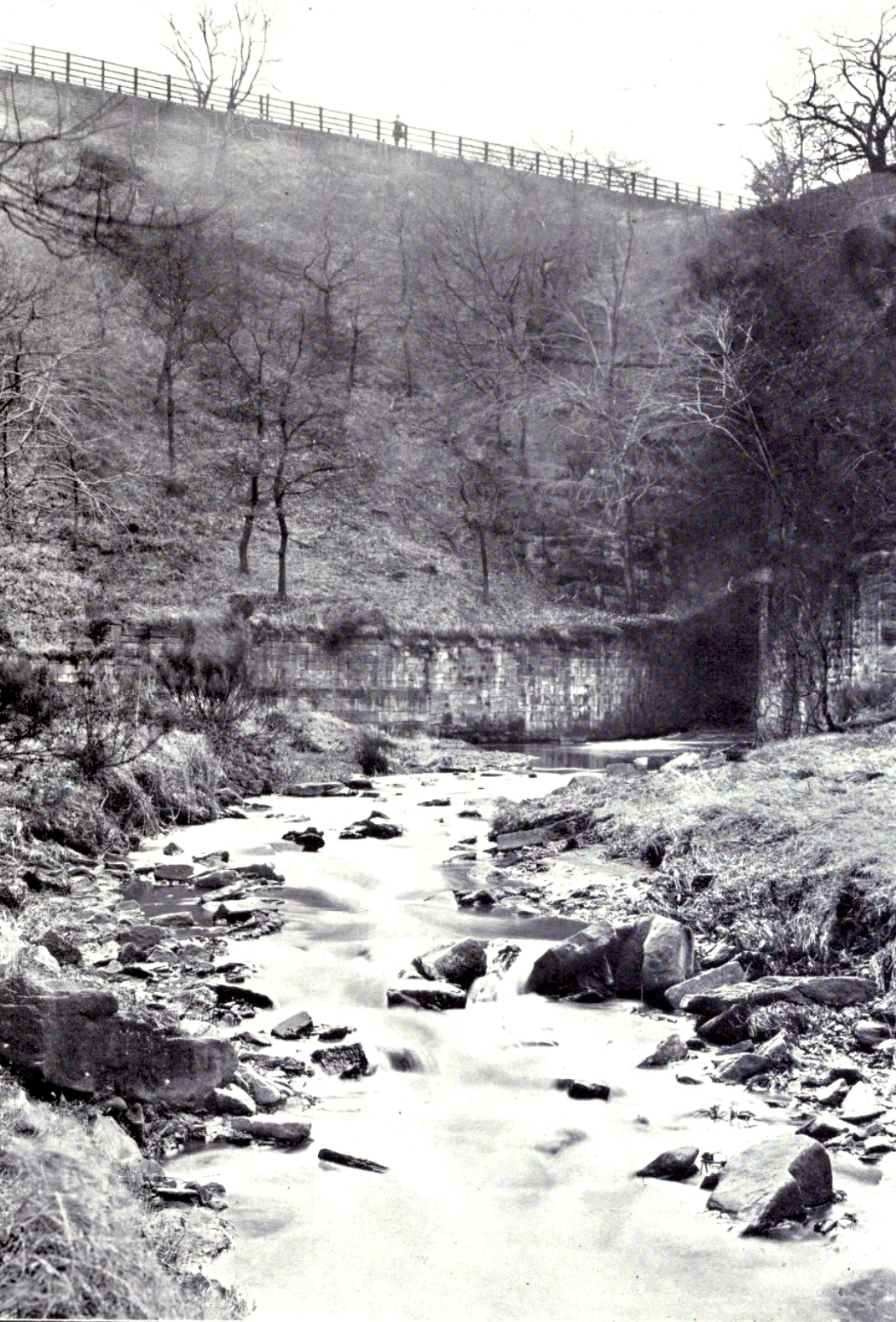
4. First embankment

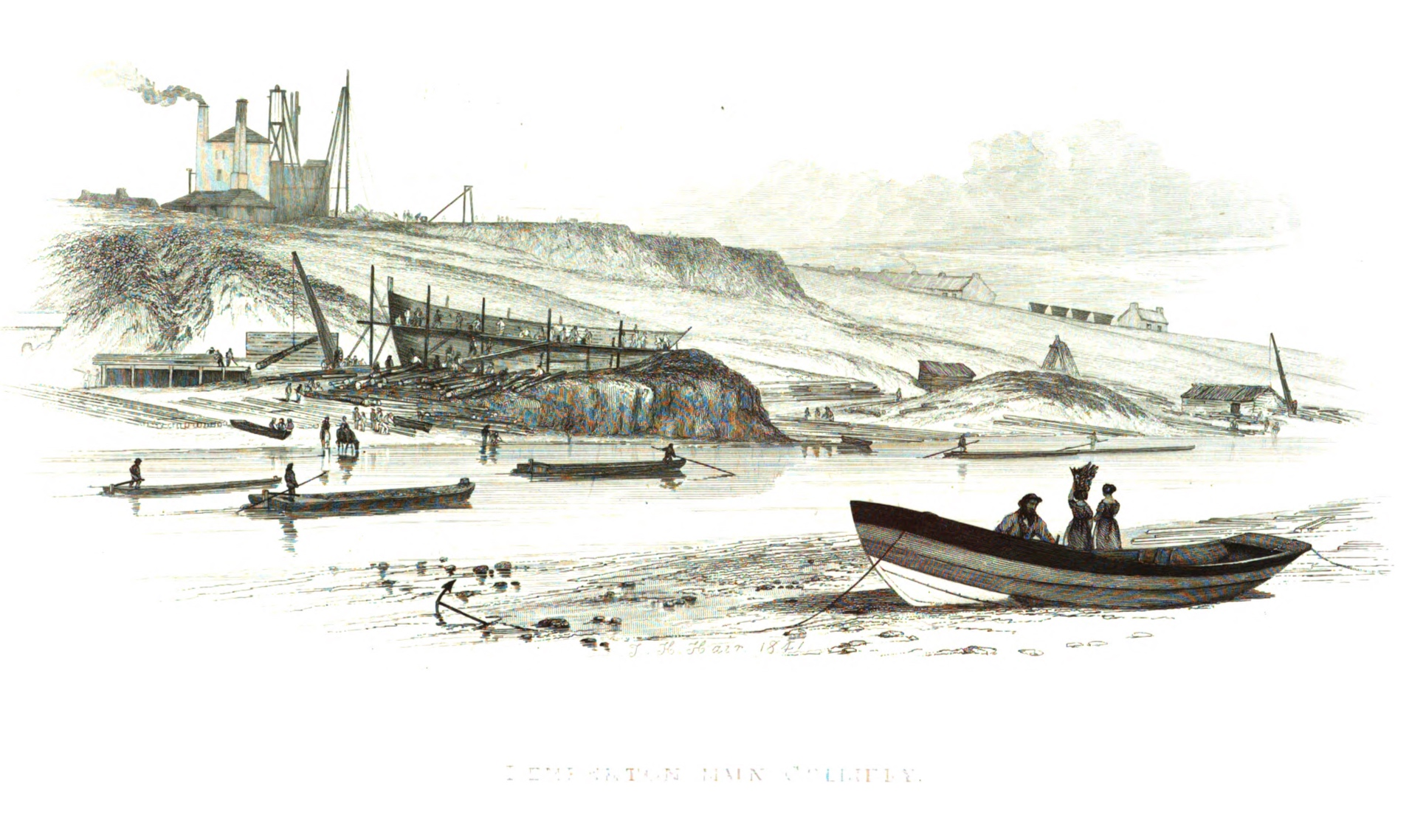
5. Self-acting inclined plane

1. A 1774 drawing by Gabriel Jars of the French Academy of Sciences shows that early Newcastle waggonways had many of the characteristics of modern railways, including metal wheels with internal flanges, rails laid across sleepers, braking, twin tracks and even turntables. (Detail: Notice unequal wheels to counter downhill tipping, back wheels of wood for better braking). By 1795 improvements in braking allowed multiple waggons to be taken downhill as a set — or train.
2. Horse-traction was quite adequate for some of these waggonways, which on the outward journey ran chiefly downhill under gravity. The dandy waggon, an 1826 George Stephenson invention, rested and fed the horse during the gravity runs. The horse knew to trot after the train and jump aboard, which it did avidly. Horse railways continued until 1907.
3. Whitwell Colliery (Hair, Views)
4. The world's oldest railway embankment, 1726, built by the Grand Allies for their horse-drawn waggonway to the Tyne. The Tanfield Railway, a heritage operation, still uses much of this line.
5. Coal waggons (right, in distance) descend an inclined plane by gravity to waiting keelboats on the River Wear. An endless cable (not visible) returns the empties.

==== Steam locomotives ====
The high cost of horse fodder during the Napoleonic wars encouraged mine engineers to experiment with steam locomotion, though at first locomotives were not much stronger than the best horses. When the Stockton & Darlington Railway opened it was not obvious that steam was going to cost less than horse power; the directors therefore chose to use both. Visiting engineers from Prussia reported (1826 or 1827) that although the S & D's locomotives incurred half the running cost of horses, it was still not clear that they were cheaper once repairs to engines, rolling stock and rails were taken into account.

Locomotives

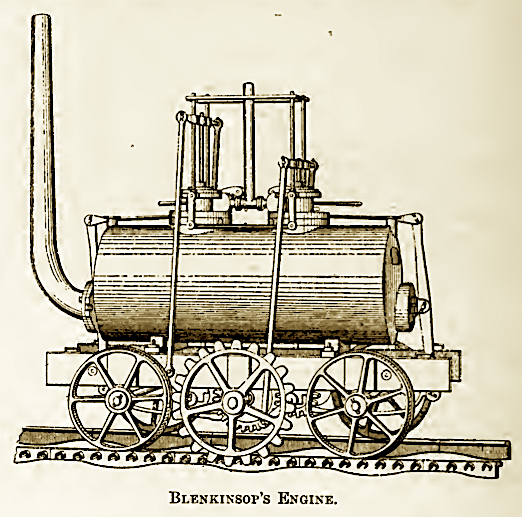
1. John Blenkinsop, 1811

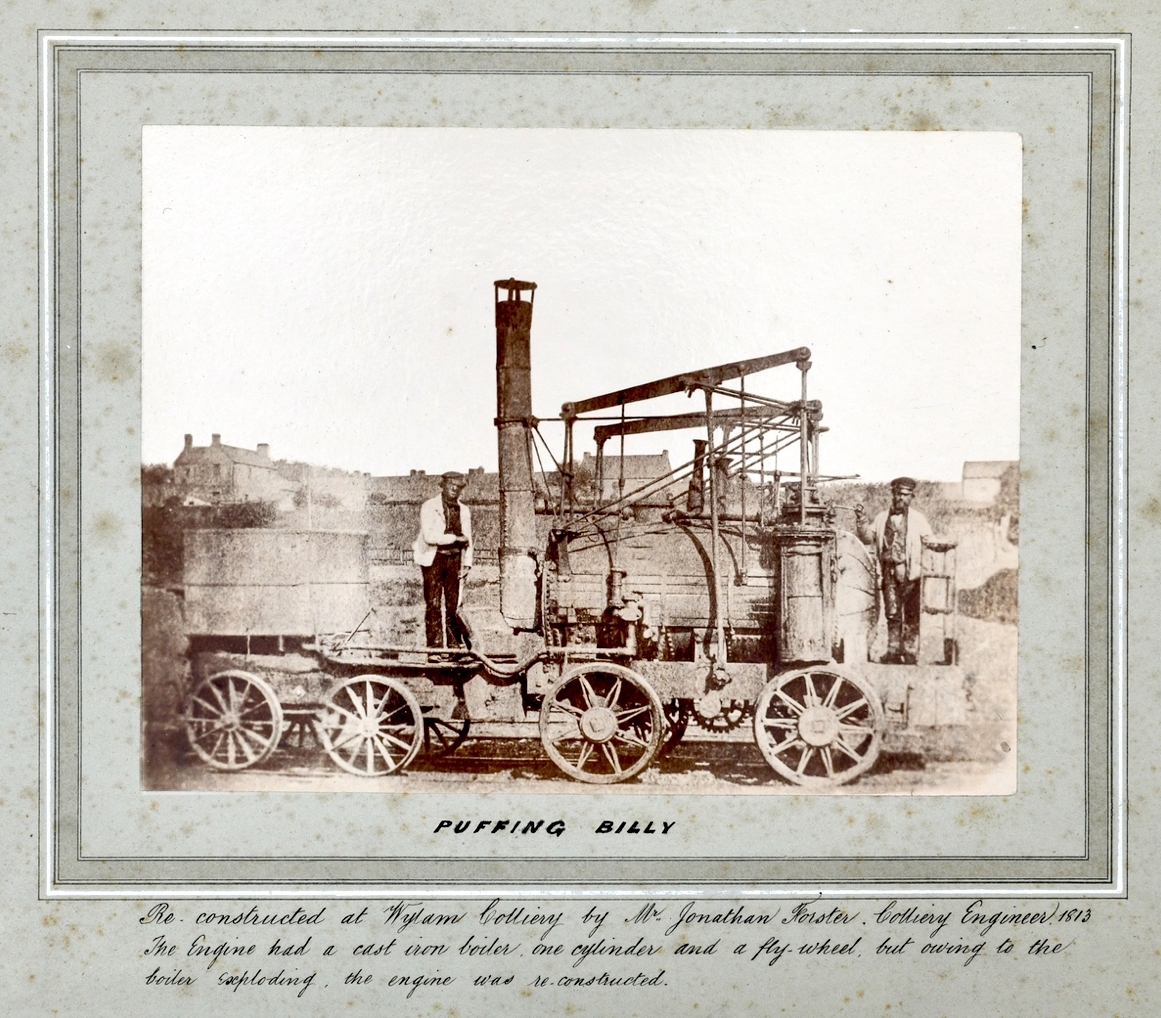
2. William Hedley, 1812

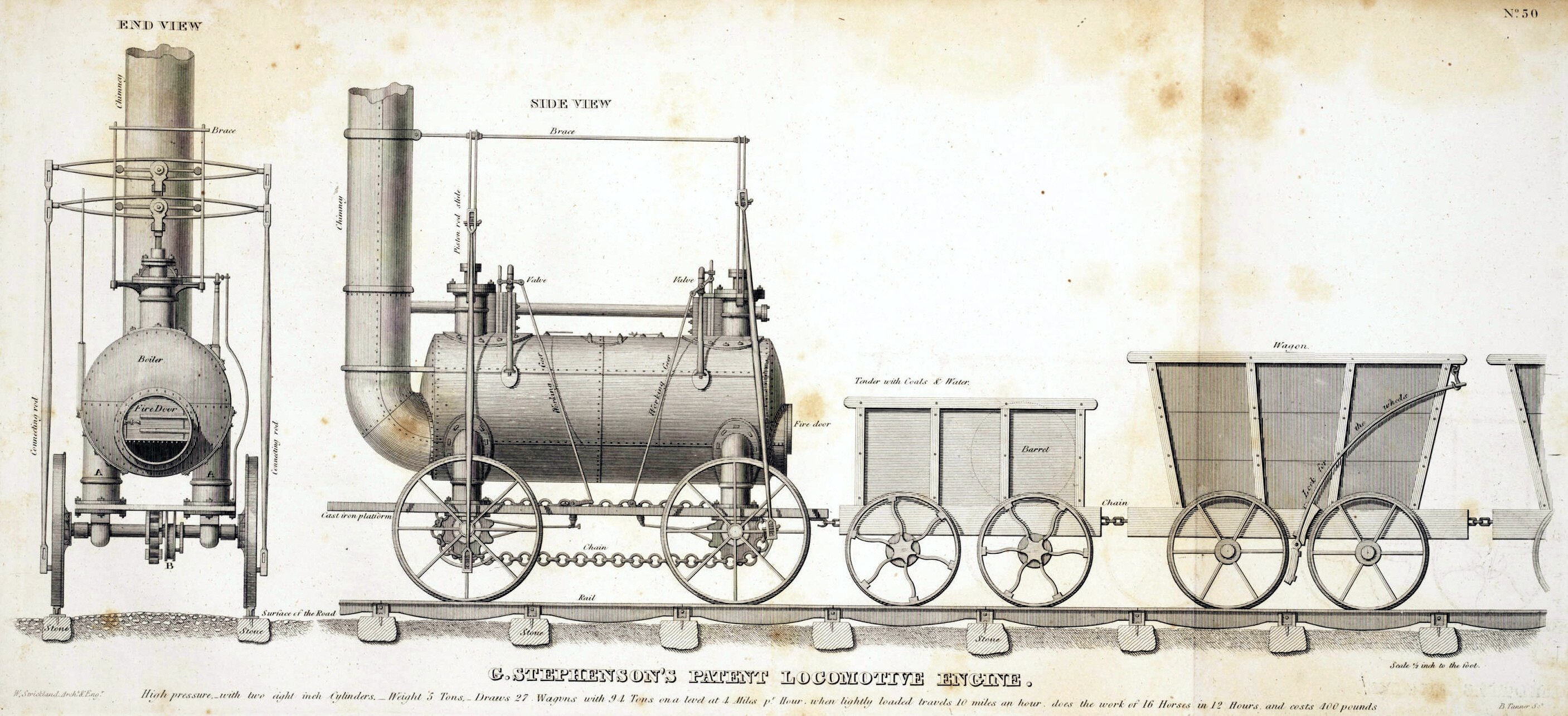
3. George Stephenson, 1814

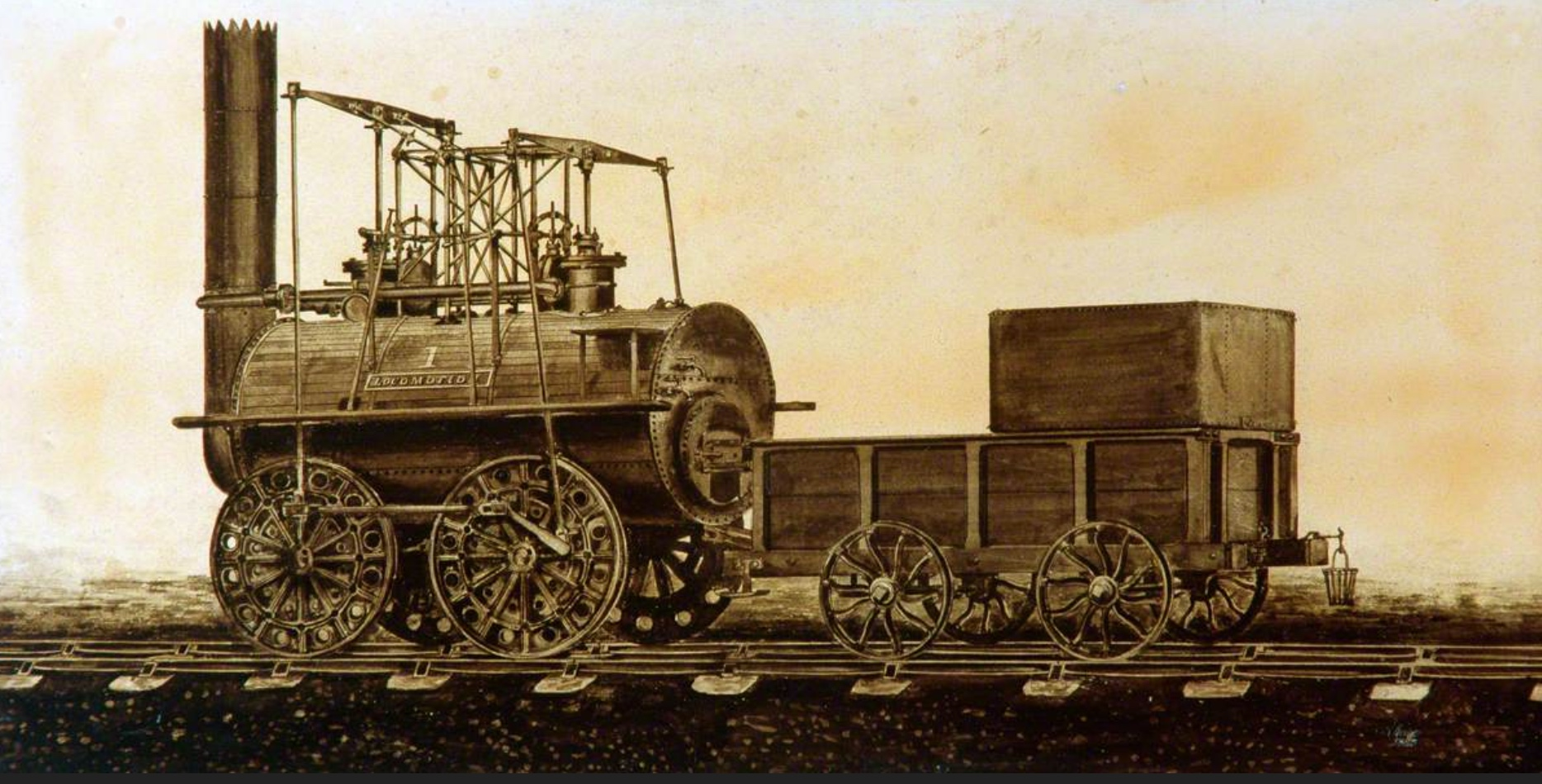
4. Stockton & Darlington Locomotion, 1825

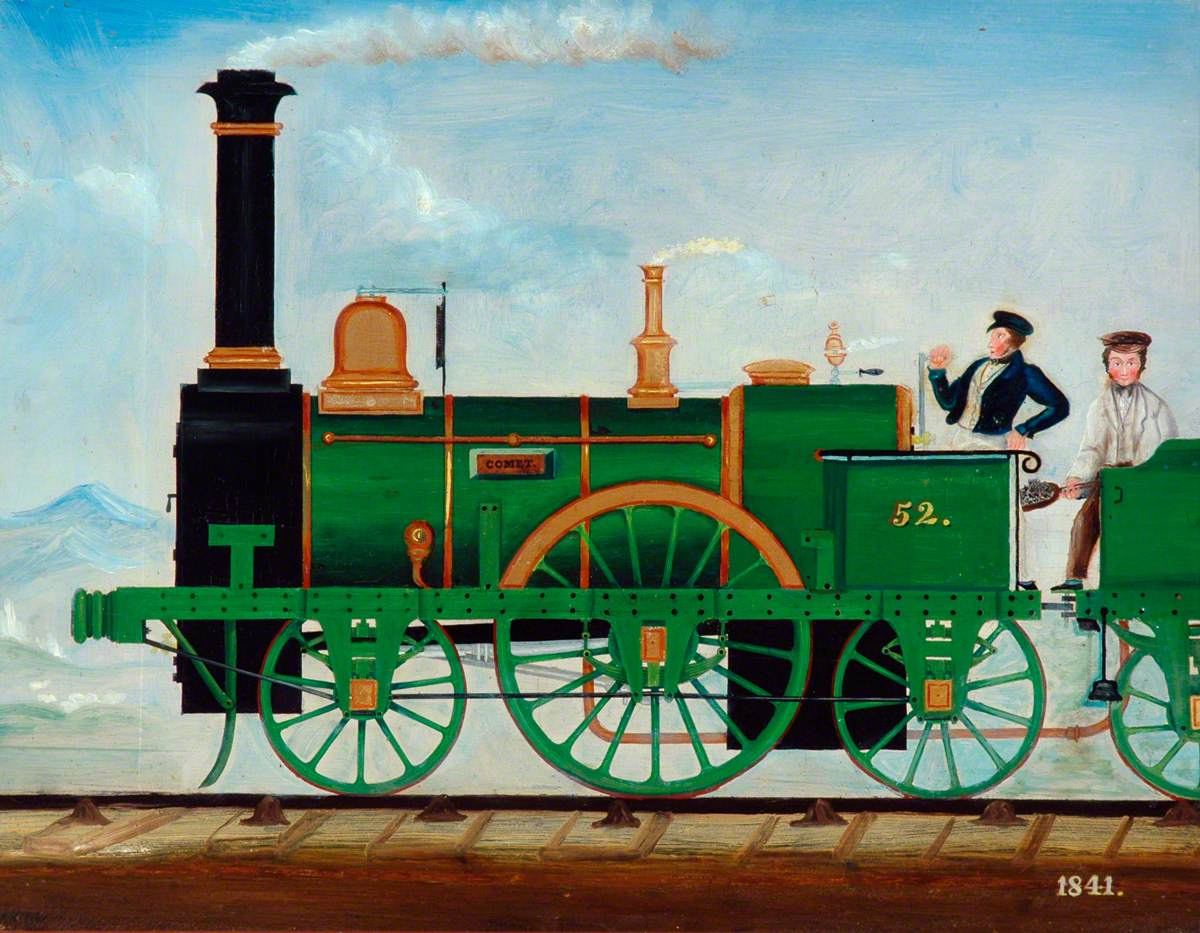
5. S & D Comet, 1841

1. Blenkinsop's rack and pinion engine, described as the first actually useful locomotive.
2. "Puffing Billy", designed by William Hedley at the Wylam Colliery in Northumberland, partly rebuilt 1813, shown in this photograph 1862 still at work, and now on view at the Science Museum, London. (Ironbridge Gorge Museum Trust.)
3. Early locomotives with their weight and vibrations soon broke the rails. Stephenson realised that locomotive and track design had to be integrated. In one model his steam-filled cylinders were arranged to act as shock absorbers ("steam springs"). Notice the "fish belly" rail pattern. This was the locomotive used by the Hetton Colliery (below); its private railway was operative (1822) before the Stockton & Darlington.
4. Locomotive No.1, Locomotion (R. Wake, 1883, oil on canvas, National Railway Museum/Science & Society Picture Library)
5. Stockton and Darlington Railway 2–2–2 Locomotive No. 52 'Comet' (unknown artist, National Railway Museum)

Steam locomotives revolutionised transportation everywhere, but they originated in efforts to carry coal cheaply from mine to first customer.

=== Bulk material handling and transshipment ===
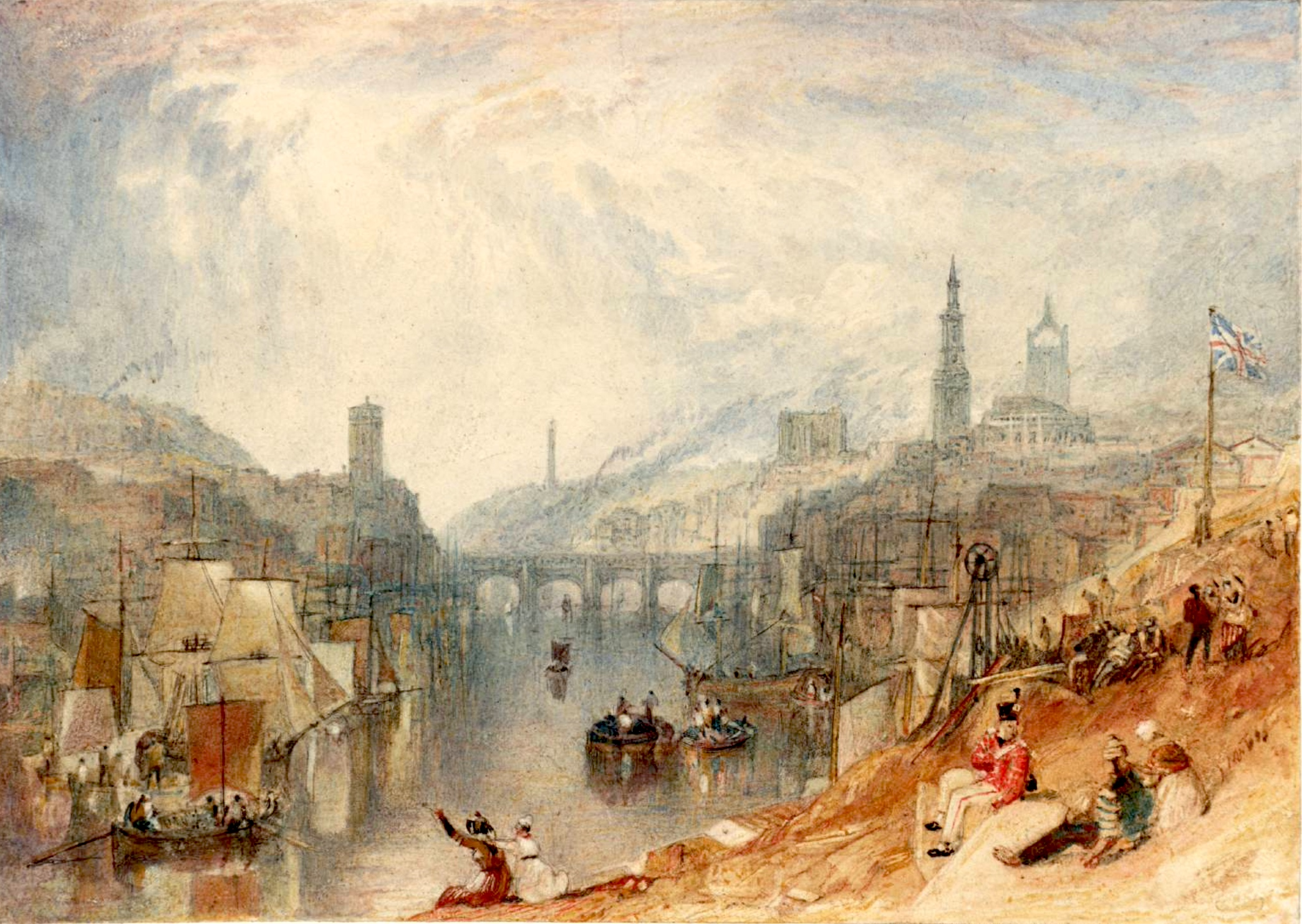
Newcastle-upon-Tyne (J.M.W. Turner, 1823, Tate). Onlookers on a bank of the river Tyne watch a keelboat loading a collier.

The coal having arrived at the riverside, the next phase was to transship it to waiting colliers, the problem being to do it without incurring too much expense and breaking the product in transit (which lowered its market value).

The traditional method was to employ keelboats. These were 21-ton barges, sometimes sailed, but mainly propelled by pushing large poles into the riverbed; the poles were bladed, and also served as steering oars. The four keelmen, having tied up alongside the waiting collier, raised up the lumps of coal with their hands — for which they were entitled to an extra cash payment — and passed them up into her portholes. Shovels, which might have broken the coals, were thus avoided, except for clearing out the residual dust. For every foot that the coal-port was above the gunwale they were entitled to another payment.

All of this was physically demanding. Keelmen were easily the best paid manual workers in the coal industry, according to John Buddle. The mode was therefore expensive.

The north east industry evolved three techniques for reducing labour costs and breakage:-

- spouts
- drops
- tubbing (an early form of containerisation).
Transshipment technology

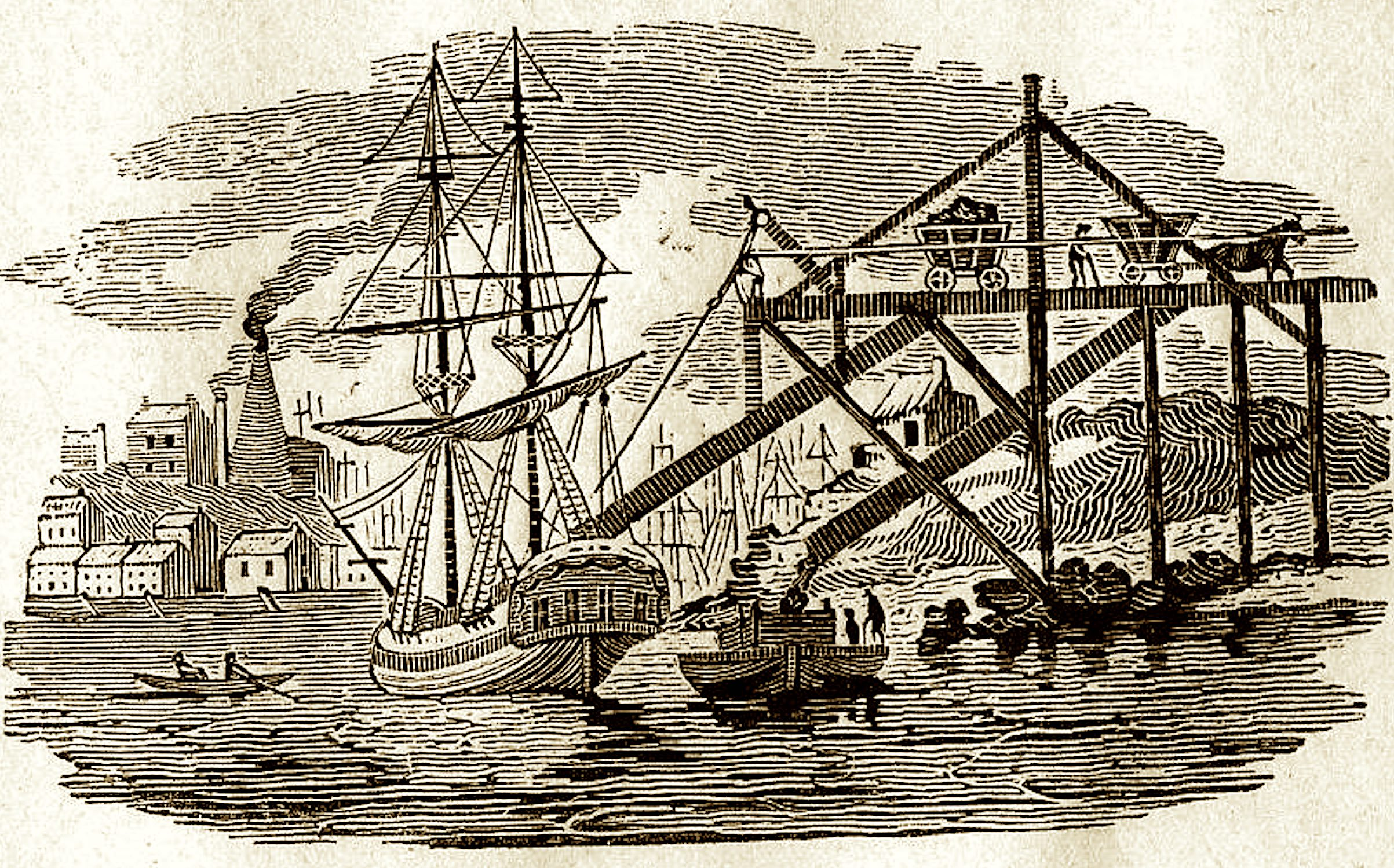
1. Loading by the spout

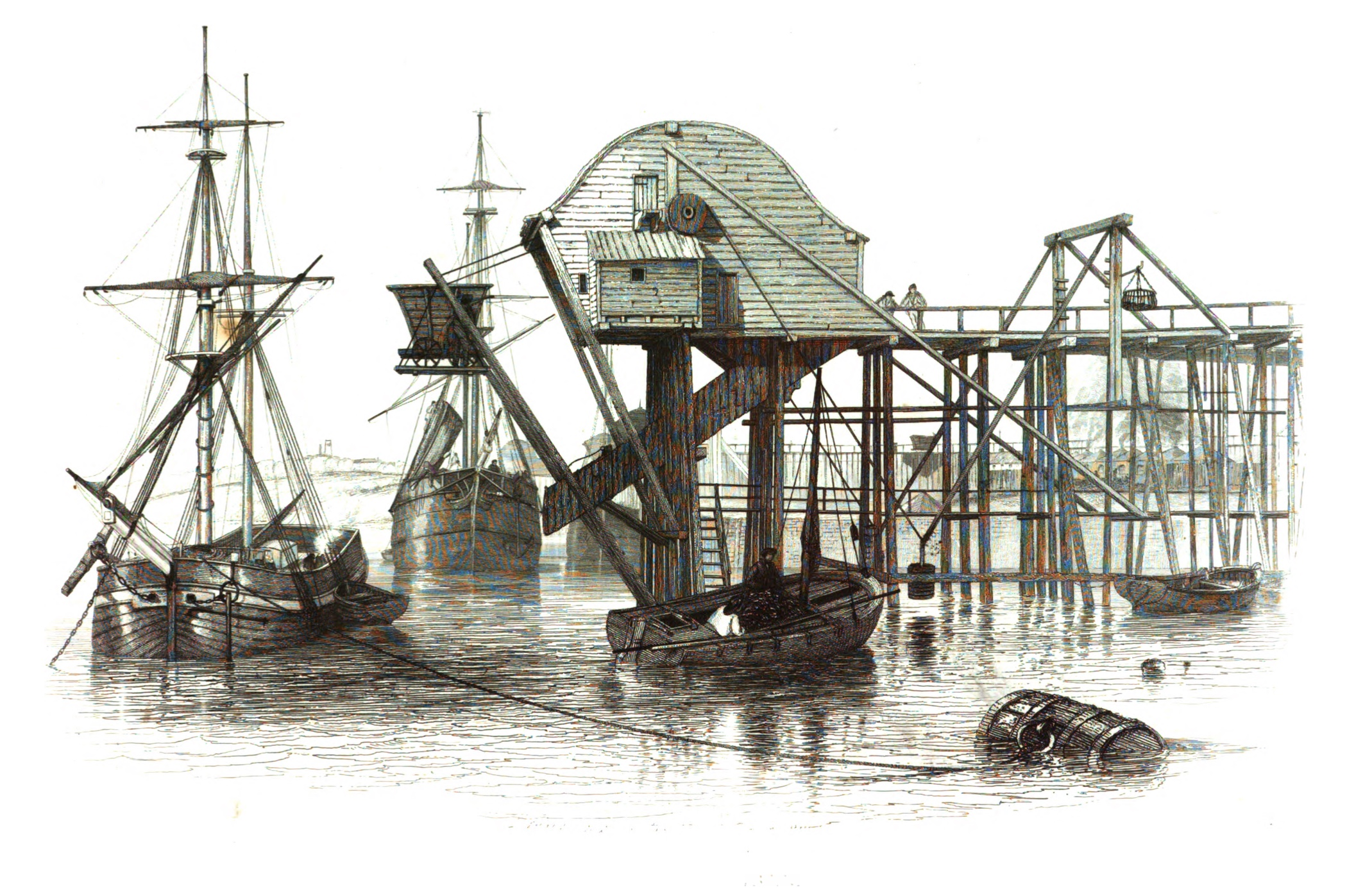
2. Coal drop

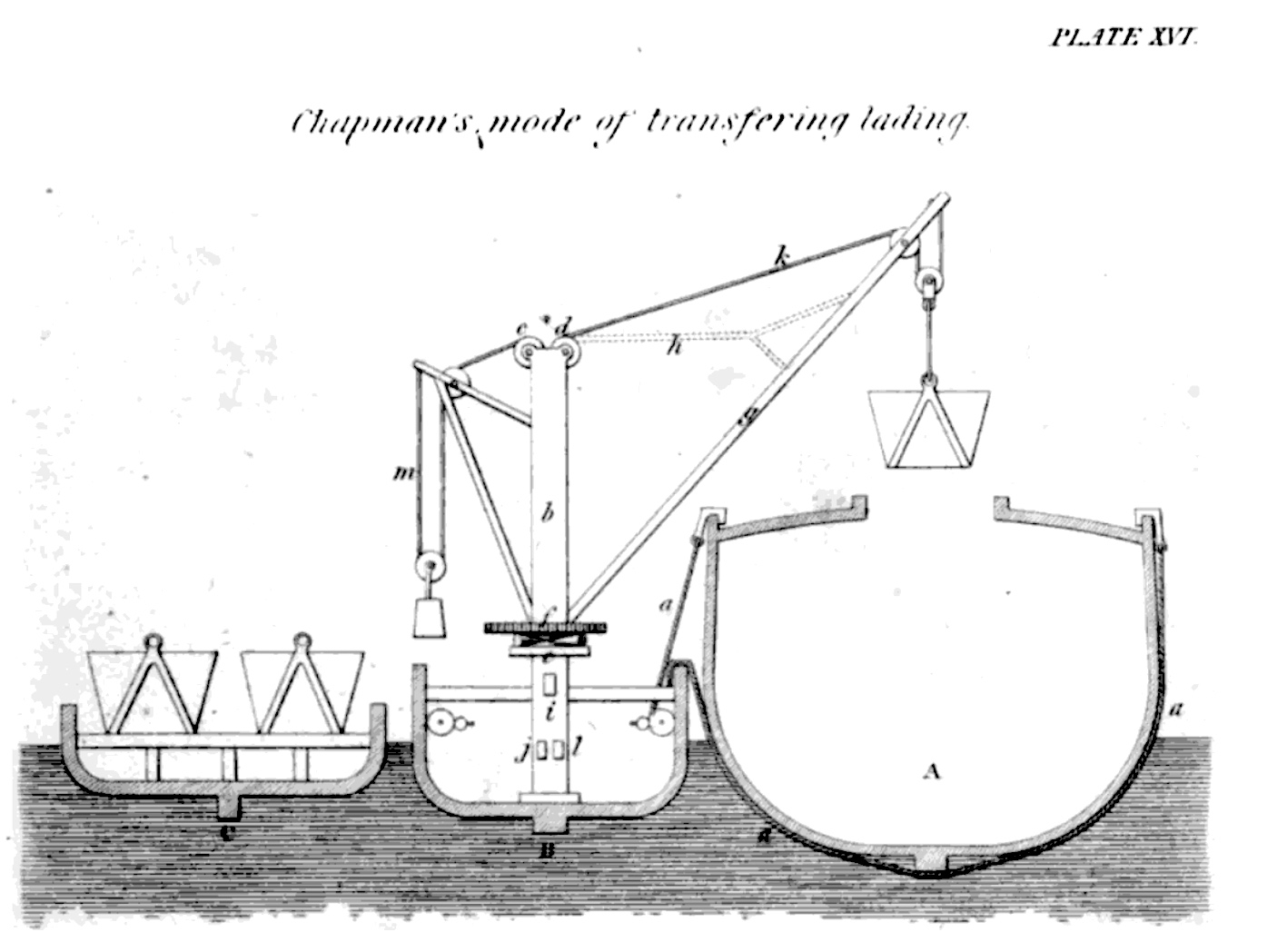
3. Tubbing (containerisation)

1. From a 1790 woodcut, British Museum. Coal was loaded directly into the collier through a rectangular tube called a spout. To reduce breakage the spout was inclined; later models could be adjusted to allow for the tide. There was a trick for minimising breakage. The spout method was of no use for loading colliers if the water was too shallow to admit them. Hence mines above bridge continued to use keelboats; the differential cost was to put a strain on the cartel.
2. A machine lowered a coal waggon gently onto the collier's deck, restrained by a counterweight. A moveable flap released the coal, whereupon the waggon ascended again lifted by the counterweight. Once again this technique required deep enough water. The peculiar shaped housing is the coal store. Underneath there is a spout for loading keelboats. This was the shipping staith of the famous Wallsend Colliery. (From Hair, Views.)
3. The coal was transferred in square tubs, which were waggons without wheels and held a standard, Customs-certified weight. Eight tubs exactly fitted into a keelboat. On arrival at the collier, which might be anchored in deep water, a crane lifted a tub from the keelboat (left) it and lowered it through the collier's hatchway (right) and into her hold. A moveable flap released the coal. This technique was preferred on the shallow river Wear, where keelboats were crewed by one man and a boy. (From William Chapman's patent drawing, 1822.) Introduced in 1817, it was calculated that this technique saved 45% in labour and breakage costs. It has been described as an early form of containerisation.

=== Know-how ===
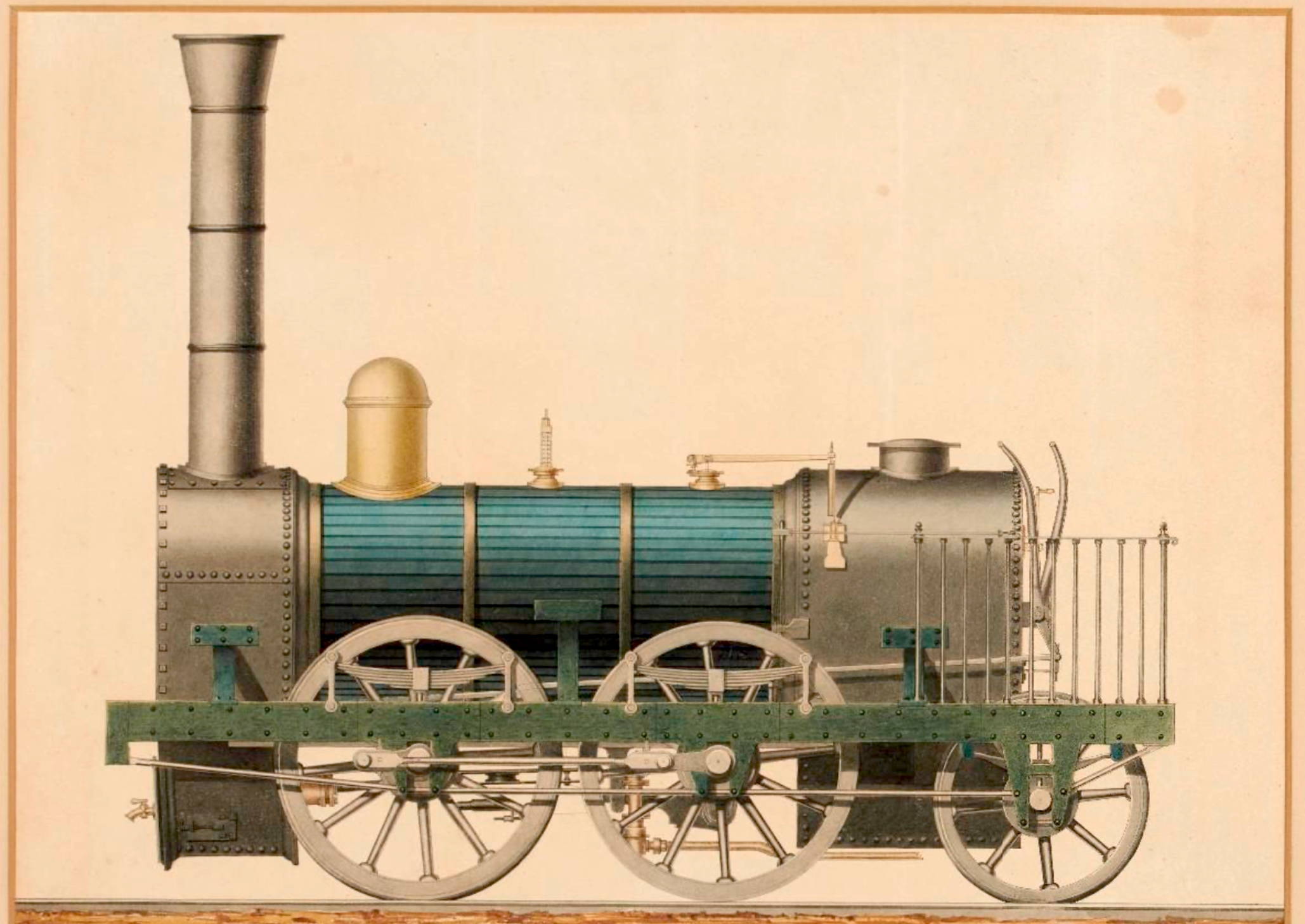
Locomotive 'John Buddle' — not the only one to be named after the famous colliery viewer (John Parsey, 1846, Science Museum Group)

==== Viewers ====
Colliery viewers were responsible for applying the technologies of the day in the most efficient and effectual manner. They combined the skills of managers, engineers, surveyors, accountants and agents. A consultant viewer offered his services part-time and advised several collieries, often about specific problems. North east viewers had a reputation for technical excellence and were in demand in other coalfields as far away as Nova Scotia and Russia. The best known is John Buddle (above).

==== Discounted cash flow accounting ====
It has been reported that viewers in the north east were applying discounted cash flow (DCF) analysis as early as 1801 in connection with the valuation of collieries. The technique, still unfamiliar to some accountants as recently as the 1960s, was called forth by a combination of circumstances, including the need for heavy investment in deep mining, the risky nature of the industry, the sharing of risk between multiple investors, and the delayed accrual of the benefit.

== The cartel: justification, criticism and polemics ==
=== Rationale ===
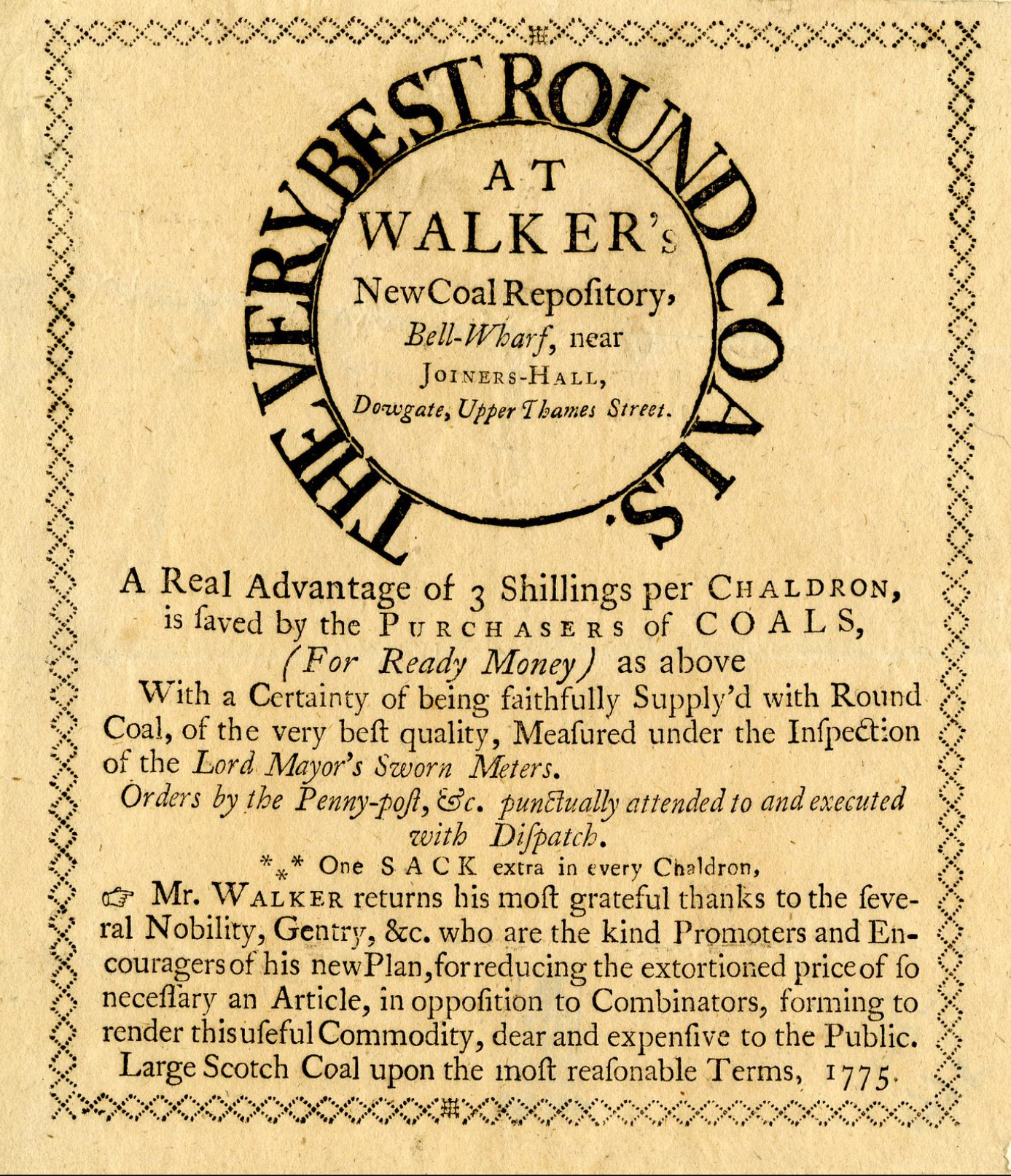
Beating the monopolists. A price-cutting London coal merchant's trade card (British Museum).

For many Londoners the Limitation of the Vend was "an infamous combination for extorting exorbitant prices".

The mine owners did not see it that way. They conducted the Limitation openly and without concealment (they printed their rules, for example, and mines had to swear their monthly reports before magistrates), were never successfully prosecuted by the law, and seem to have thought they were only defending themselves against an evil peculiar to their industry, namely irrational price slumps as will now be described. They told Parliament they were combining to keep up the price of their product like workmen combined to keep up the price of their labour, and were as justified.

Paradoxically, in a heavily invested mining industry under free competition, a slackening in the demand for coal can cause production to rise instead of falling. American economist Francis Walker, describing the origins of the coal mining cartels of Imperial Germany (where cartels, far from being illegal, were upheld by the law), explained it thus:

The prosperous years attract new investments of capital when profits are tempting, owing to decreasing costs and advancing prices, and when the lean years come, and prices fall, the hard times instead leading to a reduction of a output (which would increase costs) lead to an increase of production which, of course, only aggravates the fall in prices and the general difficulty.

The reason is that under a system of free competition no one mine can afford to limit its output — it would simply be playing into the hands of its rivals. Production must go on in order to pay some (even if an inadequate) return on the capital which is invested and which can not be withdrawn. Hence each mine tries to produce the greatest possible amount, hoping to gain something by increased cheapness of production,

knowing it will depress the price further, but accepting it as the lesser evil.

The resulting glut may instigate cutthroat competition ruinous to all.

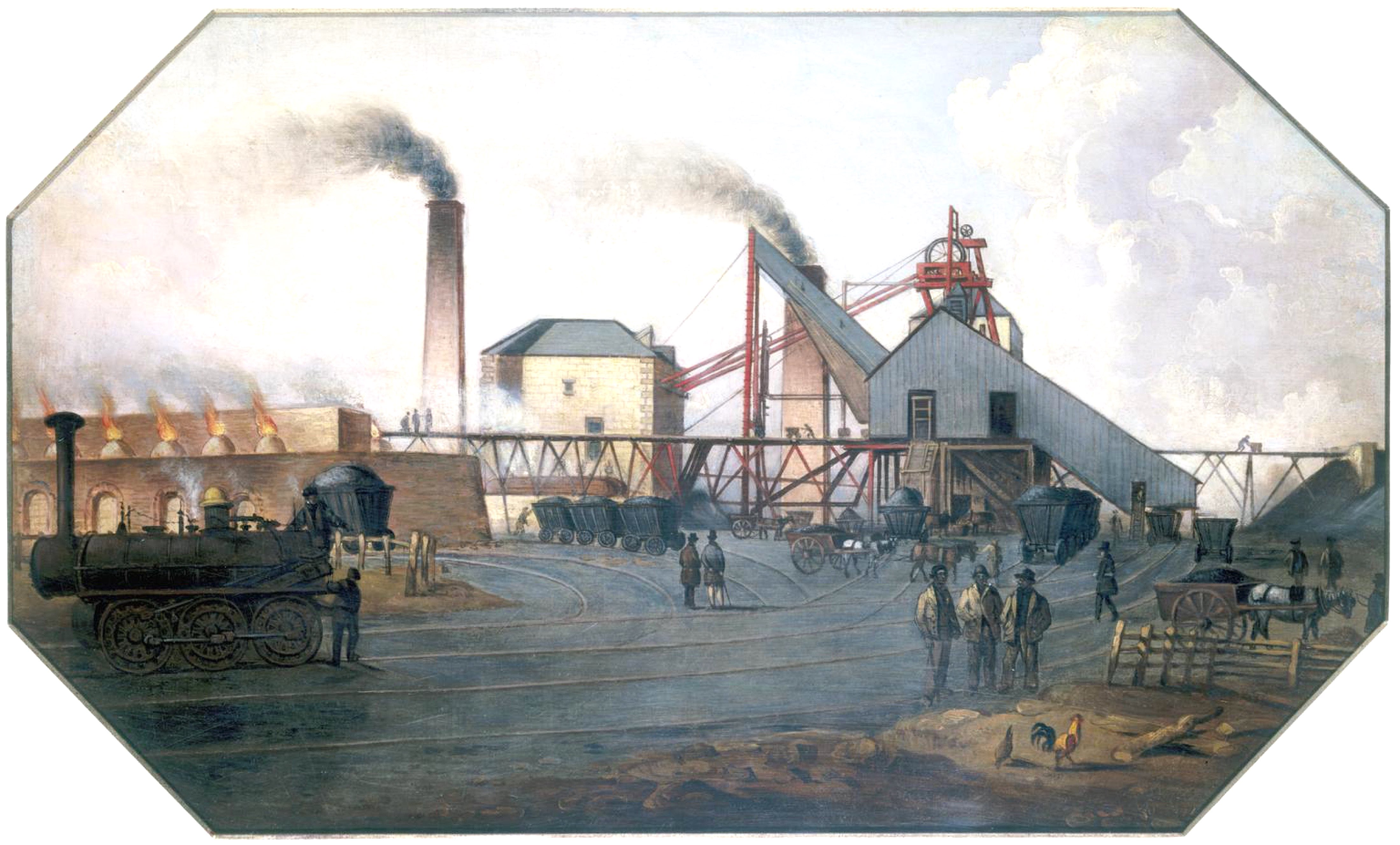
North-Eastern coalfield: colliery pit-head and coking ovens, 1845 (H. Wheldon, Science Museum Group)

The northeast coal mine owners themselves, asked why they did not compete, answered that coal-owners (unlike other industrial producers) could not be relied upon to stop producing when prices fell below the remunerative point.

Generally speaking, mines after they are once won must either continue to be wrought and kept a current-going colliery, or they must be forever abandoned. It is a work of the greatest difficulty, in many cases amounting to impossibility, to recover mines which have been abandoned.

If there had been shallow seams of coal, they could have been accessed or left alone according to the demand. The problem was the deep measures. A decision had to be made whether to incur the cost of sinking deep shafts and installing pumping equipment, steam engines, etc. Once incurred, however, it was a sunk investment. An American economist explained:

Having the capacity, each producer naturally wishes to make use of it every month in the year; and it requires a high degree of self-denial or a very close agreement to insure forbearance.

=== Alternatives ===
==== Closing marginal mines ====
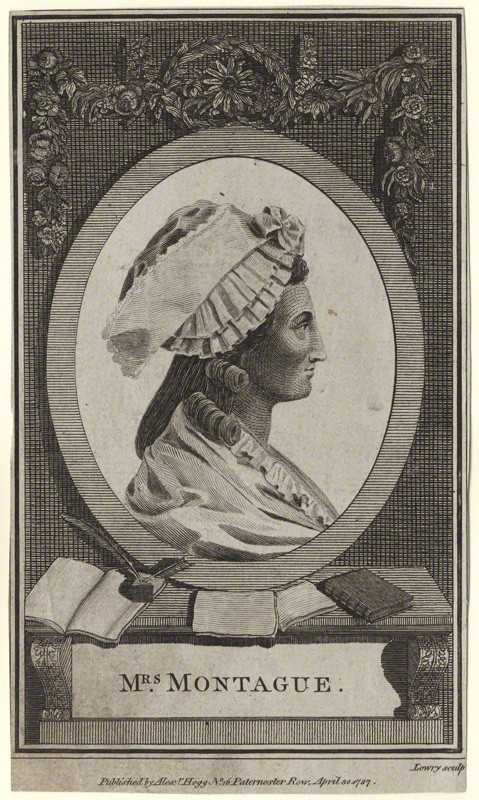
Elizabeth Montagu, intellectual, shrewd businesswoman and cartel member (Wilson Lowry, National Portrait Gallery)

An alternative to "close agreement" might have been to allow free competition and let the weaker members go out business. The 18th century intellectual Elizabeth Montagu, a shrewd businesswoman who owned a mine in the north east and was herself a member of the Limitation of the Vend, described a situation in which the cartel was threatening to break down:

The coal trade is at present in great confusion, some of the rich want to ruin the poor ones and so pull the price of coal so low that many will lose and where they have not a capital must give up after a while.

She disapproved of such "cunning devices" even though she was one of the rich members who would have survived. (Women were not unusual in the cartel: “in the early 1760s nearly half of the coal leaving the Tyne came from concerns whose titular heads were women”. According to Alexander Carlyle, Montagu was not to be outdone by the sharpest coal-dealer on Tyne.) Confronted by slackening demand, members like Elizabeth Montagu preferred to share the downturn according to the cartel rules. The "cunning" members wanted to drive the weakest pits out of business. Possibly, however, those that survived might have ended up with even greater market power, or so the Limitation's representatives told Parliament in 1830:

If, from the above-mentioned Causes, the inferior Collieries were ruined, and expelled from the Trade, the Supply would then be entirely in the Command of a few large Capitalists, who would be able to enhance the Price, and controul the Market, to an infinitely greater Extent than can now be accomplished

in which case "the natural effect would have been, that those Collieries that survived the shock would have raised the price to have remunerated themselves for the loss they sustained."

This argument did not impress some commentators who said that it did not happen in practice, and that "collieries are not simply abandoned when they show losses, but rather their capital value is written off".

==== Legalising cartels ====
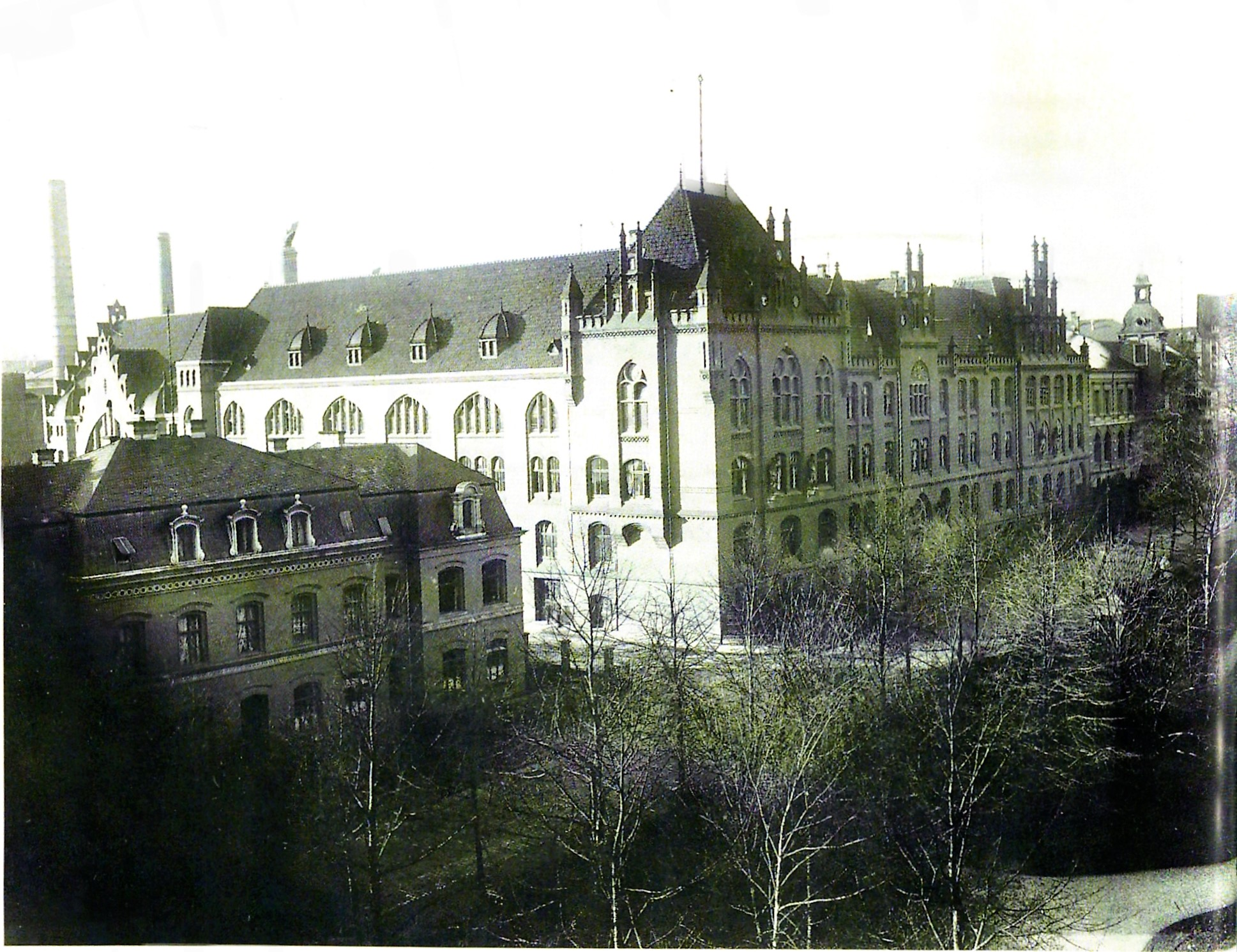
Rhenish-Westphalian Coal Syndicate, 1910, a cartel which controlled the coal mines of Germany's Ruhr. Until 1945 German cartels were upheld by the law.

A hundred years later, when Parliament regulated the privately owned British coal industry of the 1930s — with its surplus capacity and threatening unemployment — it introduced a cartel scheme with minimum prices and quotas. It has been argued that it kept the less efficient collieries open. Had the mines been in social ownership e.g. had they been nationalised under a National Coal Board, as they eventually were, conceivably it might still have made sense to limit production across the board while the downturn lasted, instead of closing the least efficient pits.

Today, cartels have "a very bad reputation" and, since 1945 under U.S. influence, have been banned in principle in many countries. They were even represented as a Nazi instrument for world domination. Attitudes were not always so. "Before 1945 most decision-makers in the West believed that cartels were generally beneficial". Before World War II cartels were the norm in the European coal mining industry. In imperial Germany, coal extraction in the Ruhr was almost completely cartelised; one study claimed it did not affect productive efficiency.

The Treaty of the European Coal and Steel Community (1951), a forerunner of the European Union, though it forbade cartels by Article 65.1, in effect tolerated them by Article 65.2 if they were deemed to improve efficiency — which in practice meant that "the High Authority gradually accepted cartels as temporary devices, authorized in times of penury".

Even in the U.S., where competition law hardly ever tolerates price fixing arrangements, the American Supreme Court in one case allowed a scheme in which 107 Appalachian coal mines sold all their output to a joint agency (which set the prices). The scheme, which took place during the Great Depression, and was preceded by a history of exceptional coalfield violence, was said to be justified by better efficiency.

==== Mergers ====
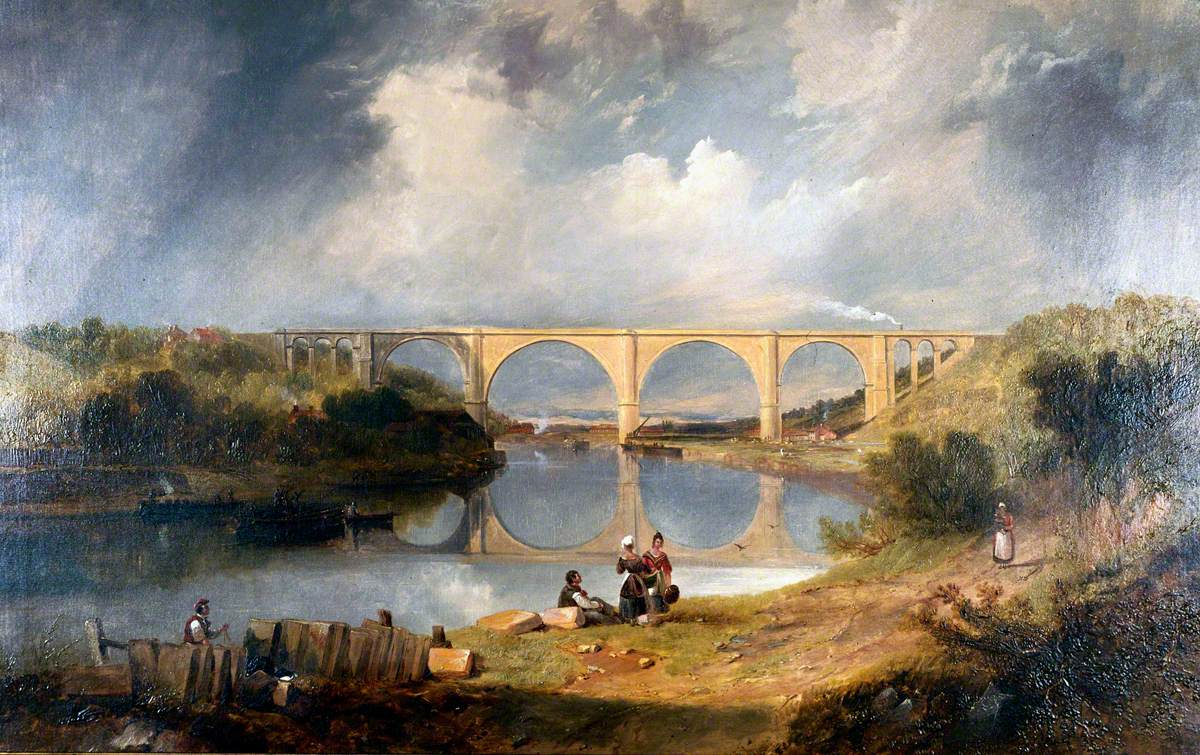
Victoria Bridge over the River Wear (John Wilson Carmichael, National Railway Museum)

In 1847 the London Northumberland and Durham Coal Company proposed to buy up the north east collieries: existing owners would become shareholders in the new company in proportion to the value of their properties. Thus, instead of a cartel between multiple owners, there would have been a single owner or monopoly. The proposal was strongly opposed by Lord Londonderry and fell through. (In economic terms, the scheme would have reversed an accident of history: the coalfield going into multiple ownership when Church lands were privatised during the English Reformation.)

Modern competition law has had to develop rules about mergers since they can achieve the same anti-competitive effects as a cartel. In the event, something like that did happen, because — by marriage, inheritance or otherwise — two of the mine-owning families (the Londonderries and the Durhams, see below) acquired so much property that they could afford to defy the cartel.

=== Free trade criticisms ===
==== Misallocation of resources ====
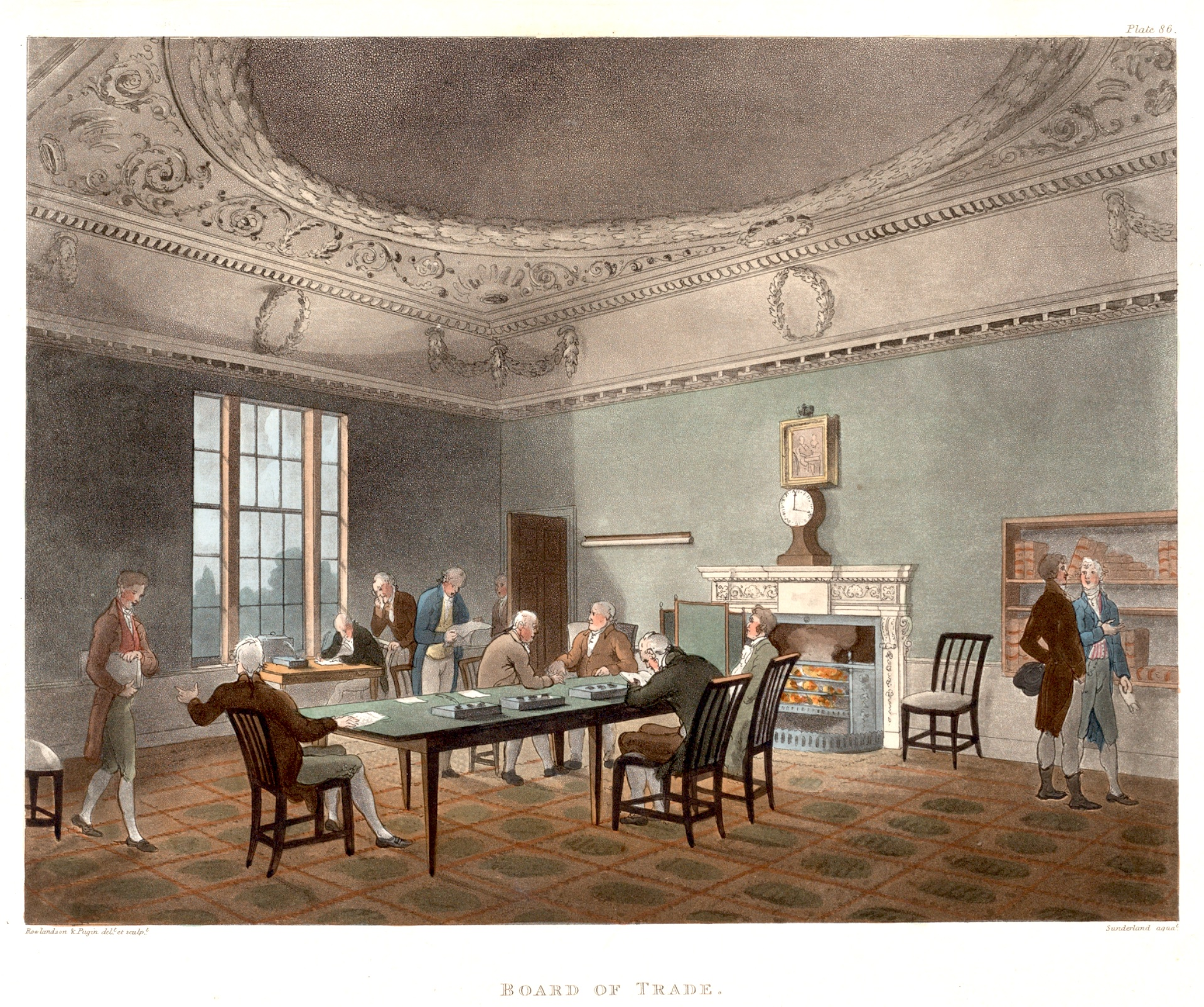
The Board of Trade, London, warmed by a fire of north east coals (Augustus Pugin and Thomas Rowlandson, 1809, Metropolitan Museum of Art)

A trenchant critic of the cartel was George Richardson Porter, free trader, chief statistician at the Board of Trade, and brother-in-law of economist David Ricardo. For Porter (The Progress of the Nation, 1843), the Limitation amounted to a virtual tax on the coal-consuming public, one that no government would have dared to impose, and more harmful than a real tax, for two reasons.

First, the cartel misallocated resources. Artificially large collieries were created which were then underused. Investors sank more pits, erected more steam engines, built more miners' cottages, and committed to pay mineral royalties on much more land than was really required. They did it to qualify for larger quotas. Thus (he claimed), in order to get a colliery that was allowed to sell 25,000 waggon loads to the British market, they built one that could produce 100,000.

Secondly, in order to make some use of this spare capacity, they exported as much coal to foreign countries as possible at whatever price they could get, since the cartel did not apply to these. "By this means the finest kinds of coal which are used in London, at a cost to the consumer of about 30s. per ton, may be had in the distant market of St. Petersburg for 15s. to 16s., or little more than half the London price". Nut coal, perfectly good for steam engines, was practically given away, so that in effect the British manufacturer was subsidising his foreign competitors.

It has been suggested that maybe Porter exaggerated the extent to which idle capacity was deliberately created, but he was writing towards the cartel's final years, when an unusually large number of new mines were coming on stream (see below).

==== Forcing inferior coals upon the market ====
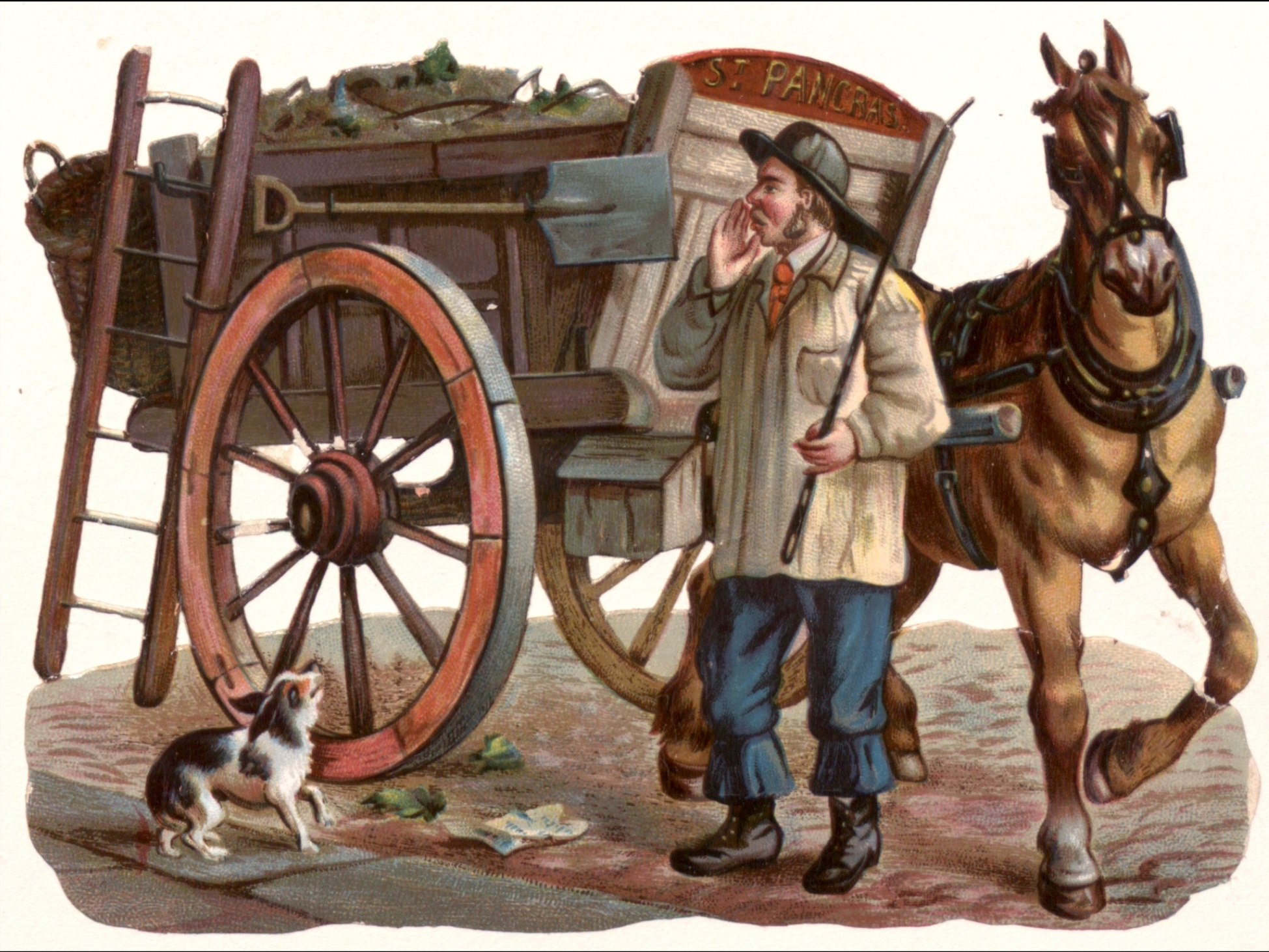
London street vendor (John Johnson Collection of Printed Ephemera, Bodleian Libraries)

In 1836 Thomas Wood, who had managed some of the new, productive mines, told the House of Commons that the best coals were being sold at artificially high prices in order that some inferior coals could be sold at all.

The Select Committee accepted this evidence:

The result, therefore, is, that at present the great majority of the Coal-owners on the Rivers Tyne, Wear and Tees, are combined, avowedly to limit the supply of Coals to the London Market, so as to raise the Price to the Consumer higher than a Free Trade would command: and, also, to force on the Market a larger proportion of inferior Coals, at Prices which could not be maintained otherwise than by such a Combination.

=== Cheap coal critiques ===
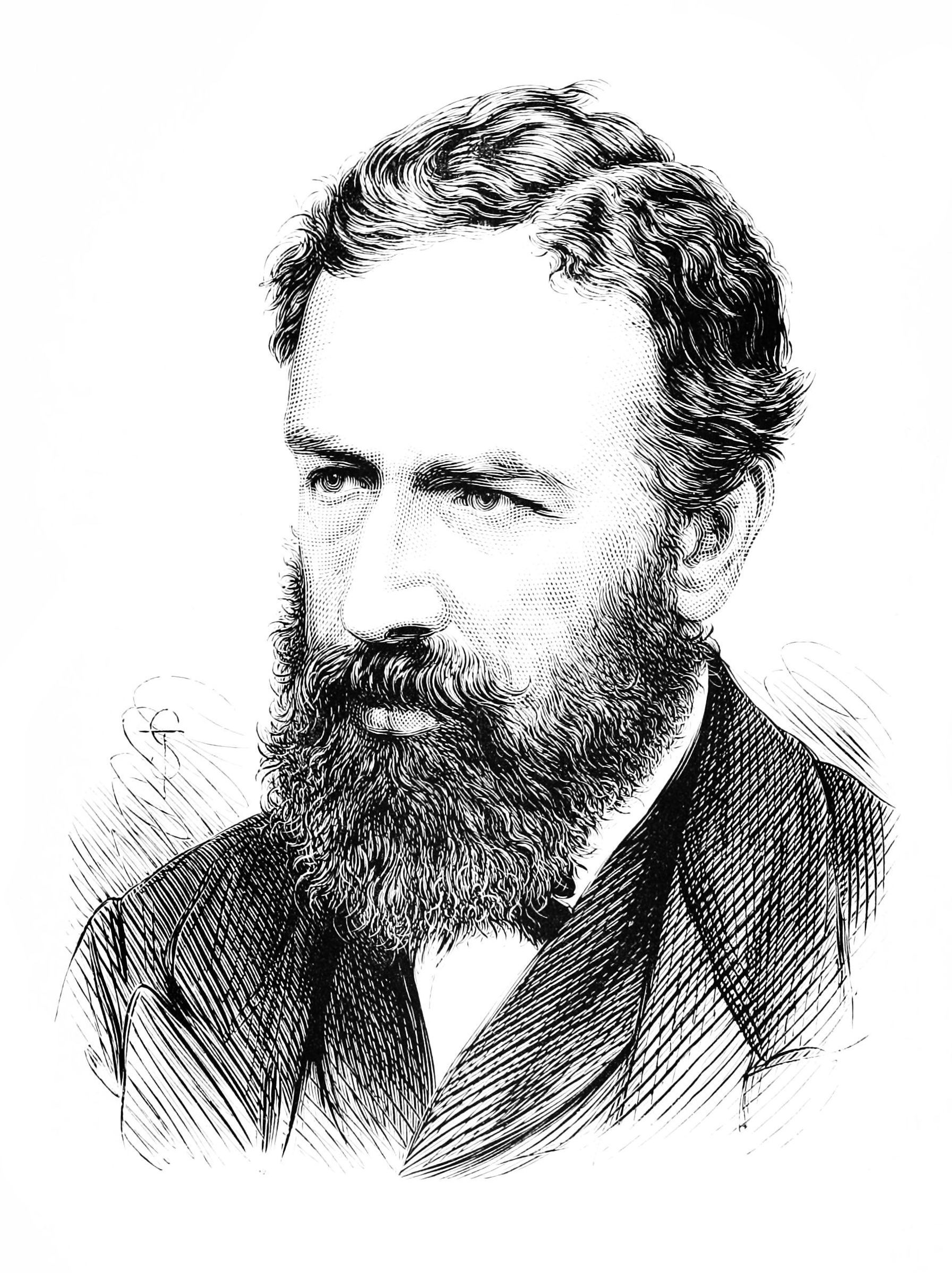
W.S. Jevons thought cheap coal was a mistake

==== Resource depletion: Jevons and his paradox ====
In The Coal Question (1865) the economist William Stanley Jevons argued that, although perhaps the Limitation of the Vend had increased the price of some grades of the product, the real problem was not expensive coal, but its prodigious use — in short, resource depletion.

His contention, now called Jevons' Paradox, was that cheaper coals (or, their more efficient use) meant greater demand for the fuel, and thus, quicker exhaustion of Britain's coal reserves. "To disperse so lavishly the cream of our mineral wealth is to be spendthrifts of our capital — to part with that which will never come back", he said.

Among other considerations, Jevons wrote of obligations owed to future generations and of "compensating posterity for our present lavish use of cheap coal".

==== Needless waste and pollution ====
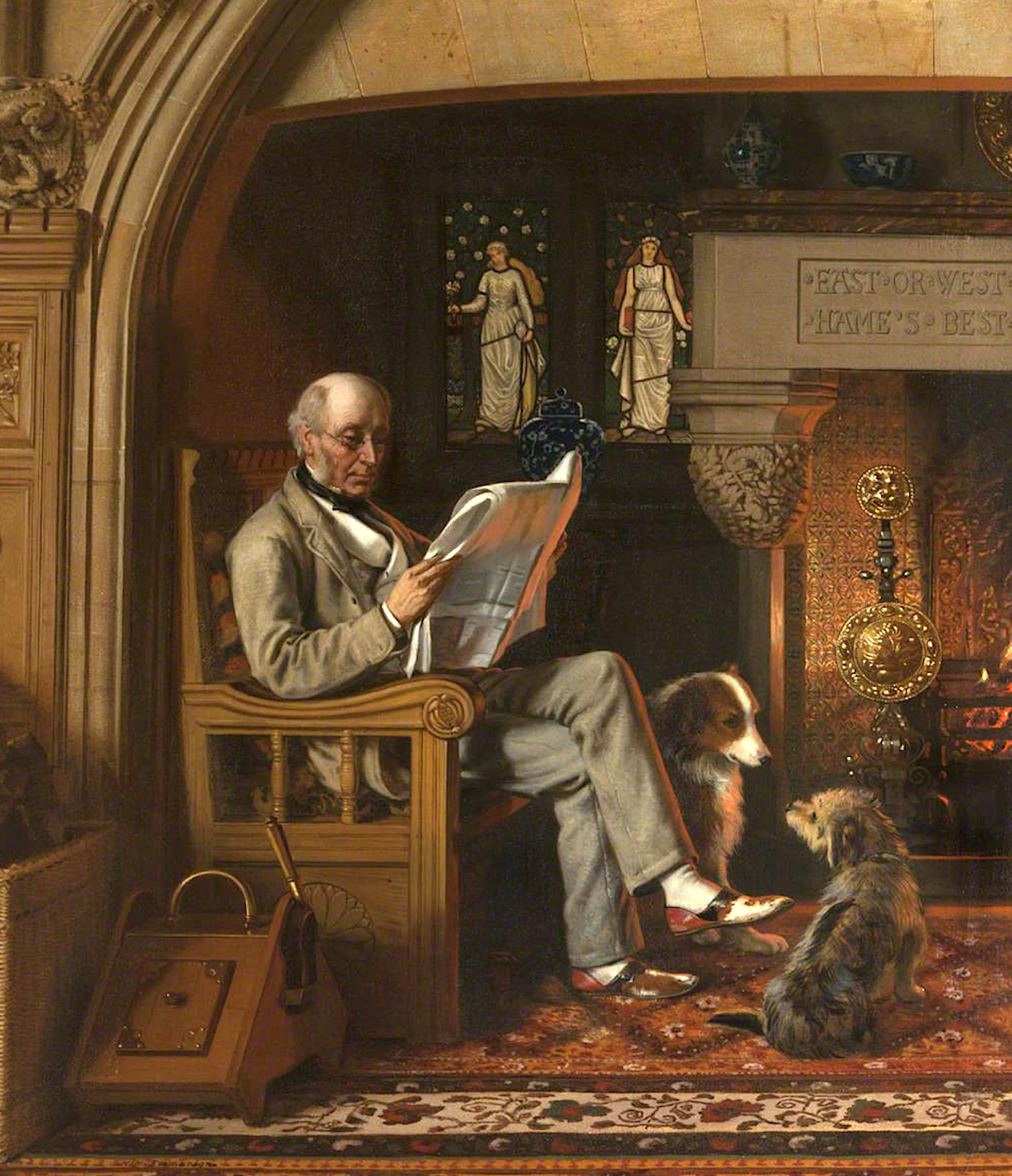
Sir William Armstrong excoriated open coal fires as irrationally wasteful but did not conceal that he enjoyed one himself (H. H. Emmerson, National Trust Cragside)

In his 1863 presidential address to the British Association for the Advancement of Science, Sir William Armstrong said:

In warming houses we consume in our open fires about five times as much coal as will produce the same heating effect when burnt in a close and properly constructed stove.

The money wasted, which effectively went up the chimney, exceeded the annual income tax.

In 1871 a parliamentary committee reported that large amounts of coal were being wasted through being burned in inefficient boilers. It was exacerbating the pollution of towns. Manufacturers had little incentive to address the problem, fundamentally because coal was so cheap. A recent study has found that the negative externalities included not only the negative impact on the quality of life but on employment and population growth.

=== Parliamentary appraisal ===
In 1800 a British parliamentary committee thought the Limitation of the Vend should be done away with. It "might at any time enable [the coal industry] to enhance the price of an article of such necessity, to the oppression and danger of the public". By the 1830s, however, Parliament thought the best solution was to encourage competition from other coalfields: see below, Parliamentary enquiries.

== The cartel: antecedents, origins and expansion ==
The Limitation of the Vend is often dated between 1771 and 1845, but the coal mine owners of the region had long been accustomed to act collectively to regulate output and prices.

=== The Hostmen of Newcastle ===
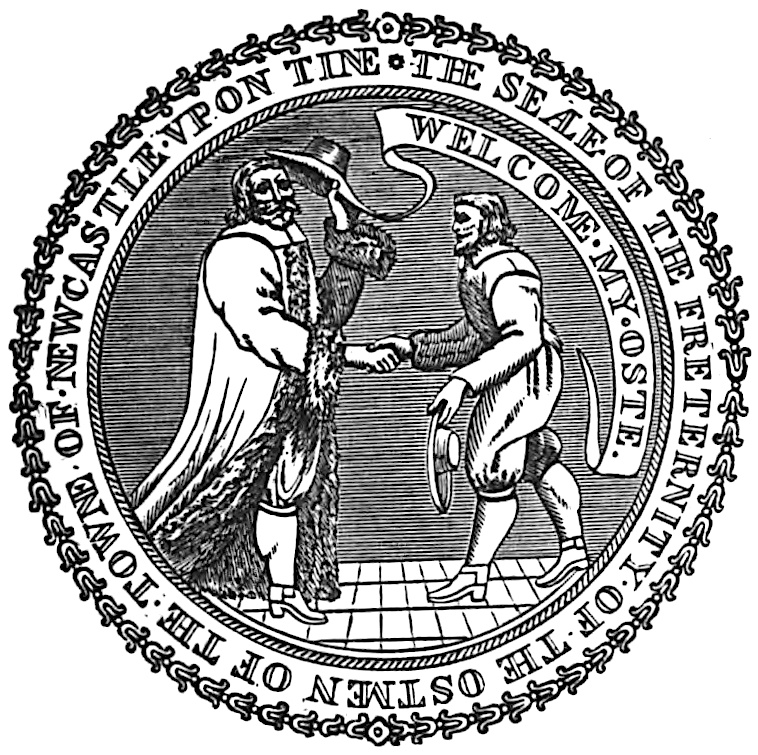
Seal of the Hostmen of Newcastle-upon-Tyne, originally a fraternity that entertained visiting merchants (F.W. Dendy, 1901)

The Hostmen of Newcastle upon Tyne was a fraternity that claimed the legal monopoly of exporting coals from the river Tyne to any town in England. The monopoly existed in 1600 and probably much earlier, and continued to be asserted until nearly 1740.

The Hostmen began in medieval Newcastle as a small group of householders whose function was to entertain visiting merchants, and see they behaved themselves. As a fringe benefit, the Hostmen acquired the customary right of selling them coal and grindstones, two Newcastle commodities no other trading company had yet appropriated.

In the Tudor era, however, circumstances combined to transform their modest privilege. The Church lands confiscated in the English Reformation included some coal-rich fields in the north east, which passed into private hands. The export trade to London burgeoned. The government of Elizabeth I — which, like many early modern governments, struggled to raise revenues — routinely sold monopolies. The government saw the advantage of imposing a tax on the Newcastle coal export trade, the problem being to collect it.

The government solved the problem by granting the Hostmen the exclusive right to supply coal to other towns; in exchange for this, the Hostmen were made responsible for seeing the tax was paid. The Hostmen were incorporated as a company or guild by royal charter in 1600.

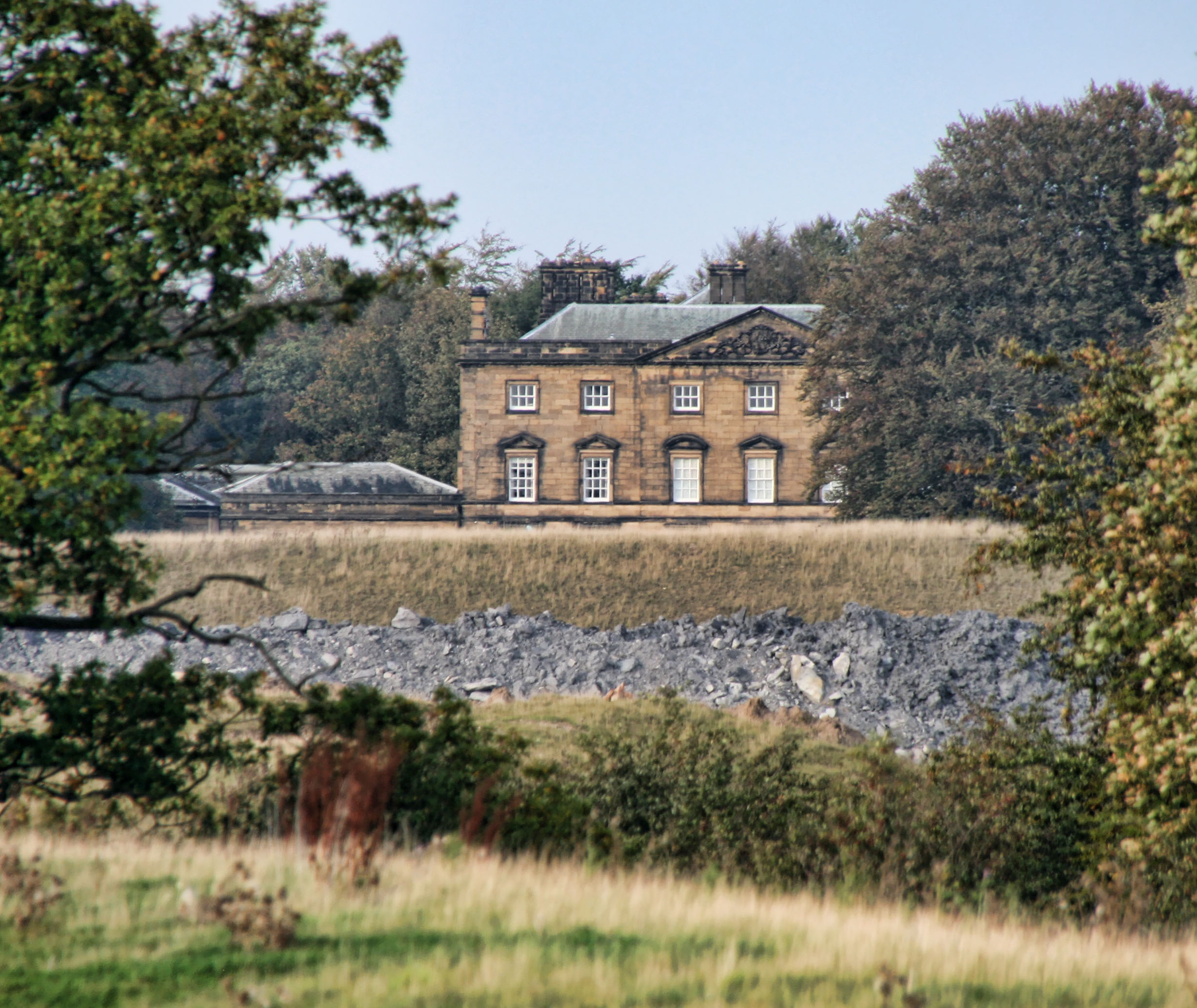
Blagdon Hall, Northumberland, seat of the White Ridley family since 1698

The Hostmen's monopoly was effective for a long time. In 1662 the town authorised them to seize coals (apparently, without a court order) vended by non-members and laid aboard ship, which they often did, even as late as 1720. It is known they used their monopoly powers to fix prices, despite complaints.

The legality of monopolies was strongly debated in England and as a concession Parliament passed the Statute of Monopolies 1623 which declared them void. However it contained exceptions and one concerned the Hostmen. The wording (reproduced in this note) was open to interpretation so that, although the Hostmen continued to exercise the monopoly well into the 18th century, they gradually gave up trying to, abandoning all pretence by 1740.

The Hostmen's Company still exists as a formal institution, and its records were published as a book in 1901. In the list of members, wrote the editor, were "the leading men in north of England mercantile life for the last three hundred years". It included

the Jenisons, afterwards Counts Jenison-Walworth in Germany; the Vanes and the Tempests; the Liddells, now represented by the Earl of Ravensworth; the Grays and Ellisons, now represented by Lord Northbourne; the Whites and Ridleys, now represented by Viscount Ridley; and the Scotts, now represented by the Earl of Eldon.

=== The Grand Alliance, and its downfall ===
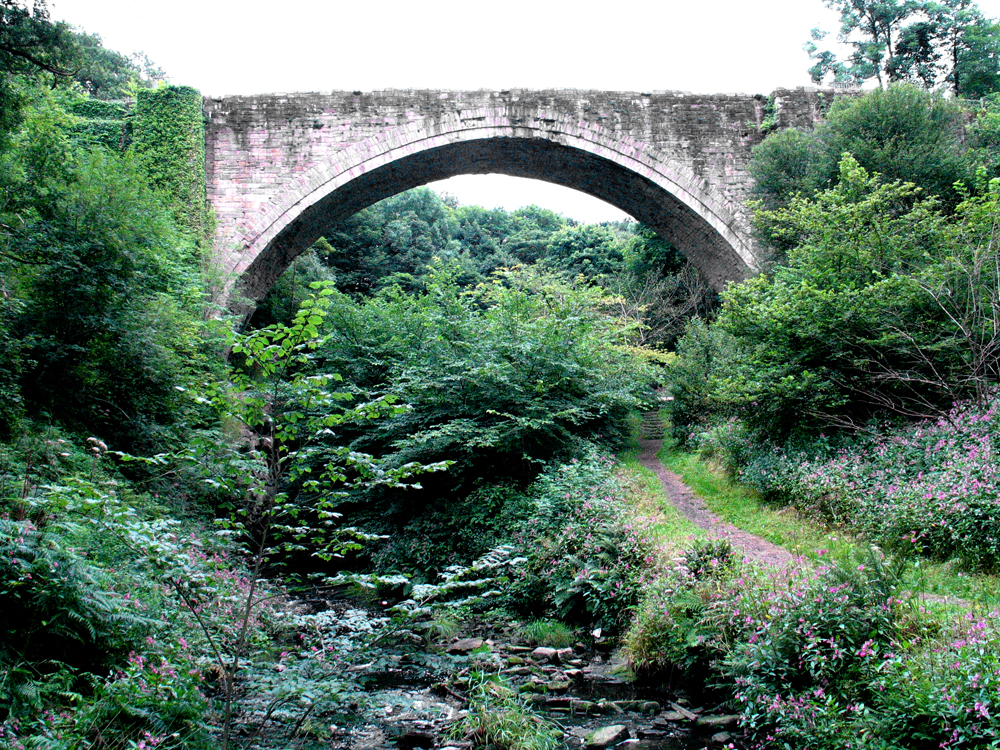
Causey Arch, the world's first single-span railway arch. Built 1726 by the Grand Allies, whose waggonway carried nearly half of the Tyne's coal traffic.

After them came the Grand Allies (1726), "the most powerful partnership that the coal trade has known" which apportioned quantities to be worked;

but more important, from the point of view of maintaining the monopoly, they joined to prevent the opening of new collieries by buying up of land, royalties and wayleaves. Any coal property which they could not directly get hold of they proposed to block off from an outlet to the river.

There is evidence that the powerful mine owners had a "contract" (really, a gentlemen's agreement) to limit production and fix minimum prices.

Their most visible achievement was the Tanfield waggonway, by which they cooperatively got access to the relatively distant river Tyne. Over it went about 400 waggons a day, or 5/12 of the coal traffic allowed by the cartel of the era. Causey Arch, the world's first single-span railway bridge, was built in 1726 to carry this railway. It was still carrying coal trucks in 1964, and is now declared a national monument.

However, the Allies' market power eventually collapsed because of rising competition from coal mines near the river Wear and new Tyneside mines below bridge. Also, technological advance and the development of a country banking system made it easier for new mines to enter the business. The Grand Allies continued to exist, however.

=== The Tyne and the Wear combine ===
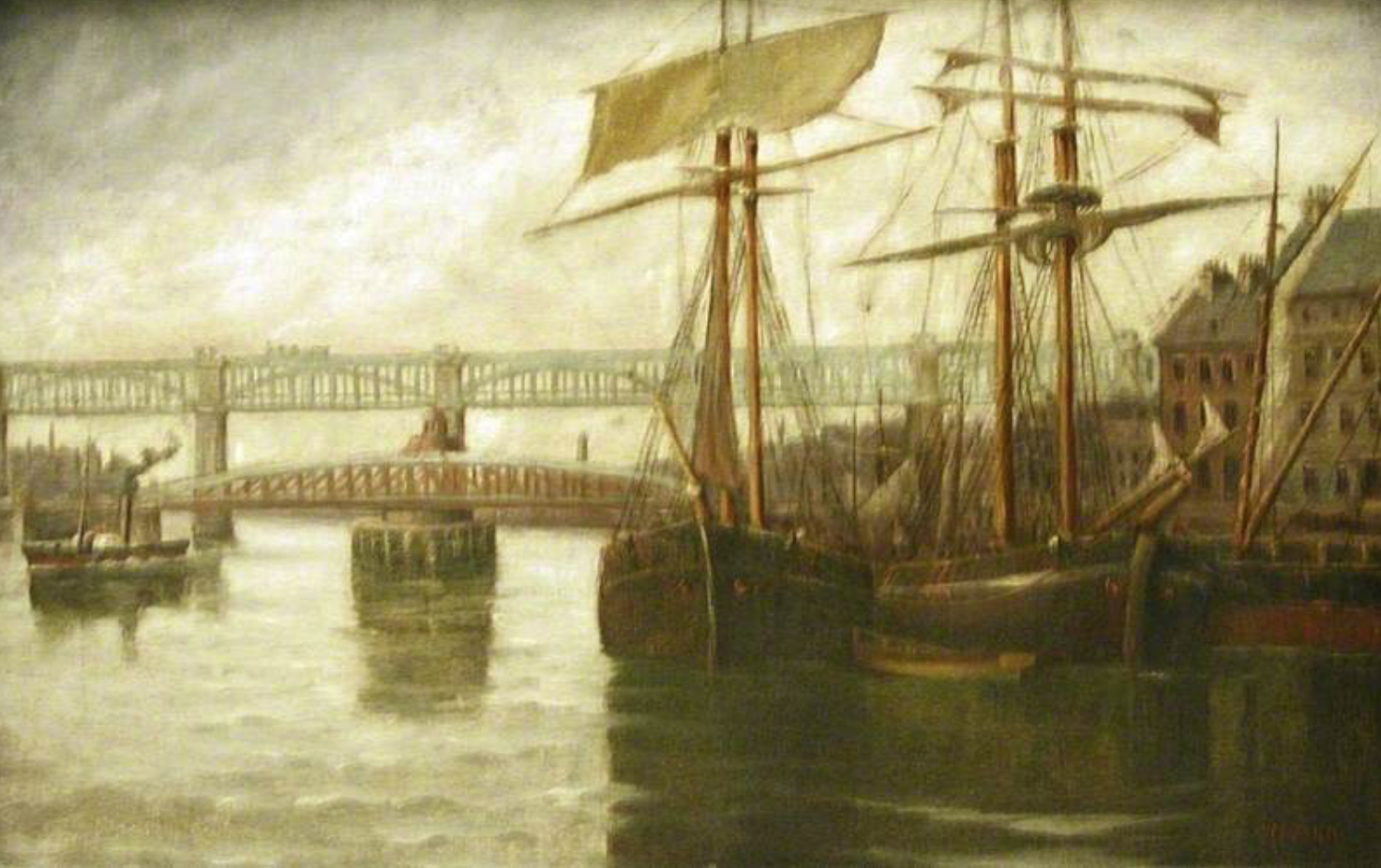
The Tyne, colliers below bridge (H. Carr, Newcastle, High Level and Swing Bridges, Shipley Art Gallery)

The Limitation of the Vend is often dated from 1771 when the mine owners of both the Tyne and the Wear combined. It differed from previous versions in that it did not even pretend to have legal powers to keep out competitors. "No longer was it possible to erect substantial [legal] barriers to the entry of new competition". The system depended on widespread consensus.

It seems there was no regulation at all between about 1750 to 1770, possibly because sales were expanding and prices were rising. But it appears to have led to over-investment, and excess capacity. The regulation was resumed around 1771.

Hermann Levy thought the new cartel originated in bitter competition between newly discovered mines and the old ones. Typically the old mines were located near the river Tyne, but above bridge, ten miles from the sea, where seagoing ships could not go. Their owners — the Ravensworth, Strathmore and Wortley families i.e. the Grand Allies — had secured all the best lands, or so they had thought. To their dismay they found they had burdened themselves with "long and costly leases", for better mines were found elsewhere.

Deep mining technology won new, rich seams of best coal; furthermore, in locations favourable for transport. They were below bridge on the Tyne, and so could load coal directly onto the ships; or they were on the river Wear, whose keelboats used an early form of containerisation.

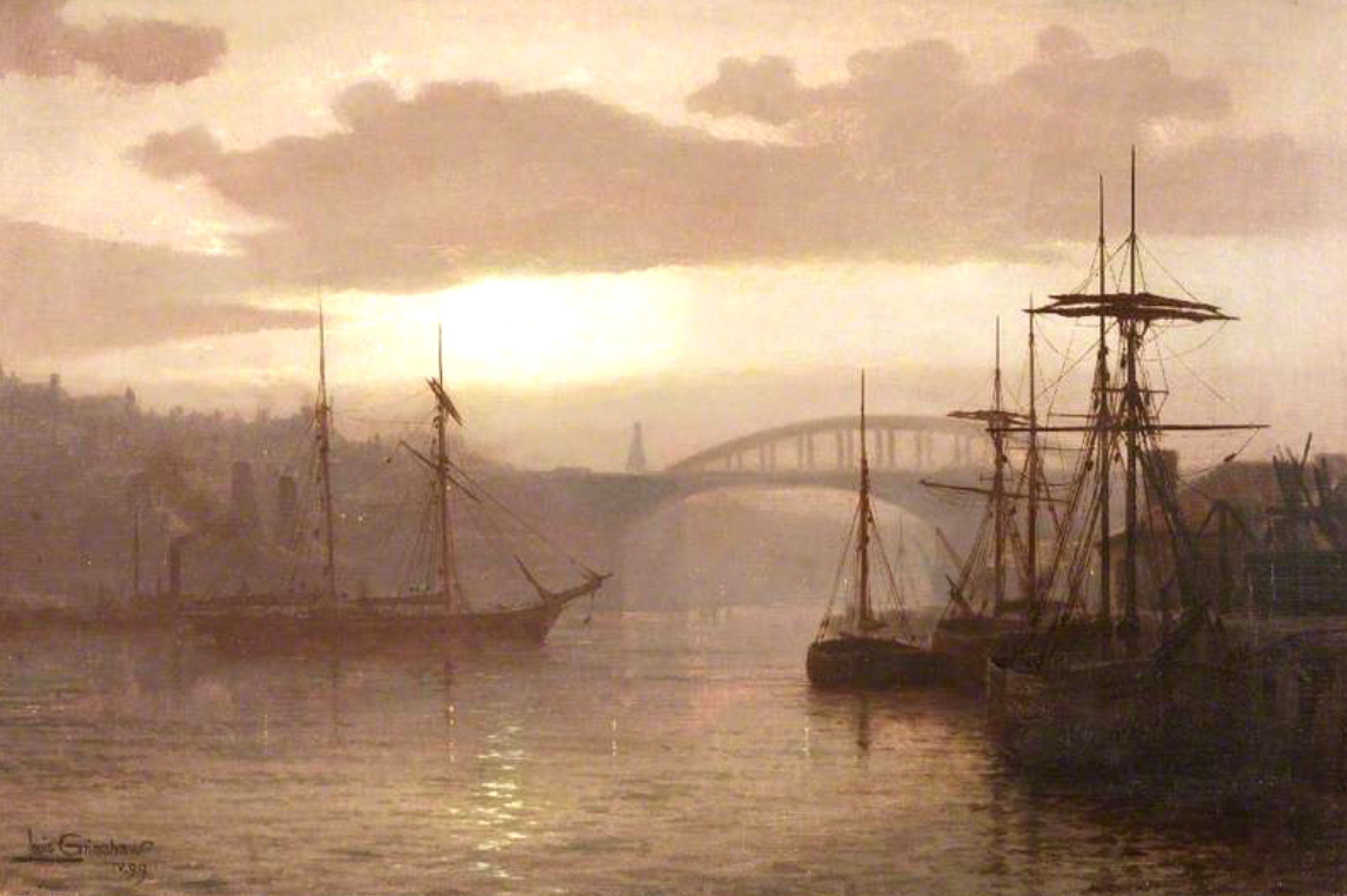
The Wear, colliers below bridge (Louis Hubbard Grimshaw, Sunderland Harbour: Sunderland Museum & Winter Gardens)

To compete with the new mines on quality, the old mines resorted to a "blameable" practice. They screened their coals through a grid, selling the large, valuable lumps and rejecting the small coals, which were waste.

The waste was so enormous that the labourers were directed from time to time to set fire to the heaps accumulated ... After lasting some years, both parties became weary; they found it prudentially wise to unite in interest, to equalise the price, to regulate the transmission from each colliery.

"Hence their union became a direct monopoly; it was agreed that the market should be fed, and not glutted".

(The burning of small coals as unsaleable waste continued, however; it can be seen in the c. 1840 illustration Fiery mine at night, above, Ventilation.)

The natural Wear was shallow, and inferior as a coal-shipping river, but its harbour commission was a progressive authority, willing to invest in improvements, unlike its Tyne counterpart, which was apathetic. By 1770 the Wear navigation had been much improved, it could take bigger ships, and the tonnage shipped coastwise had risen from 40% to 60% of the Tyne's.

Thus the Limitation of the Vend, to work, needed the cooperation of the owners of the mines adjacent both rivers, and this was obtained by assigning quotas: at first Tyneside got 60%, Wearside 40%. Later, the rivers wrangled over their shares: it was to prove a source of instability. In 1829 they agreed to submit any future unresolved disputes to binding arbitration.

=== Nineteenth century expansion ===
==== The river Tees and its ports join the cartel ====
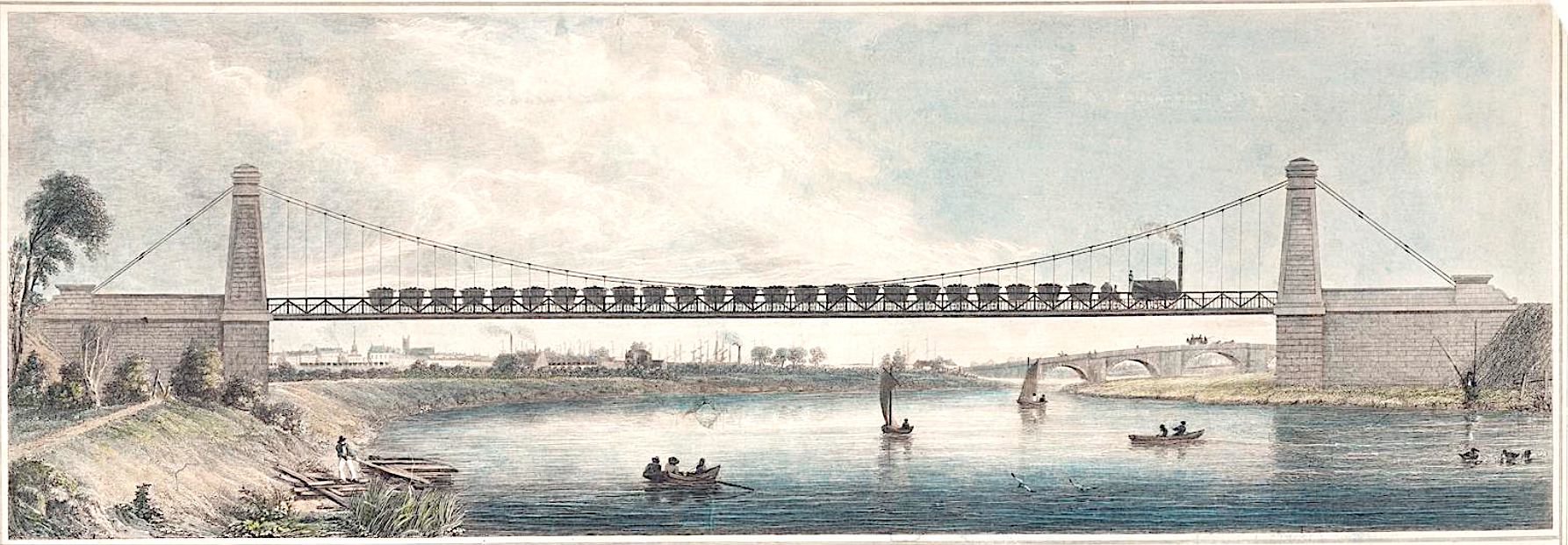
The breakthrough: Stockton and Darlington Railway extension over the Tees (1830) linked mines in south of coalfield to a deep water port (Middlesbrough, pop. 150). They soon joined the cartel. (J. Miller after W. Dixon: Science Museum.)

Unlike its northern sisters, the river Tees was not on the coalfield. The nearest mines were in the Auckland district of south Durham, and were rudimentary land-sale collieries, sending their produce to local consumers by road, even pack-mule. The cost of a ton of coal doubled between Bishop Auckland and Darlington, and trebled by Stockton-on-Tees, where it might be better to import it by sea.

The Stockton and Darlington Railway was promoted (1818) to carry this local coal traffic more efficiently for the benefit of local consumers while making a modest profit. Since Stockton was an unsatisfactory port — the navigation from river to sea was poor — the railway's Quaker promoters thought an export trade was a distant dream. The Limitation of the Vend did not even bother to oppose the railway effectively in Parliament. They were to regret it.

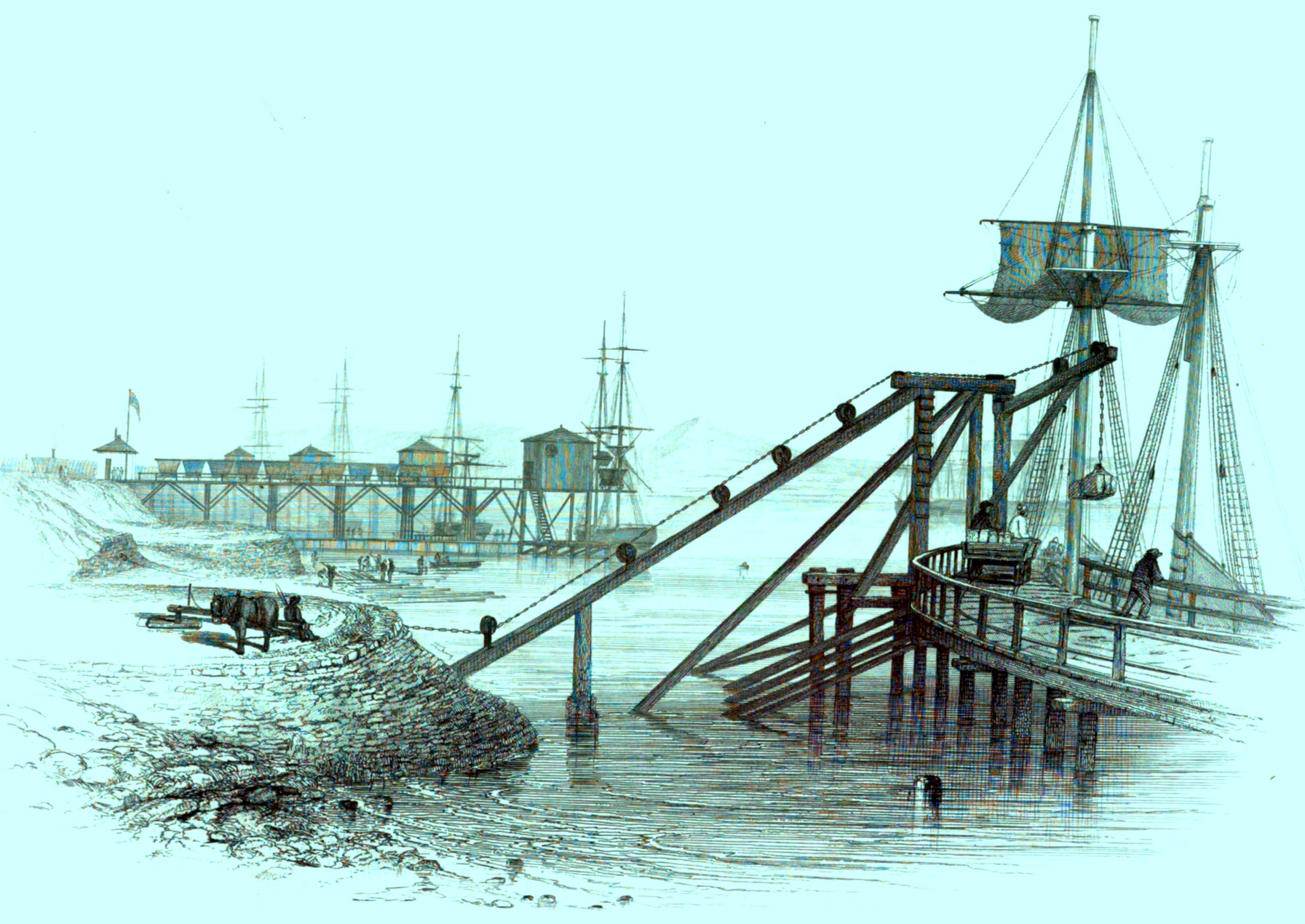
Port Clarence, the drop (T.H. Hair, Views). The Clarence Railway was the first in the world to compete for freight traffic.

Christopher Tennant, a Stockton merchant, had a different vision. He appreciated that, if a good deep water port could be made, it should be possible to supply it by rail, hence tap the lucrative London market. He promoted the rival Clarence Railway for the purpose. Powerful members of the Limitation of the Vend strongly opposed it in Parliament on environmental grounds, at first successfully, saying the locomotives would be a public nuisance (May 1825). The Stockton and Darlington bitterly resented the competition from the Clarence, regarding it as an interloper; despite this the Clarence was legally entitled to run its waggons on the S&D line.

Shortly afterwards, the Stockton and Darlington realised they could have a profitable coal export trade after all. It was so successful that the directors decided to build a suspension bridge across the Tees to Middlesbrough (pop. 150), where a better port could be made. The cartel tried to deny the railway the necessary sanction by Parliamentary and strongly opposed the scheme in the House of Lords.

The coal-owners of the Tyne and Wear, who had been caught napping in 1821, were now wide awake to the danger of the Tees competition, and they banded their forces together to prevent the continuation of the railway to deep water. Having themselves to pay heavy wayleave rents, they contended that the legislature, in sanctioning a public railroad for the conveyance of coals, was virtually giving a bonus to their rivals in trade by relieving them from the difficulty of bargaining with the landowners for a right of passage through their property and by rendering unnecessary the investment of capital in waggonways.

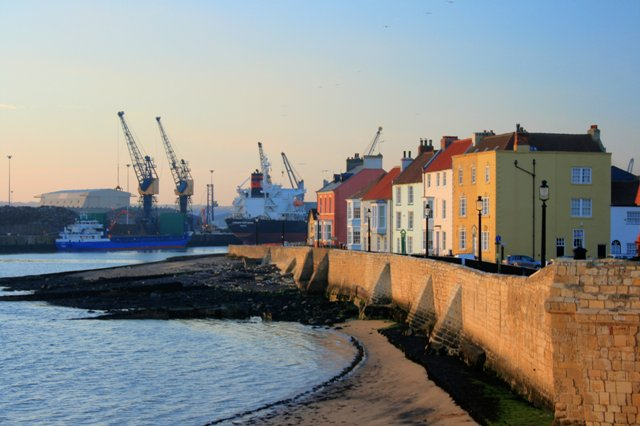
Hartlepool, showing medieval town wall with Victoria docks in background

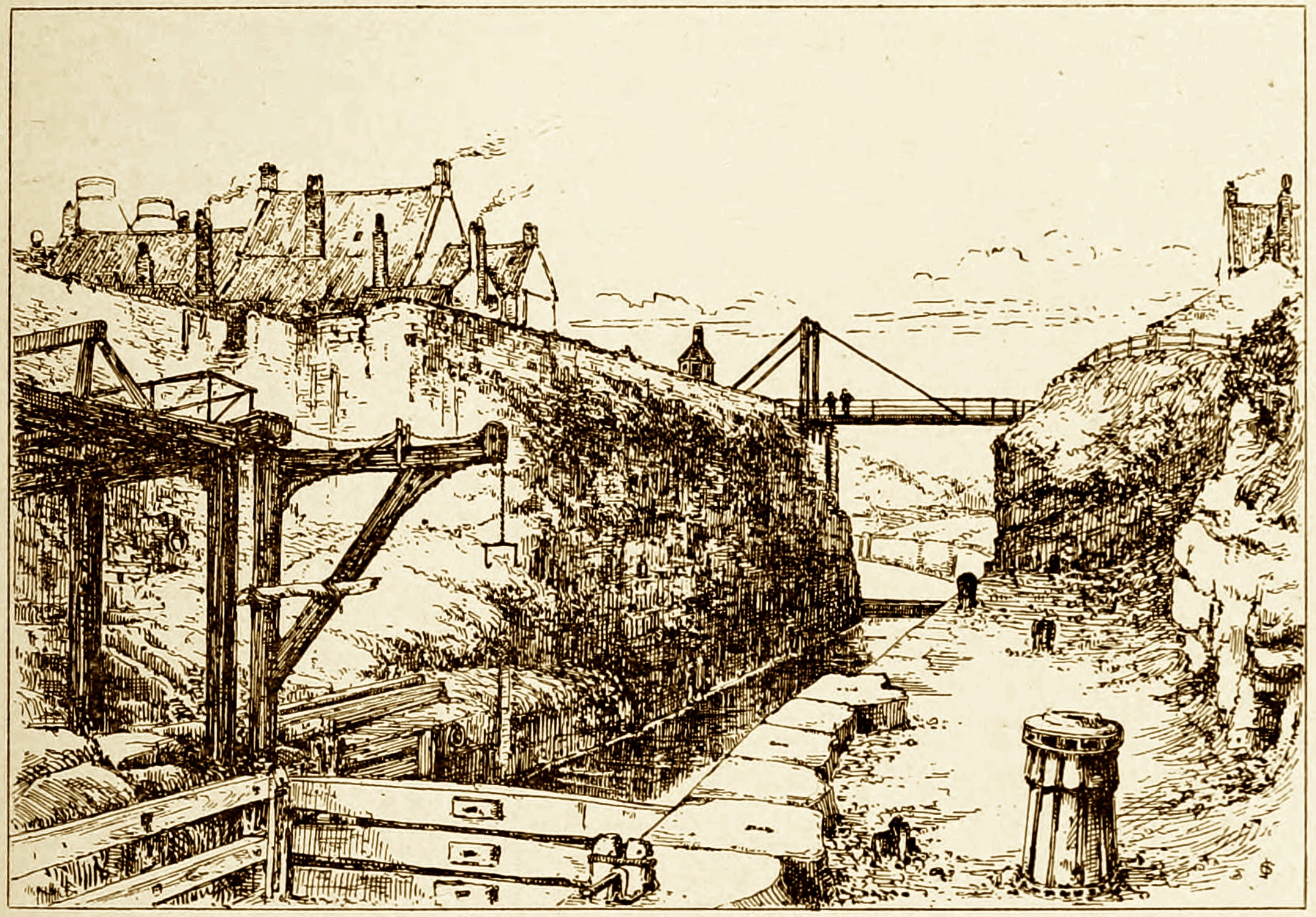
The Cut, Seaton Sluice, Northumberland, smallest of the coal ports to join the cartel

Nevertheless, the scheme passed. This was "the real break-through". New mines, attracted by the export trade, adopted modern technology, found a seam of excellent household coal, and the area boomed; population grew. The Tees competed with the Tyne and Wear. Later, a still better port was constructed at Hartlepool and served by the Clarence and a third railway.

In 1834, by which time the Tees' coastwise exports were overtaking the Wear's, the Limitation of the Vend persuaded the mines of south Durham to join the cartel.

Coastwise exports (tons/year, average)
	Tyne	Wear	Tees
1810-14	1,659,000	917,000	
1815-19	1,729,000	962,000	
1820-24	1,870,000	1,161,000	
1825-29	1,922,000	1,391,000	
1830-34	2,004,000	1,064,000	See note^{*}
1835-39	2,306,000	939,000	1,148,000
1840-44	2,264,000	874,000	1,436,000
1845-49	2,422,000	1,734,000	1,407,000

^{*}Complete statistics are not available, but in 1830-31 some 281,960 tons of coal were carried over the bridge to the staithes.

There were also large amounts produced for local consumption e.g. by the iron and steel industry or (after the export tax was reduced) for export to foreign countries.

==== Northumbrian coal ports join ====
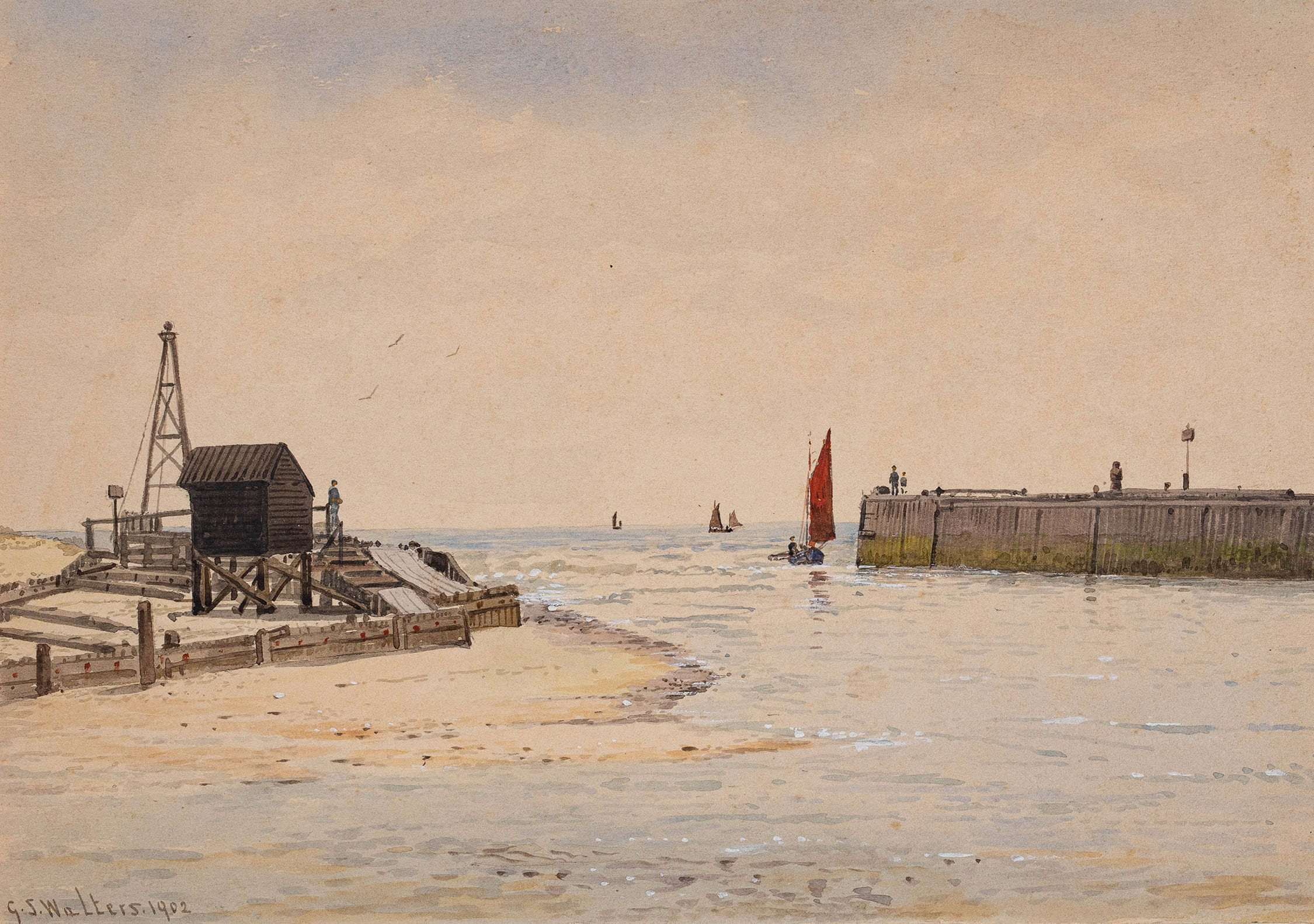
Entrance to the harbour, River Blyth (George Stanfield Walters: Abbott and Holder)

Mines in the River Blyth area had been the first to build waggonways for the sea-sale of coal — in 1605 — but shipments were always comparatively low. The river was not a good natural port. "At low Water the Sea, at the opening of the Creek, may be safely passed on horseback" wrote Daniel Defoe (1769). In 1814 it was still shallow, with a hard bed and dangerous rocks at the entrance. Improvements were considered, but rarely carried out; a proper harbour was not constructed until 1854. Even so, the Blyth shipped enough coal coastwise to be invited to join the cartel in 1834.

In contrast the modest Seaton Burn ("dry at Low-water Mark", according to Defoe), attracted investment from the Delaval family, Seaton Sluice being the first gated dock in the region. When the sluice was opened at low tide twice daily, water rushed out and "scoured the Bed of the Haven clean" (1676). In 1758 a new colliery was opened at the nearby village of Hartley and a 900-foot (300 m) long harbour entrance was cut through solid rock ("looked upon as one of the greatest engineering feats of the day"), providing a navigable depth of 11–14 feet, and enabling ships to leave the harbour fully laden. Coal could be laden directly aboard through spouts. So rapid was the turnaround that vessels could make 10 London sailings a year. In 1777 the little harbour exported 81,300 tons of coal, even though its produce was unsuitable for household use, being sold for industrial purposes. Despite this, its mines (like those of the Blyth and Tees) were invited to join the cartel in 1834.

==== Seaham Harbour ====
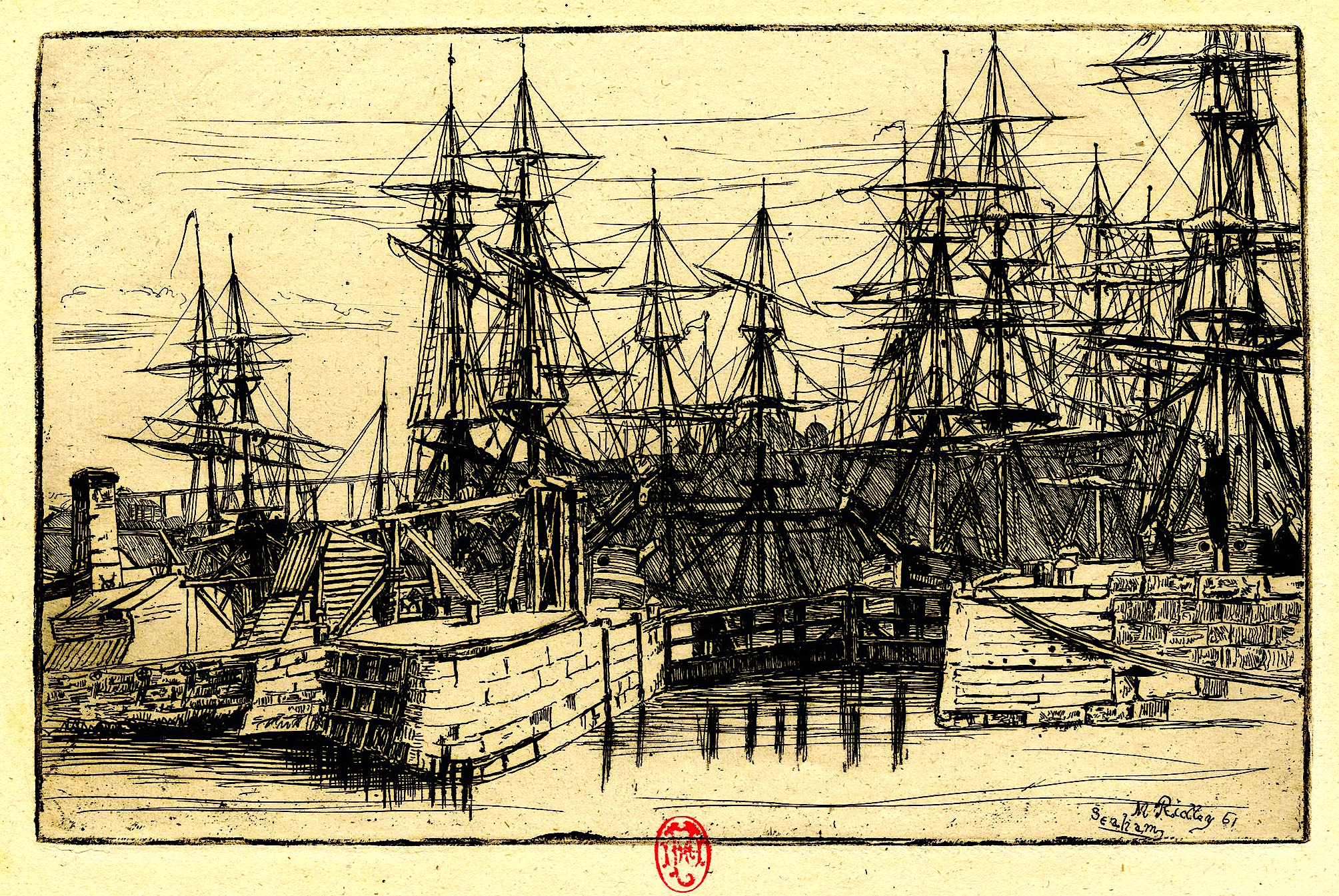
Seaham Harbour (Matthew White Ridley, etching on paper, British Museum)

In 1821 Lord Londonderry, who was being advised by John Buddle, bought 2,000 acres of cheap farmland at Seaham, then a small settlement on the rocky coast a few miles south of Sunderland. The two men were informed that here was an opportunity to create a private sea port, much better for shipping coals than the river Wear. It would operate in all weathers (the Wear and the Tyne could freeze up, or be shut in by easterly winds); it would be less congested; and it would avoid the Wear keelboats and their exorbitant charges.

A 5.8 mile railway, driven by stationary and locomotive steam engines, was built simultaneously. It conveyed coals from Rainton to Seaham. To build the port a conical pinnacle of rock weighing thousands of tons had to be blasted into the air. Londonderry persisted for years while running heavily into debt, but eventually the port began to ship coal in 1831, catering not only for the Londonderry mines but for other new pits sunk through the Magnesian Limestone at Monkwearmouth, Seaton and Murton.

Lord Londonderry was now so powerful a member of the cartel that, were he to oppose it, it would collapse; but that was much later. In 1838 a ship's captain told the House of Commons what happened to him at Seaham for flouting the Limitation's rules:

I had been a good customer at Seaham, and I went over to Seaham; and Mr Spence, the agent to the Marquis, held out his hand before I got to him; he said, "It is no use your coming here, Mr Young; we will not load you; you may compel them to load you in Newcastle by the turn, but we will not load you here".

==== The new Basis ====
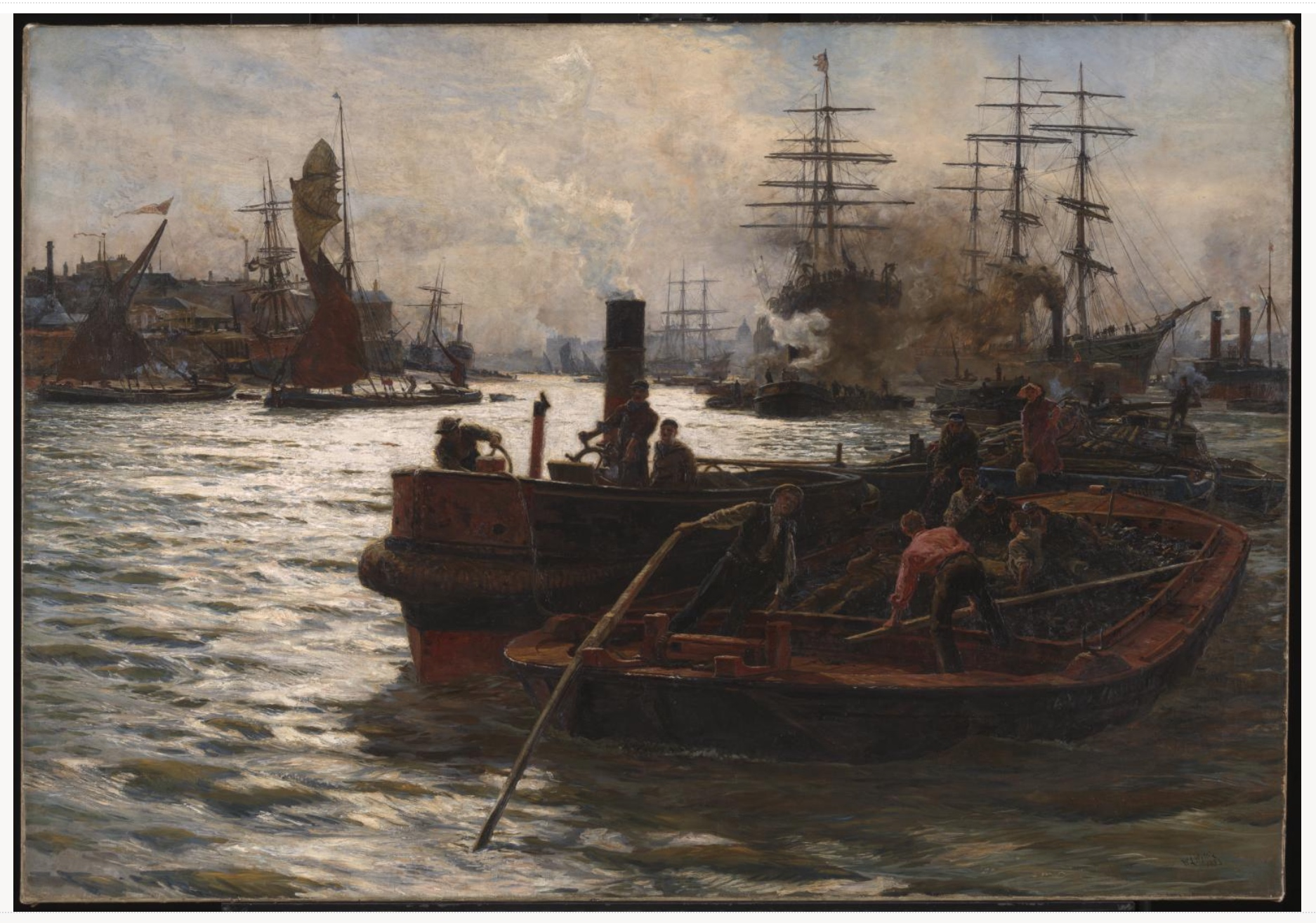
Toil, Glitter, Grime and Wealth on a Flowing Tide (W.L. Wyllie, oil on canvas, Tate) implying a London world where power is obtained by burning coal

In 1835 the cartel allocated the Basis as follows:

District	Basis in Newcastle chaldrons
Tyne	939,000
Wear	585,000
Tees	160,000
Hartley, Cowper, Netherton	68,750

=== The changes summarised ===
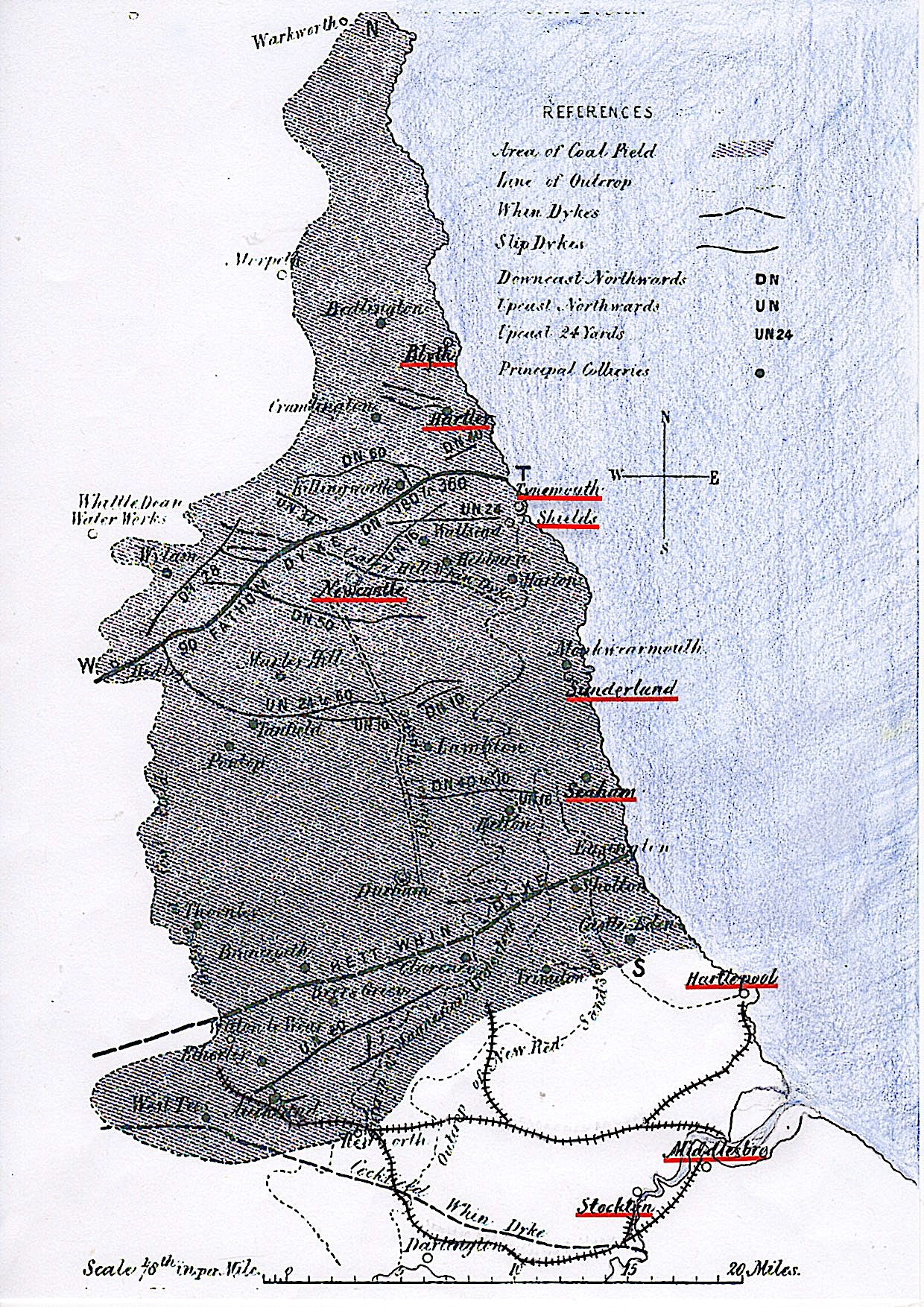
The coalfield and its shipping ports c. 1850 showing railways connecting to the Tees ports

The Limitation of the Vend, therefore, from 1771 to 1845 was obliged to adapt itself to those technical and spatial changes, and a background of events such as the American war, the wars with France ("the major features of which were the fear of invasion, the threat of privateers, the adoption of the convoy system, the depredations of the press-gangs and the restriction of markets for coal"), the coming of the railway age and the Reform Act 1832.

Coastwise shipments (tons)
	1799	1856
Newcastle	1,186,720	1,978,682
Sutherland	791,213	1,337,538
Blyth^{*}		96,479
Hartlepool		1,074,189
Seaham		652,625
Middlesbro'		142,438
Stockton		11,004
Amble		21,228

^{*}Prob. including Hartley and Seaton Sluice.

In one respect there was no technical change. All of this coal was cut from the coalface by pick, wedge, hammer and human muscle.

In relative terms the London export trade became of less importance as time went by, because increasing quantities were consumed by local industry. Thus by 1867 Tees-side alone produced about a million tons of pig iron, equal to the entire output of the U.S.A.

== Functioning of the cartel ==
=== Governance ===
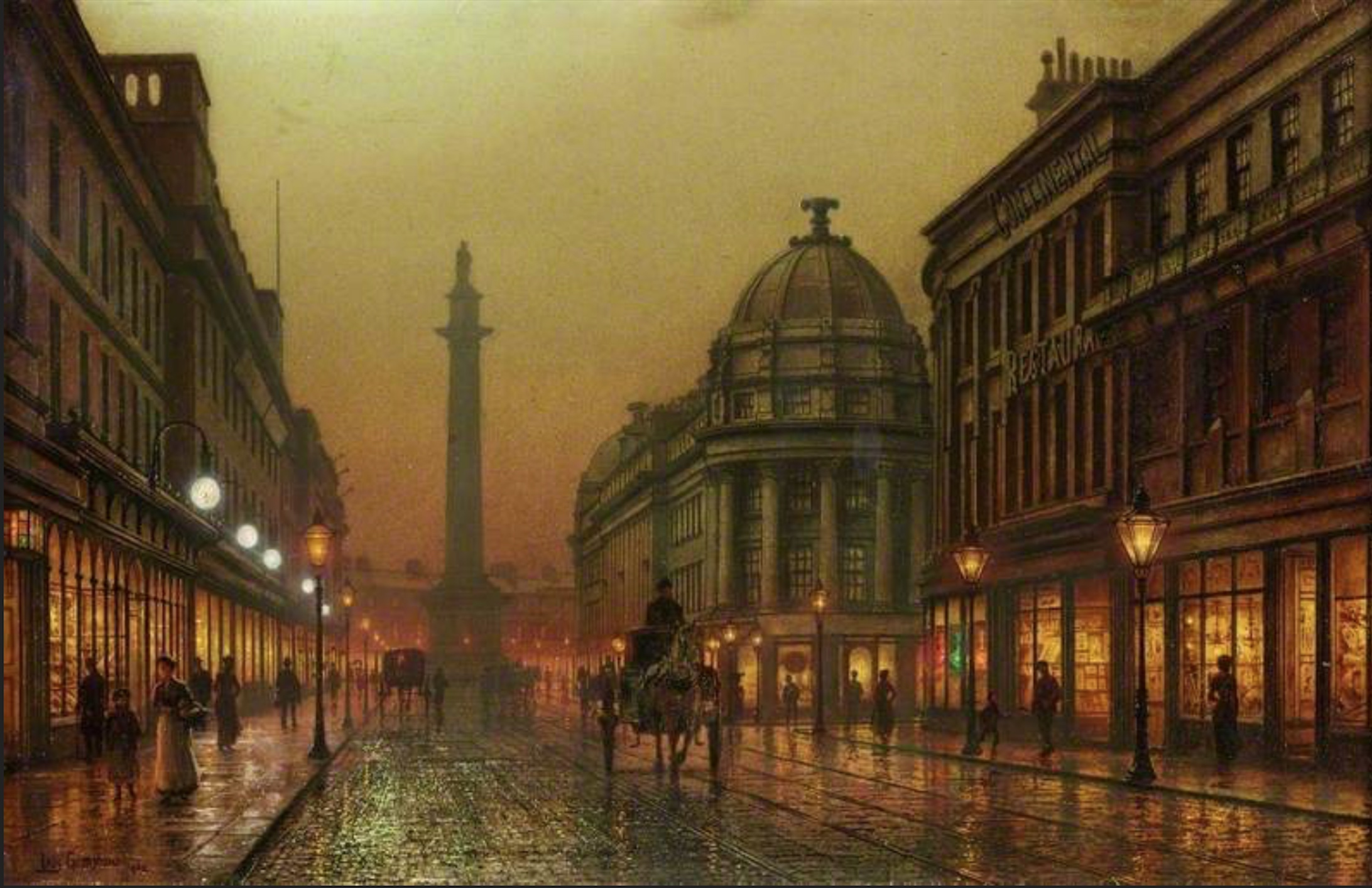
Grainger Street, Newcastle upon Tyne (Louis Hubbard Grimshaw, oil on board, Laing Art Gallery)

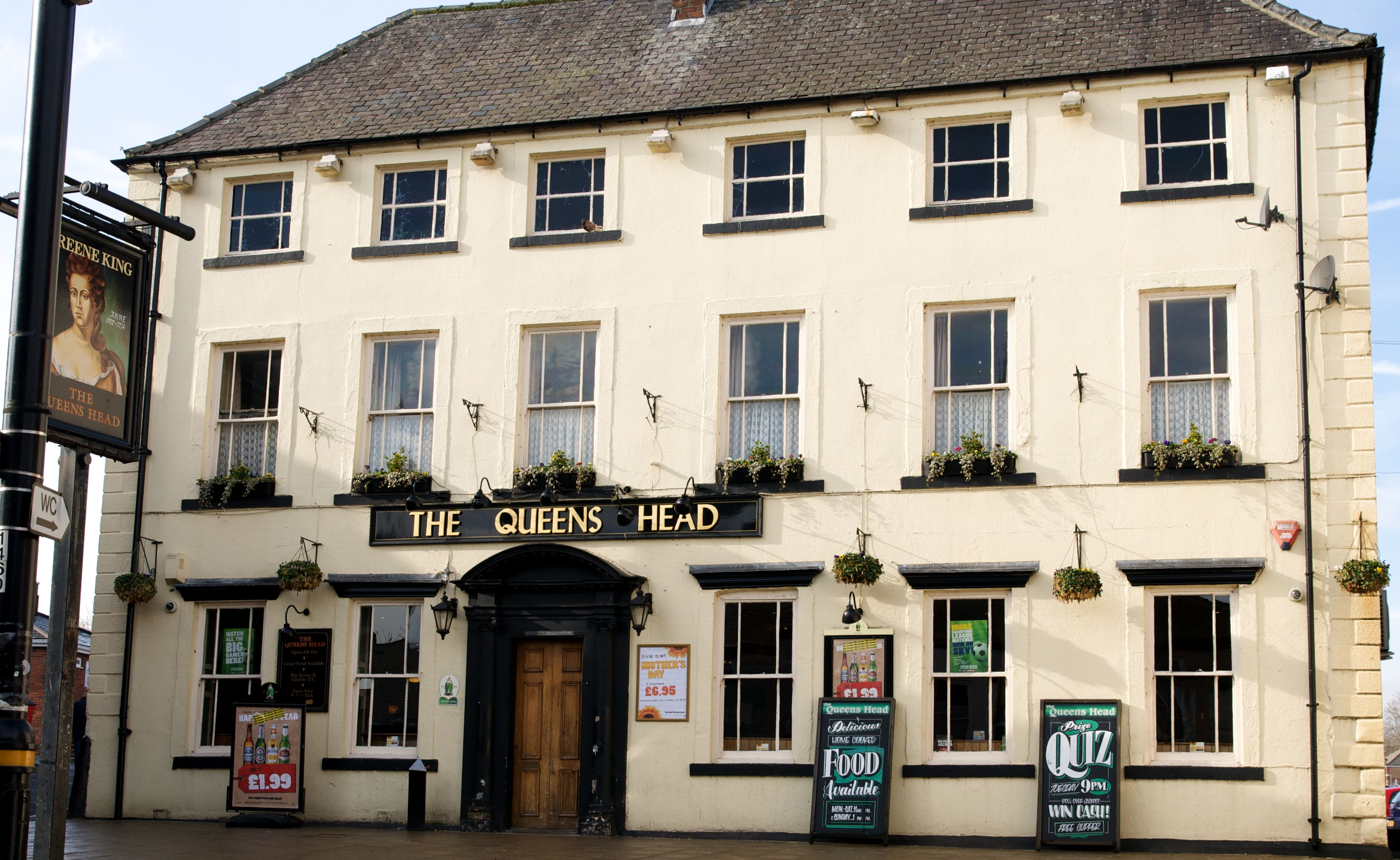
Chester-le-Street, meeting town of the cartel's Wear committee (The Queen's Head in 2010)

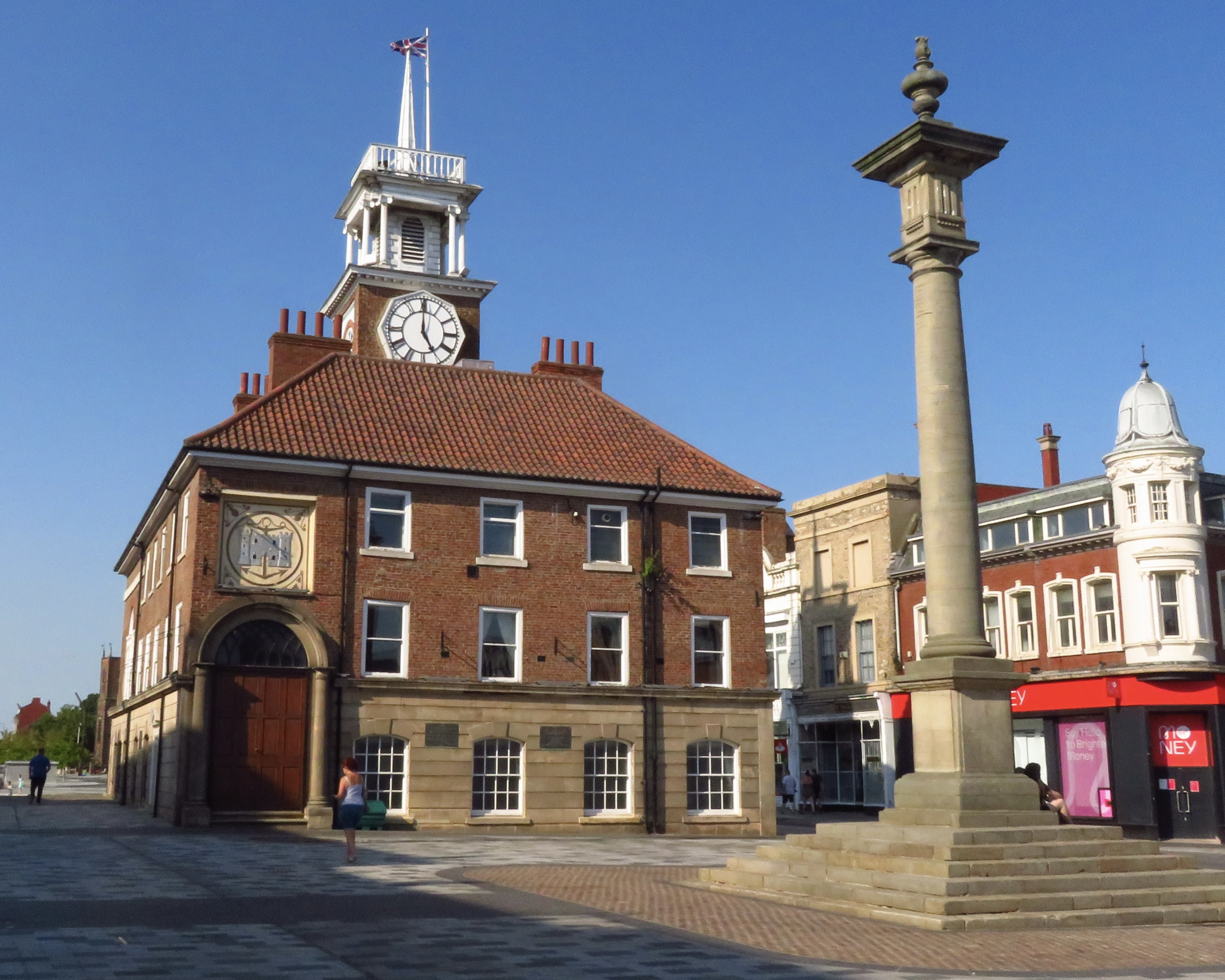
Stockton-on-Tees, meeting town of the cartel's Tees committee (Old Town Hall in 2022)

Each river had its own governance and administration; their systems were not the same and, except for the Tyne, details are rather sketchy. The Tyne had many mine owners, so it was not practical to have frequent general meetings. General policy was decided at an annual meeting where prices were fixed and colliery proportions ("the Basis") agreed; each colliery had one vote. It was specified that the agreement did not enter into force unless and until every mine owner signed up. A printed set of detailed rules for 1835 was put before Parliament and can be read as an external link to this article.

The owners appointed representatives, who elected a committee; it administered the system on a day-to-day basis. On the Wear, where mines were larger, owners few, this small group constituted the Wear committee without need for delegation. The Tyne committee met at Newcastle, the Wear committee at Chester-le-Street, the Tees committee apparently at Stockton.

The committees also met jointly and were called the United Committee. The main business was to decide the issue or quantities of coals to be supplied to the coastwise trade next month. (As explained the object was to keep London prices high but not so high as to provoke competition from other coalfields.) Thus, the monthly vend, allowed to each individual mine, was arrived at on the Basis already agreed. From 1835, it was fixed fortnightly instead of monthly.

If there were disputes between the rivers the United Committee tried to resolve them by consensus, failing which the system broke down and there might be a "fighting trade", which everybody dreaded. In 1829 the Tyne and the Wear agreed to resolve their disputes by a system of arbitration and in 1834 the Tees, Hartley and Blyth joined in.

Summarised Elaine S. Tan:

It had a centralized and professional monitoring infrastructure made up of about 30 to 40 representatives, with a common office and a secretary. These met to determine ... quotas for each mine and inspected monthly output, the amount of which had to be sworn before a magistrate. They also forfeited deposits and imposed fines on collieries that exceed their quotas. Transacted prices for each mine were available to all cartel members; together with limited points of shipment, and verification of output levels with data from customs houses and sale points, opportunities to cheat were reduced further.

=== Records ===
Anti-trust scholar John M. Connor wrote: "This so-called Newcastle Vend kept meticulous price archives and became among the first cartels to be studied by modern scholars who were interested in applying quantitative methods to price-fixing conduct. The availability of detailed purchase records has permitted sophisticated econometric modeling of the London coal cartels".

=== Quotas ===
Quotas were the main point of argument since each mine wanted a better share of the vend. At first quotas were settled by discussion and consensus, each mine trying to persuade the meeting that it could produce more and better coal and should be allowed to do so.

From 1823 a more objective system was adopted for settling disputes, called references. In a reference inspectors looked at factors such as royalties payable, number of pits, their depths, shaft widths, inclination of seam, distance to water, and so on.

=== Prices ===
There was much less contention over prices since, once quotas had been fixed, and the producers of the best coals had named their prices for the coming year, the others could estimate how much to discount their inferior varieties. Since a mine wanted to sell all of its quota, but not too cheaply, there was no point in fixing its price too high or too low.

Prices were listed and could not be changed until next year; however, a mine that had made a genuine miscalculation and found it could not sell its quota was usually allowed an adjustment by the committee.

The prices charged to ships in the northeast, being fixed for the year, did not fluctuate seasonally, whereas prices in London could fluctuate a great deal, even day by day, since they depended on demand, supply and the weather.

=== Legality ===
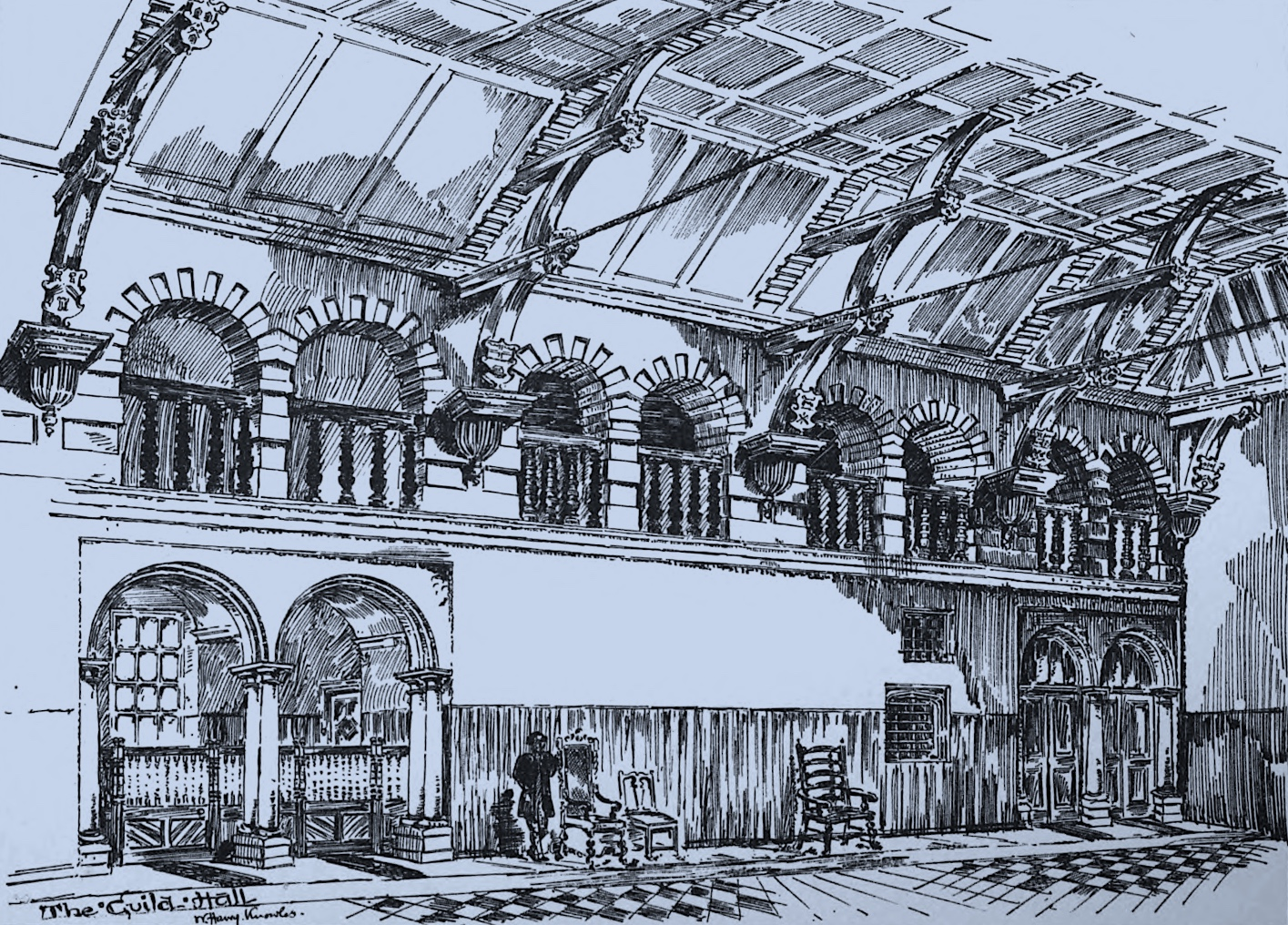
The Guildhall, Newcastle, scene of criminal trials (W.H. Knowles, 1890)

The north east coal cartel existed over a period of history when societal and legal attitudes to restraints on trade were fluctuating. The courts never pronounced on the Limitation of the Vend's legality. In particular it was never explicitly decided that it — or any industrial cartel, for that matter — was a criminal conspiracy at common law attracting a prison sentence, although there was certainly a strand of legal opinion to that effect. The common law as understood in England and America shared much the same uncertainty until the 1890s, when they diverged; in America, the Sherman Act presaged an aggressive pursuit of cartels, but in England the courts established that, although a cartel is a void contract that will not be enforced, it is not a tort or a crime at common law.

However, in 1710 Parliament passed "An act to dissolve the present, and prevent the future combination of coal-owners, lightermen, masters of ships, and others, to advance [raise] the price of coals, in prejudice of the navigation, trade, and manufactures of this kingdom, and for the further encouragement of the coal-trade". The Act prescribed substantial fines for violations, though not jail sentences. An Act of Parliament was only half the story: a jury might not convict.

In 1795 one Errington, who had inherited a share in a mine in North Shields, but discovered its produce was selling poorly, for which he blamed the cartel, deposed witnesses and launched a prosecution against six individuals who (he said) were the Tyne Committee. They were indicted, not for breaching the 1710 Act, but for a common law conspiracy; presumably, so they might receive a jail sentence. The proceedings were transferred from Newcastle to York for jury prejudice. The case never came on for trial. As was common at that time, it was a private prosecution; the prosecutor told Parliament he had lost enthusiasm.

It seems the cartel was believed to be illegal in the locality itself, though morally justified. The town clerk of Newcastle told Parliament:

I saw a body of men, highly respectable in situation, and highly responsible in character, entering into a measure, without attempt of disguise or concealment, which, in my humble judgement, was not strictly legal.

From their conduct it would seem the Limitation thought they ran little danger of a being convicted by a jury, but knew it was no use going to law to enforce their cartel's rules.

=== Enforcement ===
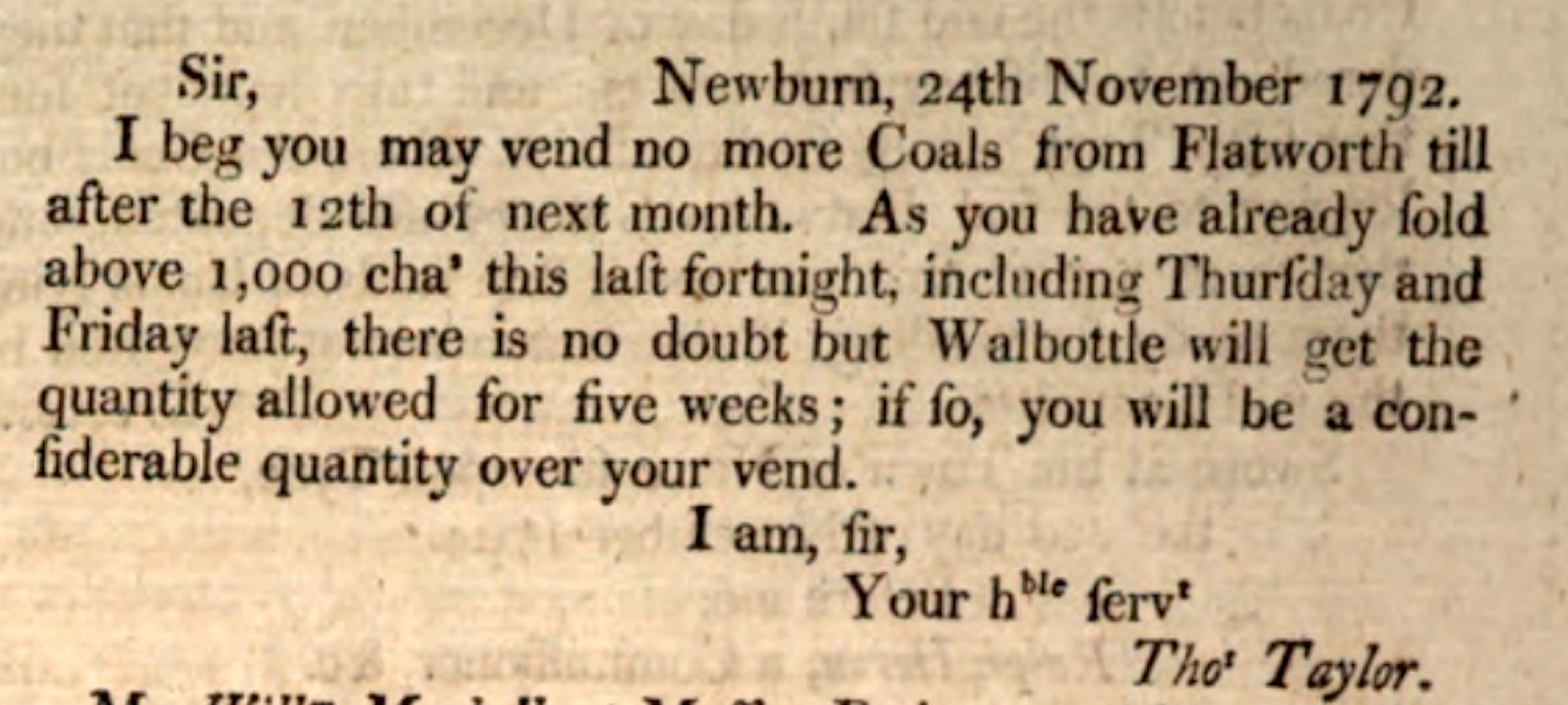
Warning from the secretary

It was to the interest of each mine to be seen to be complying with the cartel's regulations, since it encouraged the others to behave likewise. Mutual compliance was more likely if mine owners believed significant cheating was difficult or impossible.

As to that, explained William J. Hausman:

Enforcement mechanisms (crucial for success) varied in their particulars over the years, but by far the most important component of enforcement was the availability of information. The points of shipment were few enough that it was impossible for any large-scale cheating to go undetected, although chiseling and overmeasure were always possible.

==== Through points of shipment ====
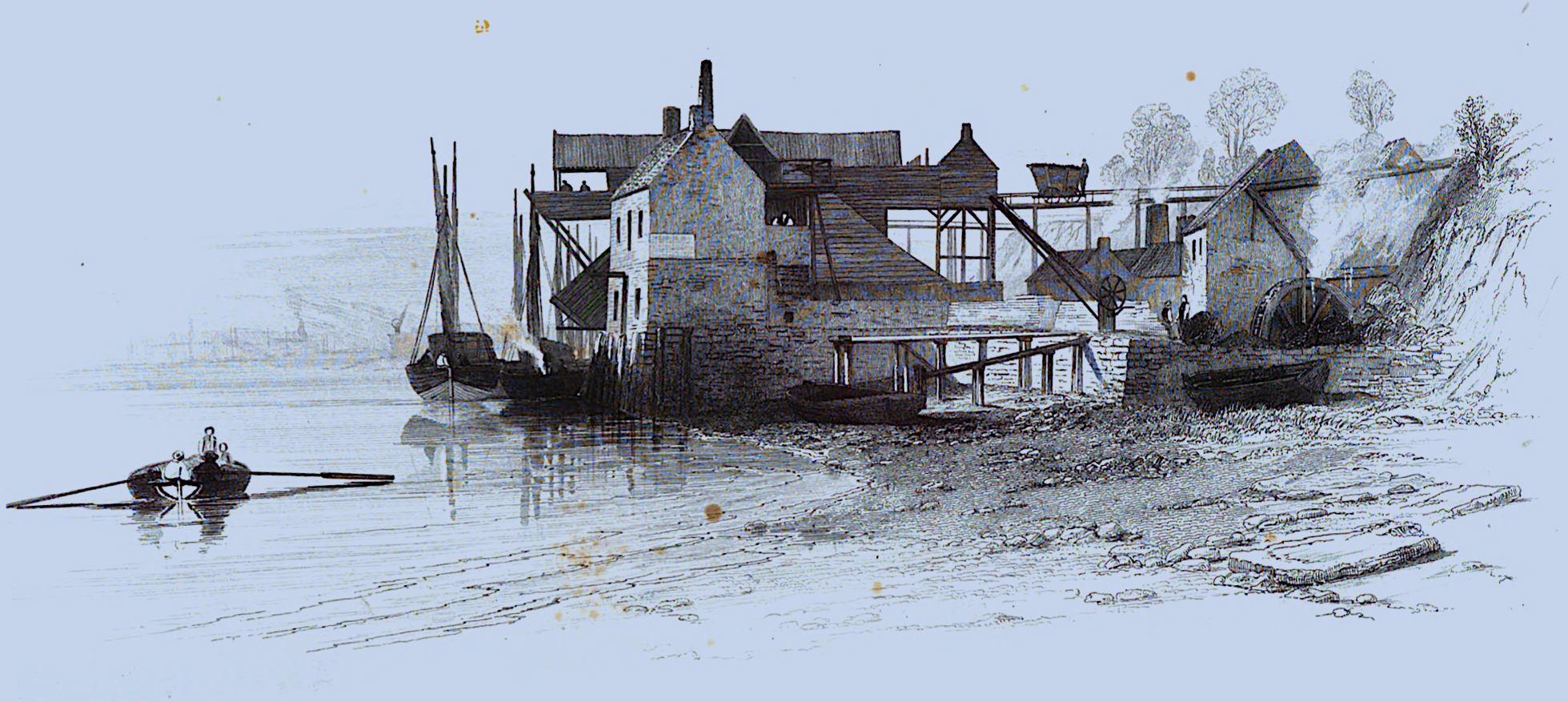
Benwell Staith (Hair, Views) on the river Tyne, upstream from Newcastle

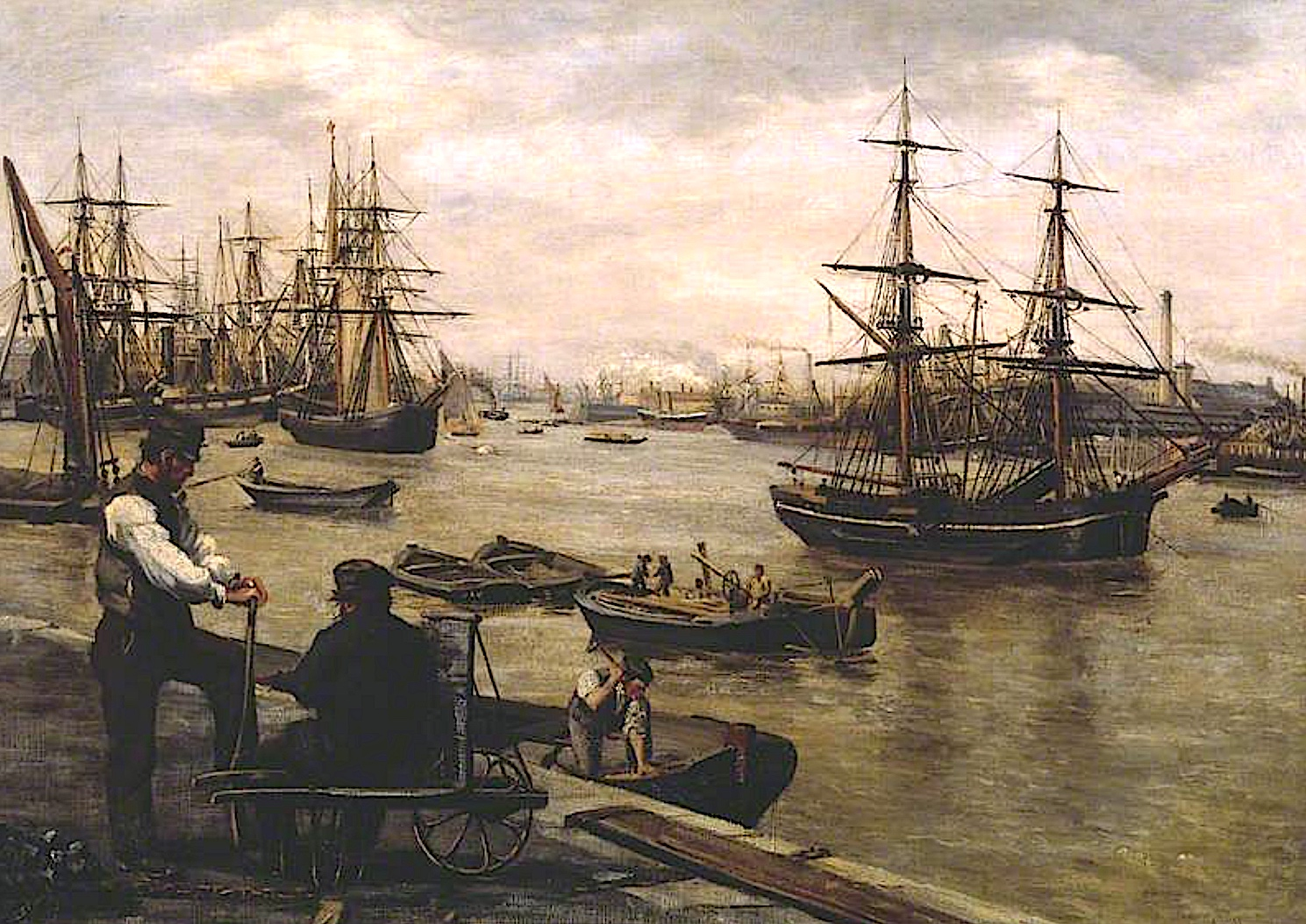
The Pool of London (Matthew White Ridley: Tate). Notice the artist's name.

The points of shipment were staiths, similar to waterside piers; from thence coals were transferred to keels (sailing barges), which carried them downriver to waiting colliers. A keel was marked with nails to denote government-certified loadlines; thus loaded, it carried a definite weight of coal; further weighing was unnecessary. Later, and increasingly, staiths were located below bridges and loaded the seagoing ships directly through spouts. The Customs authorities (and anyone else) could tell how much coal was being sent to a spout since "all the waggons below the bridge were of like dimensions, being made conformable to the Custom House gage, and examined, and branded, by the officers, with the Custom House mark, before they were allowed to be used".

A class of business persons called fitters was responsible for getting the coal from staith to ship and seeing everybody got paid. When a ship's master wanted to buy coal he approached a fitter, who was an agent representing one or more mines. Fitters owned the keels and paid the keelmen for their services. The fitter personally guaranteed that the shipowners were reliable payers and that the promised coal was up to the specified quality. Furthermore, the fitter cleared the shipments through Customs and saw to the paperwork, without which the cargoes could not be imported into London. When business was complete he/she presented the bill to the ship's master. A fitter was thus a person of financial standing. A number of fitters are known to have been women, even in the 18th century.

The reason coal had to be cleared through Customs was that, until 1831, there was a heavy internal tariff on coal exported coastwise from the northeast. Indeed, the fitters were the successors of the medieval Hostmen: the men who were given trading privileges in exchange for seeing that the government tax was paid. After 1831 coal still had to be customs cleared since (until 1850) there were duties to pay on its export to foreign countries.

To gather intelligence the Committee sent agents round to the "staithmen" and required them to deliver accounts; they had to appear before a magistrate and swear to their truth. The Customs figures were supplied to the committee, who also received reports of sales from their agents in London.

==== Through shipping ====
In 1827 the Tyne Committee resolved to charge an extra 10 shillings per chaldron — a punitive rate — to any ship found to be dealing with blacklisted mines. It seems this scheme did not work very well, however.

==== Through the coal factors of London ====
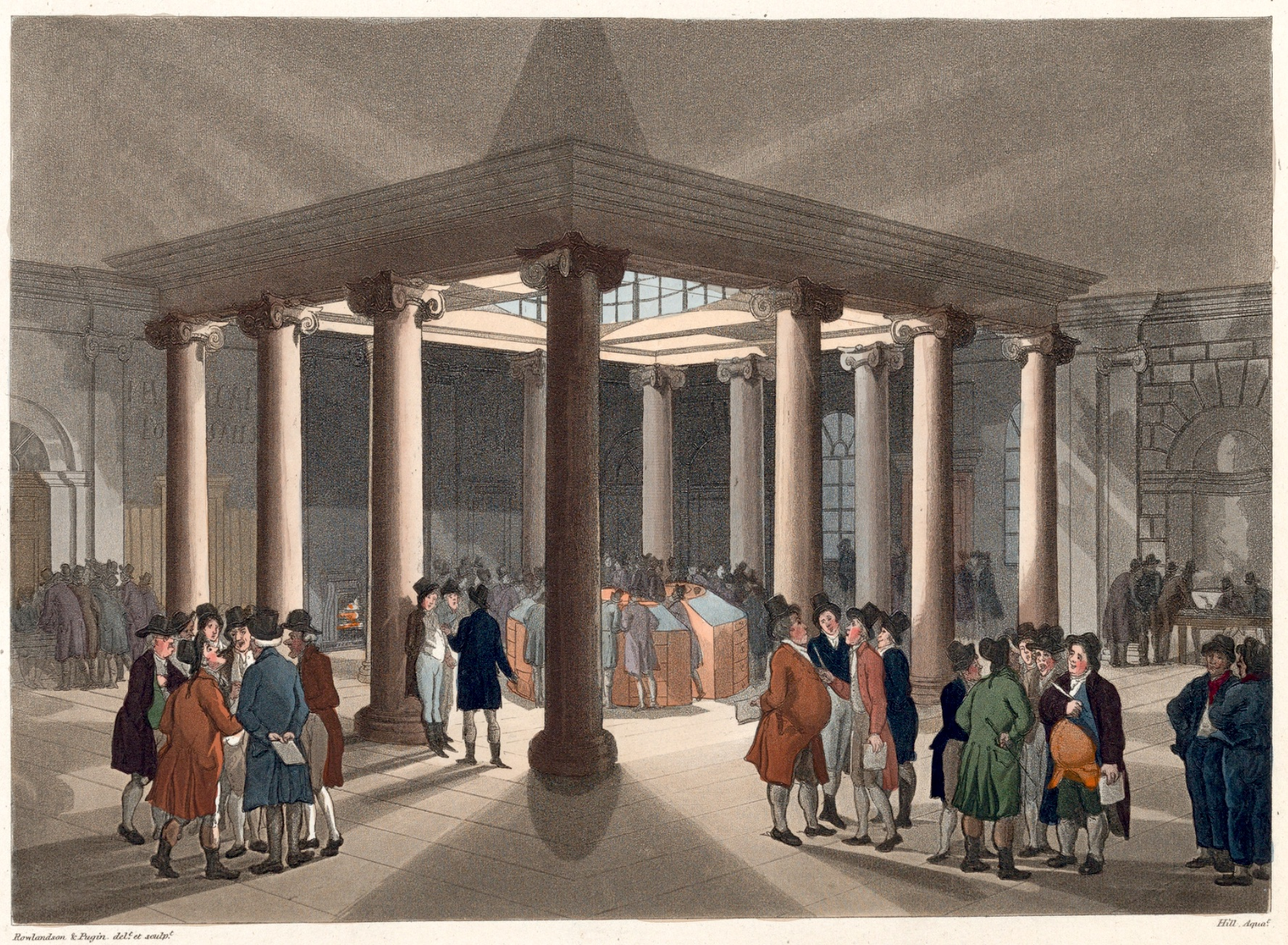
The Coal Exchange, London, where factors sold ships' cargoes (Thomas Rowlandson and Augustus Pugin, 1808, Metropolitan Museum of Art)

When ships arrived in London and wanted to sell their cargoes they employed agents called factors, experienced businessmen who knew the coal market, and how to get a ship through the system. Factors handled the paperwork to clear the ship through customs, paid the taxes, provided credit, and negotiated the sale of her cargo to buyers on the London Coal Exchange. In due course the buyer(s) sent lighters, barges which relieved the ship of her cargo as she lay in the Pool of London. In theory a ship could employ anyone as a factor, though in practice most were loyal to one particular individual.

The Port of London was usually congested with colliers, most of which did not use docks in the modern sense but were moored in tiers along the river, "provoking accidents and congesting the channel". A harbour-master recalled having to cope with "900 sail of colliers between Gravesend and London Bridge". It seems a collier did not spend most of her time sailing, but tied up in the Port of London.

Because of weather conditions a large number of ships might be held up and then arrive all together in the Thames in a bunch, causing coal prices to plunge, as well as adding to the prevailing congestion. Hence the coal trade and the Port of London were continually evolving a system to smooth out deliveries. Details varied; but essentially, ships' papers were put in a bureaucratic queue in the order of their arrival, and they were called forward for berthing and unloading in their proper turn. Factors were involved in this.

At the insistence of the Limitation of the Vend, and from 1834 on, if too many cargoes were being offered on the Coal Exchange on any one day — typically, more than 50 — and prices were slumping, a moratorium was declared and no more ships could be processed until the next trading day. While this system helped to even out the flow, it did mean that some ships lay idle in the Thames for weeks before getting a chance to unload. The system never worked perfectly, and in practice there were various methods of jumping the queue, called "deviations", and a strong incentive to do it.

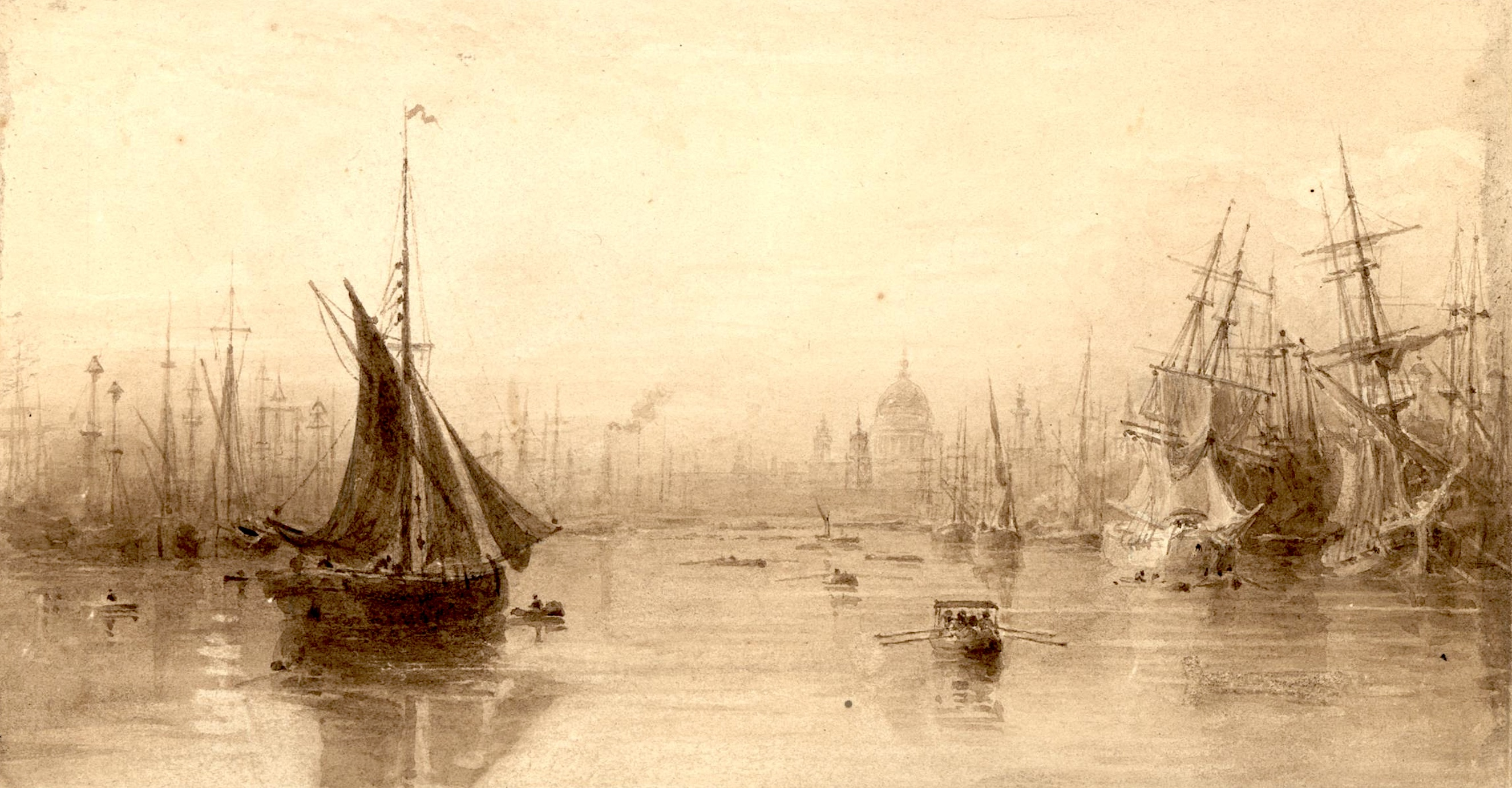
Finding a berth was a challenge: view of the Pool of London from the river (Peter de Wint, pen and ink with brown wash, British Museum)

The Limitation of the Vend objected to deviations, perhaps because they disrupted the London market. They put pressure on the London coal factors to smooth the market and report offenders. They increasingly tried to foist their own choice of factor on the captain. The cartel's chairman said in his 1836 evidence to the House of Commons:

If you were to come to my office, and ask me whether I would sell you coal or not? I should say certainly, and my price is so and so, provided you choose to go to my factor... my property is only safe in that gentleman's hands, and if you do not choose to go to him, you may go and buy your coals elsewhere.

It became a cartel rule — increasingly evaded, though — that no ship would be loaded unless the captain signed an agreement to use a named factor, who was given power to detain the vessel to comply with the turn. Further, the ship was to abide by the turn regulations or pay a substantial penalty. Ships reported for deviations were put on a blacklist. Despite this, "attempts of ship-masters to evade the turn system continued, and on an ever-increasing scale".

=== Sanctions ===
Mines that exceeded their sales quotas were not necessarily cheating, if they did it openly and accepted the consequences. A system of fines was instituted, the monies to be paid over for the benefit of the mines who undersold their quotas. When the fines were found to be too low — i.e. that it was worth breaching the quota and paying the fine — it was decided to increase them steeply in future, and to deduct the oversale from the mine's next monthly quota.

The cartel's chairman told Parliament the fines were rarely collected in practice, since conciliation prevailed. According to Paul M. Sweezy a stronger deterrent than fining was peer disapproval.

=== Cheating ===
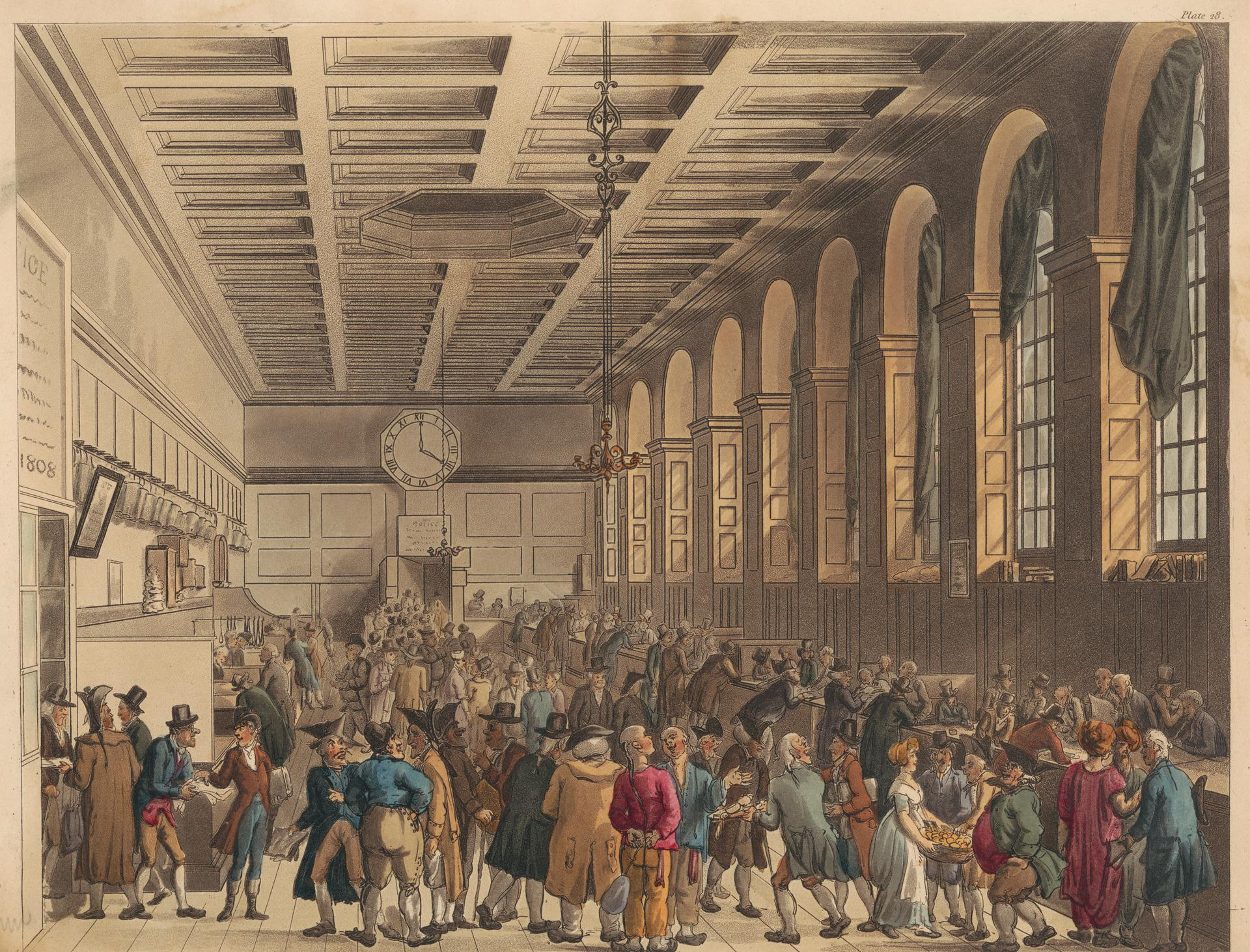
The Long Room, Customs House, London (Thomas Rowlandson, Yale Center for British Art)

According to one scholar there was occasional "chiseling and overmeasure", but not a systematic evasion of the cartel's regulations.

==== Hidden discounts or extra weight ====
An obvious way to sell under list price was to give a ship a hidden discount, either as a secret cash payment to her owners, or as a kickback to the captain. Another obvious dodge was to give ships surreptitious extra weight, which was sometimes suspected. From 1820 Customs officials were directed not to allow waggons to be heaped, which had been a frequent abuse. According to John Buddle's admission in a private letter:

In the terrible years of 1832-3 great measure was generally given at all the ports — by the Coal-owners to induce the capt[ain]s to load — instead of money bribes... the most usual mode was by loading the Waggons excessively, by putting 26 or 27 Bolls of Coals into them instead of 24 — and this we were obliged to do as well as our neighbours.

In 1825 the Tyne committee appointed well-paid inspectors to check the over-loading of waggons and keels. They caught seven collieries in the act.

However, as explained above the loading of ships was usually done in plain sight of everyone, and there were the Customs authorities to think of. From 1812 ships could not be loaded until the fitter had delivered a certificate "expressing the real quantity of Coals"; the customs officer had to enter it in a book open to public inspection. Customs officials were entitled to view the loading. The paperwork had to be produced to the Customs authorities in London. In any case the quantities unloaded in London were officially measured or weighed and published on the Coal Exchange, though corruption was certainly possible. The inspectors who caught the offending collieries (above) threatened to report them to the revenue.

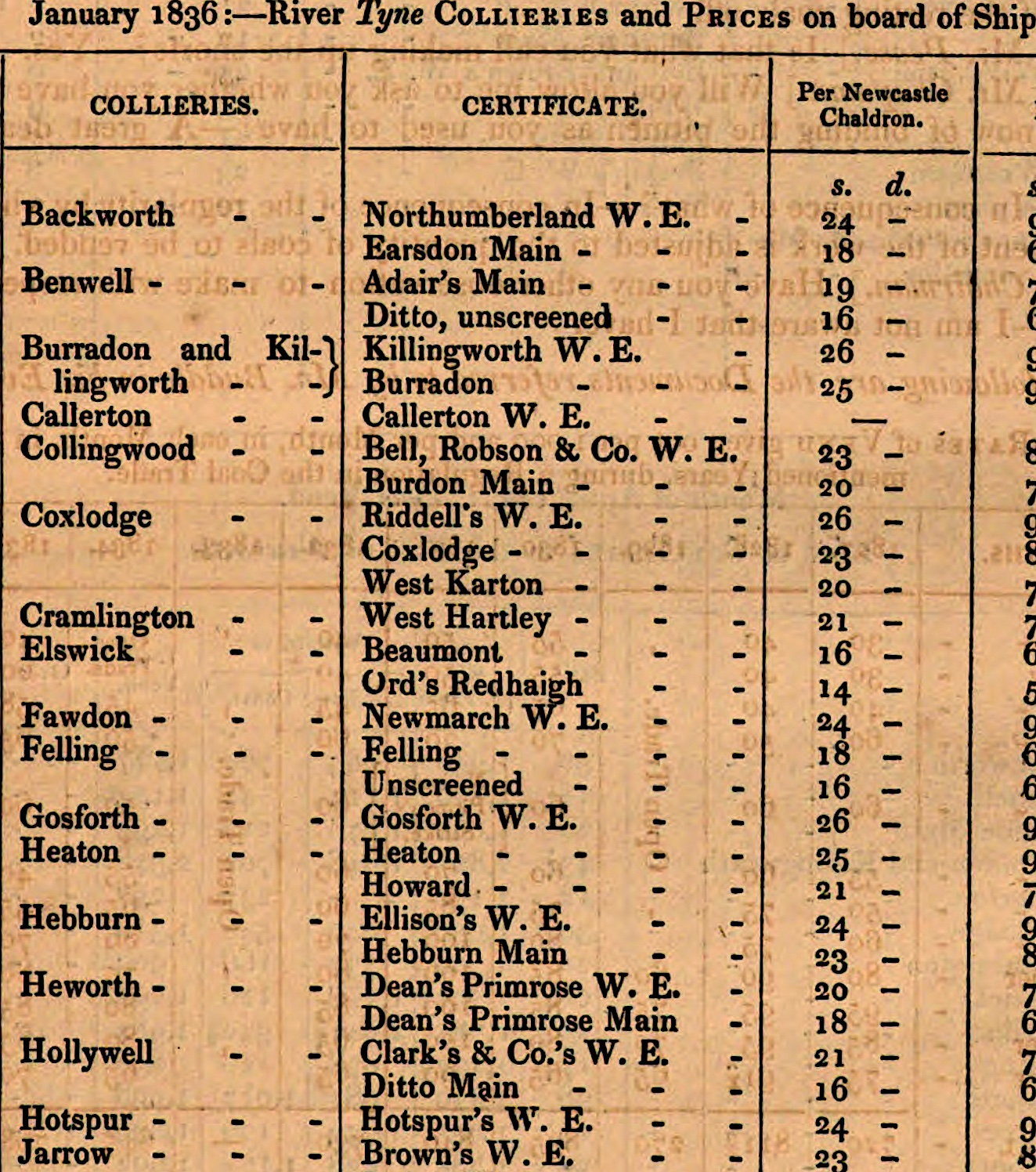
Wholesale prices were quoted by mine; some mines offered several grades

==== Disguised quality ====
Still another inducement was to pretend to sell one quality of coal (e.g. Eden-main — by the 1830s a cheap grade) on the understanding that a better one (e.g. Wallsend) would be delivered really.

==== Hidden premiums to London buyers ====
On the London Coal Exchange there was an illegal, if widespread practice of paying secret "premiums" to buyers to induce them to purchase. Not all coal owners paid them.

==== Effect on cartel ====
On occasions cooperation ceased and a "fighting trade" (price war) broke out in the industry (below). It was not so much because of cheating, but because powerful members stopped cooperating.

== Parliamentary enquiries ==
Five or six times a parliamentary select committee held an inquiry concerning the Limitation of the Vend, examining witnesses and documents. Two of the enquiries – 1829 and 1830 – were instigated by the mine owners themselves, probably to draw attention to the inefficient and fraudulent conduct of the London end of the trade.

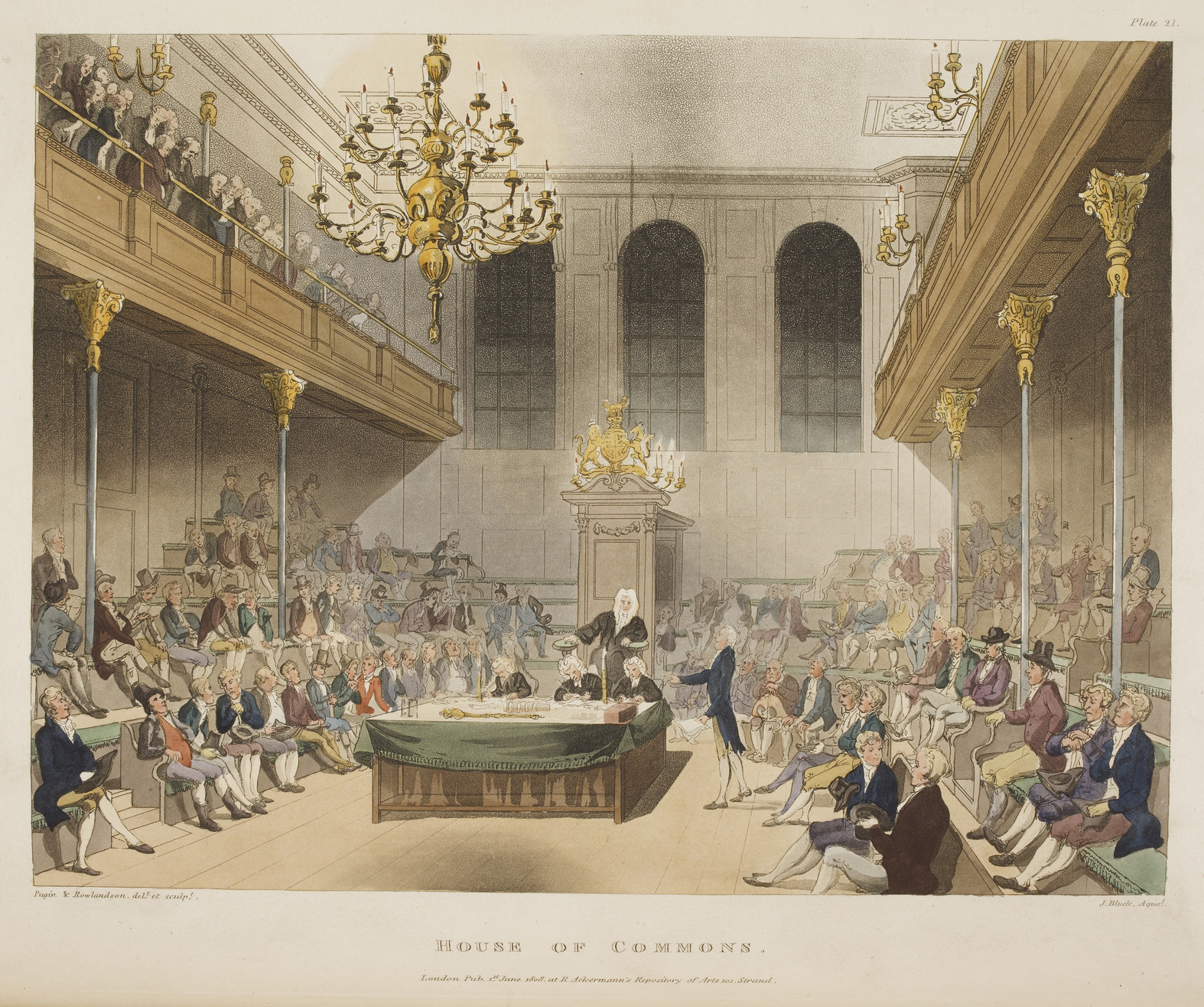
House of Commons in session, 1808 (Thomas Rowlandson and Augustus Pugin, British Library)

Year	Summary of recommendations	Report and evidence
1800 (June)	Detailed investigation, ran out of parliamentary time, but should be investigated further and dealt with.	House of Commons (June 1800) 1803a, pp. 538–639
1800 (December)	That stringent measures to be taken to put down the combination.	House of Commons (December 1800) 1803b, pp. 640–650
1829	The Committee did not report, wrongly believing the cartel had collapsed permanently.	Evidence summarised in Dunn 1844, pp. 71–8
1830	“The trade had better be left to the control of that competition [i.e. from the inland coal trade] which appears already to have affected it".	House of Lords 1830
1836	“That every means of promoting a new supply [i.e. from other coalfields] be encouraged, as furnishing the most effectual means of counteracting the combinations of the coal owners and factors".	House of Commons 1836
1838	No relevant change in the law recommended.	House of Commons 1838

== Disruptive personalities ==
Two forceful personalities, Lord Londonderry and Lord Durham, became powerful members of the cartel. They were social and political rivals and mutually jealous, which made common action on Wearside difficult. Both men were important public figures in their own right. Heads of major coal mining families on Wearside, "they alone possessed the power to bludgeon the trade into submission by forcing a period of free, or 'fighting' trade". "The withdrawal of a Durham or a Londonderry meant the removal of one of the corner-stones on which the entire structure was founded". These men were less interested in the long-term future of the cartel than in securing larger quotas for themselves, and keeping out interlopers. Cashflow problems afflicted both, encouraging short-term thinking. About 1825 a third major player emerged: the Hetton Coal Company.

Wearside contenders

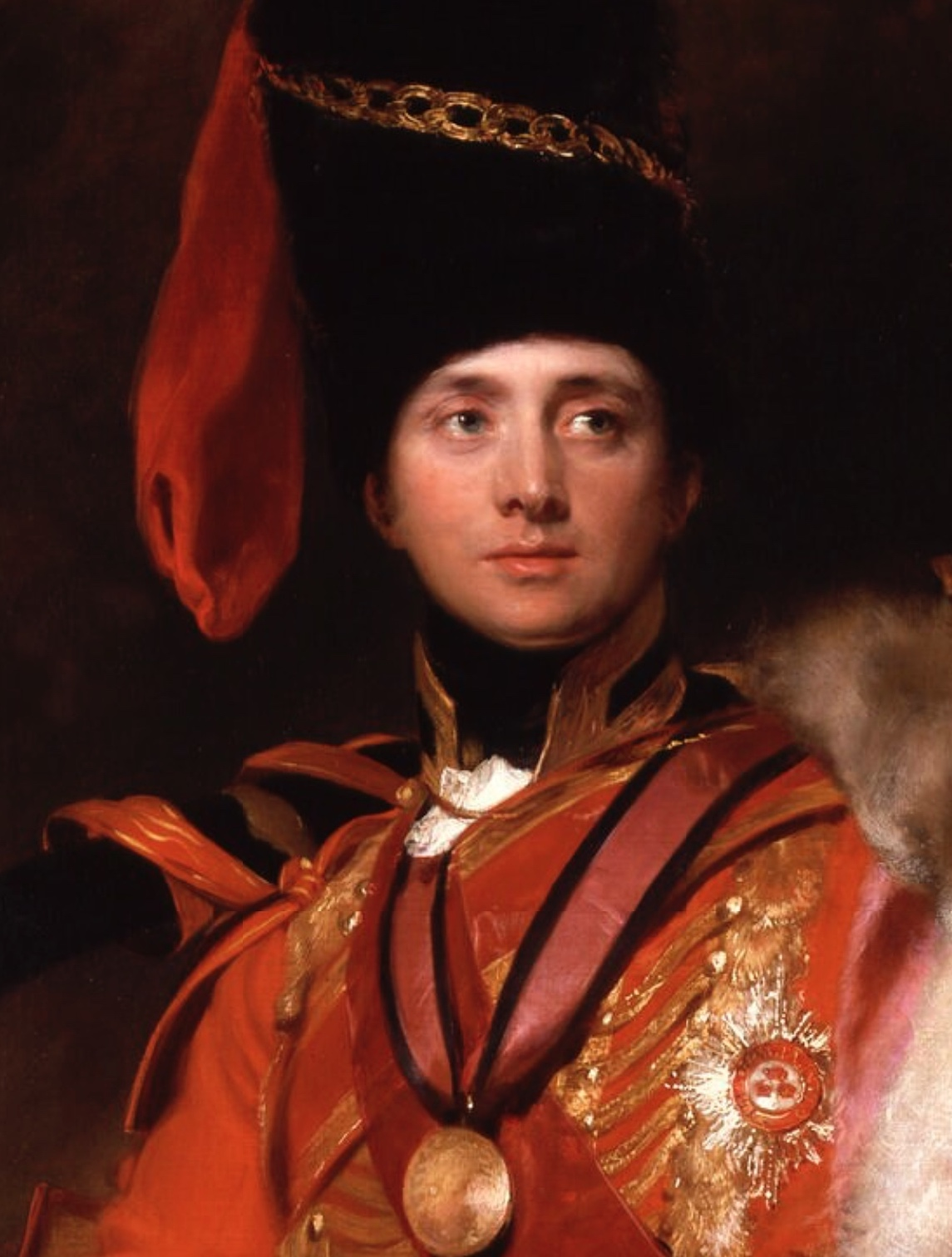
Lord Londonderry

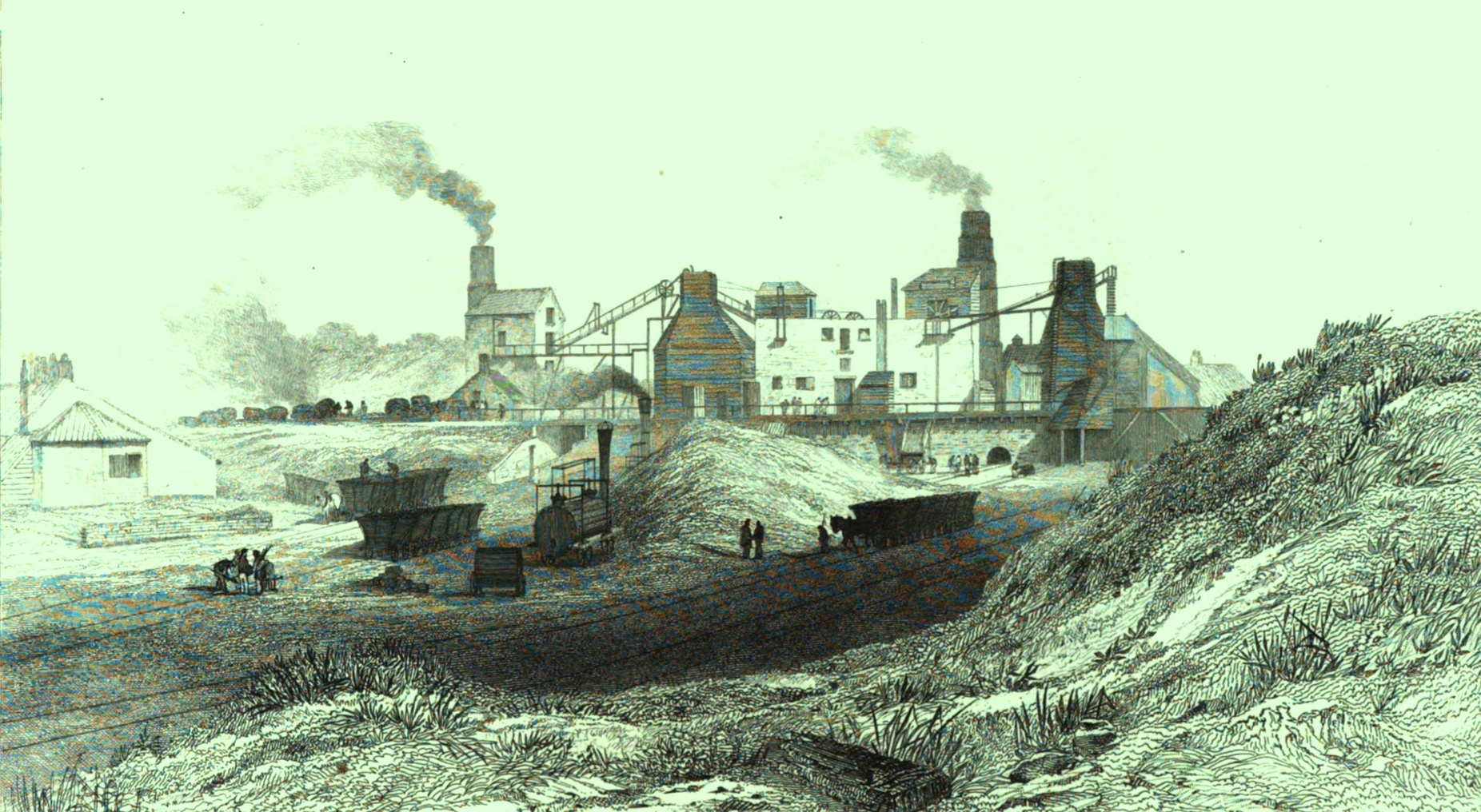
Hetton Colliery: organised by Arthur Mowbray

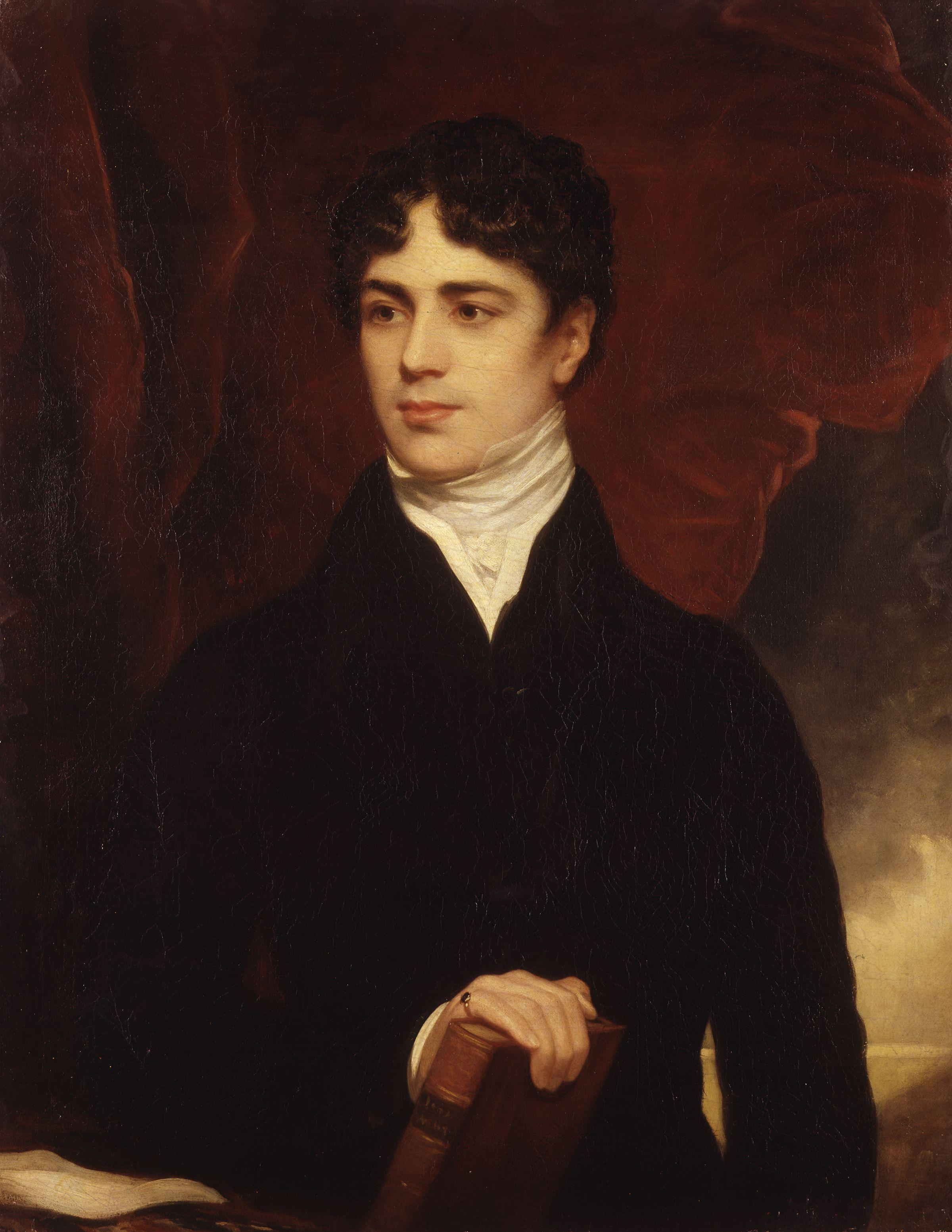
Lord Durham

(Londonderry and Lambton portraits by Thomas Phillips, National Portrait Gallery, London)

=== Lord Londonderry ===
Charles Stewart, 3rd Marquess of Londonderry, mentioned earlier in this article, who was described by The Times as the bravest soldier in the British army, was famous for his impetuous cavalry charges. Badly wounded several times, he had fought two duels. Entering the diplomatic service, he had represented his country in Berlin and Vienna, where he was a notorious womaniser; the Duke of Wellington, who distrusted him, allowed that he had been a good ambassador. Londonderry opposed the Coal Mines Act 1842, holding that child labour had educative value; hence "popular mythology ... unjustly cast him as the arch villain of the north-east coal trade".

=== Lord Durham ===
If Londonderry was a right-wing Tory, John Lambton, 1st Earl of Durham was so far to the left that he was known as Radical Jack. An insomniac who suffered from mood swings, he had eloped with his first wife and married her in Gretna Green. Durham was a seasoned politician: he was instrumental in bringing in the Reform Act 1832. He was British ambassador to Russia, and a Governor-General of Canada, where he played a significant role in Canadian history. He suffered a series of bereavements, losing his son, his mother and three daughters in one year, and took to laudanum. "Haughty and disdainful", probably personally insecure, it was said men were afraid of him.

=== The Hetton Coal Company and Arthur Mowbray ===
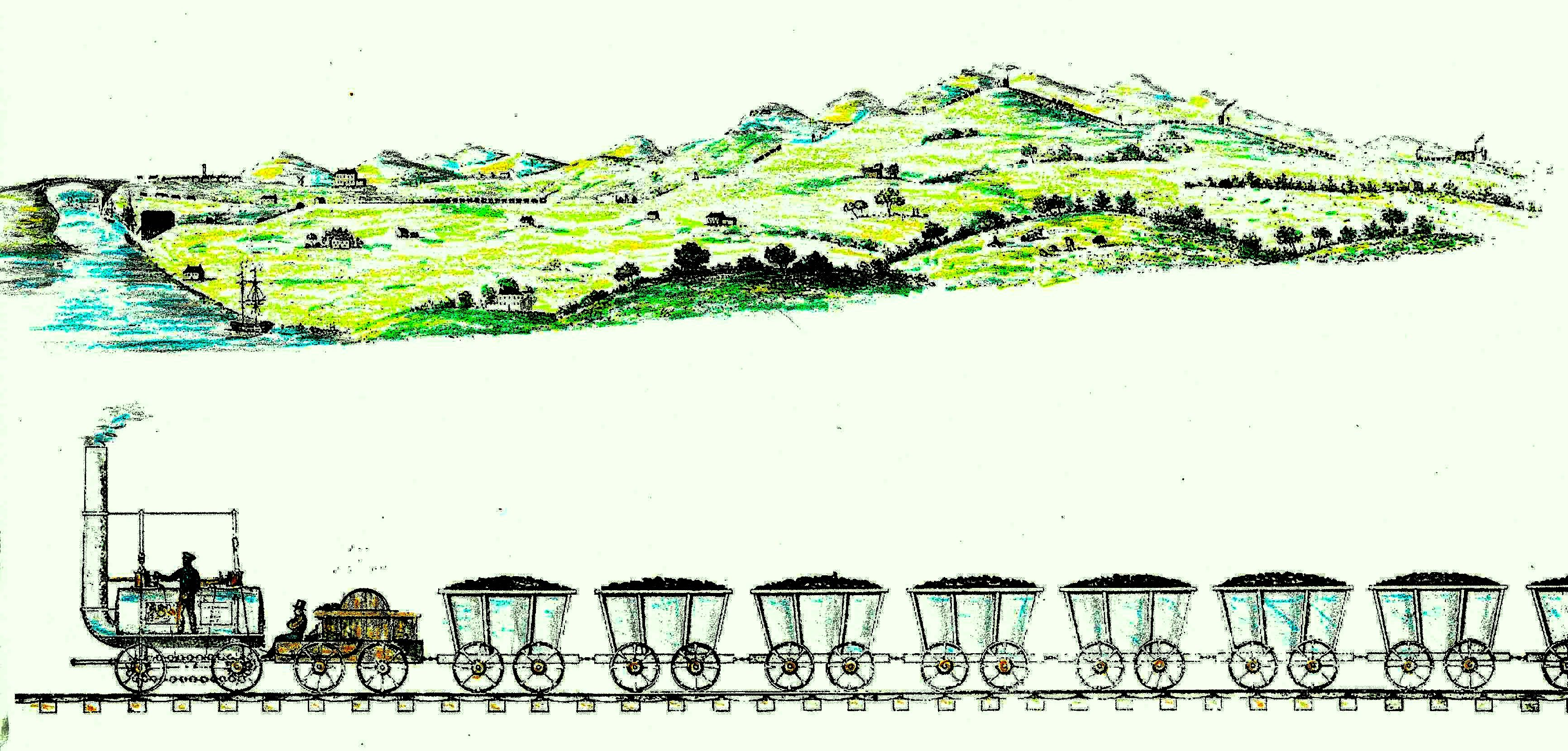
Hetton Coal Company, an innovative interloper backed by many investors, its all-steam railway was running before the Stockton & Darlington opened (after an 1823 print by Bouvier)

The Hetton Coal Company was more like a modern joint stock company than a traditional mine owner; eventually it assembled a "huge" capital.

The man behind it was a failed banker called Arthur Mowbray. During the minority of Frances Anne, the Vane-Tempest coal heiress, she had been a ward of court and her property had been managed by court-appointed trustees; one of these, Mowbray, had managed her coal assets, perhaps not very well. Still under age, the court had allowed her to marry Lord Londonderry, who soon dismissed Mowbray and appointed John Buddle in his stead. For this Arthur Mowbray was aggrieved.

Mowbray turned out to have a talent for finding investors. He got together the syndicate who became the Hetton Coal Company. Locally, they were regarded as upstarts and outsiders (one of them was a common prizefighter looking to invest his winnings). In an immensely risky enterprise, the Hetton Company bought a large landholding in a part of the east Durham coalfield where leading geologists — Adam Sedgwick and William Buckland — had doubted good coal would ever be found. They sank a 900-foot (300 m) shaft through quicksands and the magnesian limestone to strike rich seams of the very best coal. They built a 7-mile railway connecting to the river Wear, designed by George Stephenson, and opened in 1822, before the Stockton & Darlington, and unlike it designed for steam alone.

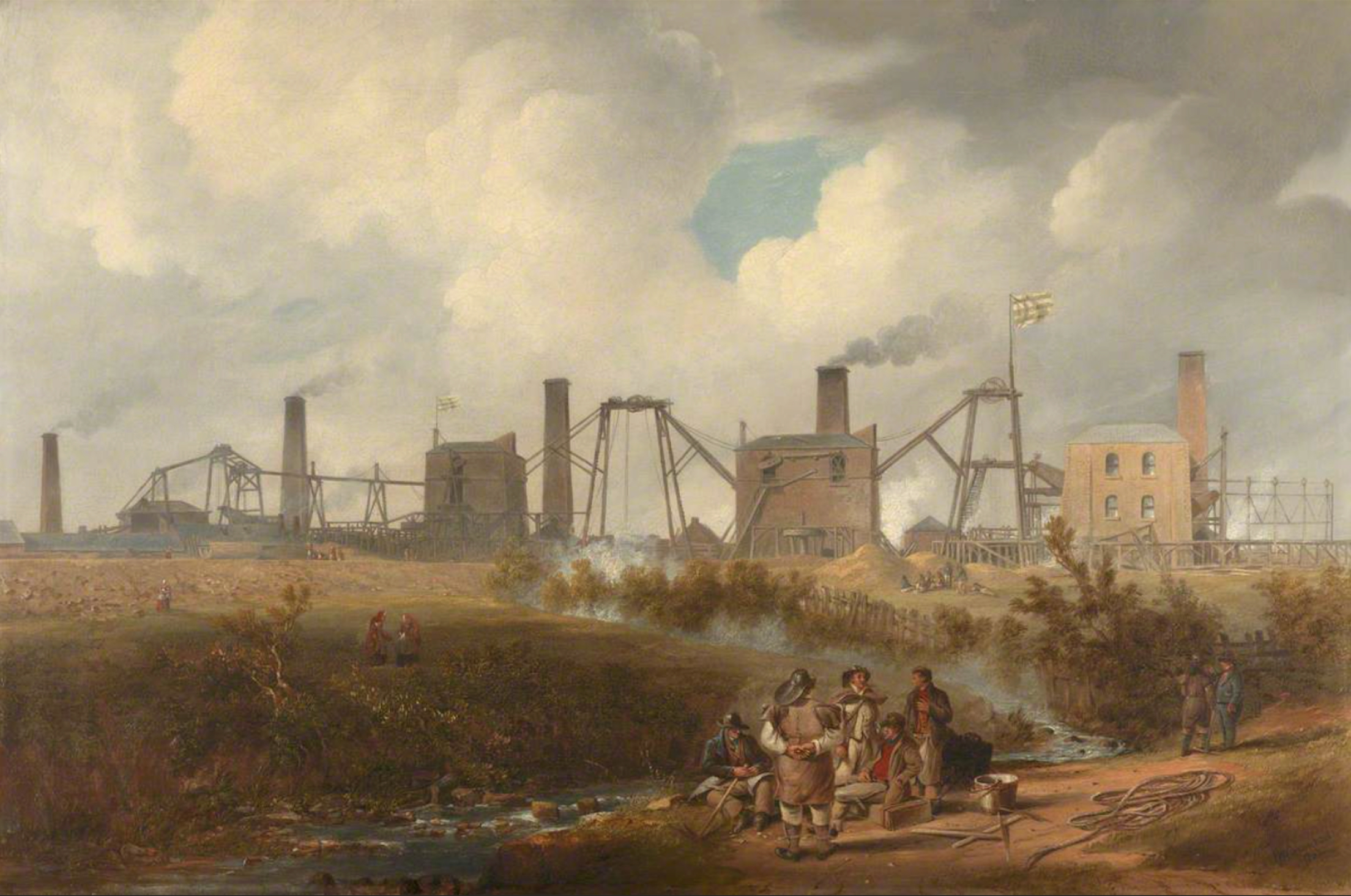
A View of Murton Colliery near Seaham, County Durham, one of 16 new pits sunk under the magnesian limestone (John Wilson Carmichael, 1843: Yale Center for British Art). All wanted large quotas.

The Hetton Coal Company now demanded a quota to equal Durham's and Londonderry's, which the two men bitterly resisted. John Buddle writing to Lord Londonderry said about the interlopers:

I consider the Hetton Co. just now, as a pack of madmen, with swords in their hands slashing about them on all sides ... A[rthu]r [Mowbray] ... will never stop until he involves the whole Coal mining interest of this country in one general ruin.

Lord Durham was heard to say "There was no sacrifice he was not prepared to make" to ruin the Hetton Company if they tried to force a bigger quota. It led to the "fighting trade" of 1829 (below).

Another consequence was that, inspired by the Hetton Coal Company's success, fifteen other major collieries were opened in the same area. There were "more pigs than teats in the trade", wrote Buddle.

== The "fighting trade": suspension and price wars ==
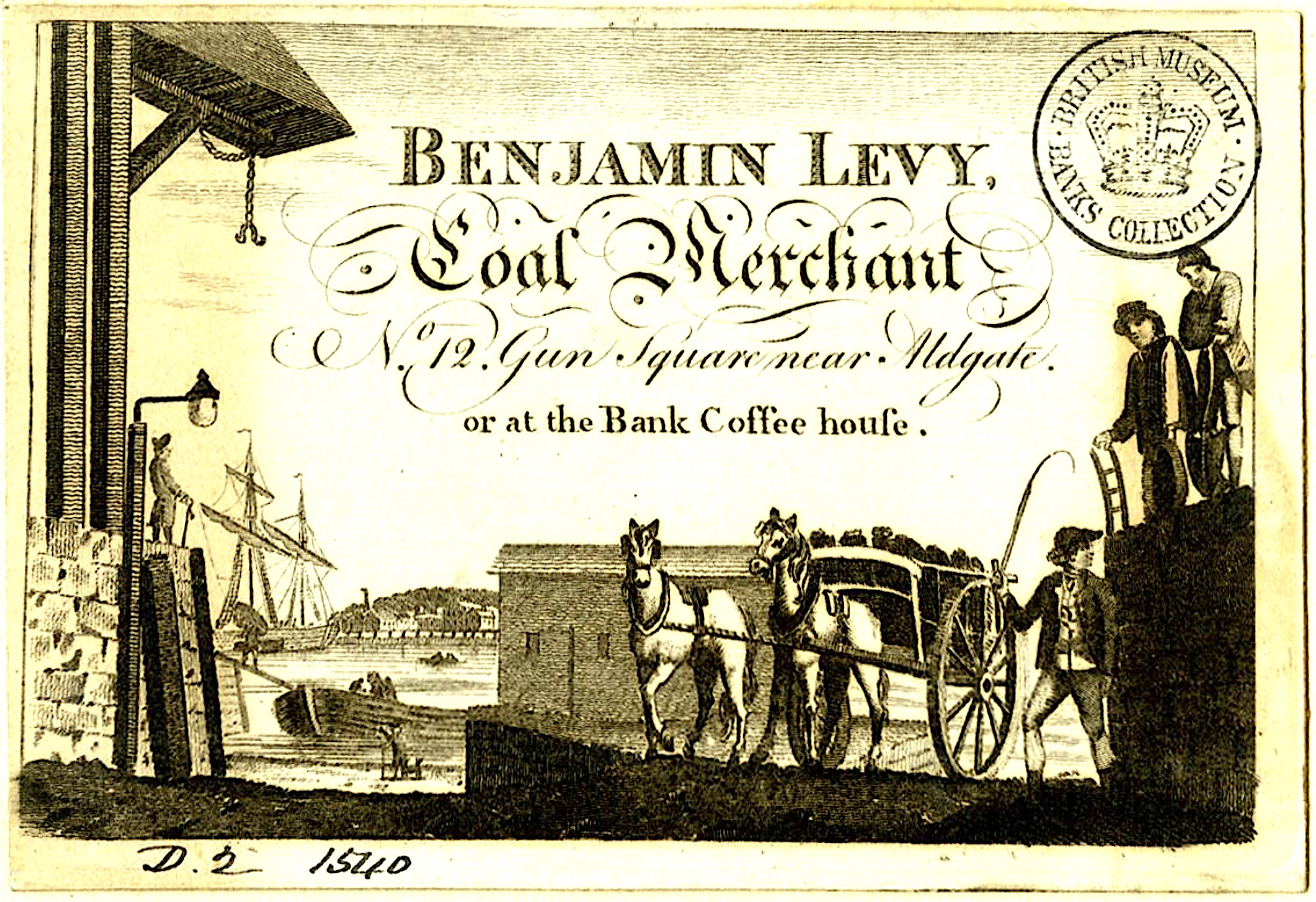
A London coal merchant's trade card, 1780 (British Museum)

The cartel broke down and did not operate 1780-4 because it had failed to include the best colliery, Wiilmington. It also broke down for a period in 1800; possibly in 1812 and 1814; February 1819 to February 1821; September 1824 to July 1825, January 1828 to August 1829; and November 1832 to March 1834. Sweezy wrote about two periods particularly:

=== 1828-9 ===
In 1828 there were disputes between the Tyne and the Wear over quotas; they featured Lords Londonderry and Durham. Unable to resolve them, the United Committee declared the trade open on January 24, 1829. During the ensuing fighting trade the price of best coals in London fell from 40 to 30 shillings per unit. The dispute dragged on until 31 August when the regulation was renewed. To reduce disputes in future an arbitration system was instituted, with appeals.

=== 1832-34 ===
A miner's strike disrupted the regulation, hitting the Tyne harder than the Wear; hence the Wear greatly exceeded its quota. Also the strike-bound mines were supposed to be supported by those in work, but there was disagreement over the details. Lord Londonderry, who had refused to sign the agreement for 1832, refused to chip in on the strike fund. His behaviour was resented. The Hetton Coal Company refused to sign the agreement until it was sorted out. The London price of best Wallsend fell from 21s. 9d. per unit to 15s. 6d., the lowest ever. The Tees mines, not part of the cartel, were doing well. Eventually the long fighting trade disposed everyone to find a solution. The Limitation was resumed on March 1, 1834. The revived cartel now included the Tees.

== The end of the cartel ==
=== Possible causes for cartel collapse ===
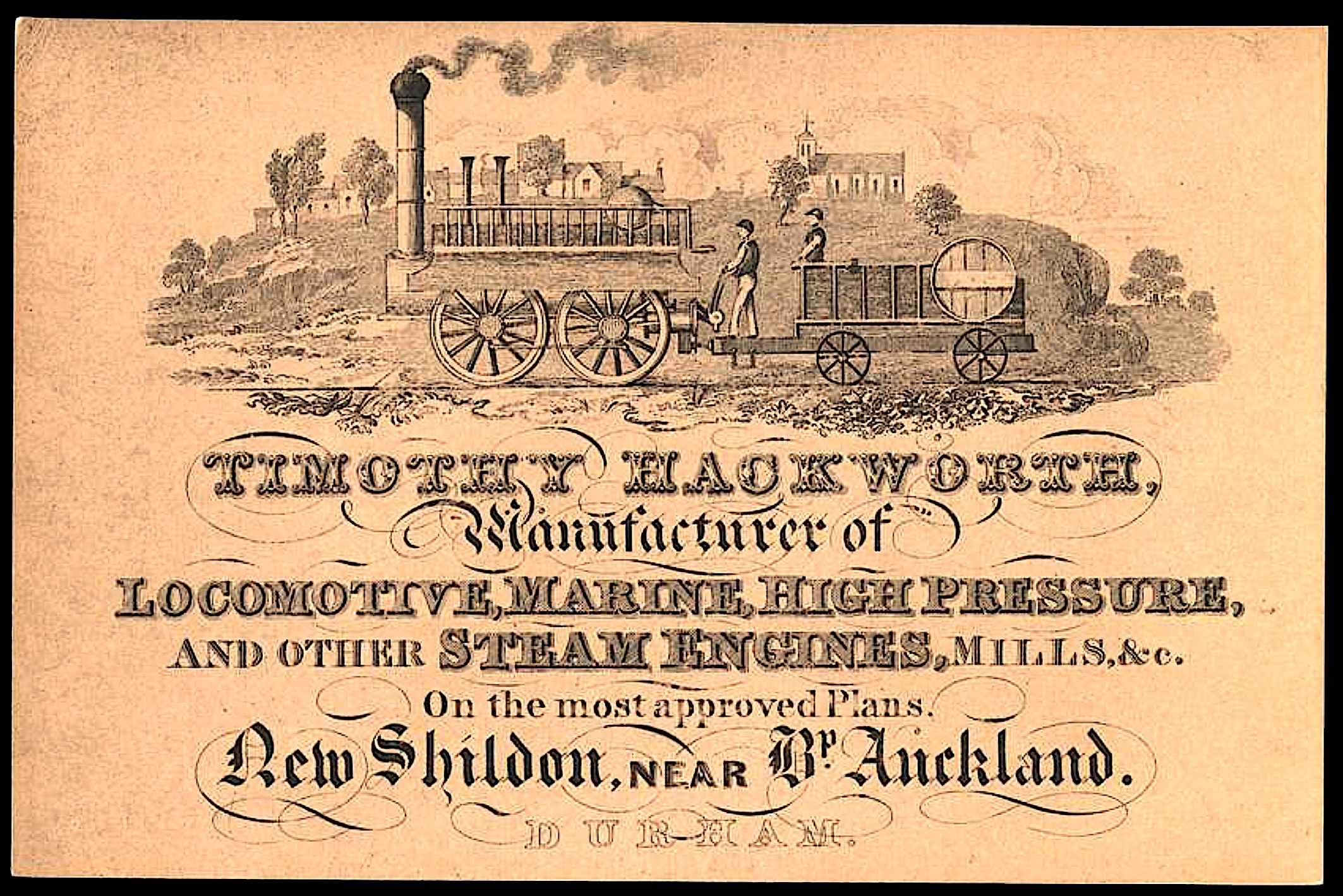
Business card of Timothy Hackworth, locomotive manufacturer (Science Museums Group)

According to a 2006 review of cartel studies, the causes for their breakdown have been found to include

- the erosion of barriers to entry
- too many participants
- the existence of a large "maverick" or noncomformist
- a general belief that others will flout the rules or cheat
- internal conflict and defection.

=== Erosion of barriers to entry ===
==== The coming of public coal-carrying railways ====
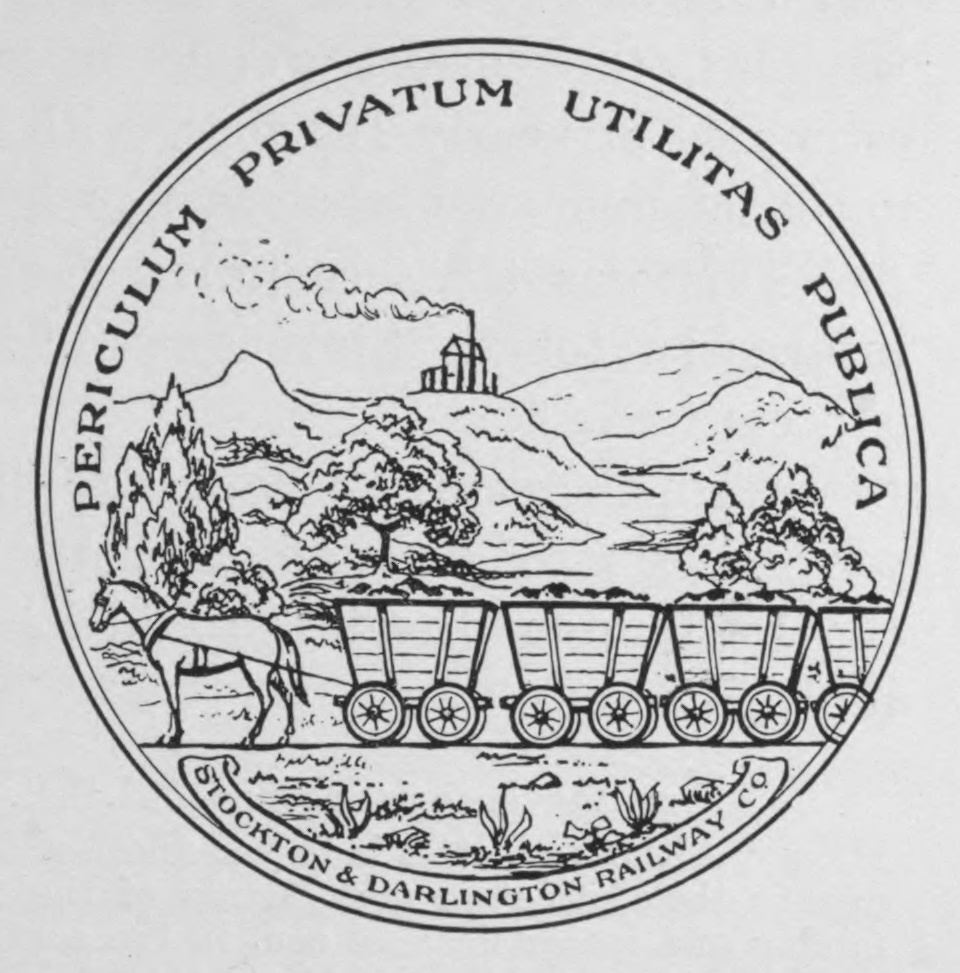
Seal of the Stockton & Darlington, the world's first commercially successful public railway. Its motto can be translated "private venture public benefit".

The building of public railways made it much easier to enter the coal industry.

The first railways were private lines built by individual collieries for the purpose of carrying their coals from pit-head to tideway. They required large investments, which was a barrier to entry into the seasale coal mining business. As one insider privately explained:

[Not having a railway] prevents the small coal owners opening their mines, and keeps the trade exclusively in the hands of the great Capitalists, whose profits are consequently much greater, and the Trade more easily regulated".

From 1818 a new concept emerged: the public railway, meaning that anyone could use it provided they paid the published charges. The first of these was the Stockton & Darlington, soon followed by the Clarence (above). The ethos of the S & D was that, while they intended to make a profit, they also meant to provide a public benefit for the local business community in general. Hence any mine, even a small one, could send its coals by public railway instead of having to build its own. The engineering cost of building a public railway was shared by numerous investors. They threatened the cartel's existence, however. Writing to Lord Durham about one such scheme, Henry Morton advised his employer:

I fear that it would open a great field of inferiour coal to the West of Durham where it lays at no great depth and wrought at little expence, and every person possessing one Hundred acres of Coal might easily make a winning, having the facility of a public Rail Way to carry away the coals — the Trade would by this means be put into too numerous a body that would render it impossible to carry on a regulation.

==== Right to cross neighbouring lands: Parliament intervenes ====
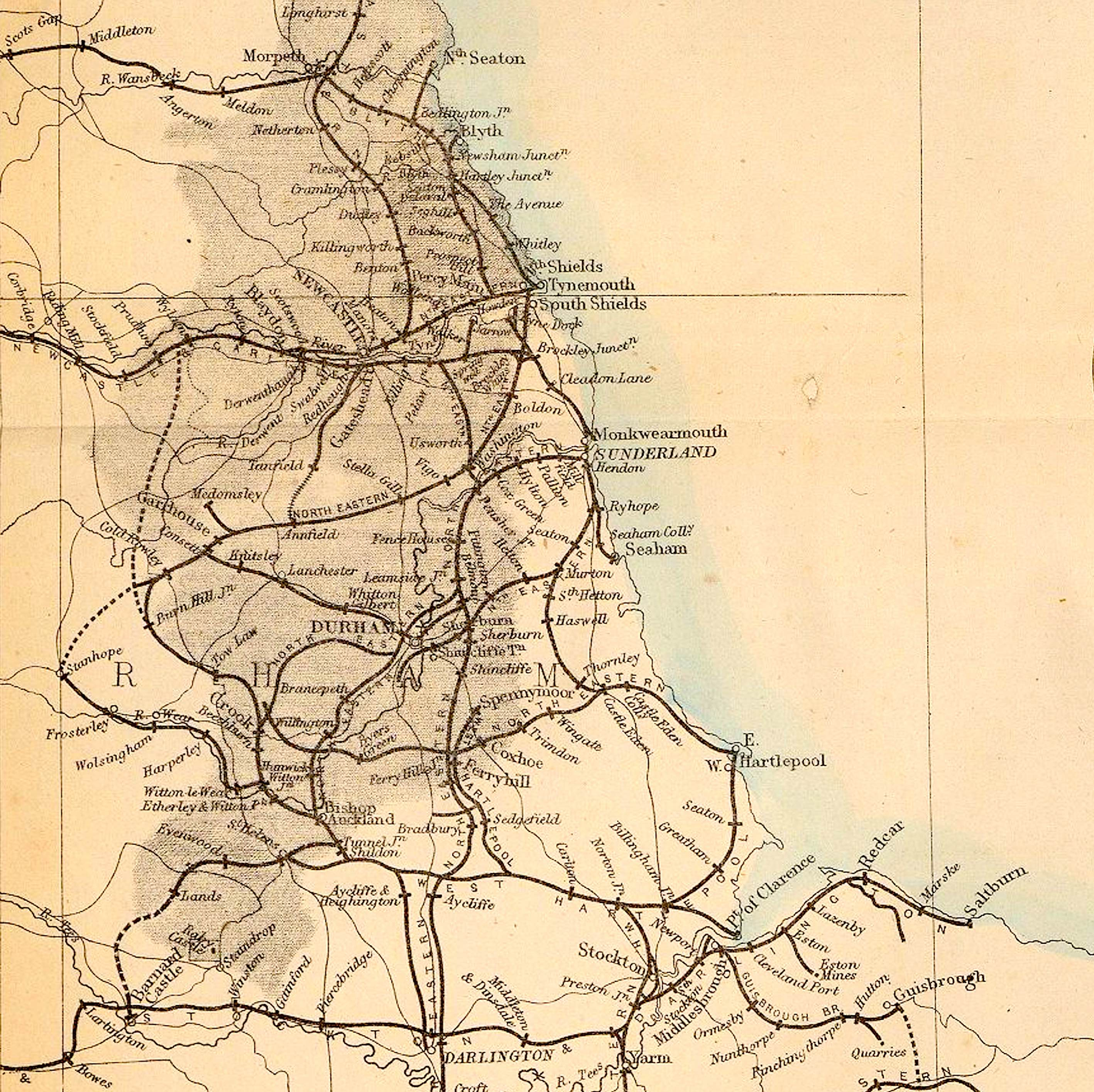
Public railways on the coalfield by 1860 (Edward Weller [detail], David Rumsey Historical Map Collection)

A significant part of the cost of a private railway was the wayleave rents. Wayleaves — permission to build a railway across one's neighbours' lands in order to get to tidal water — "could be the subject of bitter bargaining. It was not unknown for an owner to refuse a wayleave outright, if this meant denying an advantage to a competitor". (It was also not unknown for a wayleave to be got by a marriage alliance.) A landowner, if suitably rewarded, might agree to block all competitors ("negative wayleaves"). The opportunity to grant or refuse wayleaves, and to do it for money, was a valuable right, adding to the commercial value of one's property. There were cases where land valued at a few shillings a year for agricultural purposes earned many thousands of pounds in wayleave rents.

It has been estimated that, because of the wayleave charges, mines could seldom afford to build a line to the tideway more than four miles long, unless several shared the cost. Even Lord Londonderry, who hated cooperating with Lord Durham, shared private railway lines with him.

"The control of wayleaves", wrote coal historian Michael Flinn "was thus a powerful weapon in the hands of a group of coalowners anxious to create a restrictive or monopolistic agreement. Control of access to the riverside staithes was effectively control over entry to the coal shipping trade".

A few public railways did manage to negotiate wayleaves on reasonable terms, but most acquired them by compulsory purchase under powers granted to them by their Act of Parliament. When these Bills were debated in Parliament the Limitation of the Vend argued that landowners should have a right of veto. They repeatedly complained that they had had to pay for wayleaves for their private lines, so it would be unfair if their competitors were exempt. Parliament, however, having several times enquired into the Limitation, had decided to encourage competition (see above). The railways could buy land at reasonable prices.

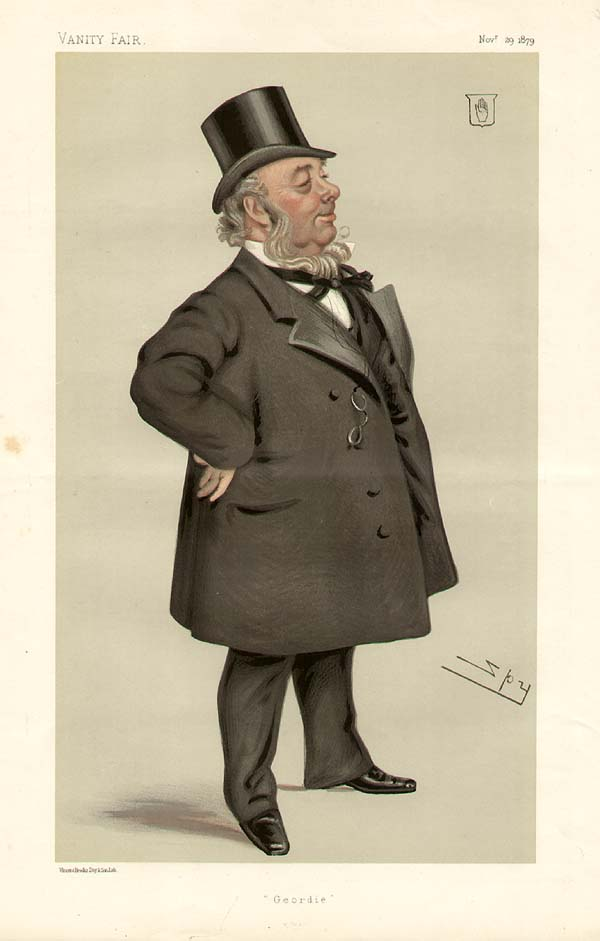
Sir George Elliot, 1st Baronet and former pit boy, caricature by Spy (Leslie Ward)

The Stockton & Darlington opened in 1825; the Clarence in 1833; by 1844 a further 18 lines were opened, mostly for the coal traffic.

As Sir George Elliot (a colliery labourer who went on to become a coal magnate, and was once coal viewer to Lord Londonderry) told Parliament,

the large coalowners used to have their own private railways and their private places of shipment, and they had the whole trade very much in their own hand; but after the system of railways was introduced, the difficulties of maintaining the monopoly and high prices became insurmountable.

=== Number of participants ===
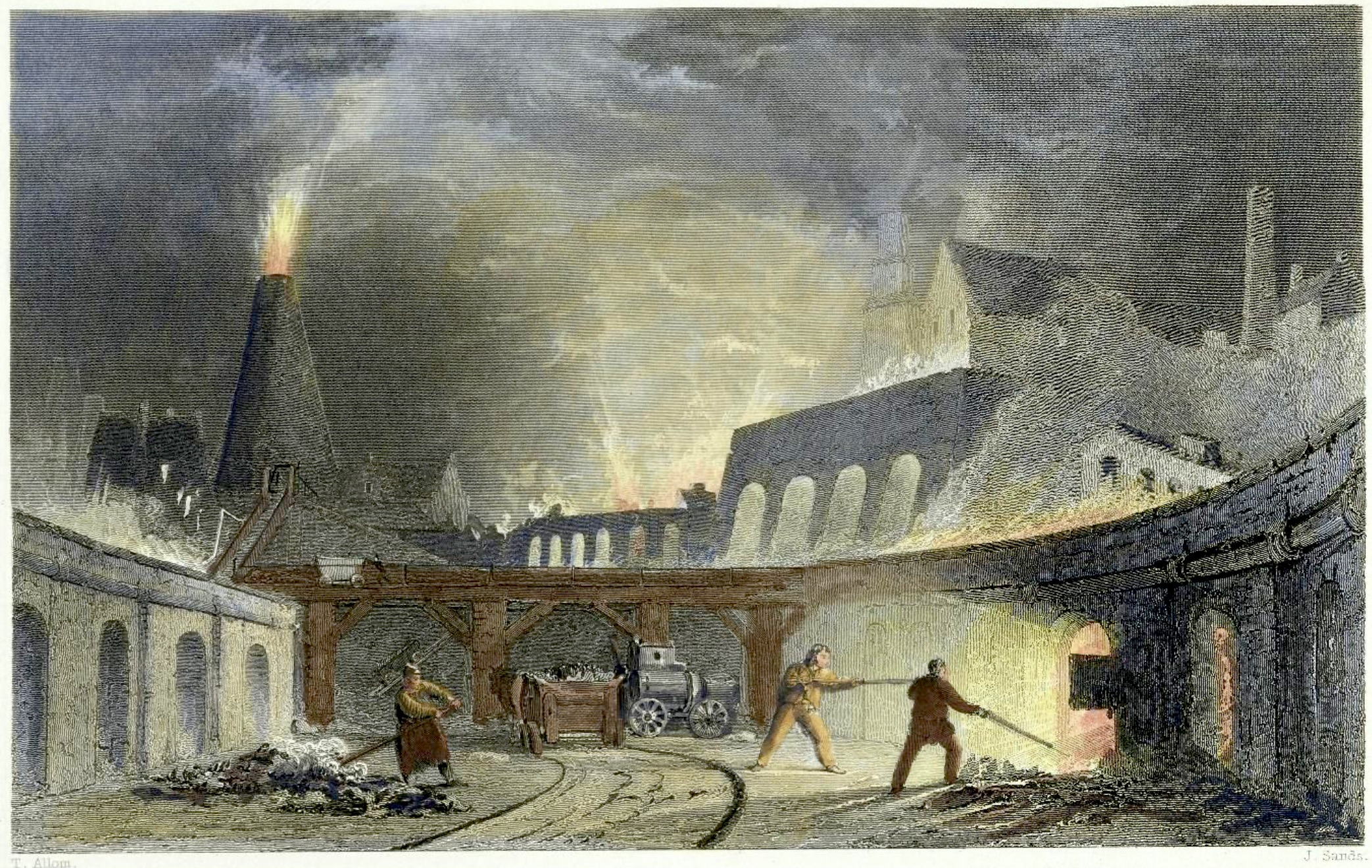
Local industrial demand for coal burgeoned; London was no longer the be all and end all. (Lymington Iron Works on the Tyne, 1835, Thomas Allom and James Sands, Science Museums Group).

According to Levy the following is likely a reliable estimate of the cartel's growth in its last years:

Number of mines in cartel
District	1830	1836	1844
Tyne	37	47	70
Wear	18	9	28
Tees	----	16	22
Hartley and Blyth	4	4	6
TOTAL	59	76	126

Of the large number of mines on the Tyne towards the end, most were second-rate collieries with small outputs and high production costs: they had proliferated because of the attractively high prices established by the cartel.

Matthias Dunn also blamed overoptimistic promotion of new mining companies and irresponsible bank lending:

The true causes of this overflowing supply, which rendered the regulation impracticable, may be set down to the extension of public railways into new districts, and the facility with which money was obtained from the Joint Stock Banks; hence, arose three great Coal Companies, whose object it was to lease and win coal fields in those districts, thus laid open. The flattering statements put forth by the projectors, upon those occasions, enlisted shareholders from all parts of the kingdom, the result of which, may be said to have been a total loss of the property embarked.

Parliament was told in June 1836 that, of the collieries on the three rivers, 12 were not in the cartel.

=== Mavericks ===
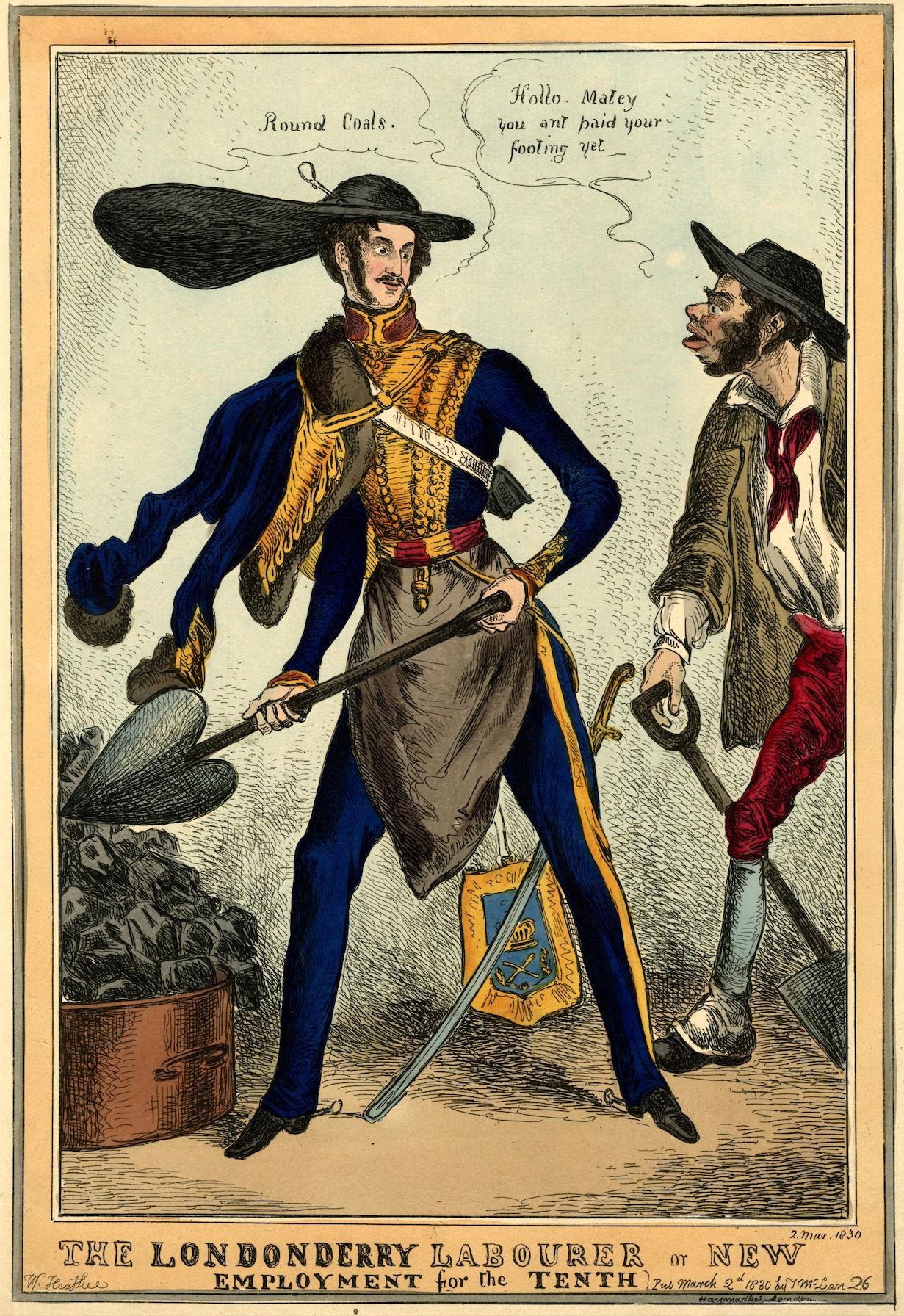
Satire in which a low coal-peddler reproaches Lord Londondery for not paying his fraternity dues (William Heath, 1830, British Museum)

As noted, the cartel in its later years had acquired not one noncomformist but three: Lord Londonderry, Lord Durham, and Arthur Mowbray of Hetton Coal, probably any one of whom could have broken the cartel if he wanted. Mowbray was alleged to have said: "T'Marquess, Lord Durham and t'Hetton Company might easily make t'regulation on't Wear themselves".

As time went by Londonderry and Durham found new markets for their coals; the chief economic rationale of the cartel — holding up prices in the London market — became decreasingly important to these men.

For many years scholars tended to treat Lord Londonderry as the chief offender in violating the cartel's regulations, his "unjustifiable breach of faith" leading to its final collapse. Later investigations have suggested that he was perhaps not worse than other major players.

==== Conciliator: loss of John Buddle ====
Towards the end, the cartel also lost a conciliator. The highly respected John Buddle had for years served as secretary to the Tyne Committee, and continued to attend meetings informally and without pay. For Buddle,

The true spirit and principle of a regulation is that it should benefit all classes, and make the whole trade move harmoniously, and beneficially, as if it belonged to one joint stock company.

He believed in the cartel as a matter of fairness (although, with the coming of public railways, he too began to lose faith). In October 1843 Buddle died. The cartel did not long survive him.

=== Conflict, defection, etc ===
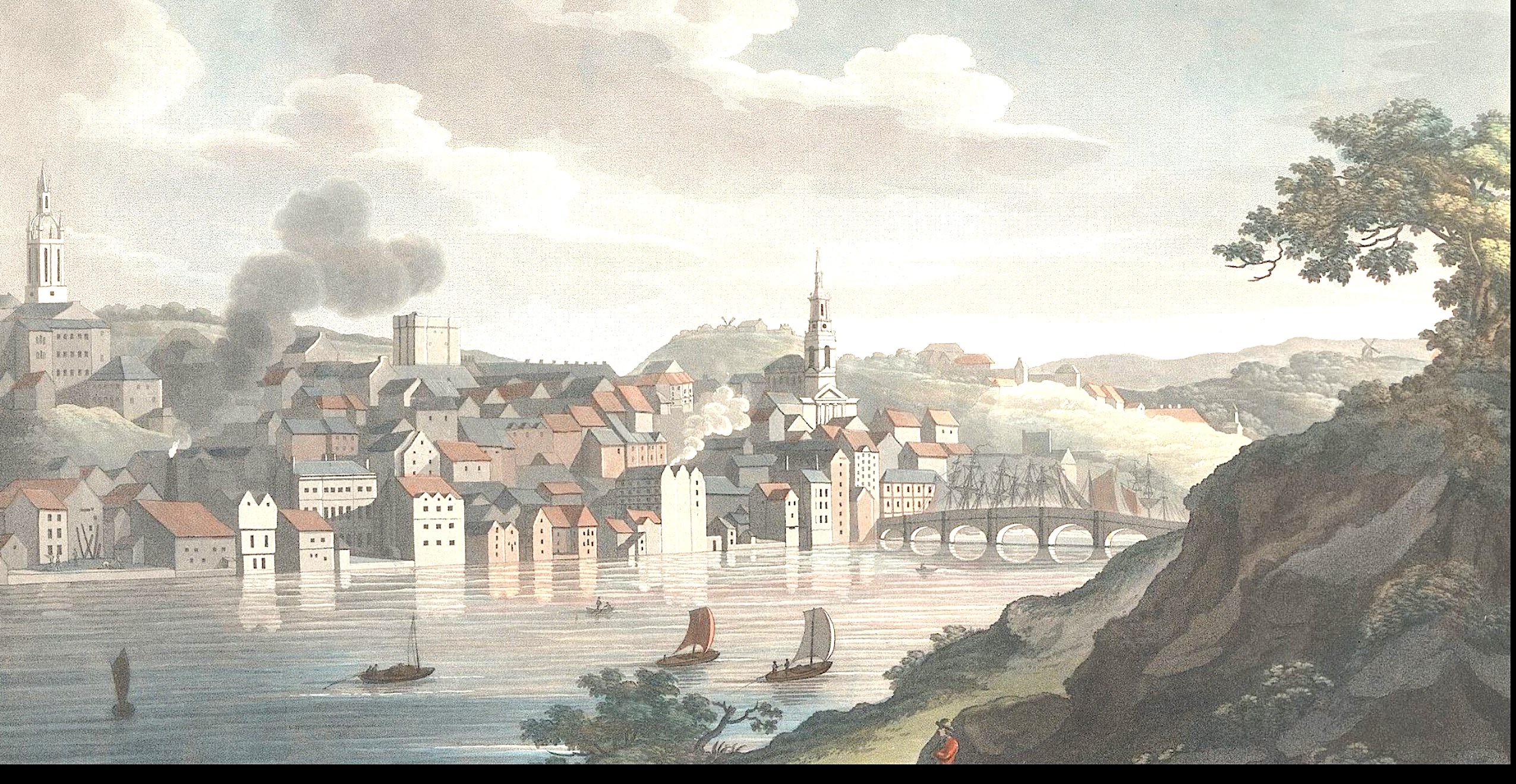
Many cartel mines — notably those above bridge — struggled with high operating costs. (Keelboats on the river Tyne, Charles Muss and Joseph Constantine Stadler, YCBA)

Also as noted, disputes in the cartel became more frequent and serious. Towards the end a few major players (in size and quality) dominated the river Tyne trade. There were nine of these collieries including the Wallsend, the Percy-Main (itself a disruptor) and the Willington. The inferior collieries who produced small quantities of second-class coal were far more numerous. On the Wear the three major players were Lords Londonderry and Durham and the Hetton Coal Company; they produced first-class coals suitable for London and second-class coals suitable for the coastal and local markets. Londonderry preferred quality and high prices, Durham large sales at low prices.

Hence the usual conflict of interest — between large producers of good coals who might have sold all they could produce, and the small second-class producers who wanted small vends at high prices — was particularly acute. "This complex dynamic of competition and collusion between firms of equal size and capacity and between firms of different scale was one of the most important factors in the history of the coal trade in the early nineteenth century". For Cambridge economist Austin Robinson:

In the end the conflict of interest was too great to be reconciled. The mechanical determination of the basis by reference to capacity was no longer workable. There was too much dead-wood of high-cost producers to be carried; if this could have been cut out by a period of open trade, bankruptcy and re-financing, the whole system might have recovered ... But it could only have held the low-cost producers by recognising (what had never been recognised) their title on that account to a higher basis.

As the cartel grew too large it became increasingly difficult to manage. There were complaints about the Basis. The committee were alleged to be remiss in enforcing the regulations. A number of members were found to have engaged in price-cutting.

=== Endgame ===
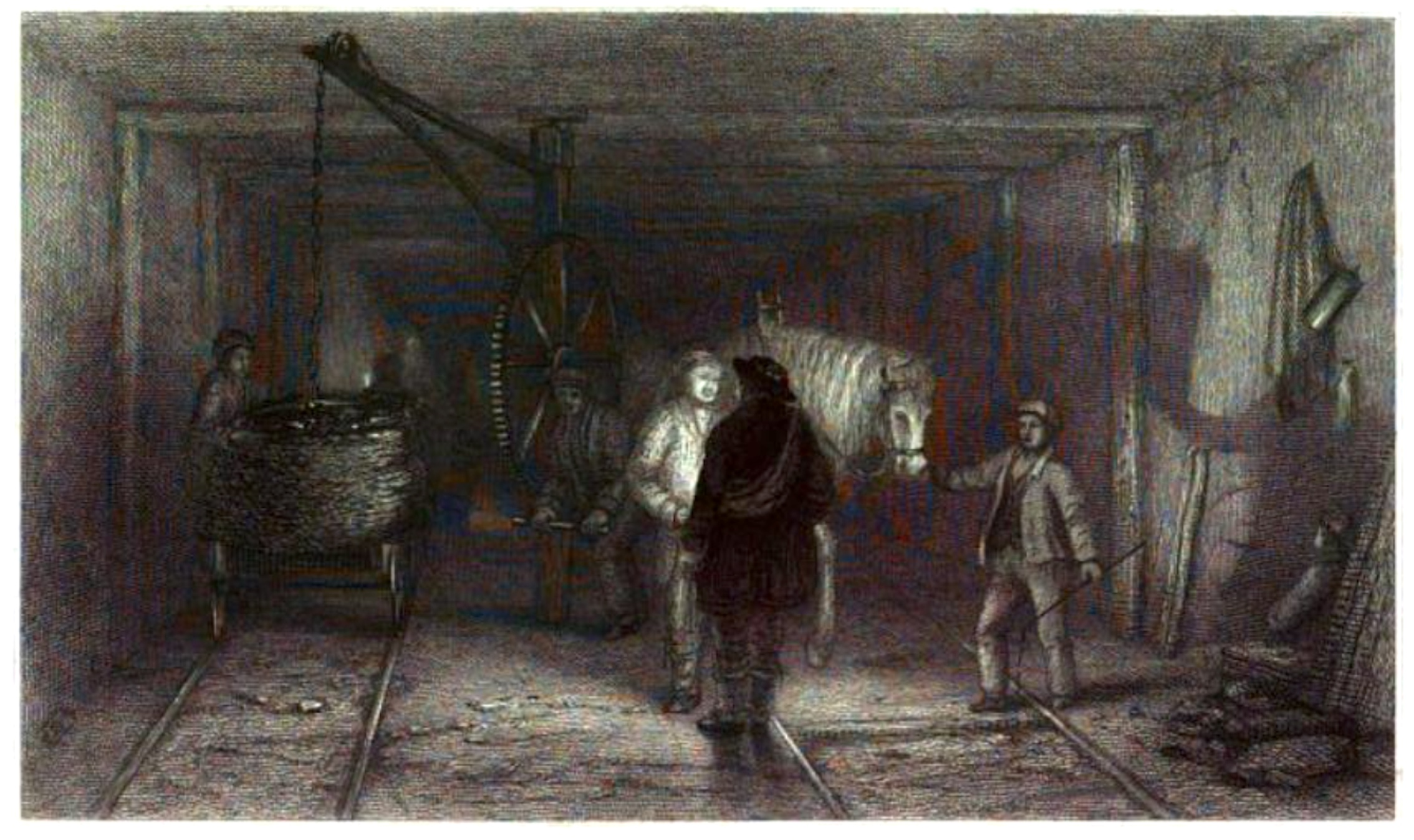
Pitmen at work, c. 1844 (T.H. Hair, Views). The 1844 miners' strike played havoc with the cartel's accounts.

A combination of circumstances put unbearable strain on the cartel.

In 1842 the government decided to restore the export duty on coal; the foreign demand fell away and members could no longer dump cheap coal in that market, which had been a safety valve.

In 1844 there was a year-long miners' strike. It affected mines variously. Some continued to work, greatly exceeding their quotas, while others fell far behind. When the Committee took stock in May 1845 they found an unprecedented accumulation of "overs" and "shorts", as follows:

Mines that exceeded quotas ("overs")
Rivers	Total tons over
Tyne, Hartley and Blyth	108,680
Wear	76,056
Tees	15,227
TOTAL	199,163

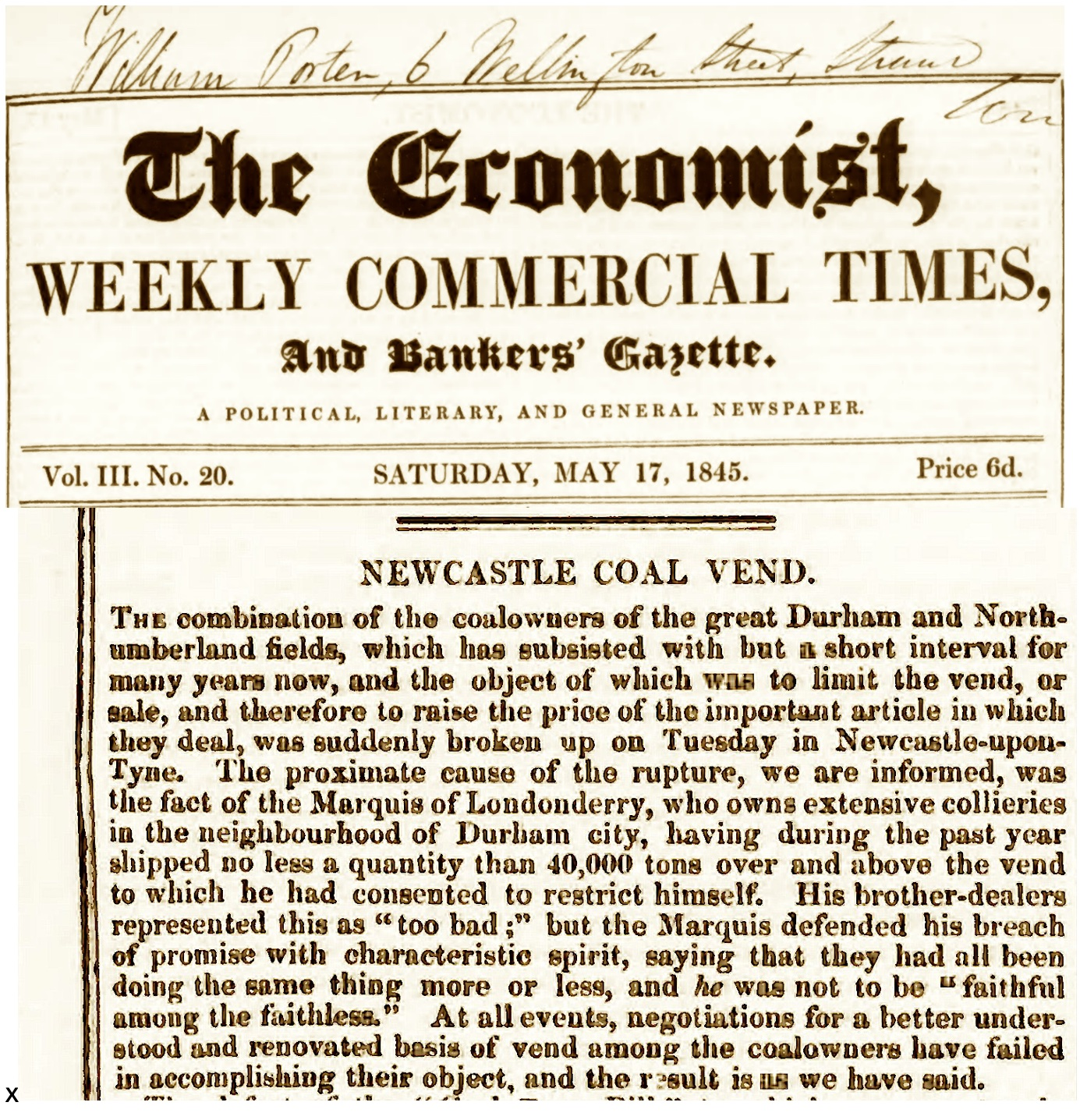
The end of the Limitation of the Vend (The Economist, 7 May 1845)

Mines that did not fulfil quotas ("shorts")
Rivers	Total tons short
Tyne, Hartley and Blyth	216,837
Wear	163,946
Tees	95,190
TOTAL	476,973

Lord Londonderry alone was 34,384 tons over. The accounts "are found not to be satisfactory to many parties", reported the Newcastle Journal.

According to the rules the quota-breakers were supposed to pay a fine of 5s a chaldron; the total came to £5.6 million expressed in present-day money. The Committee proposed to reduce the fines by a large and arbitrary amount Some big mines did not even reply to the committee's proposals, or returned vague or dissenting answers; the Committee singled out the Marquess of Londonderry for specific mention. No solution was found and the cartel was formally dissolved on 3 May 1845.

In the ensuing fighting trade Joseph Pease found that his coals would not pay the cost of freight; he gave away 10,000 tons which were used for mending the roads.

In the next ten years attempts were made to revive the Limitation, but they were not favoured by Lord Londonderry, and appear to have had no real success. In the 1850s large quantities of coal from the Midland, Lancashire and South Yorkshire coalfields began to arrive in London by rail. No longer could the seaborne trade control the market.

== Scholarly appraisal: how profitable was the cartel? ==
To what extent cartel members earned monopoly profits has been disputed by scholars.

=== Hermann Levy ===
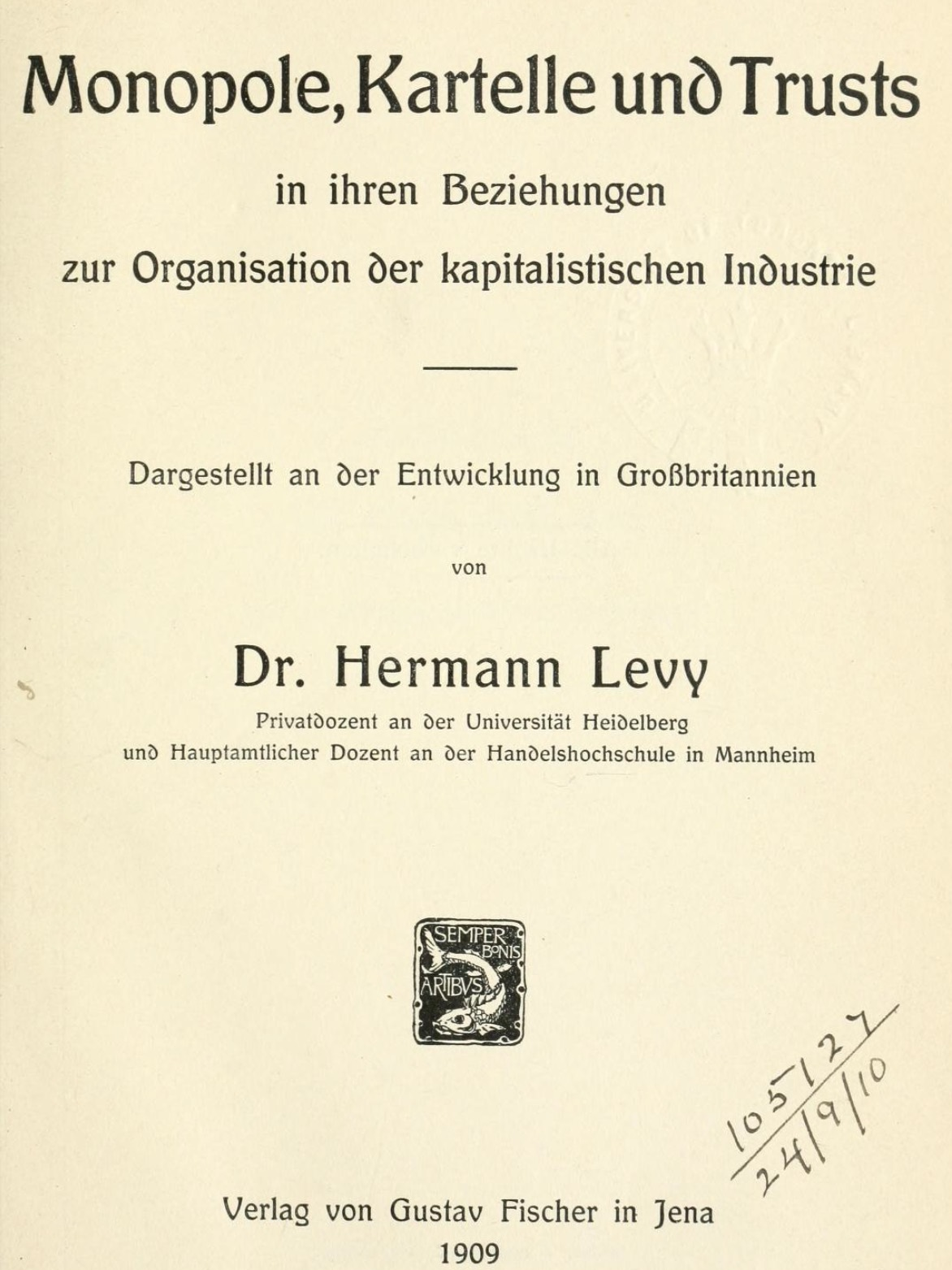
First German edition of Levy's book

Hermann Levy was professor of economics at Heidelberg University. In his Monopoly and Competition: A Study in English Industrial Organisation (1911) he wrote one of the first systematic accounts of the Limitation of the Vend; Sweezy called him "the accepted authority on the Limitation".

In Levy's view

An absolute monopoly the English coal cartel did not possess. But the fact remains that it was, up to a certain point, in a monopolist position; that is to say, so long as it did not screw up the price so high that it became profitable to get supplies from other sources. Up to that price limit (which was rather high) the northern colliers retained their monopoly in London. *** We cannot escape the conclusion that the tendency of this monopolist combination was to keep prices at the highest conceivable level, whatever the conditions of production might be.

=== Paul M. Sweezy ===
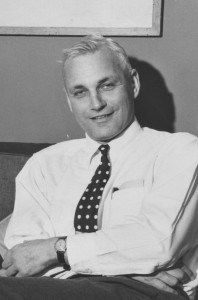
Paul Sweezy

In 1938 the Marxist economist and Harvard instructor Paul Sweezy published Monopoly and Competition in the English Coal Trade 1550–1860, which is about the north east coal cartel and still the only scholarly book devoted to the topic. Sweezy said his interest "was first aroused by a study of Marx's brilliant investigations into 'the law of motion of the capitalist system'", according to which "the larger capitals beat the smaller". Parliament had tolerated and then legitimised the Limitation of the Vend, "one more item to the already overwhelming mass of evidence which goes to prove the futility of expecting an effective anti-monopoly policy from a capitalist state". For Sweezy, governments were now sustaining the system by fostering monopoly capitalism or (in some countries) fascism. Sweezy predicted there would be another world war "which it is difficult to imagine that the capitalist system will survive". For some reason Sweezy never referred to this book again.

In an Appendix he estimated the success of the cartel by examining what happened when the regulation broke down. Although he did not quantify, he thought that the influence of the regulation "was of the first importance" in keeping up prices.

=== Michael Flinn ===
In The History of the British Coal Industry: 1700–1830, one of a five-volume series commissioned by the National Coal Board, the economic historian Michael Flinn wrote: "The behaviour of the prices themselves makes it difficult to adjudicate with any confidence between the competing claims of the producers that they really had very little control over prices, and those of consumers that they were being exploited by the price-rigging activities of the producers' combinations", and

their ability effectively to sustain artificially high prices, even in the highly concentrated London market, must remain in question.

=== William J. Hausman and Joel Mokyr ===
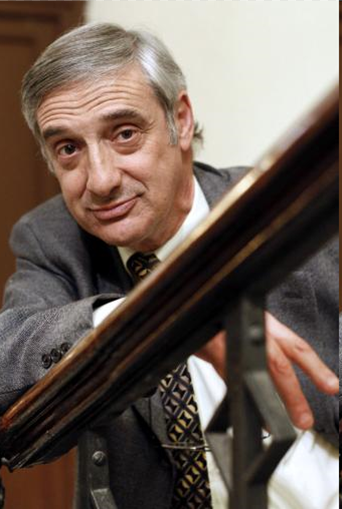
Joel Mokyr

Hausman, professor of economics at the College of William & Mary, published several papers about the Limitation of the Vend; they are referenced in this article. Unlike previous scholars, he sought to estimate the cartel's economic effect in quantitative terms. Hausman concluded that "The Limitation was capable, when fully operational, of raising the price of coal in London by a couple of shillings per chaldron at most"... It would be an overstatement to say that the Limitation was capable of raising the price of coal by 10 percent".

Joel Mokyr said "The heart of Hausman's paper is the estimation of a demand and supply system for London coal between 1770 and 1845... The test amounts to asking whether there was a big difference in prices and quantities in the years that the cartel was active... Hausman finds that the cartel succeeded in the narrow sense that the coefficient on the cartel variable is statistically significant, but failed in a wider sense since it raised prices only by 5-8 percent compared to 'competitive years'. The finding leads Hausman to conclude that the Limitation of the Vend was no OPEC".

Professor Mokyr thought Hausman's data showed the cartel was not able to operate like a true monopolist since there was always some substitute for north east coal: "it is possible that in the long run a more strict Limitation of the Vend would simply have led Londoners to buy their coal from Wales, or to wear warmer clothes in the winter".

=== Elaine S. Tan ===
Economic historian Elaine S. Tan (then of Royal Holloway, University of London) considered that the evaluations of Levy, Sweezy and Hausman had a methodological flaw: they were wrongly comparing prices when the cartel was restricting output with prices when it had collapsed. "Cartel prices in principle should be compared with the counterfactual of competitive prices". (For example, maybe the cartel broke down and prices were low because of the business cycle.) She calculated that "The Limitation, on average, raised prices by 13–17 per cent between 1816 and 1845". The cartel did have market power but it was modest because other coalfields stood ready to compete, given the chance.

=== Robert C Allen ===
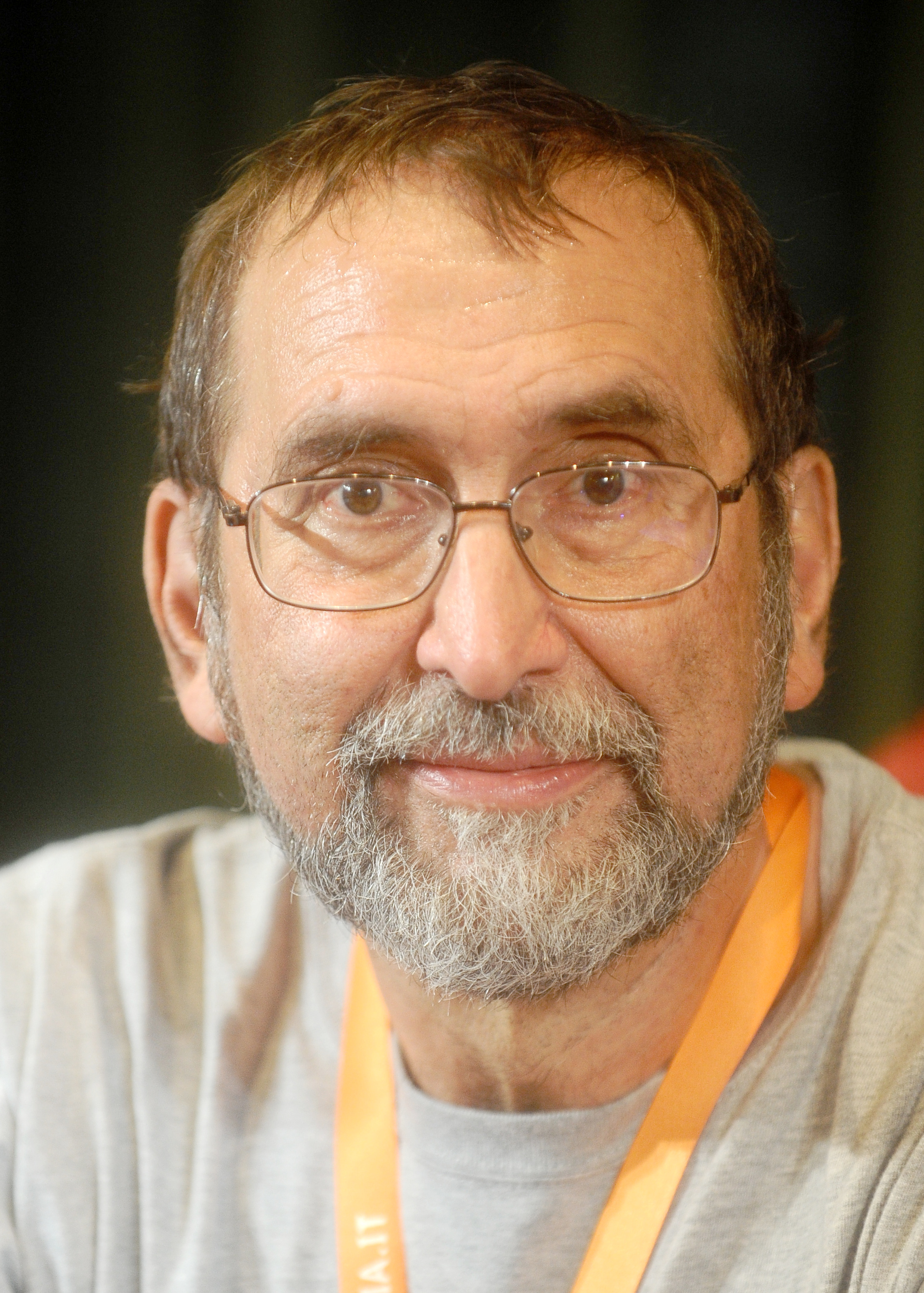
Bob Allen

In his 2023 paper Transportation Revolution and the English Coal Industry economic historian Bob Allen (then of New York University Abu Dhabi) established a network of English transport links (sea, river, canal and road) with historic coal prices at points on the network. From this he calculated transportation costs between points using geographical information systems (GIS) and regression analysis and asking "What level of shipping costs accounts for changes from place to place in the price of coal? He did this for the years 1695, 1795, and 1842.

In one part of his paper Allen used his results to compare the north east's seasale and landsale prices ("the price at the staiths for coal destined for London was higher than the price of land sales at the pithead"). On that basis he calculated that in 1795 the mines were making an extra 3.184 shillings a ton for coal sent to London compared to its local price, and an extra 8.54 shillings in 1842. It had been pointed out previously that landsale and seasale were different markets: generally, landsale collieries were shallower and less capitalised; they did not build railways to the staiths.

== Sources ==
=== General ===
- Allen, Robert C. (2013). Richard W. Unger (ed.). "Energy Transitions in History: The Shift to Coal" (PDF). Energy Transitions in History: Global Cases of Continuity and Change, RCC Perspectives 2013, No. 2, 11–15. (2): 11–16. JSTOR 26240489.
- Allen, Robert C. (2023). "The Transportation Revolution and the English Coal Industry, 1695–1842: A Geographical Approach". The Journal of Economic History. 83 (4): 1175–1220. doi:10.1017/S0022050723000402.
- Ansted, D.T. (1846). On the Methods of Working and Ventilating the Coal-Mines of the North of England. London: Taylor.
- Armstrong, John (1997). "Freight transport by rail and sea" (PDF). Journal of the Railway & Canal Historical Society. 32 Pt.4 (166).
- Armstrong, Sir W.G. (1863). "Presidential Address". A History of the Trade and Manufactures of the Tyne, Wear, and Tees: comprising papers read at the British Association for the Advancement of Science (2nd ed.). Newcastle-on-Tyne/London: Lambert/Spon. pp. 3–17.
- Ashton, Thomas Southcliff; Sykes, Joseph (1929). The Coal Industry of the Eighteenth Century. University of Manchester Press.
- Barke, Michael; Taylor, Peter J. (2015). "Newcastle's long nineteenth century". Urban History. 42 (1): 43–69. doi:10.1017/S0963926814000467. JSTOR 26398342.
- Barjot, Dominique; Schröter, Harm G. (2013). "General Introduction: Why a Special Edition on Cartels? / Introduction générale: Pourquoi un numéro spécial sur les cartels?". Revue économique. 64 (6, Economic Cooperation Reconsidered): 957–971, 973–988. doi:10.3917/reco.646.0957. JSTOR 42772280.
- Beaumont, Susan Laura (2019). Female Enterprise and Entrepreneurship in North East England, 1778-1801 (PDF) (Ph.D. thesis). Newcastle University.
- Beckett, J.W. (1986). "Elizabeth Montagu: Bluestocking Turned Landlady". Huntington Library Quarterly. 49 (2). University of Pennsylvania Press: 149–164. doi:10.2307/3817181. JSTOR 3817181.
- Bierig, Aleksandr (2023). "Restorations: Coal, Smoke, and Time in London, circa 1700". Journal18 (15 Cities).
- Bogart, D. (2013). "The Transportation Revolution in Industrializing Britain: A Survey". University of California-Irvine, Department of Economics Working Papers, (121306).
- Bowman, Don (1997). "The Rainton to Seaham Railway,1820–1840". Transactions of the Newcomen Society. 69 (1): 249–269. doi:10.1179/tns.1997.012.
- Brackenborough, Susie; McLean, Tom; Oldroyd, David (2001). "The Emergence of Discounted Cash Flow Analysis in the Tyneside Coal Industry c.1700–1820". British Accounting Review. 33 (2): 137–155. doi:10.1006/bare.2001.0158.
- Buddle, John (2013). Orde, Anne (ed.). Letters of John Buddle to Lord Londonderry, 1820-1843. Surtees Society. ISBN 978-0-85444-072-6.
- Burhop, Carsten; Lübbers, Thorsten (2009). "Cartels, Managerial Incentives, and Productive Efficiency in German Coal Mining, 1881- 1913". The Journal of Economic History. 69 (2): 500–527. doi:10.1017/S0022050709000862. JSTOR 40263965.
- Carrington, William James ("W.J.C.") (1875). Our Dwellings Warmed: As they are and as they might be: with a chapter on Ventilation. London: Lockwood.
- Cavert, William M. (2017). "The Environmental Policy of Charles I: Coal Smoke and the English Monarchy, 1624–40". Journal of British Studies. 53 (2): 310–333. doi:10.1017/jbr.2014.8.
- Clark, Gregory; Jacks, David (2007). "Coal and the Industrial Revolution, 1700-1869". European Review of Economic History. 11 (1): 39–72. doi:10.1017/S1361491606001870. JSTOR 41378456.
- Clavering, Eric (1995). "The Coal Mills of Northeast England: The Use of Waterwheels for Draining Coal Mines, 1600-1750". Technology and Culture. 36 (2): 211–241. doi:10.2307/3106371. JSTOR 3106371.
- Cohn, Gustav (1895). "Competition and Combination". The Economic Journal. 5 (20). Oxford University Press on behalf of the Royal Economic Society: 550–562. doi:10.2307/2956630. JSTOR 2956630.
- Connor, John M. (2014). "Cartel overcharges". The Law and Economics of Class Actions (Research in Law and Economics, Vol. 26). Vol. 26. Bingley: Emerald Group Publishing Limited. pp. 249–387. doi:10.1108/S0193-589520140000026008. ISBN 978-1-78350-951-5.
- Connor, John M. (2021). "Buyers' Cartels: Prevalence and Undercharges". pp. 1–10. SSRN 3883691.
- Craster, H.H.E (1907). A History of Northumberland. Vol. VIII The Parish of Tynemouth. Newcastle-upom-Tyne/London: The Northumberland County History Committee/Andrew Reid/Simpkin, Marshall, Hamilton, Kent.
- Cromar, Peter (1977). "The Coal Industry on Tyneside 1771-1800: Oligopoly and Spatial Change". Economic Geography. 53 (1): 79–94. doi:10.2307/142808. JSTOR 142808.
- Dale, Hylton B. (1922). "The Worshipful Company of the Woodmongers and the Coal Trade of London". Journal of the Royal Society of Arts. 70 (3648): 816–823. JSTOR 41355975.
- Dendy, F.W. (1901). "Introduction". Extracts from the Records of the Company of Hostmen of Newcastle-Upon-Tyne. Durham: Surtees Society.
- Dewey, Donald (1955). "The Common-Law Background of Antitrust Policy". Virginia Law Review. 41 (6): 759–786. doi:10.2307/1070212. JSTOR 1070212.
- Dunn, Matthias (1844). An Historical, Geological, and Descriptive View of the Coal Trade of the North of England. Newcastle upon Tyne: Pattison and Ross.
- Dunn, Matthias (1848). A treatise on the winning and working of collieries; including numerous statistics and remarks on ventilation, and illustrated by plans and engravings. To which are appended a glossary and an index. Newcastle-upon-Tyne: The author.
- Edwards, K.H. (1930). "Some Aspects of the Development of Tees-Side". Geography. 15 (8): 657–660. JSTOR 40559749.
- Estall, E.C. (1958). "The London Coal Trade". Geography. 43 (2): 75–85. JSTOR 40564161.
- Evans, Laurence (1988). "The Gift of the Sea: Civil Logistics and the Industrial Revolution". Historical Reflections / Réflexions Historiques. 15 (2): 361–415. JSTOR 23232419.
- Finch, Roger (1973). Coals from Newcastle. Lavenham: Terence Dalton. ISBN 0900963395.
- Fine, Ben (2013) [orig. pub. 1990]. The Coal Question: Political Economy and Industrial Change from the Nineteenth Century to the Present Day. Oxford and New York: Routledge Revivals. ISBN 978-0-203-78407-5.
- Flinn, Michael W.; Stoker, David (1984). The History of the British Coal Trade: 1700-1850. Vol. 2. Oxford: Clarendon Press. ISBN 0-19-828283-4.
- Galloway, Robert L. (1898). Annals of Coal Mining and the Coal Trade. London: Colliery Guardian.
- Galloway, James A.; Keene, Derek; Murphy, Margaret (1996). "Fuelling the City: Production and Distribution of Firewood and Fuel in London's Region, 1290-1400". The Economic History Review. 49 (3): 447–472. JSTOR 2597759.
- Hair, T.H.; Ross, M. (1844). A Series of Views of the Collieries of Northumberland and Durham. London: James Madden.
- Hall, T.Y. (1854). "The Extent and Probable Duration of the Northern Coal-Field". Transactions of the North of England Institute of Mining Engineers. 2. Newcastle-upon-Tyne: 104–236.
- Hanlon, W. Walker (2020). "Coal Smoke, City Growth, and the Costs of the Industrial Revolution". The Economic Journal. 130 (626): 462–488. doi:10.1093/ej/uez055.
- Hardwick, F.W.; O'Shea, L.T. (1916). "The History of the Safety-Lamp". Journal of the Royal Society of Arts. 64 (3323): 640–645. JSTOR 41346995.
- Harrison, Thomas Elliot (1859). "On the Tyne Docks at South Shields; and the mode adopted for Shipping Coals" (PDF). Minutes of Proceedings of the Institution of Civil Engineers. 18: 490–503, 504–524 and Plate VIII. doi:10.1680/imotp.1859.23693.
- Hausman, William J. (1977a). "Size and Profitability of English Colliers in the Eighteenth Century". The Business History Review. 51 (4): 460–473. doi:10.2307/3112880. JSTOR 3112880. S2CID 154377002.
- Hausman, William J. (1977b). "Public Policy and the Supply of Coal to London, 1700-1770: A Summary". The Journal of Economic History. 37 (1): 252–254. doi:10.1017/S0022050700112069. JSTOR 2119462.
- Hausman, William J. (1980). "A Model of the London Coal Trade in the Eighteenth Century". The Quarterly Journal of Economics. 94 (1): 1–14. doi:10.2307/1884601. JSTOR 1884601.
- Hausman, William J. (1984a). "Market Power in the London Coal Trade: The Limitation of the Vend, 1770-1845". Explorations in Economic History. 21 (4): 383–405. doi:10.1016/0014-4983(84)90003-2.
- Hausman, William J. (1984b). "Cheap Coals or Limitation of the Vend? The London Coal Trade, 1770-1845". The Journal of Economic History. 44 (2, The Tasks of Economic History): 321–328. doi:10.1017/S0022050700031922. JSTOR 2120709.
- Heesom, A. J. (1980). "The Northern Coal-Owners and the Opposition to the Coal Mines Act of 1842" (PDF). International Review of Social History. 25 (2): 236–271. doi:10.1017/S0020859000006301.
- Hewitt, F.S (1960). The papers of John Buddle, colliery viewer, in the mining institute, Newcastle on Tyne: an annotated list of assessment of their value to the economic historian (PDF) (M.A. thesis). Durham University.
- Hill, Christopher (1993). "Review: The Making of an Industrial Society: Whickham, 1560-1765 by David Levine and Keith Wrightson". Journal of British Studies. 32 (1): 76–83. doi:10.1086/386022. JSTOR 176021.
- Hiskey, Christine E. (1978). John Buddle (1773 - 1843) agent and entrepreneur in the north-east coal trade (MLitt). Durham University.
- Hiskey, Christine E. (1983). "The Third Marquess of Londonderry and the Regulation of the Coal Trade: the Case Re-opened". Durham University Journal. LXXV (2): 1–9.
- Jaffe, J.A (1989). "Competition and the Size of Firms in the North-East Coal Trade, 1800–1850". Northern History. 25 (1): 235–255. doi:10.1179/nhi.1989.25.1.235.
- Jaffe, James A. (1991). The Struggle for Market Power: Industrial Relations in the British Coal Industry, 1800-1840. Cambridge University Press. ISBN 0-521-39146-6.
- Jars, Gabriel (1774). Voyages Métallurgiques (in French). Lyon: Gabriel Regnault.
- Jeans, J. Stephen (1894). "The limitation of the 'vend' in the North of England coal trade". Trusts Pools and Corners as Affecting Industry: an Inquiry into the Principles and Recent Operation into Combinations and Syndicates to Limit Production and Increase Prices. London: Methuen.
- Jevons, W. Stanley (1866). The Coal Question: An Inquiry Concerning the Progress of the Nation and the Probable Exhaustion of Our Coal Mines (2nd ed.). London: Macmillan.
- Kanefsky, John; Robey, John (1980). "Steam Engines in 18th-Century Britain: A Quantitative Assessment". Technology and Culture. 21 (2): 161–186. doi:10.2307/3103337. JSTOR 3103337.
- Kimmel, Sheldon (2011). "How and Why the Per Se Rule Against Price-Fixing Went Wrong". Supreme Court Economic Review. 19: 245–270. doi:10.1086/664566. JSTOR 10.1086/664566.
- Kirby, M.W. (1973). "The Control of Competition in the British Coal-Mining Industry in the Thirties". The Economic History Review. 26 (2): 273–284. doi:10.2307/2594253. JSTOR 2594253.
- Kirby, Maurice W. (1993). The Origins of Railway Enterprise: The Stockton and Darlington Railway, 1821-1863. Cambridge. ISBN 0 521 38445-1.
- Lee, Charles (1945). "The World's Oldest Railway". Transactions of the Newcomen Society. 25 (1): 141–162. doi:10.1179/tns.1945.016.
- Lee, Robert (2007). The Church of England and the Durham Coalfield, 1810-1926: Clergymen, Capitalists and Colliers. Woodbridge: Boydell Press. ISBN 9781843833475.
- Letwin, William L. (2013). "The English common law concerning monopolies". Contract — Freedom and Restraint. Routledge. ISBN 9781315053851.
- Levenstein, Margaret C.; Suslow, Valerie Y. (2006). "What Determines Cartel Success?". Journal of Economic Literature. 44 (1): 43–95. doi:10.1257/002205106776162681. hdl:2027.42/35837. JSTOR 30032296.
- Levy, Hermann (1911). Monopoly and Competition: A Study in English Industrial Organisation. London: Macmillan.
- Lloyd, E.M.; Heesom, A.J. (2011). "Vane [formerly Stewart], Charles William, third marquess of Londonderry (1778–1854)". Oxford Dictionary of National Biography. Oxford Dictionary of National Biography (online ed.). OUP. doi:10.1093/ref:odnb/26467. (Subscription, Wikipedia Library access or UK public library membership required.)
- Luckin, Bill; Thorsheim, Peter (2020). "Environment and Daily Life in London, 1800–2000". In Luckin, Bill; Thorsheim, Peter (eds.). A Mighty Capital Under Threat: The Environmental History of London, 1800–2000. University of Pittsburgh Press. ISBN 978-0822946106.
- Martin, Ged (2004). "Lambton, John George [nicknamed Radical Jack], first earl of Durham (1792–1840)". Oxford Dictionary of National Biography. Oxford Dictionary of National Biography (online ed.). OUP. doi:10.1093/ref:odnb/15947. (Subscription, Wikipedia Library access or UK public library membership required.)
- Mayhew, Henry (1861). London Labour and the London Poor. Vol. III. London: Griffin, Bohn.
- McCord, N.; Rowe, D.J. (1977). "Industrialisation and Urban Growth in North-East England". International Review of Social History. 22 (1): 30–64. doi:10.1017/S0020859000005411. JSTOR 44581764.
- Mokyr, Joel (1984). "Discussion of Hoffman and Hausman Papers". The Journal of Economic History. 44 (2, The Tasks of Economic History): 341–343. doi:10.1017/S0022050700031946. JSTOR 2120711.
- Munby, D. L. (1959). "Investing in Coal". Oxford Economic Papers. 11 (3): 242–269. doi:10.1093/oxfordjournals.oep.a040826. JSTOR 2661908.
- Nef, J.U. (1932a). The Rise of the British Coal Industry. Vol. 1. London: Routledge.
- Nef, J.U. (1932b). The Rise of the British Coal Industry. Vol. 2. London: Frank Cass.
- Orde, Anne (2013). "Introduction". Letters of John Buddle to Lord Londonderry, 1820-1843. Surtees Society. ISBN 978-0-85444-072-6.
- Pollard, Sidney (1980). "A New Estimate of British Coal Production, 1750-1850". The Economic History Review. 33 (2): 212–235. doi:10.2307/2595840. JSTOR 2595840.
- Porter, G.R. (1843). The Progress of the Nation. Vol. Sections V. to VIII. London: Charles Knight.
- Rennison, Robert W. (2004). "The Civil Engineering History of Four Coal-Shipping Ports in North East England, 1717–1821". Transactions of the Newcomen Society. 74 (2): 249–279. doi:10.1179/tns.2004.015.
- Reynolds, K.D. (2004). "Vane, Frances Anne, marchioness of Londonderry (1800–1865)". Oxford Dictionary of National Biography (online ed.). OUP.
- Robinson, Austin (1941). "Review: Monopoly and Competition in the English Coal Trade, 1550-1850 by P. M. Sweezy". The Economic Journal. 51 (201): 101–105. doi:10.2307/2225651. JSTOR 2225651.
- Rowe, D.J. (1968). "The Strikes of The Tyneside Keelmen in 1809 and 1819". International Review of Social History. 13 (1): 58–75. doi:10.1017/S0020859000000432. JSTOR 44581606.
- Schmitt, Hans A. (1964). "The European Coal and Steel Community: Operations of the First European Antitrust Law, 1952-1958". The Business History Review. 38 (1, International Government-Business Issue): 102–122. doi:10.2307/3112489. JSTOR 3112489.
- Scott, J.R. (1869). An Epitome of the Progress in the Trade in Coal to London since 1775. London: Scott/Nissen Parker Arnold.
- Sill, Michael (1982). East Durham: mining colonisation and the genesis of the colliery landscape, 1770-1851 (PhD). Vol. 1. Durham University.
- Sill, M. (1984). "Landownership and Industry: The East Durham Coalfield in the Nineteenth Century". Northern History. 20 (1): 146–166. doi:10.1179/nhi.1984.20.1.146.
- Smailes, Arthur E. (1935). "The development of the Northumberland and Durham coalfield". Scottish Geographical Magazine. 51 (4): 201–214. doi:10.1080/14702543508554344.
- Smailes, Arthur E. (1938). "Population Changes in the Colliery Districts of Northumberland and Durham". The Geographical Journal. 91 (3): 220–229. Bibcode:1938GeogJ..91..220S. doi:10.2307/1787541. JSTOR 1787541.
- Smith, Raymond (1961). Sea Coal for London: History of the Coal Factors in the London Market. London: Longmans, Green.
- Solar, Peter M.; Dunn, Oliver Buxton; Kane, Aidan (2024). "Shipping in the London coal trade, 1700-1860". The Economic History Review. 77 (3): 1005–1034. doi:10.1111/ehr.13296.
- Spring, David (1960). "Review: The Life and Times of Frances Anne Marchioness of Londonderry and Her Husband Charles Third Marquess of Londonderry by Edith, Marchioness of Londonderry". The Journal of Modern History. 32 (1): 75–76. doi:10.1086/238419. JSTOR 1871869.
- Sturgess, R.W. (1975). An Aristocrat in Business: the Third Marquess of Londonderry as Coalowner and Portbuilder. Durham: Durham County Local History Society. ISBN 0-902958-02-X.
- Sweezy, Paul M. (1938). Monopoly and Competition in the English Coal Trade 1550-1850. Cambridge: Harvard University Press.
- Tan, Elaine S. (2009). "Market Structure and the Coal Cartel in Early Nineteenth-Century England". The Economic History Review. 62 N.S. (2): 350–365. doi:10.1111/j.1468-0289.2008.00441.x. JSTOR 20542915.
- Tann, Jennifer (1992). "The Steam Engine on Tyneside in the Industrial Revolution". Transactions of the Newcomen Society. 64 (1): 53–75. doi:10.1179/tns.1992.004.
- Taylor, A.J. (1953). "Combination in the Mid-Nineteenth Century Coal Industry". Transactions of the Royal Historical Society. 3: 23–39. doi:10.2307/3678707. JSTOR 3678707.
- Thomas, D.A. (1903). "The Growth and Direction of Our Foreign Trade in Coal During the Last Half Century". Journal of the Royal Statistical Society. 66 (3): 439–533. doi:10.2307/2339411. JSTOR 2339411.
- Thompson, Benjamin (1847). Inventions, Improvements and Practice. Newcastle: M. and M.W. Lambert.
- Tomlinson, Wiliam Weaver (1915). The North Eastern Railway: Its Rise and Development. Newcastle-upon-Tyne; London: Andrew Reid; Longmans, Green.
- Turnbull, Gerard (1987). "Canals, Coal and Regional Growth during the Industrial Revolution". The Economic History Review. 40 (4): 537–560. doi:10.2307/2596392. JSTOR 2596392.
- Turnbull, Les (2018). "Elizabeth Montagu". Huntington Library Quarterly. 81 (4, "The Commerce of Life": Elizabeth Montagu (1718–1800)): 657–686. doi:10.1353/hlq.2018.0023. JSTOR 26661609.
- Uekötter, Frank (2023). "London Smog In the Age of Coal". The Vortex: An Environmental History of the Modern World. University of Pittsburgh Press. pp. 245–257. doi:10.2307/jj.17207102.24. JSTOR jj.17207102.24.
- Velkar, Aashish (2008). "Caveat Emptor: Abolishing Public Measurements, Standardizing Quantities, and Enhancing Market Transparency in the London Coal Trade c1830". Enterprise & Society. 9 (2): 281–313. doi:10.1093/es/khn003. JSTOR 23701369.
- Ville, Simon (1984a). "Note: Size and Profitability of English Colliers in the Eighteenth Century: A Reappraisal". The Business History Review. 58 (1, Transportation): 103–120. doi:10.2307/3114530. JSTOR 3114530.
- Ville, Simon (1984b). "Review:The History of the British Coal Industry. Volume 2. 1700-1830: The Industrial Revolution by Michael W. Flinn and David Stoker". The Business History Review. 58 (4): 637–638. doi:10.2307/3114195. JSTOR 3114195.
- Ville, Simon (1986). "Total Factor Productivity in the English Shipping Industry: The North-East Coal Trade, 1700-1850". The Economic History Review. 39 (3): 355–370. doi:10.2307/2596345. JSTOR 2596345.
- Ville, Simon (1990). "Shipping in the Port of Sunderland 1815–45: A Counter-Cyclical Trend". Business History. 32 (1): 32–51. doi:10.1080/00076799000000003.
- Virtue, G. O. (1896). "The Anthracite Combinations". The Quarterly Journal of Economics. 10 (3): 296–323. doi:10.2307/1882587. JSTOR 1882587.
- von Oeynhausen, C.; von Dechen (1971). Charles E. Lee; K. R. Gilbert (eds.). Railways in England 1826 and 1827: Observations collected during a journey in the years 1826 and 1827. Translated by E. A. Forward. Cambridge: The Newcomen Society. ISBN 0-85270-048-2.
- Walker, Francis (1904). "Monopolistic Combinations in the German Coal Industry". Publications of the American Economic Association. Third Series. 5 (3): 5–334 (461–790). JSTOR 2999957.
- Wood, Nicholas (1858). "On the improvements and progress in the working and ventilation of coal mines in the Newcastle-on-Tyne district within the last fifty years". Proceedings of the Institution of Mechanical Engineers: 177–236.
- Wood, Nicholas; Taylor, John; Marley, John; Pease, J.W. (1863). "On Coal, Coke and Coal Mining". A History of the Trade and Manufactures of the Tyne, Wear, and Tees: comprising papers read at the British Association for the Advancement of Science (2nd ed.). Newcastle-on-Tyne/London: Lambert/Spon. pp. 18–46.
- Wrigley, E.A. (1962). "The Supply of Raw Materials in the Industrial Revolution". The Economic History Review. XV (1, 2nd ser): 1–16. doi:10.2307/2593286. JSTOR 2593286.
- Wrigley, E.A. (2013). "Energy and the English Industrial Revolution". Phil Trans R Soc A. 371 (20110568): 1–10. Bibcode:2013RSPTA.37110568W. doi:10.1098/rsta.2011.0568. PMID 23359739.
- Wrigley, E.A. (2014). "Urban Growth in Early Modern England: Food, Fuel and Transport". Past & Present (225): 79–112. doi:10.1093/pastj/gtu032. JSTOR 24545164.

=== Parliamentary reports ===
- House of Commons (June 1800) (1803a). "Report from the Committee appointed to consider of the Coal Trade of this Kingdom". Reports from Committees of the House of Commons: Re-printed by Order of the House. Vol. X (Miscellaneous Subjects 1785-1801). House of Commons.
- House of Commons (December 1800) (1803b). "Report from the Committee appointed to consider of the Coal Trade of this Kingdom". Reports from Committees of the House of Commons: Re-printed by Order of the House. Vol. X (Miscellaneous Subjects 1785-1801. House of Commons.
- House of Lords (1829). The evidence taken before the select committee of the House of Lords, appointed to take into consideration the state of the Coal Trade in the United Kingdom. Newcastle upon Tyne: John Sykes, bookseller. [Evidence taken in 1829 session.]
- House of Lords (1830). Report from the Select Committee of the House of Lords appointed to take into consideration the state of the coal trade in the United Kingdom, with the minutes of evidence, appendix and index. London: House of Lords.
- House of Commons (1836). "Report from the Select Committee on the state of the coal trade together with the minutes of evidence and appendix". Report : together with the minutes of evidence, and appendix ordered by the House of Commons, to be printed, 2 August 1836. London: House of Commons.
- House of Commons (1838). "Parliamentary Papers". Report from Select Committee on the Coal Trade (Port of London) Bill with the minutes of evidence, appendix and i. London: House of Commons.

=== Legislation ===
- An act to dissolve the present, and prevent the future combination of coal-owners, lightermen, masters of ships, and others, to advance the price of coals, in prejudice of the navigation, trade, and manufactures of this kingdom, and for the further encouragement of the coal-trade (Public General Act 9 Anne c.28). Parliament of the United Kingdom. 1710.
- An Act to repeal an Act of the Iwenty fifth Year of His present Majesty, for better securing the Duties on Coals, Culm and Cinders; and making other Provisions in lieu thereof; and for requiring Ships in the Coal Trade to be measured (Public General Act 52 George III c.9). Parliament of the United Kingdom. 1812.
- Newcastle-Upon-Tyne Coal Turn Act (Local Act 8 & 9 Vict. c.93). Parliament of the United Kingdom. 1845.

=== Newspapers ===
- "The Coal Trade Regulations". Newcastle Journal. 17 May 1845. p. 2.

=== Tools ===
- Bank of England. "Inflation Calculator".

(In this article, where historic prices have been expressed in current purchasing power, they have been calculated with this tool.)
