= Matthias Dunn =

Matthias Dunn (bap. 1788, d. 1869) was a British mining engineer and one of the first government inspectors of mines. He was known for encouraging safe practices in mines.

== Early life ==
Dunn was baptized at St Joseph's Roman Catholic Church, Birtley, County Durham, on 10 December 1788, the son of Robert Dunn (c.1755–1822) and his second wife, Agatha (Agnes), possibly née Hunter (d. 1790). His father was a viewer at Lumley colliery near Chester-le-Street.

== Mining career ==
In 1804, Matthias Dunn was apprenticed to Thomas Smith, colliery viewer of Lambton Colliery, Durham. In 1810 he was appointed assistant viewer at Hebburn Colliery, also in Durham, under the supervision of John Buddle, where he oversaw the day-to-day running of the colliery. It was common then for viewers to do consultative or surveying work at collieries other than those to which they were contracted so Dunn gained further experience by accompanying Buddle on visits to some of the other collieries with which he was involved. In 1813 Dunn became resident viewer at Hebburn.

His concern for mine safety was enhanced from his experience retrieving the bodies of the 75 victims of the flooding of Heaton colliery in 1815 and later observing that the explosion at Harraton Row pit in 1817 where over 40 people lost their lives was due to a hewer who refused to use a safety lamp. (Dunn and the Rev. John Hodgson had tested the first Davy safety lamp at Hebburn Colliery in January 1816.)

Dunn might have expected to inherit shares in the collieries owned by his family and be manager there, but the will of his Uncle Matthias who died in 1825 did not provide for this, perhaps because Dunn wanted to be able to continue his freelance work. Thus for the next 20 years or so he worked at many collieries in Britain and some in Europe.

He leased and became a partner in several collieries including Stargate near Ryton, Co. Durham and Prestongrange, East Lothian,(now the site of the Prestongrange Industrial Heritage Museum) where, in 1830, he sank the first deep shaft in Scotland using Buddle's cast-iron tubbing to line the shaft. This was a first use in Scotland as it was later by him in Ireland at one of the Castle Comer pits in Kilkenny. The Society for the Encouragement of the Useful Arts in Scotland subsequently awarded Dunn its first honorary medal for his work at Prestongrange.

In 1831, Dunn was appointed viewer by the Hetton Coal Company, Durham, but he still had freelance work, which led to tensions with management. His apparent lenient handling of striking miners at the colliery in 1832 further strained relationships, especially as he disagreed with the treatment of the men by John Wood the underviewer and he was dismissed at the end of 1832.

He also spent time at Workington and visited collieries in Belgium.

As viewer of the St Lawrence Main and Shield Field collieries, he gave evidence on child labour to the Children's Employment Commission that reported in 1842.

== Safety promotion ==
Throughout his career Dunn demonstrated a profound concern for mine safety and was particularly interested in improvements to mine ventilation and flood prevention. He was a prolific author producing books, pamphlets, and practical papers on the coal trade and mining engineering, many covering safety topics.

In particular he emphasised the need for adequate underground air-flow rate to neutralize gases, and promoted developments such as the use of barometers to monitor changes; cast-iron equipment; improved boiler safety valves and wire rope. He championed the better management of safety lamps and encouraged the work of those like William Reid Clanny who made improvements to lamps.

He advocated better education for those who managed and worked in the mines, believing that instruction should focus on technology and science, so that mine managers and men were aware of the dangers of their working environment,

He began to argue for government involvement in regulating mines, noting that "profit is the main object of working a coal mine" and that there is "the supposition that all persons, proprietors, agents, contractors &c. are always ready to adopt whatever may be requisite for the safety of the people. Owners would choose how safe their mine should be, despite any recommendations there might be from their viewers.

A House of Lords Select Committee was set up in 1848 to enquire into the prevention of mine accidents and in that year Dunn brought out his ‘’Treatise on the winning and working of collieries’’ including some practical ways in which issues of mining safety could be addressed. In 1849 he was an expert witness before the Select Committee where he pressed for compulsory government inspection, one of the few managers and owners to do so. He asked for regulations, but "as few and as simple" as possible; said that further advances in legislation should be made as "the state of opinion" ripened and argued for high technical and scientific qualifications for the inspectors and for the development of Schools of Mines.

The Coal Mines Inspection Act 1850, setting up an inspectorate, was the outcome of the select committee's recommendations.

== Mine inspector ==
Dunn was appointed one of the first four government mines inspectors under the act. Initially he had responsibility for Northumberland, Durham, Cumberland, and Scotland, but his workload was excessive and an inspector to cover Scotland was appointed in 1853. He was relatively poorly paid (initially £400 per annum plus travelling expenses) when compared with government inspectors in other fields – a factory inspector earned £1,000 – and many colliery viewers. He did however continue to act as a consultant. The inspectors' influence was limited to recommendation and admonition. Dunn urged miners to contact him if they were anxious about the condition of their pits, stressing that he did not have the power to enter and inspect mines uninvited. His position as government inspector nevertheless enhanced and strengthened his reputation as a mining engineer. He was seen to have integrity and honesty and was generally accepted by owners and miners, though in 1863 the directors at Cleator Moor Colliery tried to have him dismissed.

Following an explosion at Seaham colliery in Durham in June 1852 Dunn and some mine viewers met and put forward proposals for a forum where practical knowledge and scientific developments in mining especially relating to safety could be shared and discussed. The result was the setting up of the North of England Institute of Mining Engineers (from 1870 the North of England Institute of Mining and Mechanical Engineers) which held its first meeting in September 1852. As an inspector Dunn was an honorary member of the Institute Council and gave a number of papers before the institute.

Dunn believed that some technical and practical knowledge was needed by all levels of mine employees to help in preventing and dealing with accidents so in 1862 published A practical treatise on the best means of preventing accidents in coal mines. This was a revision of a book first published in 1852 and provided a checklist of good practice; noted the appropriate duties of managers and discussed the role of inspection.

== Other activities ==
Dunn was one of the founder members of the management committee of the Newcastle upon Tyne Joint Stock Banking Company established in 1836. In 1835 he produced a pamphlet in association with the engineer Robert Hawthorn setting out the advantages of a railway between Newcastle and Morpeth, intended to form the first phase of a rail link with Edinburgh.

== Personal life ==
Dunn married Margaret Warden Hill Rennie (1794–1869), daughter of Captain Archibald Hill Rennie of Balliliesk, Clackmannanshire, Scotland, High Sheriff of Clackmannanshire, and his wife, Isabella Mortimer on 19 January 1829 at Alloa, Clackmannanshire, and had four children: Isabella Agnes (1830–1907), Robert (1831–1840), Archibald Matthias Dunn (1832–1917) - who became a prominent Catholic architect - and Margaret Mortimer (1836–1875).

Dunn was also a leading member of the Roman Catholic community in the North East and attended the ‘Great Meeting of Catholics’ at Ushaw College in July 1858.

Though he had some financial involvement in mines Dunn never seems to have become a partner in any of the major North East colliery companies, unlike people such as Nicholas Wood who became rich men. Dunn lived mainly off his consultancies, individual major reviews and evaluations and later his inspector's salary.

In 1866, owing to ill health - though he was 78 - Dunn retired from his inspectorship. He died on 10 October 1869, just a few months after his wife, at Whitecliffe, Caterham, Surrey, where he had moved from Newcastle to be near his daughter.

== Publications by Matthias Dunn ==
=== Books and pamphlets ===
- Dunn, M. Prospectus of a railway from Newcastle to Morpeth, to be called the Northumberland Railway … 1835
- Dunn, M. An historical, geological and descriptive view of the coal trade of the North of England; comprehending its rise, progress, present state and future prospects. To which are appended a concise notice of the peculiarities of certain coal fields in Great Britain and Ireland, and also a general description of the coal mines of Belgium. 1844
- Dunn, M. Review of the report of Messrs Lyell and Faraday, upon the subject of explosions in coal mines, arising from the catastrophe at Haswell in September 1844. 1845
- Dunn, M. A treatise on the winning and working of collieries; including numerous statistics regarding ventilation and the prevention of accidents in mines, and illustrated with explanatory engravings and colliery plans. 1848
- Dunn, M. A treatise on the winning and working of collieries; including numerous statistics, and remarks on ventilation, and illustrated by plans and engravings: to which are appended a glossary and index. 1852.
- Dunn, M. How to prevent accidents in collieries. 1852
- Dunn, M. and others Report on ventilation of mines with reference to the steam-jet and furnaces at Seaton Delaval Colliery. 1853
- Dunn, M. A history of the steam-jet, as applicable to the ventilation of coal mines: Comprising extracts from parliamentary evidence, scientific investigations, ... working of the present mine inspection Act. 1854
- Dunn, M. How to prevent accidents in collieries. A practical treatise upon the best means of preventing accidents in Coal Mines, also, advice regarding proceedings after explosion. 1862.

=== Journal articles ===
- Dunn, M. Remarks on the state of Belgium and France in respect to the production of coals compared with England and Scotland Transactions - North of England Institute of Mining Engineers 4 1855–56, 287–305
- Dunn, M. On boiler explosions Transactions - North of England Institute of Mining Engineers 4 1855–56, 39–53
- Dunn, M. On the coalfields of Cumberland and the problems of coal being found under the new red sandstone which surrounds the city of Carlisle Transactions - North of England Institute of Mining Engineers 8 1859–60, 141–160

== Sources and further reading ==
=== Main sources ===
- Ray, M. Dunn, Matthias (bap. 1788, d. 1869), Oxford Dictionary of National Biography, Oxford University Press, Sept 2015 accessed 20 June 2016 - Available on subscription and through public libraries.
- Stokes, W. Matthias Dunn: campaigner for mining safety, c.1789-1869 Bulletin, Durham County Local History Society 69 2006, 3–20

=== Others ===
- Job, B. The British Mines Inspectorate: the early years 1850–1872, Mining Engineer 145 April 1986, 426–31
- Job, B. The formation and early development of the Mines Inspectorate Mining engineer 153 1993–4, 249–255
- Job, B. The first coal mines' Inspectors British Mining (48) 1993, 152–158.
- MacDonagh, O. Coal mines regulation: the first decade, 1842–1852, in Robson, R (ed.), Ideas and institutions of Victorian Britain 1967, 58–86
- Sill, M The journal of Matthias Dunn, 1831-36: some observations of a colliery viewer in Sturgess, R.W. Pitmen, viewers and coal masters: essays in North East coal mining in the Nineteenth Century. North East Labour History Society, 1986, 55–80
- Sill, M. The diary of Matthias Dunn, colliery viewer, 1831-1836 Local historian 16(7) 1985, 418–424
- Thompson, R. Thunder underground: Northumberland mine disasters 1815-1865. 2004, 117–125.
- Mr Matthias Dunn [Obituary] Colliery Guardian 15 Oct 1869, 376

== See also ==
- Prestongrange
- Coal mining
- Problems in coal mining
