= Curr =

Curr is an English surname.

== People ==
- Edward Curr (1798–1850), Australian settler and politician
  - Edward Micklethwaite Curr (1820–1889), his eldest child, Australian pastoralist and squatter
- John Curr (c. 1756–1823), English manager of collieries and innovator
- Joseph Curr (1793–1847), Roman Catholic priest and author

== Places ==
- Curr, a townland in County Londonderry, Northern Ireland
- Curr, a townland in County Tyrone, Northern Ireland
- Skye of Curr
