= William Hutton (1797–1860) =

British geologist (1797–1860)

William Hutton (26 July 1797 – 20 November 1860) was a British geologist.

== Biography ==
Hutton was born 26 July 1797 in Sunderland, the son of a colliery viewer, but was settled in Newcastle-on-Tyne by 1827. He was an agent of the Norwich Fire Insurance Company. He soon acquired a reputation as a practical geologist, an authority upon the coal measures, and an ardent collector of coal-fossils. It was said that 'The fossils of our coal-fields first found an exponent in him.' John Buddle gave him great advantages in his researches. He was an honorary secretary of the Newcastle Natural History Society from its foundation in 1829 till he left Newcastle in 1846. He wrote a number of papers for the society's 'Transactions' between 1831 and 1838.

He was elected a Fellow of the Royal Society in June, 1840.

He helped establish mechanics' institutes in the north of England. He was a fellow of the Geological Society of London, and contributed papers to its Transactions in 1846, Hutton settled at Malta, but returned to Newcastle in 1857, and then West Hartlepool, where he died 20 Nov. 1860.

His portrait, by Carrick, is in the possession of the North of England Institute of Mining and Mechanical Engineers at Newcastle-on-Tyne. After his death Professor G. A. Lebour edited from his papers and from those of Dr. Lindley 'Illustrations of Fossil Plants,' London, 1877; this was published for the North of England Institute of Mining and Mechanical Engineers, and contained a reproduction of Carrick's portrait of Hutton. Hutton's valuable collections of fossils, which passed to the council of the Mining Institute, is now partly in the Museum of the Natural History Society at Newcastle, and partly in the Museum of the Durham College of Physical Science in the same town.
