= George Clementson Greenwell =

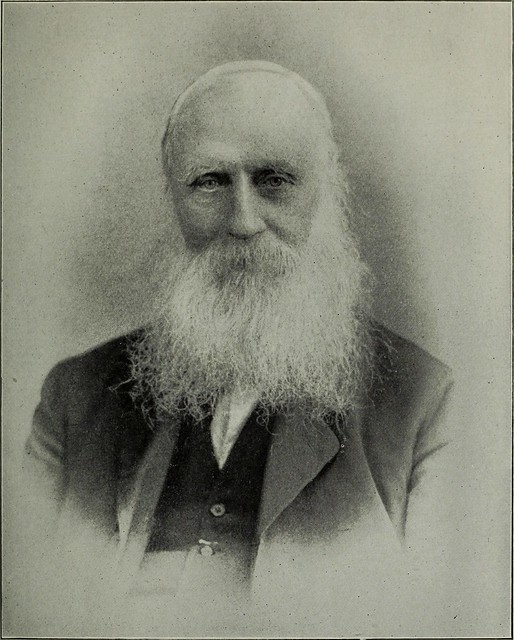
- Born: 25 July 1821; Newcastle-upon-Tyne
- Died: 6 November 1900 (aged 79); Duffield, Derbyshire
- Education: University of Edinburgh
- Engineering career
- Discipline: Mining and civil engineering
- Institutions: North of England Institute of Mining and Mechanical Engineers, Institution of Civil Engineers

George Clementson Greenwell (25 July 1821 – 6 November 1900) was a British mining engineer.

== Career ==
George Clementson Greenwell was born on 25 July 1821 in Newcastle upon Tyne. He was educated at Darlington Queen Elizabeth Grammar School, Percy Street Academy, Newcastle, and went on to the University of Edinburgh.

Greenwell joined the mining industry, and from 1838 to 1842 was apprenticed to Mr Thomas Emerson Forster at Haswell Colliery, From 1843 he worked for Thomas John Taylor of Earsdon until 1845 when he became Viewer at Black Boy and West Auckland collieries. He moved in 1848 to "Marley Hill" and in 1854 to manage mines at Radstock in Somerset and from 1863 at Poynton and Worth in Cheshire. In 1876 he moved back to the North East of England to Tynemouth (and later on to Duffield) and practised as a consulting engineer.

In 1852 Greenwell was one of the founders of the North of England Institute of Mining and Mechanical Engineers, initially sitting on the first council, and from 1875 as Vice-President and from 1879-1881 as President. He became an honorary member of the Institute in 1889. He was also an active member of the Institution of Civil Engineers, a Fellow of the Geological Society of London and a member (and thrice President) of the Manchester Geological Society. George Clementson Greenwell died on 6 November 1900.

== Publications ==
Greewell many published papers included

- 1849 - A glossary of terms used in the coal trade of Northumberland and Durham
- 1850 - A practical treatise on mine engineering.
- 1899 The Autobiography of George Clementson Greenwell.
