= National Coal Board =

British statutory corporation, 1946–1987

- National Coal Board logo
- Abbreviation: NCB
- Successor: British Coal
- Formation: 15 July 1946; 80 years ago
- Dissolved: 5 March 1987; 39 years ago
- Legal status: Statutory corporation
- Purpose: "Working and getting the coal in Great Britain, and securing the efficient development of the coal-mining industry."
- Headquarters: Hobart House, Grosvenor Place, London SW1
- Products: Coal
- Owner: UK Government
- Chairman: Lord Hyndley (1947–1951); Sir Hubert Houldsworth (1951–1956); Sir Jim Bowman (1956–1961); Lord Robens (1961–1971); Sir Derek Ezra (1971–1981); Norman Siddall (1981–1983); Ian MacGregor (1983–1986); Sir Robert Haslam (1986–1987)

The National Coal Board (NCB) was the statutory corporation created to run the nationalised coal mining industry in the United Kingdom. Set up under the Coal Industry Nationalisation Act 1946, it took over the United Kingdom's collieries on "vesting day", 1 January 1947. In 1987, the NCB was renamed the British Coal Corporation, and its assets were subsequently privatised.

== Background ==
Collieries were taken under government control during the First and Second World Wars. The Sankey Commission in 1919 gave R. H. Tawney, Sidney Webb and Sir Leo Chiozza Money the opportunity to advocate nationalisation, but it was rejected.

Coal reserves were nationalised during the war in 1942 and placed under the control of the Coal Commission, but the mining industry remained in private hands. At the time, many coal companies were small, although some consolidation had taken place in the years before the war.

== Formation and organisation ==
The NCB was one of several public corporations created by Clement Attlee's post-war Labour government to manage nationalised industries. The Coal Industry Nationalisation Act 1946 received royal assent on 12 July 1946, and the NCB was formally constituted on 15 July, with Lord Hyndley as its chairman. On 1 January 1947, a notice posted at every colliery in the country read, "This colliery is now managed by the National Coal Board on behalf of the people". Opencast operations were taken over on 1 April 1952.

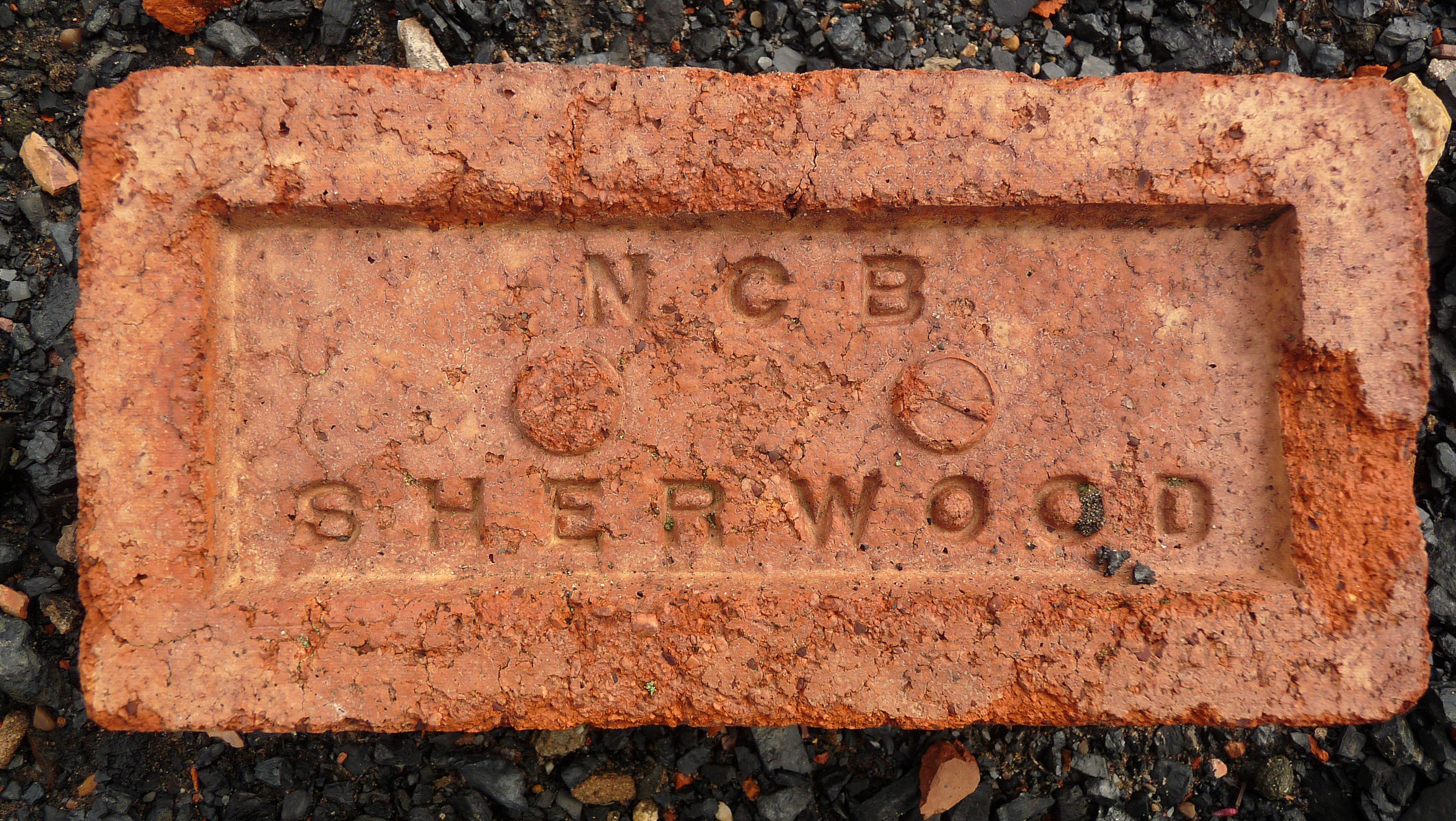
Brick made at NCB Sherwood

The NCB acquired 958 collieries, the property of about 800 companies. Compensation of £164,660,000 was paid to the owners for the collieries and £78,457,000 to former owners and for other assets such as 55 coke ovens, 85 brickworks and 20 smokeless fuel plants. The collieries it had acquired varied considerably in size and output. Coal was mined from seams that varied from 20 to 200 inches thick and the average pit produced 245,000 tons annually. More than a third of collieries produced less than 100,000 tons and 50 collieries produced more than 700,000 tons.

The coal board divided the country into divisions, corresponding to the major coalfields, and each division was divided into areas with an output of approximately 4 million tons. The board also took over power stations at some collieries and railway sidings. It managed an estate of more than 140,000 houses and more than 200,000 acres of farmland. At its inception, the NCB employed nearly 800,000 workers, which was four percent of Britain's total workforce. Its national headquarters were established in Hobart House, London.

== Formal duties ==
The formal duties of the National Coal Board (defined by section 1 of the Coal Industry Nationalisation Act 1946) were:

(a) working and getting the coal in Great Britain, to the exclusion of any other person;

(b) securing the efficient development of the coal-mining industry; and

(c) making supplies of coal available, of such qualities and sizes, in such quantities and at such prices, as may seem to them best calculated to further the public interest in all respects, including the avoidance of any undue or unreasonable preference or advantage.

== History ==
In 1947, about half the collieries needed immediate attention and a development programme was begun. Between 1947 and 1956, the NCB spent more than £550 million on major improvements and new sinkings, much of it to mechanise the coal-getting process underground and by 1957 Britain's collieries were producing cheaper coal than anywhere in Europe. The Plan for Coal produced in 1950 aimed at increasing output from 184 million to 250 million tons by 1970.

Competition from cheap oil imports arrived at the end of the 1950s, and in 1957 the coal industry began to contract. Between 1958 and 1959, 85 collieries closed. In 1960, Alf Robens became the chairman of the NCB, and he introduced a policy concentrating on the most productive pits. During his ten-year tenure, productivity increased by 70%, but with far fewer pits and a much reduced workforce. In 1967, the NCB reorganised its structure into 17 new areas each employing about 20,000 men. In 1956, 700,000 men produced 207 million tons of coal; by 1971, fewer than 290,000 workers were producing 133 million tons at 292 collieries.

On 21 October 1966, a catastrophic collapse of a colliery spoil tip above the Welsh village of Aberfan, near Merthyr Tydfil in Wales caused the Aberfan disaster. The tip had been created on a mountain slope above the village and overlaid a natural spring. Heavy rain led to a build-up of water within the tip which caused it to suddenly slide downhill as a slurry, killing 116 children and 28 adults as it engulfed Pantglas Junior School and a row of houses. The tip was the responsibility of the National Coal Board (NCB), and the subsequent inquiry placed the blame for the disaster on the organisation and nine named employees.

The 1974 Plan for Coal produced in the aftermath of the 1972 miners' strike envisaged that the coal industry would replace 40 million tons of obsolete capacity and ageing pits while maintaining its output. By 1983, the NCB would invest £3,000 million on developing new collieries.

In 1984, it was alleged that the NCB had a list of collieries earmarked for closure and its chairman, Ian MacGregor indicated that the board was looking to reduce output by 4 million tons, a contributory factor in the 1984-85 miners' strike. The strike was one of the longest and most bitter in history and caused great suffering for the striking miners. During the strike, the NCB lost markets and 23 collieries had closed before the end of 1985.

On 5 March 1987, the Coal Industry Act 1987 (c. 3) received royal assent, signalling the end of the NCB and the formation of its successor, the British Coal Corporation.

== Other activities ==
=== Research ===
The NCB's Coal Research Establishment (CRE) at Stoke Orchard in Gloucestershire was founded in 1950 with Jacob Bronowski as Director of Research. It closed following the privatisation of the coal mining industry. The Stoke Orchard library was safeguarded after closure and is now held by the North of England Institute of Mining and Mechanical Engineers.

The Mining Research and Development Establishment was formed in 1969 by merger of the Central Engineering Establishment and Mining Research Establishment to undertake research into and testing of mining equipment and procedures. It was based in Bretby, Derbyshire. Following the rationalisation of the NCB from 1985, the MRDE merged with the Mining Department.

=== Railways ===
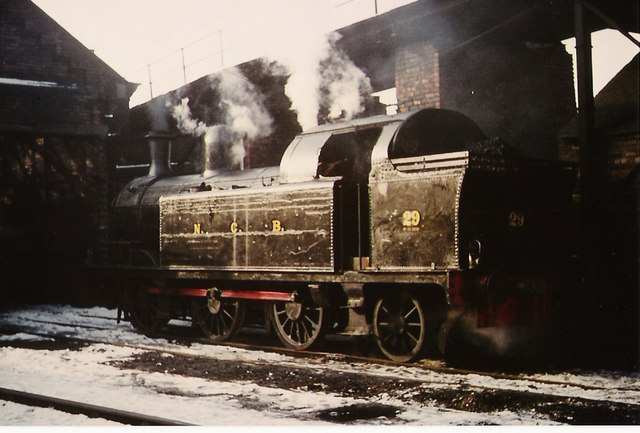
No. 29 ready for duty at Philadelphia NCB shed

The NCB operated extensive industrial railway systems at its collieries, employing steam traction until autumn 1982 when Bold Colliery ended regular use of steam locomotives.

=== Subsidiaries ===
NCB subsidiaries managed coal based chemical products (Coal Products Division) and the production of helmets and other mining equipment (Tredomen Engineering Ltd). In the mid 1970s, the activities of Coal Products Division were transferred to two new companies; National Smokeless Fuels Ltd and Thomas Ness Ltd, although they remained wholly owned by the NCB.

=== Films ===
In 1952, the NCB established a film unit. The board was keen to train its staff and new recruits and initiated a scheme to produce technical films as well as commissioning films from outside companies. More than nine hundred films were made before the unit closed in 1984.

=== Housing ===
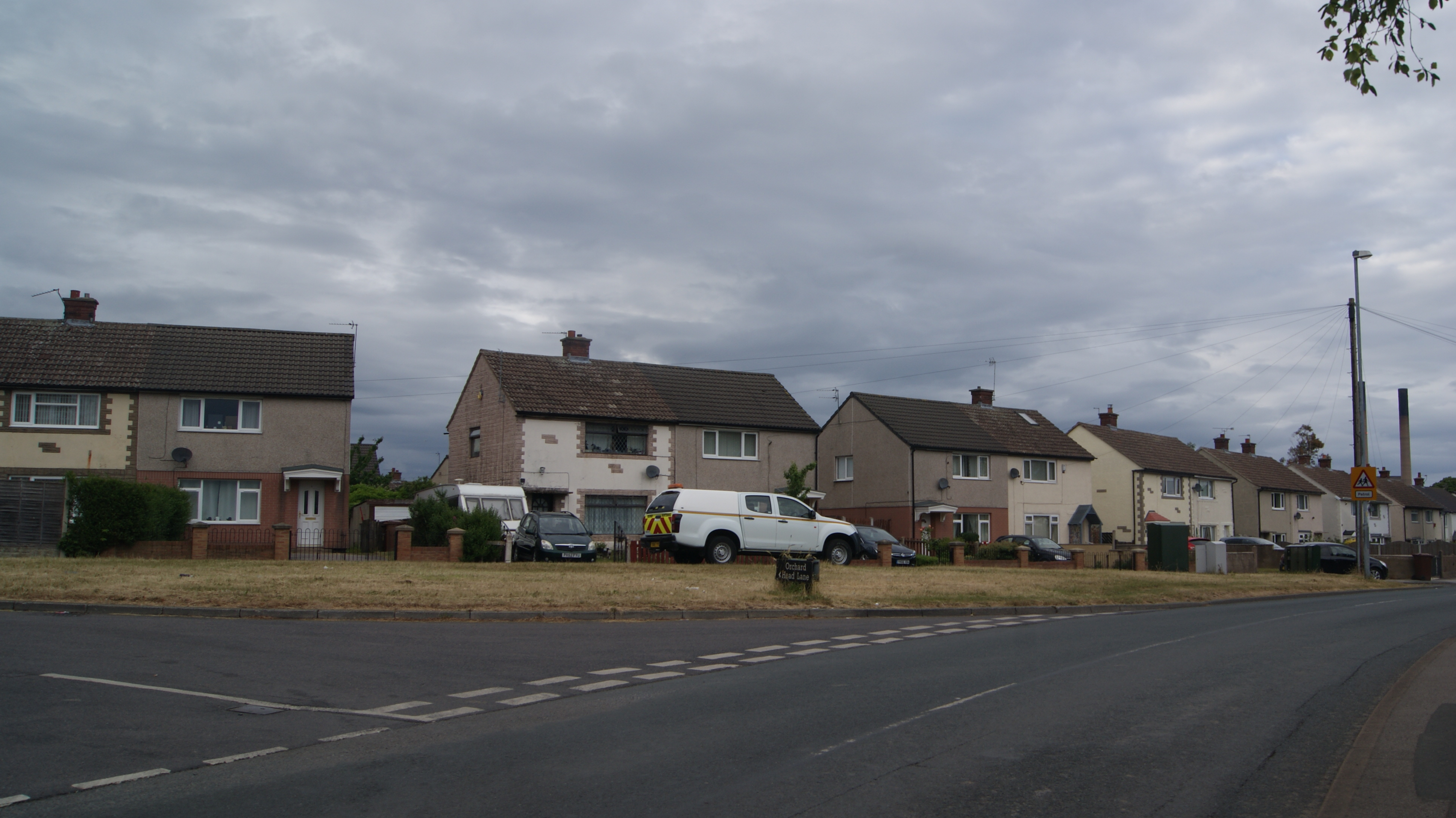
Former NCB houses in Pontefract.

The NCB was a major landlord, owning thousands of houses rented to miners and others involved in the industry. At the time of the 1984-85 miners strike, it owned around 170,000 houses of various ages. Shortly after this the government instructed the NCB to sell its stock of houses, some of which were bought by the miners or former miners, and others were sold to property speculators.

== Arms ==
Coat of arms of National Coal Board
Escutcheon Per fess Argent and Sable three fusils conjoined in fess counterchanged. Supporters On either side a lion Sable charged on the shoulder with a sun in splendour Or. Motto E Tenebris Lux (Light Out of Darkness)

== See also ==
- Aberfan disaster
- British Coal
- Edwards v National Coal Board
- Energy policy of the United Kingdom
- Energy use and conservation in the United Kingdom
- European Coal and Steel Community
- National Coal Board Labour Staff Association
