= Addison Langhorne Steavenson =

English mining engineer (1836–1913)

- Born: 4 August 1836
- Died: 7 November 1913 (aged 77); Hollywell Hall, Brancepeth, County Durham
- Spouse: Anna Maria Wilson
- Children: 3 Daughters, Anna, Frances and Hilda 2 Sons, Charles Herbert Steavenson and Addison Langhorne Junior
- Engineering career
- Institutions: North of England Institute of Mining and Mechanical Engineers
- Employer: Bell Brother Ltd.

Addison Langhorne Steavenson (4 August 1836 – 7 November 1913) was an English Mining Engineer. He became President of the North of England Institute of Mining and Mechanical Engineers (NEIMME) in 1893 after being a member of the Institute for thirty-eight years. Steavenson was married to Anna Maria Wilson; they had three daughters named Anna, Frances and Hilda and two sons called Addison Langhorne Junior, who died young, and Charles Herbert Steavenson who went on to become a mining engineer in his own right.

== Early life ==
Steavenson was born on 4 August 1836 in Darlington. He was one of three children born to Addison Thomas Steavenson (1799–1861), a solicitor, and Maria Theresa Strother (1798–1870). He was elected a member of the North of England Institute of Mining and Mechanical Engineers on 6 December 1855 at the age of nineteen. Initially Steavenson worked at Woodifield Colliery, Crook. He then worked for various Cleveland ironstone mines, most notably Normanby and Skelton. He became an expert in the mining geology of the Cleveland district which was exemplified in his article for The Engineer newspaper entitled 'Ironstone Mining in Cleveland'. He later returned to coal mines in the Durham area working as Chief Agent for Bell Brother Ltd.

== Mining career ==
Steavenson was elected a member of the NEIMME Council in 1867 aged thirty-one and in 1877 he was elected vice-president of the NEIMME. During his time as vice-president he visited parts of Spain which inspired his paper 'On the Value of Photography to Mining Engineers'. During his talk he exhibited the photographs he had taken in Bilbao. The exhibition consisted of images of ore being shipped in steamers and wire-rope tramways which also transported ore. He thought these were the most notable photographs as he believed the members had not witnessed the tramways in action before. He additionally exhibited photographs of the local history and culture as he displayed images of Burgos Cathedral as well as pictures of the homes which the local population lived in. The purpose of Steavenson's talk was to display to the engineers that photography was essential in not only gaining personal knowledge, but displaying matters of interest to others who could not see for themselves what was being photographed. He believed that photography was also useful to provide evidence for the future as mining techniques advanced and progressed. Steavenson was congratulated for his paper as the institute's members complimented not only his mining intellect, but his evident ability as an excellent photographer. Steavenson recollected that his passion for photography had begun ten years prior as he recalls taking his first underground photographs of fungus growing at the Cleveland Mines. This later developed into taking photographs of tubs and mining machinery underground.

Steavenson was a highly celebrated intellect as well as a photographer and frequently wrote papers and presented lectures at the NEIMME. His papers can be found within the Transactions of the North of England Institute of Mining and Mechanical Engineers. In 1891 Steavenson notably won an award for his paper entitled 'Notes on the Present Position of the Question of Transmission of Power' as the institute acknowledged his academic efforts.

Steavenson became President of the NEIMME between the years 1893 and 1894. On being elected president he admits that he had difficulty in accepting the position as president due to his deafness. He believed his condition would affect his ability, yet he nevertheless accepted the role. He advocated the need of pit work in order to gain valuable experience, not solely academic knowledge. He was also renowned for his determination to prove the accuracy of conclusions with regards to experiments. When a paper was read at the Institute he encouraged debate and discussion after it had been given. As he facetiously remarked after a paper was given by Professor Henry Louis in 1907, that 'he did not like to allow a paper to pass without objecting to its proposals'. In 1894 Thomas Douglas succeeded him as President of the Institute and Steavenson returned to his role as vice-president.

Throughout his time at the NEIMME, Steavenson worked as the Chief Agent for the coal company Bell Brothers Ltd. In 1901, Matthew Robson Kirby became Steavenson's apprentice. Kirby was trained, like Steavenson, to be an Agent for Bell Brothers Ltd. Bowburn was one of the collieries under the Bell Brothers ownership which Steavenson worked for. On 10 September 1906 Steavenson notably led an excursion meeting of Associates and Students at Bowburn Winning to witness a shaft being sunk. His engineer apprentice Matthew Robson Kirby also helped host this event alongside Steavenson. A street in the village of Bowburn was named 'Steavenson Street' in honour of him and his work in the area. While working for Bell Brothers he was Agent for multiple collieries including Browney, South Brancepeth, Page Bank and Tursdale.

Despite Steavenson's credentials as a colliery Agent and Engineer, his opinion was sometimes critiqued. In 1906 there was an explosion at Urpeth Colliery, Durham. Steavenson reported on the incident believing that Urpeth Colliery was in the best possible condition and that the Incident occurred due to the disregard of the men working within the pit. However his opinion caused much controversy and discussion among institute members, most notably William Cuthbert Blackett who criticised Steavenson's report believing his evidence was not plausible.

== Legacy ==
Steavenson died in 1913 aged seventy-seven at Hollywell Hall, Brancepeth. President W.C Blackett noted on Steavenson's passing that he was 'a most fearless exponent of accuracy and truth, and a most enduring friend to all young men'. Despite only being president for a year, he had been part of the Institute for his whole career. This legacy was acknowledged as Thomas Douglas proposed a vote of thanks on his presidential election as 'Mr. Steavenson had devoted an amount of time and energy to the institute, not only this year, because he happened to be the President, but during the whole of the very long time that he had been connected with the Institute'.

== Publications and Papers ==
A. L Steavenson's publications and papers in chronological order:

- 'The Manufacture of Coke', Transactions of the North of England Institute of Mining and Mechanical Engineers, Vol.VIII 1860
- 'On Some Experiments with the Covered Ventilator of M.Guibal, at the Colliery of Crachet & Picquery, At Fremeries. By MM. Gille et Franeau, Mining Engineers. Translated and Read by A. L Steavenson', Transactions of the North of England Institute of Mining and Mechanical Engineers, Vol. XVI, 1866–7
- 'On Some Experiments with the Lemielle Ventilator at Page Bank Colliery', Transactions of the North of England Institute of Mining and Mechanical Engineers, Vol. XVIII, 1868–1869
- 'Coal-Cutting And Breaking Down Apparatus', Transactions of the North of England Institute of Mining and Mechanical Engineers, Vol. XIX, 1869–70
- 'Ironstone Mining in Cleveland', The Engineer, 18 September 1874, p. 219
- 'An Improved Method of Detecting Small Quantities of Inflammable Gas', Transactions of the North of England Institute of Mining and Mechanical Engineers, Vol. XXVI 1876–7
- 'On the System of Working Ironstone at Lumpsey Mines by Hydraulic Drills.', Transactions of the North of England Institute of Mining and Mechanical Engineers, Vol. XXVI 1886–7
- 'On the Introduction of Steel Supports for the Maintenance of the Main Roads in the Mines of Cleveland', Transactions of the North of England Institute of Mining and Mechanical Engineers, Vol. XXXVII 1887–8
- 'Notes on the Present Position of the Question of Transmission of Power', Transactions of the North of England Institute of Mining and Mechanical Engineers, Vol. IV, 1892–1893
- 'On the Last Twenty Years in the Cleveland Mining District', The Engineer, 15 September 1893
- 'The Mode of Obtaining a True North Line', Transactions of the North of England Institute of Mining and Mechanical Engineers, Vol. X, 1895
- 'On Some Dangers Attending the Use of Steam-Pipes, Transactions of the North of England Institute of Mining and Mechanical Engineers, Vol. XIII, 1896–7
- 'On Experiments with Bastiers Patent Chain-Pump', Transactions of the North of England Institute of Mining and Mechanical Engineers, Vol. XVI
- 'The Carboniferous Limestone Quarries of Weardale', Transactions of the North of England Institute of Mining and Mechanical Engineers, Vol. XXII, 1901
