= John Curr =

British engineer and inventor (c.1756-1823)

John Curr (c. 1756 – 27 January 1823) was an English mining engineer and inventor who was the viewer of the Duke of Norfolk's collieries in Sheffield, England from 1781 to 1801. During this time he made a number of innovations that contributed significantly to the development of the coal mining industry and railways.

== Personal life ==
Curr was born in County Durham, England in around 1756. He was raised and remained a Catholic throughout his life. He moved to Sheffield some time before 1776. In 1780 he was appointed superintendent of the Duke of Norfolk's Sheffield collieries. He married Hannah Wilson (18 May 1759 – 10 June 1851) in about 1785, and they had eight children, including Joseph Curr, a Catholic priest, and Edward Curr, who was Secretary of the Van Diemen's Land Company from 1824 to 1841. He died in Sheffield on 27 January 1823.

== Career ==
The career of John Curr has been subject to significant dispute, due to inaccurate statements by early authors about him and misinterpretation. Older works (such as (or those quoting them) often give the date of his colliery inventions as 1776. Curr probably came to Sheffield in 1778. That August, shortly before the expiry of the lease of Sheffield colliery (in Sheffield Park), he wrote a report on it for the Duke of Norfolk. Contrary to statements by his son, he was probably not there in 1774, when there were riots against the colliery lessees, who insisted on selling coal only at a yard in Sheffield. From Michaelmas 1779, he became superintendent of the Duke's Coal Works.

In 1787, John Buddle, senior reported on the transport system introduced by Curr. He reported Curr's method using L-shaped cast iron plates cost 6¼d per waggon, whereas the old method cost 10½d per waggon, a saving of 3¾d. He also referred to Mr Curr's method of 'drawing 2 corves abreast up a shaft 8½ to 9-foot diameter by means of steadying conductors'. Curr substituted small four-wheeled carriages for the sledges that had previously been used to transport coal underground, but this meant that underground haulage by boys, rather than ponies. The corf wheels and 'roadplates' came from Binks, Booth, and Hartop's nearby Park Ironworks.

The use of these rails was subsequently promoted by Benjamin Outram and adopted at many other English mines, quarries and ironworks. In south Wales, railways using his system were known as tramroads (or dramroads). Today, the term plateway is sometimes applied to them.

== Patents ==
| Year | Number | Subject | |
|---|---|---|---|
| 1788 | 1660 | For raising coals out of mines using "conductors" with tiplers at the surface | |
| 1792 | 1924 | For using double ropes | |
| 1798 | 1924 | For using flat ropes wound in coils on the winding drum | 3711|Applying flat ropes to horse-gins |

== Publications ==
- Curr, John (1797). The Coal Viewer, and Engine Builder's Practical Companion. Sheffield: John Northall. OCLC 637327681.

== See also ==
- Edward Micklethwaite Curr, John Curr's grandson

== References and notes ==
Sources

- Ashton, Thomas Southcliffe; Sykes, Joseph (1929). The Coal Industry of the Eighteenth Century. Manchester: Manchester University Press. OCLC 3634819.
- Day, Lance; McNeil, Ian (1996). Biographical Dictionary of the History of Technology. London: Routledge. ISBN 0-415-06042-7.
- Dixon, Charles (2025). John Curr: The Man Who Revolutionised Mining. Heritage Hunter. ISBN 978-1-905315-888.
- Galloway, Robert Lindsay (1898). Annals of Coal Mining and the Coal Trade: The invention of the steam engine and the origin of the railway. London: The Colliery Guardian Company, Limited.
- Lewis, M. J. T. (1970). Early Wooden Railways. Routledge & K. Paul. ISBN 978-0-7100-6674-9.
- Mott, R.A. (1969). "Tramroads of the eighteenth century and their originator: John Curr". Transactions of the Newcomen Society. XLII (1): 1–23. doi:10.1179/tns.1969.001.
- Medlicott, Ian R. (1983). "John Curr and the Development of the Sheffield Collieries, 1781–1805". Transactions of the Hunter Archaeological Society. 12: 51.
- Alexander Lock, Catholicism, Identity and Politics in the Age of Enlightenment: The Life and Career of Sir Thomas Gascoigne, 1745–1810 (Woodbridge: Boydell and Brewer, 2016), ch. 5
- Alexander Lock, ‘Curr, John (1756–1823)’, Oxford Dictionary of National Biography (Oxford: Oxford University Press, September 2015)
