= Colliery viewer =

Coal mine manager and engineer

A colliery viewer or coal viewer was the manager of a coal mine or colliery. The term was mostly used in Britain in the late 18th and 19th centuries. In modern use, the viewer would be the senior and responsible mining engineer at a site.

== Origins ==
The role began as a person to represent the owner of the land, often an aristocrat, who had leased the rights to mine there to another who would 'work' the mine. One of the first formally recorded arrangements for such was at the Ironbridge Gorge in 1608, where Jesse Whittingham leased four adits from James Clifford, at a rent of £200 a year for five years. Clifford had acquired the lands of Wenlock Priory at Broseley in 1560, after the priory's dissolution in 1540. Several such monastic lands moved from traditional tenant farming to entrepreneurial mineral exploitation at this time, spurring the early industrial revolution, particularly around the Gorge.

Land at this time was rarely sold, the aristocratic estates were intent on preserving themselves intact, and so mining rights would usually be in terms of a long-term lease. As both of these gentlemen were affluent, if not titled, they would not be familiar with mining themselves and would not generally wish to become so. As mines grew larger and more complex into the nineteenth century, the role of the viewer shifted to representing the safe technical management of the mine, on behalf of the owner. Later, as mine safety laws were passed, the viewer had a duty to represent the interests of the miners as well.

The viewer was usually employed by the owner, but in some cases was also the owner, or part-owner, themselves. The New Hartley Pit, of the Hartley Colliery disaster, was owned by the Carr brothers, where one brother acted as viewer.

An experienced viewer, known for their good judgement, was recognised as a skilled profession and in the North East they often became an independent contractor or consultant who would advise a number of mines on particular issues, such as sinking a new shaft, or making a new investment. This represented the shift from the viewer as manager or agent, to the development of the modern mining engineer. Even at the time, the distinction between managers, or 'agents', for the day-to-day operation of collieries, and consultant viewers, who advised on the development of new aspects, was never a clear one.

The viewer would be responsible for deciding major expenditures, such as the purchase of a pumping engine or construction of a tramroad or railway. These new technical innovations were described in advisory guide books such as John Curr's The Coal Viewer and Engine Builder's Practical Companion (1797).

== Other roles ==
=== Overman ===
The overman is a deputy to the viewer and involved more directly with the daily work of the pit. When a colliery has a number of pits under a viewer, there is an overman to each pit. The overman has responsibilities for daily and hands-on tasks, such as inspecting the pit's safety each day and recording the work performed for piece work systems.

An overman would be an experienced miner who has been promoted on the basis of experience. (Note: "The old distich of the northern coalfield 'Trapper, Trimmer, Hewer, Under-Overman, and then Viewer' shows how common it has been for generations for a Northumbrian miner to work up from the lowest to the highest grade of his vocation" said the Athenaeum in 1862.) A viewer in the early years, in contrast, would often be a 'gentleman' from a social class comparable to that of the bourgeois owner. In later years, from the mid-19th century, it became more common for viewers to be skilled miners who had risen through the ranks.

Wages in 1849 for an overman were 26 shillings to 28s. per week. This was twice that of other skilled trades, such as blacksmiths, indicative of the responsibility. As for most jobs, down to the lowliest colliers, a house and free small coal (Note: 'Small coal' is coal broken by the process of mining into pieces too small for it to be commercially saleable by the colliery. It burns poorly and although usable on a domestic fire, would clog a large industrial furnace so quickly as to be troublesome. It was thus considered almost as a waste product and so could be offered as a perk to the workers there. It has no relation to charcoal.) were also provided. (Note: This was often less generous than it might seem, as these tied cottages were dependent on employment at the pit, and so anyone leaving employment would also make them and their family homeless.)

There was a distinction in a colliery between 'day wagemen', those such as overmen and engine drivers, who were paid a daily or weekly wage and 'oncostmen', those such as coal cutters and loaders, who were paid according to a 'bargain', a form of piecework. The overman would keep the records of work done underground, so that on the Wednesday before a Friday payday he could 'reckon' with the men and agree the totals of work done.

The overman would also have regular roles underground, whereas the viewer would spend most of their time on the surface.

==== Back-overman ====
Pits in the 19th century worked a two shift system, with a morning or 'fore' shift (6am-2pm) and an afternoon or 'back' shift (2-10pm). Having an overman permanently on site was considered so important that a second deputy or 'back-overman' would work the second shift. Depending on pit conditions, the fore shift might concentrate on winning coal and the back shift on the 'dead work' of timbering and propping roadways etc.

=== Under-viewer ===
The viewer's role, particularly with the development of parliamentary mining regulations in the mid-nineteenth century, was ultimately that of responsibility. Although not necessarily owning the mine or being the engineer engaged to direct it technically, the viewer would be held responsible for any accident.

The under-viewer, under-looker or steward, was a deputy to the viewer. As well as being an assistant to them, their main role was to act as a locum if the viewer is away from the colliery, and to ensure that the responsible person was always present.

=== Check-viewer ===
A viewer employed by the lessor to see that the provisions of the lease are duly observed.

These provisions would include that the area being mined did not exceed the boundaries contracted for in the lease, that the amount of support left by stall and pillar working would be sufficient to avoid surface collapse, and sometimes also that surface waters were not polluted by run-off from mine drainage.

== Notable viewers ==
- William Brown (1717–1782)
- William Hedley (1779–1843) Wylam Colliery, constructed Puffing Billy, one of the first steam locomotives.
- John Buddle (1773–1843), and his father, were both viewers at Wallsend Colliery. Buddle became a successful businessman and the owner of several collieries. As a technical innovator he introduced the Davy safety lamp to pits in the North East and the Steam Elephant locomotive for the Wallsend Waggonway.
- Father of Dr William Hutton, geologist (1797–1860)
- Ralph Dodds, (1792–1874) viewer at High Pit, who first employed George Stephenson as an engineer
- Thomas Emerson Forster C.E. (1802-1875) "the well-known mining engineer", but also in the same newspaper obituary "the most successful viewer since the days of Mr Buddle. He has done more real work, and seen more seams of coal with his own eyes, than any other living follower of the art of mining engineering" (Note: His son, George Baker Forster, also became a well-known mining engineer, but had first read Mathematics at Cambridge, and indeed rowed for them against Oxford at Henley.)
