= Mining Research and Development Establishment =

- MRDE
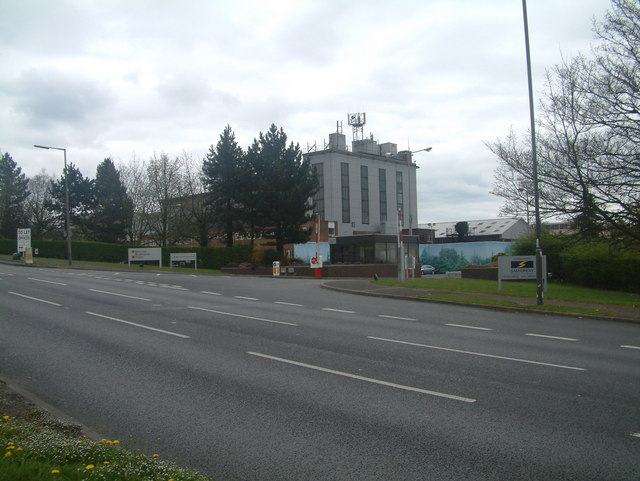
- Bretby Business Park in April 2007

- Location within Derbyshire

General information
- Type: Mining Research Centre
- Location: Bretby, Derbyshire, DE15 0QD
- Coordinates: 52.791°N 1.572°W
- Elevation: 130 m (427 ft)
- Current tenants: Commercial business park
- Construction started: 1969
- Completed: 1969
- Client: National Coal Board
- Owner: NCB

The Mining Research and Development Establishment (MRDE) was a division of the National Coal Board. Its site in Bretby, Derbyshire is now a commercial business park.

== History ==
MRDE's function was research into and testing of mining equipment and procedures.

It was created in 1969 with a merger between the Central Engineering Establishment (CEE) and the Mining Research Establishment (MRE). MRE was set up in 1951 to work on projects in conjunction with National Coal Board (NCB) headquarters divisions such as the Production Department and Scientific Department. It was based at Isleworth in West London. CEE was created in 1954 to work on research and development projects in conjunction with other departments, and was based at Bretby. In 1985 the MRDE merged with the Mining Department.

=== Awards ===
It won the Queens Award for Technological Achievement in 1991 for its extraction drum for dust and frictional ignition control.

== Structure ==
The site was on the south side of the A511 in the south of Derbyshire.

== See also ==
- National Coal Board
