= Steam Elephant =

Early British steam locomotive

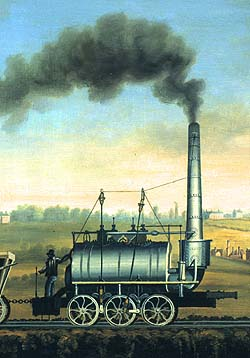
Steam Elephant from an 1820 painting

Steam Elephant was an early steam locomotive from North East England.

== Historiography ==
An illustration of the locomotive first came to modern attention in 1931 and it was then generally assumed to be the work of George Stephenson. More recent interpretation is based on research carried out at Beamish Museum for construction of a replica. This interpretation is based largely on contemporaneous paintings (one being the earliest known oil of a steam locomotive, by an unknown artist) and other material from the Museum archives. It is from the paintings that the name Steam Elephant has become associated specifically with this locomotive.

== Description and interpretation ==
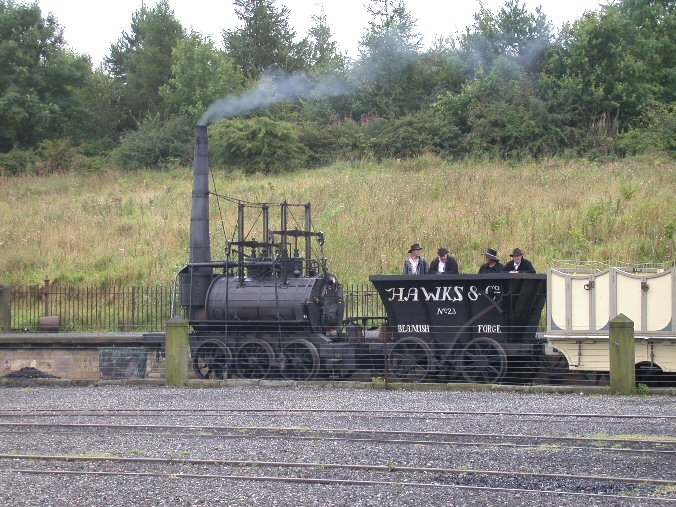
Replica Steam Elephant locomotive, Beamish Museum

Steam Elephant was a six-wheeled locomotive of Stephenson gauge. It was built for the Wallsend Waggonway, an edge railway now known to have been of 4 ft 8 in gauge. (Note: Stephenson's original gauge for these coal railways was 4 ft 8 in, although this would be relaxed by 1/2" for the faster-running Liverpool and Manchester Railway in 1829 to make the modern standard gauge of 4 ft 8 1/2 in (1,435 mm).)

As with Stephenson's Killingworth locomotives of the year before, it had a centre-flue boiler with two vertical cylinders of about 9 by 24 inches (230 mm × 610 mm) set into its top centreline. The cylinders drove slide bar mounted beams which turned crankshafts driving the axles through 2:1 reduction gears between the frames. It had a tall, tapering chimney, the lower part being surrounded by a feedwater heater. It would have weighed about 7.5 tons and had a top speed of around 4.5 miles per hour (7 km/h) and a load capacity of about 90 tons over a short distance.

It is now considered to have been designed by John Buddle and William Chapman for the Wallsend Waggonway and colliery at Wallsend on the north bank of the River Tyne in 1815 using metal components supplied by Hawks of Gateshead. It appears originally not to have been very successful at Wallsend, probably due to lack of adhesion on the wooden rails there, nor on trial at Washington. Following the introduction of iron rails at Wallsend, it had a working life there longer than many contemporaneous locomotives, until at least the mid-1820s.

There is evidence that it was then rebuilt for use at the Hetton collieries, working there for a further decade.

== Replica ==
Steam Elephant was recreated by Beamish Museum to work with passengers on its standard gauge "Pockerley Waggonway" in 2002, being assembled by Alan Keef. The replica was designed and built by engineers Ross Clavell, Jim Rees and Dave Potter, finished in 1998. Clavell also designed and built the famous weather vane atop the engine shed at Beamish.
