= North of England Institute of Mining and Mechanical Engineers =

British learned society and membership organisation

Coordinates: 54.9694°N 1.6143°W

- Abbreviation: The Mining Institute
- Formation: 1852
- Legal status: Royal Chartered Professional Learned Society
- Purpose: The advancement and promotion of Science, Technology and Engineering in the North
- Location: Neville Hall, Westgate Road, Newcastle, NE1
- Members: Industrialists and Academics across Engineering, Science, Technology, and Industrial History in the North and across the UK
- President: Dr Andrew Dobrzański
- Hon. Secretary: Mr David Mobbs
- Hon. Treasurer: Mr Rod Young
- Website: mininginstitute.org.uk

Neville Hall and Wood Memorial Hall, Westgate Road, Newcastle upon Tyne

The North of England Institute of Mining and Mechanical Engineers (NEIMME), commonly known as The Mining Institute, is a British Royal Chartered learned society and membership organisation dedicated to advancing engineering, science and technology in the North and promoting the research and preservation of knowledge relating to mining and mechanical engineering. The membership of the institute is elected on the basis of their academic and professional achievements with Members and Fellows entitled to the postnominal MNEIMME and FNEIMME. The Institute's membership is predominantly from local industry and from academics at Durham and Newcastle Universities, though members are also located further afield across the UK.

The institute was founded in 1852 in Newcastle upon Tyne, and was granted a Royal Charter by Queen Victoria in 1876. The Institute developed one of the largest collections of mining information in the world. Its library, named after the first President Nicholas Wood contains more than twenty thousand volumes of technical literature, in the fields of mining, geology, mechanical engineering, government blue books, mine rescue, mineralogy, mineral chemistry, mining statistics, mining law, seismology and other related topics.

In 2019 the assets of the Institute – building, library and archive collections and staff – were transferred to a separate charity, The Common Room of the Great North, established to "celebrate the region's engineering history through education and engagement, with a vision to inspire the next generation of innovators and engineers". Neville Hall, the Institute building, was closed for refurbishment in 2019.

The Institute itself continues as an independent professional membership organisation for engineers, and is currently developing a new strategy that aims to increase its activities.

== History ==
=== Origins and formation ===
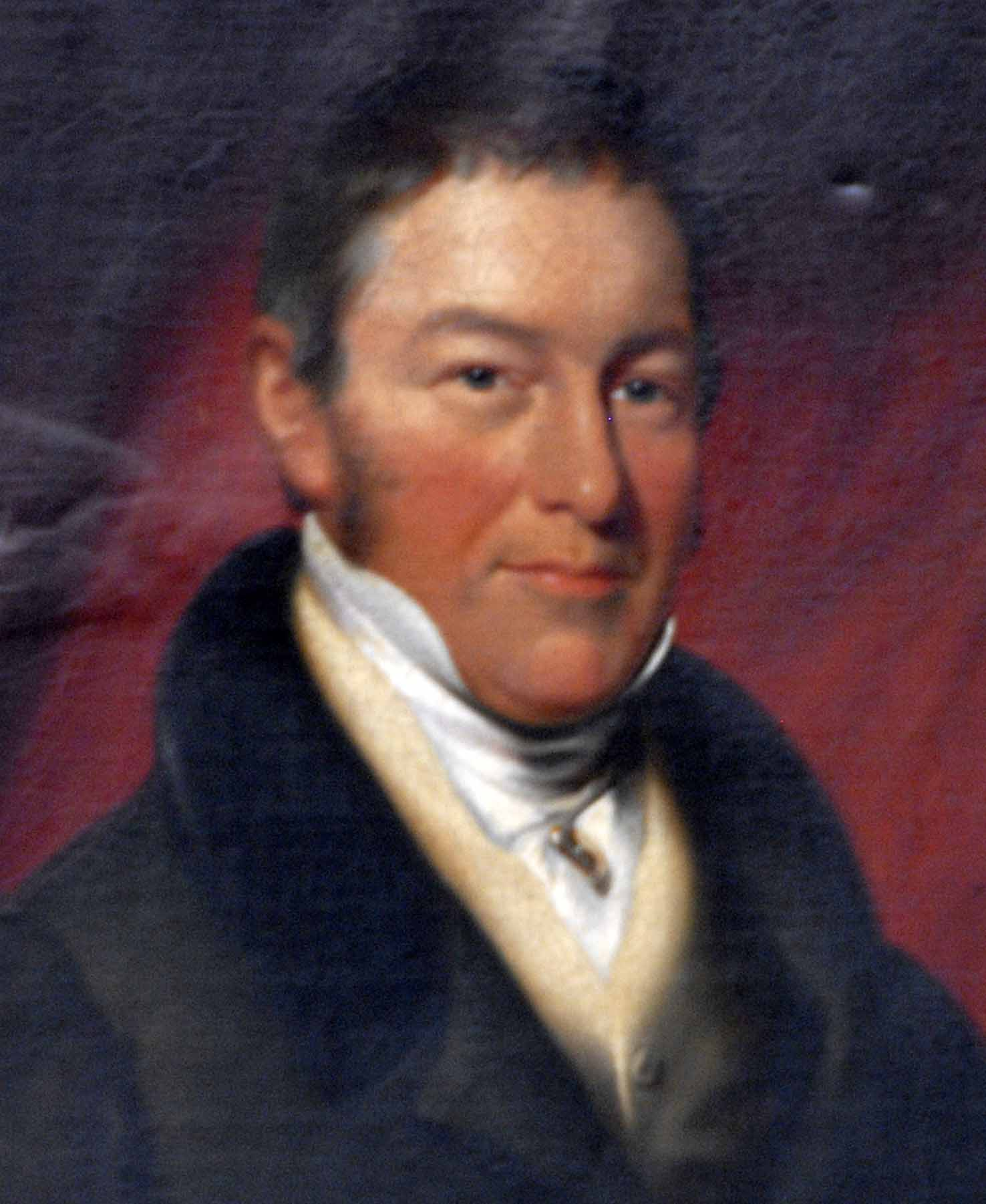
John Buddle

The origins of the Institute stem from William Turner, minister of the Hanover Square Chapel, just behind the position of Newcastle railway station. He began Newcastle's first Sunday School, 'a focus of light and learning' for the town. One of his students, John Buddle, became a viewer (mining engineer) and wealthy mine owner, and member of the Literary and Philosophical Society and the Natural History Society of Northumberland, Durham and Newcastle upon Tyne (now the Natural History Society of Northumbria). Buddle became a major influence on the Durham and Northumberland Coalfield, "the King of the Coal Trade". In 1816, Buddle devised a system of diverting underground ventilating currents that is in use today. He did not live to see the impact of his legacy, as he died in 1843, nine years before the founding of the institute. His papers and 'place books' were deposited at the institute.

Following an explosion at Felling in 1812, the Sunderland Society was set up to improve safety where gas was present in mines. The committee secured the services of Sir Humphry Davy, inventor of the safety lamp, in 1815. Despite changes, explosions continued, culminating in a devastating explosion at St Hilda Colliery in which 52 persons were killed. The South Shields Committee recommended the introduction of government inspections of mines the education of mechanical engineers, leading to the Coal Mines Inspection Act 1850 (13 & 14 Vict. c. 100). A coroner's court held at the Mill Inn at Seaham in 1852 suggested it would be advantageous to form a society to consider the prevention of accidents in coal mines.

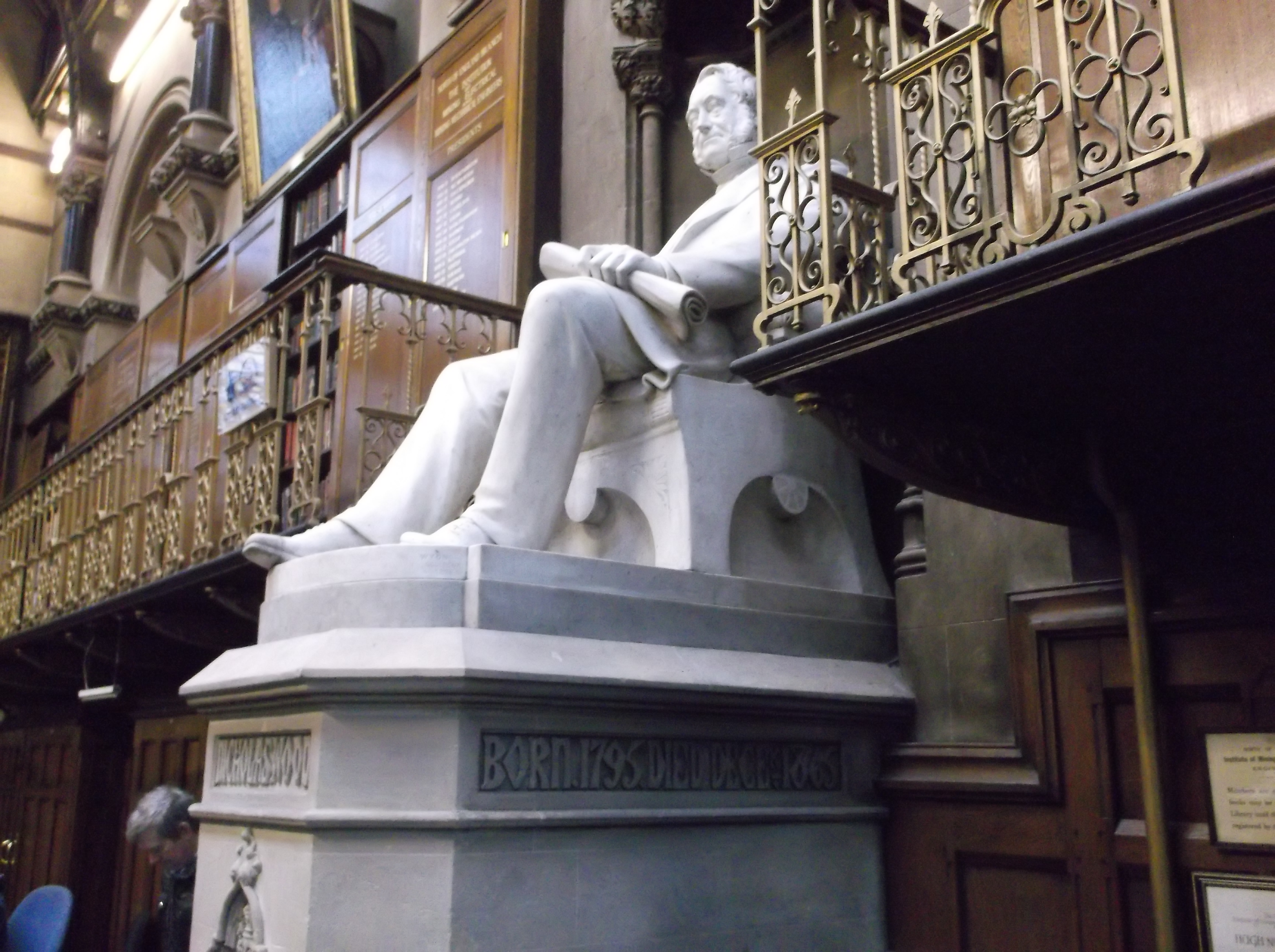
Nicholas Wood statue in the Wood Memorial Hall

At a meeting of “colliery owners, viewers, and others interested in the Coal Trade” on 3 July 1852, it was proposed to form a society to discuss the ventilation of coalmines, prevention of accidents and other items connected with the general working of coalmines. It was to be called "The North of England Society for the Prevention of Accidents and for other purposes connected with mining", and Nicholas Wood would be chairman. The title actually adopted was the North of England Institute of Mining Engineers, changed in 1870 to North of England Institute of Mining and Mechanical Engineers. A committee was appointed to draw up rules and the inaugural meeting was held on 3 September 1852 at which Wood delivered the inaugural address at the lecture theatre of the Literary and Philosophical Society. In this address he gave the aims of the Institute:

First, - By a union or concentration of professional experience, to endeavour if possible, to devise measures which may avert or alleviate those dreadful calamities, which have so frequently produced such destruction to life and property, and which are always attended with such misery and distress to the mining population of the district; and Secondly, - to establish a Literary Institution, more particularly applicable to the theory, art, and practice of Mining, than the Institutions in the locality present, or which are within the reach of the profession in this locality.

— Nicholas Wood, Inaugural Address, printed in the Transactions of the North of England Institute of Mining Engineers

Wood was president from the institute's inauguration in 1852 until 19 December 1865 when he died aged 70.

A Royal Charter was awarded by Queen Victoria incorporating the Institute in the 28th of November 1876.

A School of Medicine founded in 1834, a predecessor of Newcastle University, occupied the site the institute was built on. It was in this building part of the 1838 British Association meeting was held. The College of Physical Science in Newcastle, linked to Durham University, was founded in 1871 following some years of discussion and promotion by the institute. Its classes were taught in the institute's lecture theatre. It was renamed Armstrong College and was for many decades part of the University of Durham, later to become Kings College and then Newcastle University.

Similar institutions to the Institute were set up in other parts of Britain and informal collaboration led to the creation in 1889 of the Federated Institution of Mining Engineers, comprising NEIMME; Chesterfield and Midland Counties Institution of Engineers; Midland Institute of Mining, Civil and Mechanical Engineers; South Staffordshire and East Worcestershire Institute of Mining Engineers and later the North Staffordshire Institute of Mining and Mechanical Engineers, the Mining Institute of Scotland and the Manchester Geological and Mining Society. The name was changed to the Institution of Mining Engineers in 1898. The constituent societies kept their identity within the national Institution and many, like NEIMME, exist today as local societies of the Institute of Materials, Minerals and Mining.

=== Twentieth century ===
Historically the institute was concerned not just with measures to reduce accidents, but with the theory, art and practice of mining in general. So through meetings, presentation, discussion and publication of research papers, investigations, experimental work, and so on, the Institute tried to fulfil these aims. Working groups were set up, for example on tail ropes; flameless explosives; mechanical ventilators and mechanical coal cutting. There were research committees on such as strata control, set up in 1924 and safety in mines reporting, for example on horse haulage. In the 1900s there was also collaboration with Armstrong/Kings College in areas such as ventilation and mine lighting. The institute also worked with National Coal Board committees such as the Divisional Strata Control Research Committee.

=== The Common Room of the Great North ===
During the later 20th Century NEIMME's role and importance declined as the coal industry changed and shrank in size. Its finances became precarious and by the beginning of the 21st Century its continued existence was in doubt. A working group of the Institute concluded that a widening of its role was needed and suggested it used its heritage and collections as a basis for a programme of training, conference, debates, etc. about the future engineering, cultural, infrastructure and so on of the North East. A working title for the new body was the Great North Institute. Heritage Lottery grants enabled the development of the ideas and the creation of a new charity and limited company now named The Common Room of the Great North. and then funded extensive refurbishment of the building. The building now has various spaces for events, family activities, lectures, meetings, weddings and other celebrations. Neville Hall and the NEIMME Library collections - books, journals, reports, maps, photographs, archives, etc. - all legally transferred to The Common Room on 1 March 2019. There is a continuing digitisation programme of archives and other resources in the collection and a process to provide online access to digitised material is being developed.

=== A rejuvenated institute (2020 onwards) ===
For its 170th anniversary the institute developed a new strategy to rejuvenate itself and take it forward to its 180th in 2023. New collaborations with IOM3, the Geological Society, the Institute of Corrosion, IMechE, ICE, IET, IFE, as well as the IMarEst and RINA were forged leading to a series of conferences on 'Northern Energy Transitions Conference' with the Durham Energy Institute and the 'Legacies of Mineral Extraction and Sustainability Opportunities' conferences in 2021, the 2023 'Integrity Engineering for a Sustainable Future' conference joint with the Institute of Corrosion, and the 2024 'Supporting the Future of Northern Semiconductor Industries' with the North East Advanced Materials Electronics cluster.

The Institute now offers small grants to members to help them undertake professional development activities, and alongside the Midlands Institute of Mining Engineers jointly awards the Tunnicliffe Medal which recognises the achievement of Early Career Engineers. It supports engineers, scientists and technicians through its CPD events and Early Career Group, as well as offering mentoring opportunities to support Professional Chartership. The Institute continues to produce publications, with the 2023 publication on new archaeological evidence from the Willington Waggonway which presents an alternative view of the history of railways from the traditional one which begins with George Stephenson and the Stockton and Darlington Railway.

== Institute building ==
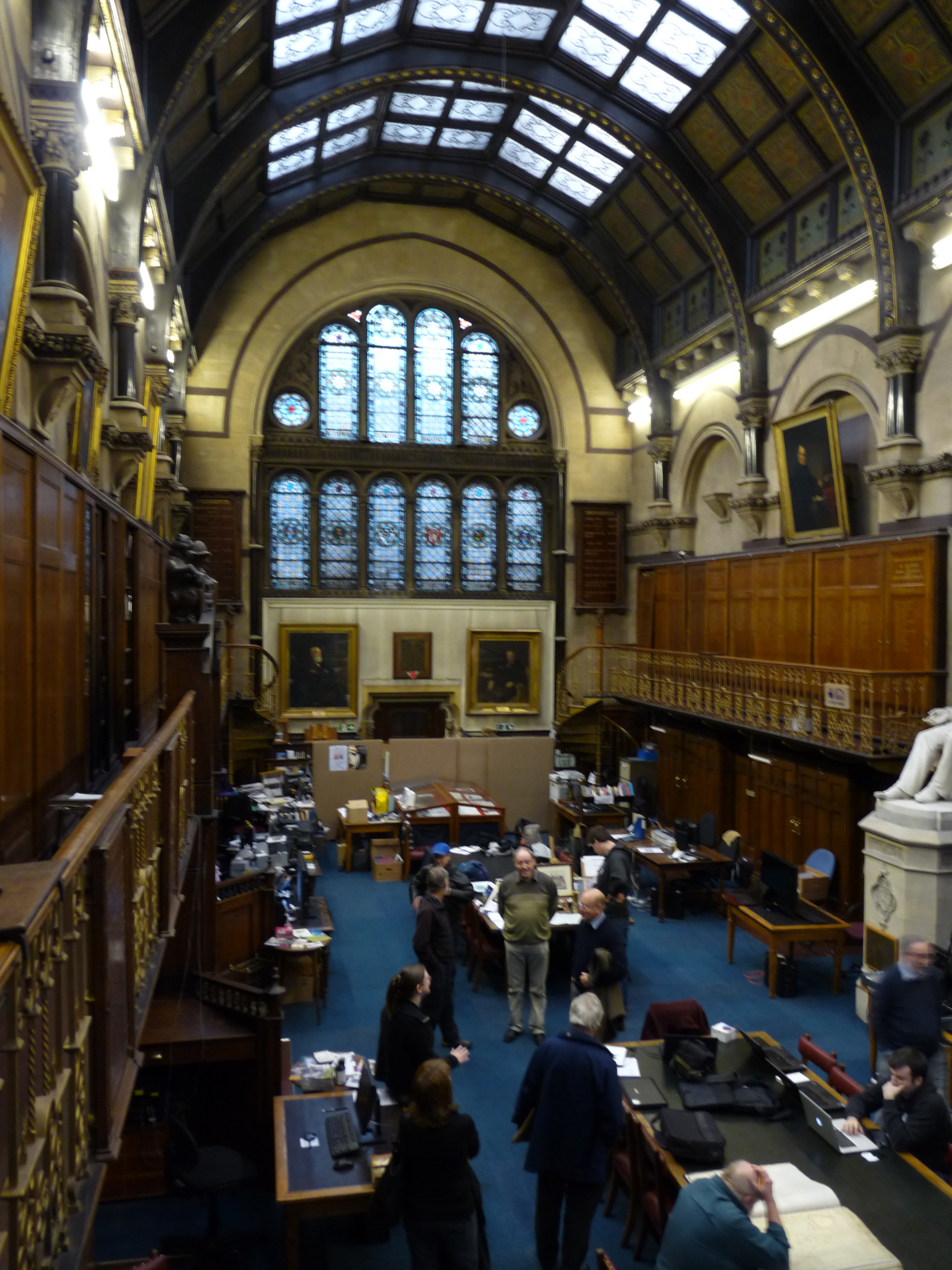
Inside the Wood Memorial Hall

In early years meetings of the Institute were held in the Literary and Philosophical Society and other local premises, but the need for its own building became apparent. Robert Stephenson, son of George Stephenson, a colleague and contemporary of Nicholas Wood, was his pupil at Killingworth Colliery and when Robert Stephenson died in October 1859 he left £2000 to the Institute which started a fund to build its permanent home. In 1867 plans were made and the building constructed in 1869–72 in Grainger's new town on the site of the medical school on land traditionally held by the Dukes of Westmorland, the Nevilles. It comprises the Wood Memorial Hall containing the Library, lecture theatre and other small rooms and Neville Hall which was primarily office space that from the beginning until recently was let to various mining and other organisations, such as the Coal Trade Association, Blyth and Tyne Railway, Freemasons and the Law Society.

The architect was Archibald Matthias Dunn, whose father, mining engineer and Mines Inspector Matthias Dunn, had been present at the institute's inaugural meeting. It was built at the height of the English Gothic Revival and shows a mixture of gothic and Tyneside Classical themes. The Library has high windows and a sky lit barrel-vaulted ceiling - the highest point 39 ft above the floor - with stained glass windows by Cooke of London. It includes a monumental statue of Nicholas Wood mounted on a throne in the setting of an iconstasis. There are other works of art including marble busts of John Buddle and Thomas Forster, the institute's second president and a carving of the River God Tyne including the Institute motto Moneo et munio - I advise and I protect. The original lecture theatre was replaced by the current one in 1902 designed by local architects Cackett and Burns Dick, and modelled on that at the Royal Institution in London. It features a steep rake of seating constructed from Cuban mahogany and the walls display portraits of all the institute's Presidents since 1852.

== Activities ==
=== Membership and postnominals ===
The institute is a Royal Chartered membership organisation with members drawn from local industry and academia. The institute has particularly good links with Durham and Newcastle Universities and with the local geotechnical industry. The Institutes' higher membership grades are judged upon academic and professional achievements, with unqualified but interested members of the public able to join in the lower category. The membership grades are:

- Student
- Affiliate
- Associate
- Member (MNEIMME)
- Fellow (FNIEMME)

=== Professional and public lectures ===
The institute has a monthly series of public lectures public lectures on developments in science and technology. These lectures range in topic from current and historical mining projects, active industrial developments with speakers from manufacturing industries, and research talks given by local PhD students. The Institutes' Younger Members Group arranges lectures and events for under-35s.

The institute also arranges field trips to sites of geological and industrial interest for its members. Many of the Institutes' members have conducted research into the North Pennine Orefield with trips to mines and geological outcrops recorded in its Transactions since the late 1800s to the present day.

=== Partnerships with other organisations ===
The institute works with other learned and professional organisations to provide its members and the wider public with lectures and events across a range of disciplines. The institute is a 'local society' of the IOM3 and runs events promoting the study and research of materials science. The Institute holds an annual joint-lecture with the Geological Society of London on strategic geological topics, and has had links with the Society dating back to the 1800s when the British Association meeting was held in Newcastle. The institute also holds joint events with the Mineralogical Society of Great Britain and Ireland on applied mineralogy and petrology subjects, with the Stephenson Locomotive Society on industrial heritage and transport topics, as well as the Institute of Corrosion, and Institution of Civil Engineers.

== Library collections and publishing ==
The collections include books, statistical compendia, Mines Inspectors reports, journals, government committee reports, archives, tracts, maps, photographs, technical reports, artworks and there is a searchable catalogue. In recent years library material has been transferred to the Institute following the closure of institutions such as the NCB Coal Research Establishment at Stoke Orchard, the NCB Mining Research and Development Establishment at Bretby, the British Coal Utilisation Research Association and the Centre for Lifelong Learning at the University of Newcastle.

The institute regularly publishes articles in its online Transactions on topics ranging from mining engineering and industrial heritage, to materials science and industrial policy.

== Governance ==
The institute is governed by a Council - as dictated by the Royal Charter - comprising the President, two Vice Presidents, the Honorary Secretary, the Honorary Treasurer, the immediate three Past Presidents, and members elected from the membership. The current Council is composed of professional mining engineers and coal miners from the North East collieries as well as representatives from the local geotechnical industry, academics from Durham University, industrial historians, and active exploration geologists.

== Other uses of the building ==
In recent years the main hall of the institute has also been used as a 100-capacity music venue, predominantly by local bands. The space has been described as "brilliantly atmospheric", and "an intimate setting for live music". The Mining Institute has also been used as a venue for Home Gathering Festival and is also available for conferences and weddings. The Institute building was closed for refurbishment but reopened in July 2021.

== Gallery ==
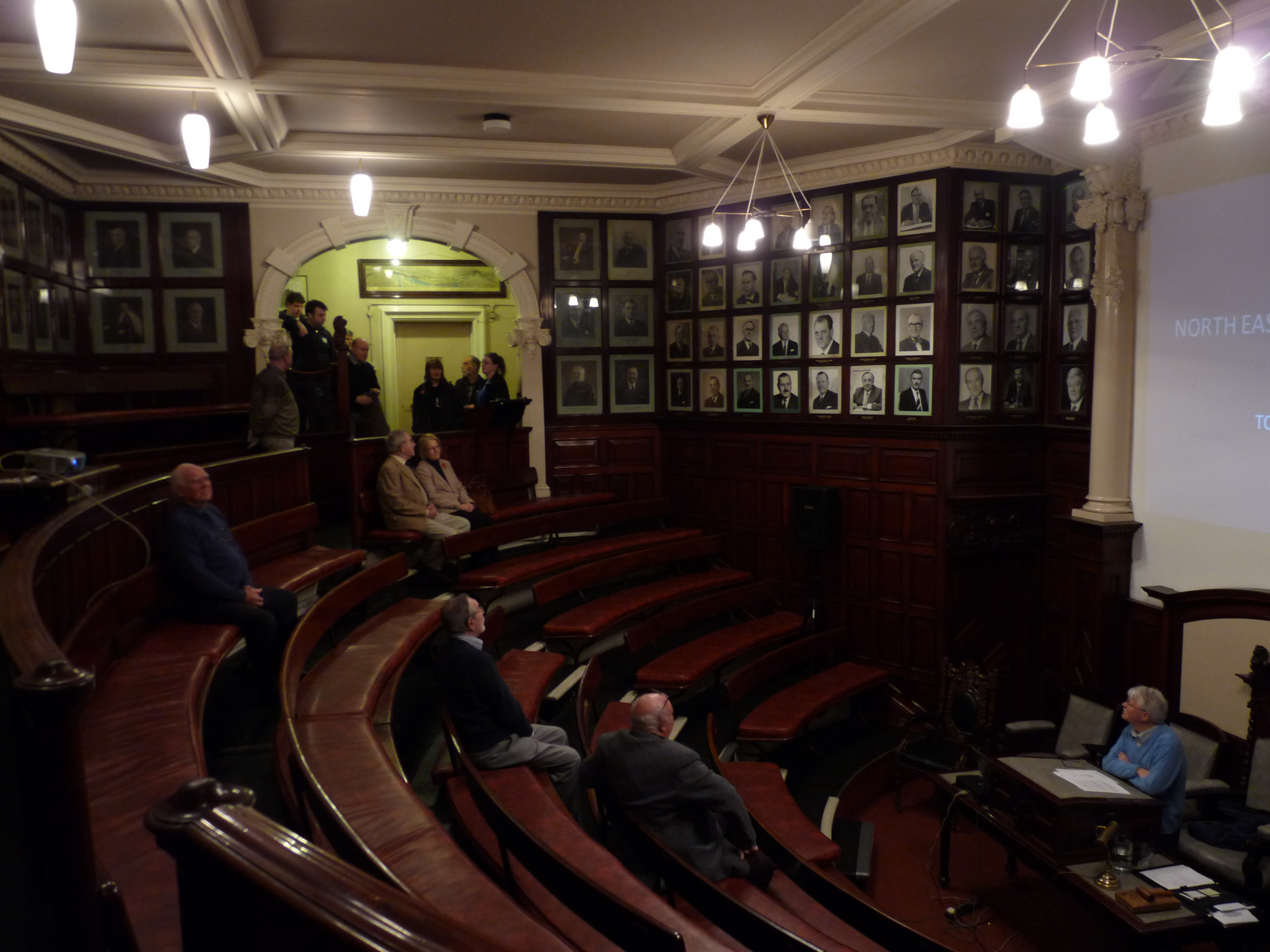
The lecture theatre

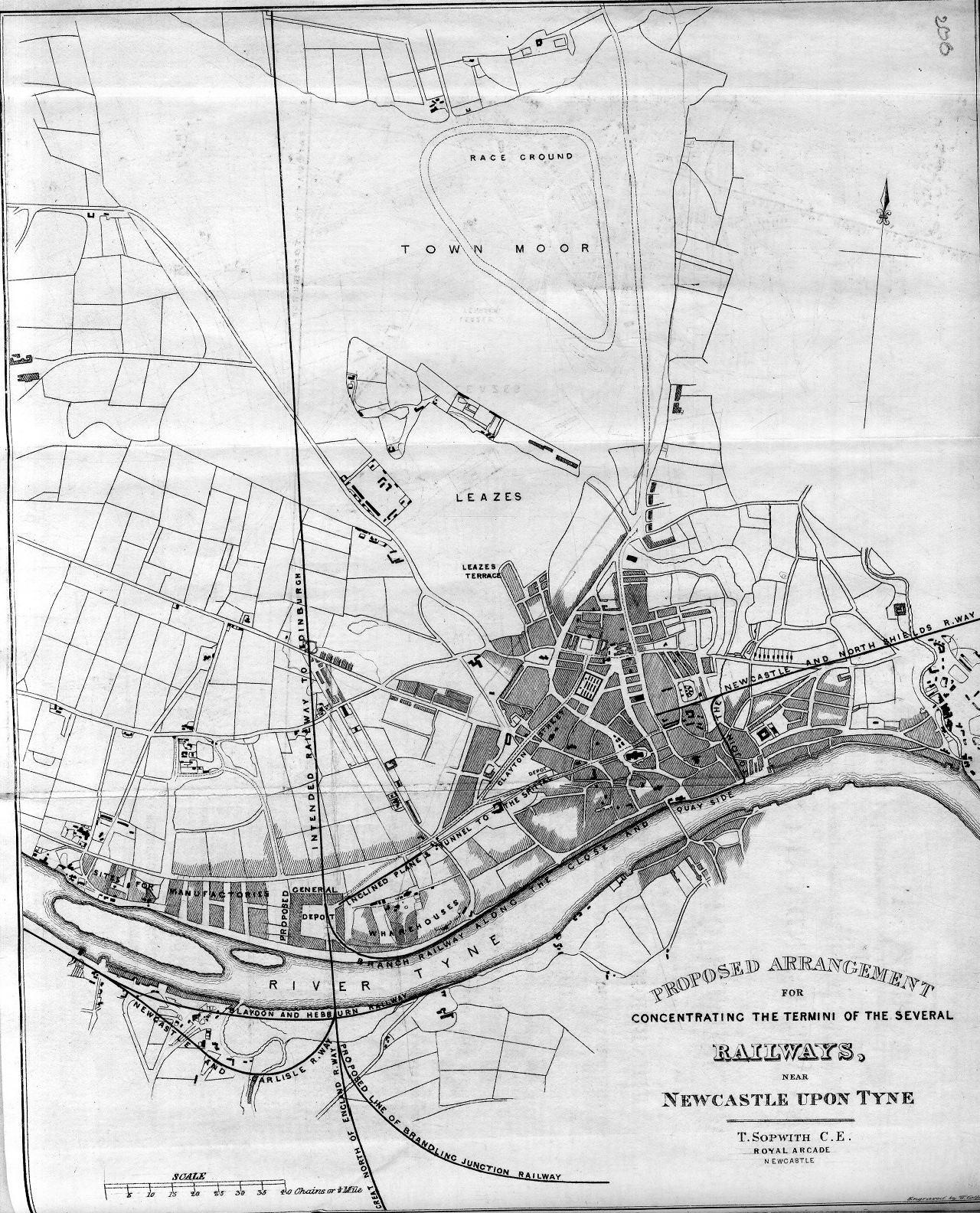
Richard Grainger's 1836 proposal for a Central Railway Depot

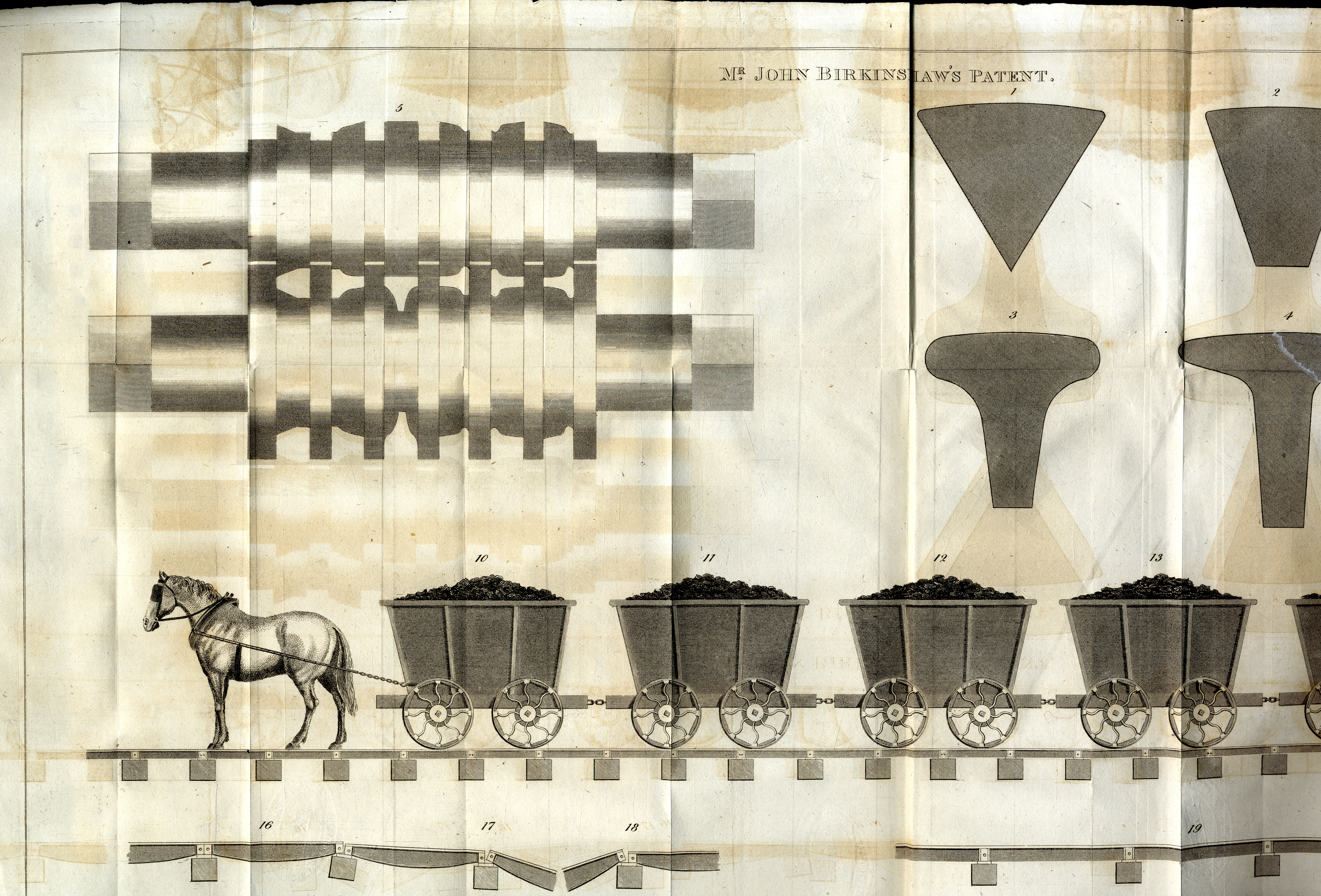
Birkinshaw's patent malleable iron rails

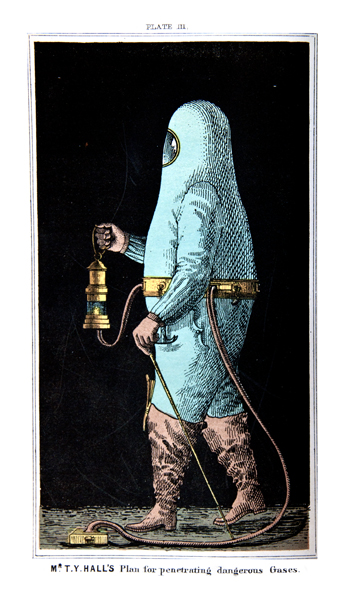
Thomas Young Hall's system for penetrating dangerous gases 1853

== Notable members ==
- William George Armstrong (1810–1900)
- Sir Lowthian Bell (1816–1904)
- Henry Bolckow (1806–1878)
- Edward Fenwick Boyd (1810–1889)
- Thomas Douglas (engineer) (1829–1920)
- Matthias Dunn (1788–1869)
- George Elliot (1814–1893)
- Thomas Emerson Forster (1802–1875)
- Robert Galloway (1844–1908)
- George Clementson Greenwell (1821–1900)
- Thomas Young Hall (1802–1870)
- Henry Richard Hancock (1836–1919)
- Frederick Gilberts King (1866–1920)
- Andrew Leslie (1818–1894)
- John Marley (1823–1891)
- George May (colliery agent) (1839–1915)
- Charles Merz (1874–1940)
- Charles Mitchell (1820–1895)
- Charles Palmer (1822–1907)
- Charles Parsons (1854–1931)
- Sir Richard Redmayne (1865–1955)
- John Wigham Richardson (1837–1908)
- Addison Langhorne Steavenson (1836–1913)
- Robert Stephenson (1803–1859)
- Nicholas Wood (1795–1865)

== Presidents ==
The President of the North of England Institute of Mining and Mechanical Engineers chairs the Council of the North of England Institute of Mining and Mechanical Engineers (NEIMME) and its formal meetings.

The first president was Nicholas Wood in 1852. Since then the post has been held by many distinguished engineers, scientists and industrialists.

No.	Image	Name	Start year	End year	Profession	Note	Reference
1		Nicholas Wood FGS FRS	1852	1866	Colliery and steam locomotive engineer		
2		Thomas Emerson Forster	1866	1868	Mining Engineer		
3		Sir George Elliot, 1st Baronet	1868	1869	Coal Miner, MP		
4		Edward Fenwick Boyd	1869	1872			
5		William Armstrong, 1st Baron Armstrong	1872	1875			
6(a)		Sir Lindsay Wood	1875	1878	Managing director of Hetton Collieries, North Hetton Coal Company and Harton Coal Company	Also President of the Durham Coalowners’ Association	
7		George Clementson Greenwell	1878	1881	Mining Engineer		
8		George Baker Forster	1881	1884	Consulting Engineer		
9		John Daglish	1884	1886	Colliery Viewer		
10		Lowthian Bell	1886	1888	Metallurgist		
11		John Marley	1888	1890	Mining Engineer		
12		William Cochrane	1890	1891	Consulting Engineer		
13		John Bell Simpson	1891	1893	Mining Engineer		
14		Addison Langhorne Steavenson	1893	1894			
15		Thomas Douglas	1894	1896	Mining Engineer		
16		George May	1896	1898		Member of the Durham Coal Owner's Association	
17		William Armstrong	1898	1900	Mining Engineer		
18		John George Weeks	1900	1902	Mining Engineer	Vice-chairman of Northumberland Coal-owners’ Association	
6(b)		Sir Lindsay Wood	1902	1903			
19		William Outterson Wood	1903	1904	Mining Engineer		
20		Thomas Walter Benson	1904	1906	Mine Owner		
21		John Herman Merivale	1906	1908	Mining Engineer	Chair of Mining at the College of Physical Science. Awarded an honorary MA from Durham University in 1884	
22		Thomas Emerson Forster Jnr	1908	1910	Consulting Engineer	Rowed for Cambridge in the Boat Race	
23		Matthew William Parrington	1910	1912	Mining Engineer	Manager and Director of Wearmouth Colliery, Sunderland	
24		Col. William Cuthbert Blackett CBE	1912	1914	Mine Manager and Chief Engineer	During the First World War he commanded several territorial battalions and served in France in 1918 (being made a CBE).	
25		Thomas Young Greener	1914	1916	Mine Surveyor		
26		Frank Coulson	1916	1917	Shaft Sinker	Officer in the Volunteer Battalion of the Durham Light Infantry reaching the rank of Colonel	
27		John Simpson	1917	1919	Mine Manager		
28(a)		Col Sir Frank Robert Simpson	1919	1921	Mining Engineer	Pioneer of electrification of collieries and of adapting mechanized mining to thin seams. Commander and later Honorary Colonel of the 9th Durham Light Infantry	
29		Charles Catterall Leach	1921	1923	Mine Owner		
30		Samuel Hare	1923	1924	Mine Manager		
31		Philip Kirkup	1924	1925	Mining Engineer		
32		Arthur Morton Hedley	1925	1927	Consulting Mining Engineer		
33		Mark Ford	1927	1929	Mining Engineer		
34		Robert Simpson Anderson	1929	1931	Mine Agent		
35		William Cochran Carr	1931	1933			
36		Robert William Glass	1933	1934	Mine Manager		
37		Robert Simon Tate	1934	1935	Mining Engineer		
28(b)		Col Sir Frank Robert Simpson	1935	1936			
38		Frederick Peter Mills	1936	1937	Mine Manager	Chief Officer of the Durham & Northumberland Collieries Fire and Rescue Brigade	
39		Thomas Greenland Davies	1937	1938	Inspector of Mines		
40		George Raw	1938	1939	Mine Manager	Director of Weardale Coal & Coke Company, South Hetton Coal Company and Easington Coal Company.	
41		Richard James Weeks	1939	1940			
42		Stanley Walton-Brown	1940	1941			
43		Thomas Rossiter Ridpath	1941	1942			
44		Henry Edmund Blackburne Daniell	1942	1944			
45		Robert Wylie Anderson MC	1944	1946	Consulting Mine Engineer	In the First World War he served in the Tyne Electrical Engineers and was mentioned in despatches and awarded the Military Cross	
46		Arthur Walker	1946	1948			
47		Haswell Alder	1948	1950	Mine Manager		
48		Granville Poole	1950	1952	Inspector of Mines		
49		Alan Lothian Ford	1952	1954			
50		Donald Hindson	1954	1955			
51		Robert Williams	1955	1956		Awarded the G.C.Greenwell Medal in 1925 for “A survey of a mining field with special reference to metalliferous mines”	
52		Stanley Walton-Brown	1956	1957	Mining Engineer		
53		Edward Logan Johnston Potts	1957	1958	Mining Engineer		
54		Ross Scott McLaren	1958	1959	Mining Engineer	MBE in 1940 for war activities and OBE in 1964 for his work with the NCB	
55		William Welsh	1959	1960	Mining Engineer		
56		James Samuel Carson	1960	1961	Mining Engineer		
57		Samuel Walter Potts	1961	1963	Mining Engineer		
58		Norman Reginald Palmer	1963	1964	Mine Surveyor		
59		Walter Widdas	1964	1965	Inspector of Mines		
60		Charles Roy Knaggs	1965	1966	Mine Manager		
61		Herbert Youngs Robinson	1966	1967	Lecturer at Kings College, Durham University	MSc from Durham University in 1948 for a thesis entitled 'The examination and suggested treatment for the concentration of fluorspar ore mined in County Durham'	
62		William Stanley Foster	1967	1968	Mining Engineer		
63		Edward Eric Cleaver	1968	1969	Mine Manager		
64		John Trevor Harding	1969	1970	Mine Manager	In 1960 he was awarded the G.C.Greenwell Bronze Medal	
65		Robert Williams	1970	1971	Mine Surveyor & Manager		
66		Robert Gordon McKillup	1971	1972	Mine Manager		
67		Edward Charlton	1972	1973	Mining Engineer		
68		Charles Deamster Hornsby	1973	1974	Mine Manager	Educated at Sedbergh School and Durham University. In 1980 he was awarded the G.C.Greenwell Silver Medal for his paper on face mechanisation in the North East Area.	
69		Dr. William Hook	1974	1975	Chemist	PhD in 1936 for research on the coking process.	
70		Douglas Alfred Hall	1975	1976	Chemist		
71		Harry Burn	1976	1977	Mining Engineer		
72		Kenneth Kay	1977	1978	Mining Engineer		
73		Hugh Irwin	1978	1979			
74		Percy Blunt	1979	1980	Mine Manager	1962 he was awarded the MBE for gallantry for assisting in the rescue of a trapped miner the previous December when he was Acting Manager at Whitwell.	
75		George Anthony Hetherington	1980	1981	Mine Manager		
76		Michael Widdas	1981	1982	Mine Manager		
77		William Archibald Summers	1982	1983	Mine Engineer		
78		Ralph Blance	1983	1984			
79		Dr Robert John Fowell	1984	1985			
80		Francis Peter John Adams	1985	1986			
81		George Weatherburn Taylor	1986	1987			
82		John James Lormor	1987	1988			
83		Joseph Parkins	1988	1989			
84		Gordon Proctor	1989	1990			
85		Ralph Sanderson	1990	1991			
86		Derek Newton	1991	1992			
87		Dr Barrie Jones	1992	1993			
88		Thomas Parker Watson	1993	1994			
89		Robert Eric Collins	1994	1995			
90		Ian Smith	1995	1996			
91		David Williams	1996	1997			
92		John Ceiriog Hughes	1997	1998			
93		John Harry Humphries	1998	1999			
94		Norman William Jackson	1999	2000			
95		Dr Jan Popke Jacob Ketelaar	2000	2001			
96		Ian Waugh	2001	2002			
97		Gerard Huitson	2002	2003			
98		Prof Paul Lawrence Younger	2003	2004	Hydrogeologist		
99		William Edward Hindmarsh	2004	2005			
100(a)		John Thomas Crompton	2005	2006			
101		John Stuart Porthouse	2006	2007			
102		Dr David Charles Bell	2007	2008			
103		John Gerard McCabe	2008	2009			
104		Malcolm Richard Tilley	2009	2010			
105		William Hogarth Bell	2010	2012			
106(a)		Dr Frederick Wardle Smith	2012	2013			
100(b)		John Thomas Crompton	2013	2014			
107		Stephen Paul Davidson	2014	2015			
108		Catherine Miller	2015	2017			
106(b)		Dr Frederick Wardle Smith	2017	2020			
109		Steve Martin	2020				

== Main sources ==
- Harding, J. T. A history of the North of England Institute of Mining and Mechanical Engineers Mining Engineer 146 1986, 252–6
- Harding, J. T. A short history of the Institution of Mining Engineers' North of England Branch and the North of England Institute of Mining and Mechanical Engineers Mining engineer 148 1988–9, 356–358
- North of England Institute of Mining and Mechanical Engineers Centenary brochure, 1852-1952. 1952
- North of England Institute of Mining and Mechanical Engineers The Mining Institute Renaissance - Anniversary Celebrations 1852–2002. 2002.
- Wood, Sir L. Address [for NEIMME Jubilee] Transactions - North of England Institute of Mining and Mechanical Engineers 52 1902–03, 66–77; Transactions - Institution of Mining Engineers 24 1902–03, 68-79
