= Thomas Emerson Forster =

English mining engineer (1802–1875)

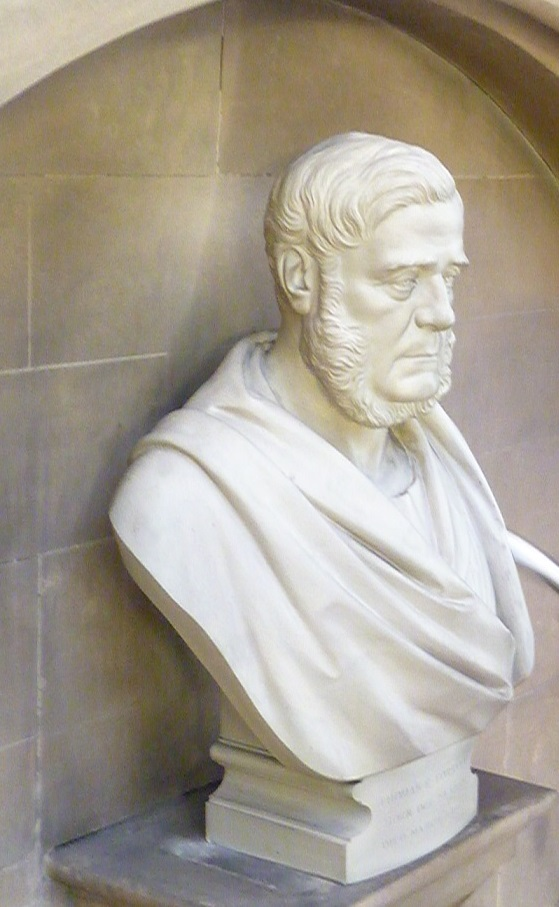
- Thomas Emerson Forster bust in The Mining Institute Newcastle Upon Tyne
- Born: 20 October 1802; Garrigill, Cumberland, England
- Died: 7 March 1875 (aged 72); Newcastle upon Tyne, England
- Occupation: Mining Engineer

Thomas Emerson Forster (20 October 1802 – 7 March 1875) was an English mining engineer.

== Early years ==
Thomas Emerson Forster was born on 20 October 1802 at Garrigill, a hamlet on the left bank of the South Tyne river in Cumberland. The district is called the Manor of Alston Moor. It was a mining area, with valuable lead mines and some small coal beds. Westgarth Forster, one of his father's cousins, published a book in 1816 called A section of the Strata from Cross Fell to Newcastle-on-Tyne. The family moved to Hebburn, near the mouth of the river Tyne, where Foster was educated. When he was fifteen he was apprenticed to Mr. Wade, one of the owners of Hebburn Colliery.

== Career ==
Thomas Forster learned from his relative, Westgarth Forster, and from John Buddle, head viewer of the colliery. When just over 20 years old he was appointed resident viewer at Walker Colliery near Wallsend, Northumberland. After two years he was given a senior position at Hetton Colliery, in the county of Durham. In 1831 he moved to Haswell, County Durham. Forster took an active role in planning and building the Durham and Sunderland Railway during the period when the old wooden wagon-ways were being replaced in the north of England. He became connected with various collieries including Belmont, Shincliffe, Shotton, Byers Green, and Scremerston. He was appointed Consulting Engineer to the Earl of Lonsdale, to Lord Boyne, and to other large mining property owners. He was associated with many of the most important mining works in the north of England.

Forster became a Member of the Institution of Civil Engineers on 16 February 1836.

In 1846 he moved to Ellison Place, Newcastle upon Tyne, where he spent the rest of his life. Thomas Forster taught his relative Thomas Forster Brown (1835–1907), also born in Garrigill, who became prominent in South Wales mining.

He was President of the North of England Institute of Mining and Mechanical Engineers from 1866 to 1869. In 1868 he was one of the local Commissioners of Inquiry into the Produce and profitable future Supply of Coal.

Thomas Emerson Forster died at Ellison Place on 7 March 1875 at the age of 72. His bust is displayed at the Neville Hall and Wood Memorial Hall (North of England Institute of Mining and Mechanical Engineers) in Newcastle upon Tyne. It is one of two busts, the other being of John Buddle. His son, George Baker Forster, also became a well-known mining engineer.

== Sources ==
- "Death Of Mr. Geo. Baker Forster". Shields Daily Gazette. 19 January 1901.
- "Mr. Thomas Emerson Forster". Minutes of the Proceedings of the Institution of Civil Engineers. ICE. 1875.
- "Neville Hall and Wood Memorial Hall, Newcastle upon Tyne". British Listed Buildings.
- "Thomas Forster Brown". Minutes of the Proceedings of the Institution of Civil Engineers. 172 (1908): 313–314. 1 January 1908. doi:10.1680/imotp.1908.17386.
