= Page Bank =

Village in Durham, England

Coordinates: 54.71397°N 1.63986°W

Page Bank is a village in County Durham, in England. It is situated on the north bank of the River Wear to the east of Willington and to the north-west of Spennymoor.
