= Joseph Curr =

Joseph Curr (1793 – 29 June 1847) was an English Roman Catholic priest and author who was called a "martyr of charity" for his work in Leeds in the typhus epidemic of 1847.

== Biography ==
The son of civil engineer John Curr and Hannah Curr (née Wilson), he was born in Sheffield on 14 April 1793, baptized by his godfather, Richard Rimmer, at the Catholic Chapel in Norfolk Row on 6 May. He had one brother, John, and six sisters.

Curr was educated at Crook Hall, County Durham, and in 1808 went to the seminary at Ushaw College. After being ordained he served in a number of different locations:

- Old St. Chad mission in Rook Street, Manchester (until 1820)
- St. Augustine mission in Granby Row, Manchester (1820–1822)
- Stockton-on-Tees (1822–1826)
- Ashton in Makerfield (1826–1830)
- La Trappe Abbey in France (1830-?)
- Ushaw (?-1833)
- Callaby Castle in Northumberland (1833–1837)
- Sheffield mission (1837–1839)
- St. Alban's mission, Blackburn (1839–1842)
- Whitby (1842–1846)

In 1847, St. Ann's in Leeds was suffering from a shortage of Catholic priests, due to an epidemic; Curr volunteered to serve there, where he died from typhus on 29 June 1847. He was buried at St. Patrick's on York road, along with the other four priests who died in the epidemic.

== Works ==
Curr was a prolific writer, particularly in his feud with the local Bible Association. Among his notable opponents were Melville Horne and William Roby, whom Curr debated on topics including his opposition to lay Christians reading and interpreting the Bible themselves.

His principal works include:

- A Discourse delivered at St. Augustine's Chapel, Manchester, at the funeral of the Rev. Rowland Broomhead
- The Instructor's Assistant
- Visits to the Blessed Sacrament and to the Blessed Virgin
- Spiritual Retreat (adapted from Bourdaloue)
- Familiar Instructions in the Faith and Morality of the Catholic Church
- A Letter to Sir Oswald Mosley, Baronet, President of the Manchester and Salford Auxiliary Bible Society
- An address to the Public occasioned by the recent letters of the Rev. Melville Home and the Rev. Nathaniel Gilbert on the subject of bible associations
- Catholicism: or the old rule of faith vindicated from the attack of W. Rob
