= Nicholas Wood =

English colliery and steam locomotive engineer (1795–1865)

Nicholas Wood FGS FRS
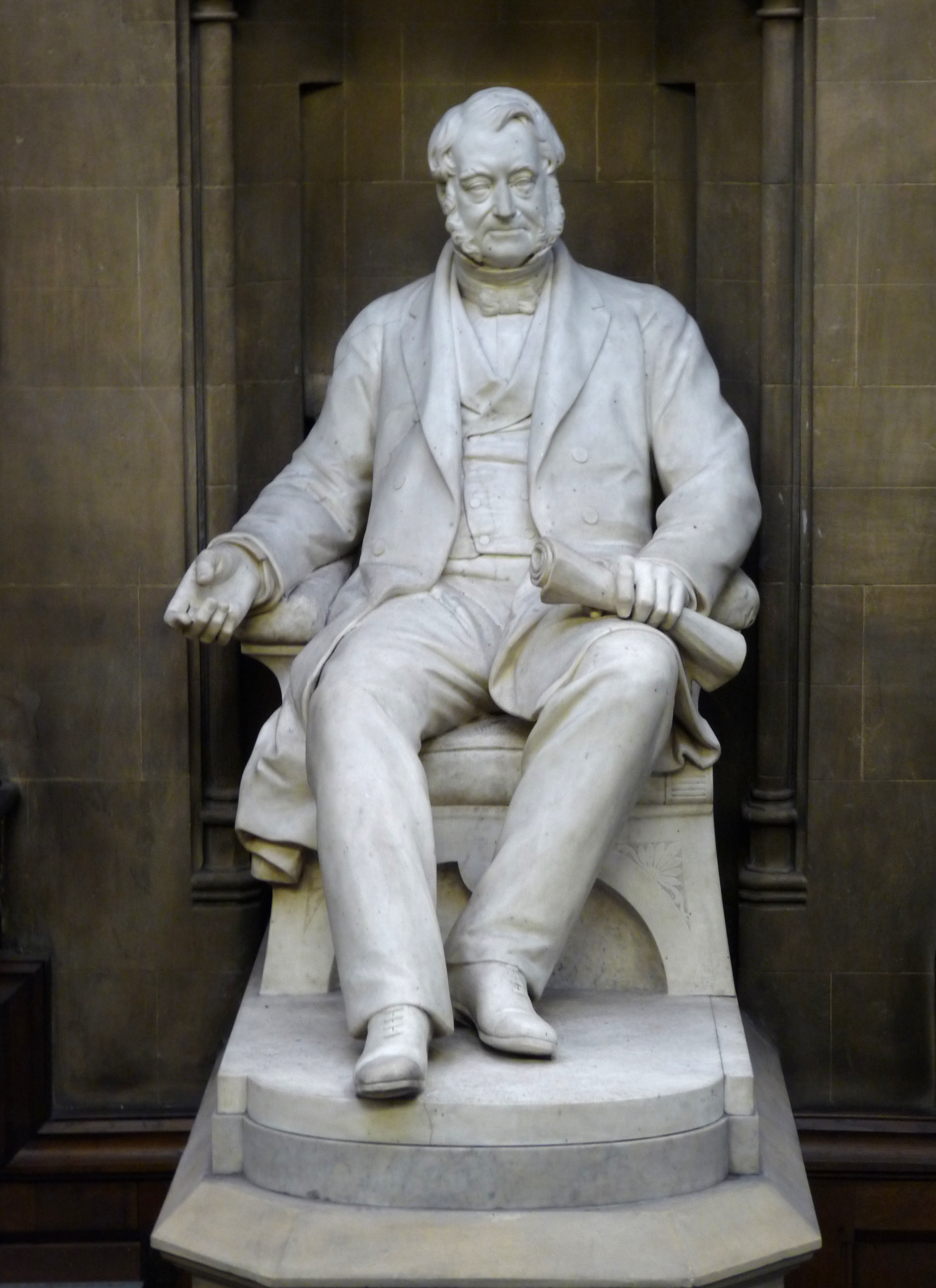
- The statue of Nicholas Wood in the library of The North of England Institute of Mining and Mechanical Engineers, Newcastle upon Tyne
- Born: 24 April 1795; Sourmires, Ryton, County Durham, England
- Died: 19 December 1865 (aged 70); London, England
- Resting place: Saint Nicholas Churchyard, Front Street, Hetton-le-Hole, County Durham, England
- Spouse: Maria Lindsay
- Children: 4 sons, including Nicholas Wood (MP) and Sir Lindsay Wood, 1st Baronet
- Parent(s): Nicholas Wood, Ann Wood (née Laws)
- Engineering career
- Discipline: Mining engineering, Locomotive engineering
- Institutions: North of England Institute of Mining and Mechanical Engineers (inaugural president)
- Projects: Newcastle and Berwick Railway
- Significant advance: Mining safety

Nicholas Wood FGS FRS (24 April 1795 – 19 December 1865) was an English colliery and steam locomotive engineer. He helped engineer and design many steps forward in both engineering and mining safety, and helped bring about the North of England Institute of Mining and Mechanical Engineers, holding the position of president from its inauguration to his death.

== Early life ==
Nicholas Wood was born at Sourmires, in the parish of Ryton, then in County Durham, the son of Nicholas and Ann (née Laws) Wood. Nicholas Senior was the mining engineer at Crawcrook colliery. Nicholas Junior attended the village school at Crawcrook and started work in 1811 at Killingworth Colliery as an apprentice colliery viewer under the guidance of Ralph Dodds. Wood eventually became the viewer, or colliery manager, of Killingworth Colliery in 1815. He was there a close associate of the colliery enginewright George Stephenson, helping him develop his version of the safety lamp and making considerable technical contributions to the development of his locomotive Blücher. Early in their career, George Stephenson began developing a revolutionary safety lamp, yet it was Wood, already an accomplished craftsmen, who made the drawing to which the "Geordie" lamp was made, under the supervision of the inventor. It was Nicholas Wood who actually designed the system of actuating the valves of Stephenson's Blücher with eccentrics added to the axle; most of the valve gears, including, ironically, the Stephenson Gear, were based on the use of eccentrics, however, not on the simple slip eccentrics of Wood. He also carried out in 1818 a series of experiments on rolling resistance, lubrication and laminated steel springs of locomotives. In 1823 he accompanied Stephenson to the meeting with Edward Pease in Darlington at which Pease was convinced to use locomotives on the Stockton and Darlington Railway and put Stephenson in charge of building it. Wood and Stephenson remained in close contact throughout their lives, and George Stephenson even sent his son, Robert Stephenson, to work as Wood's apprentice, where he flourished.

== Career ==
By 1825, he had gained sufficient reputation and expertise in the design and testing of locomotives that in 1825 he was able to publish his influential book A Practical Treatise on Rail-roads and Interior Communication, in which he analysed the various types of 'motive power' then in use: self-acting planes, fixed steam-engine planes, horses and steam locomotives. He was also invited to give evidence before committees of both houses of parliament on the Liverpool and Manchester Railway Bill and then appointed as one of the three judges, along with John Rastrick and John Kennedy, at the subsequent Rainhill Trials of 1829. He republished his book, considerably enlarged by reports and discussion of the trials, as a second edition in 1831. A third edition appeared in 1838.

In 1832, he was involved in the building of the Newcastle and Carlisle Railway and in 1845 became a director of the Newcastle and Berwick Railway. Wood was also given an opportunity to display his geological knowledge of Northumberland by giving a paper when the British Association for the Advancement of Science held its annual meeting in Newcastle in 1838. In 1844, Wood became a partner in the Hetton Coal Company that owned Hetton Colliery, and moved to Hetton Hall as colliery manager. He also was a partner in other local colliery companies - John Bowes and Partners and his own Nicholas Wood and Partners.

Wood often gave extensive evidence to government committees, such as the select committees on accidents of 1835 and 1853 and was involved in the discussions leading to the Coal Mines Inspection Act 1850. In 1855 he examined all the candidates for the new mining inspectorate.

== North of England Institute of Mining and Mechanical Engineers ==
Wood was one of the group of colliery viewers and others who following the Seaham Colliery explosion in 1852 decided to form a society to consider the prevention of accidents in coal mines. This was the North of England Institute of Mining Engineers. Wood was appointed the first President being re-elected to the position every year until his death. He campaigned for a College of Physical Science in Newcastle but without success because of funding difficulties and problems in the planned relationship with Durham University. A revitalised campaign after his death resulted in the creation of the college - a forerunner of Newcastle University - in 1871.

== Other organisations ==
Wood was a member of the Institution of Civil Engineers and Institution of Mechanical Engineers and became a Fellow of the Geological Society in 1843 and a Fellow of the Royal Society in 1864. He was a vice president of the British Association for the Advancement of Science at the time of its meeting in Newcastle in 1863. He also served as chairman of the employers organisation the Mining Association of Great Britain from its inception in 1854 until his death in 1865.

He married Maria Lindsay of Alnwick in 1827; they had four sons and three daughters. In declining health for some months, he died while visiting London for medical consultations on 19 December 1865. He was buried at Hetton. His four sons all made names for themselves in the coal industry; the youngest, Sir Lindsay Wood, becoming chairman of Hetton Collieries after his father's death and a baronet.

== Legacy ==
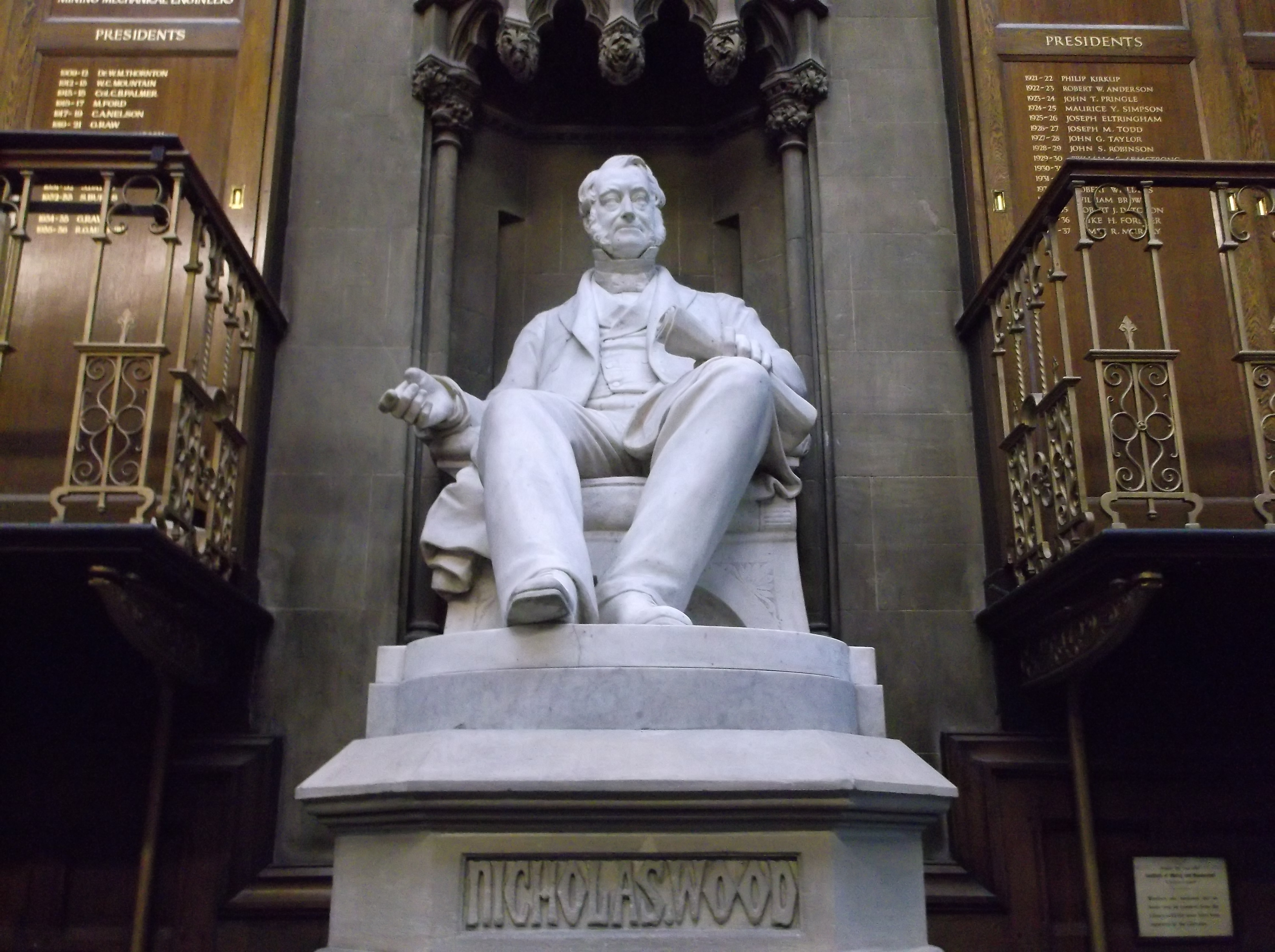
The statue to Nicolas Wood

In 1871, in honour of Nicholas Wood, the Neville Hall within the North of England Institute of Mining Mechanical Engineers was renamed the Wood Memorial Hall. Planned to open on 5 August 1871, on the nineteenth anniversary of its foundation, the opening was delayed, owing to the joiners being on strike for four months. The Hall was successfully reopened on 2 July 1872, and was considered by many of the members to be a worthy testimonial to the memory of Nicholas Wood. Within the building, there is a monumental statue of Nicholas Wood presiding over the library, mounted on the top of a throne in the setting of an iconostasis.

== Publications ==
=== Book ===
- Wood, Nicholas A Practical Treatise on Rail-roads and Interior Communication in General, 1825. 2nd ed. 1831; 3rd ed. 1838.

=== Selected articles ===
- Wood, Nicholas. On the geology of a part of Northumberland and Cumberland. Transactions - Natural History Society of Northumberland, Durham and Newcastle Upon Tyne 1831, 302-334
- Wood, Nicholas. Inaugural address delivered to the members of the North of England Institute of Mining Engineers...... Transactions - North of England Institute of Mining Engineers 1 1852-53, 11-33
- Wood, Nicholas. On safety-lamps for lighting coal mines. Transactions - North of England Institute of Mining Engineers 1 1852-53, 301-322
- Wood, Nicholas. On the conveyance of coals underground in pits. Transactions - North of England Institute of Mining Engineers 5 1856-57, 65–116
- Wood, Nicholas. On the improvements and progress in the working and ventilation of coal mines in the Newcastle-on-Tyne district within the last fifty years. Proceedings - Institution of Mechanical Engineers 1858, 177-236
- Wood, Nicholas. On the deposit of magnetic ironstone in Rosedale. Transactions - North of England Institute of Mining Engineers 7 1858-59, 85-94
- Wood, Nicholas. Address on the two late eminent engineers, the Messrs. Stephenson, father and son. Transactions - North of England Institute of Mining Engineers 8 1859-60, 33-84
- Wood, N., Taylor, J. & Marley, J. Coal mining, &c. Transactions - North of England Institute of Mining Engineers 12 1862-63, 149-218
