= John Buddle =

Mining engineer and entrepreneur

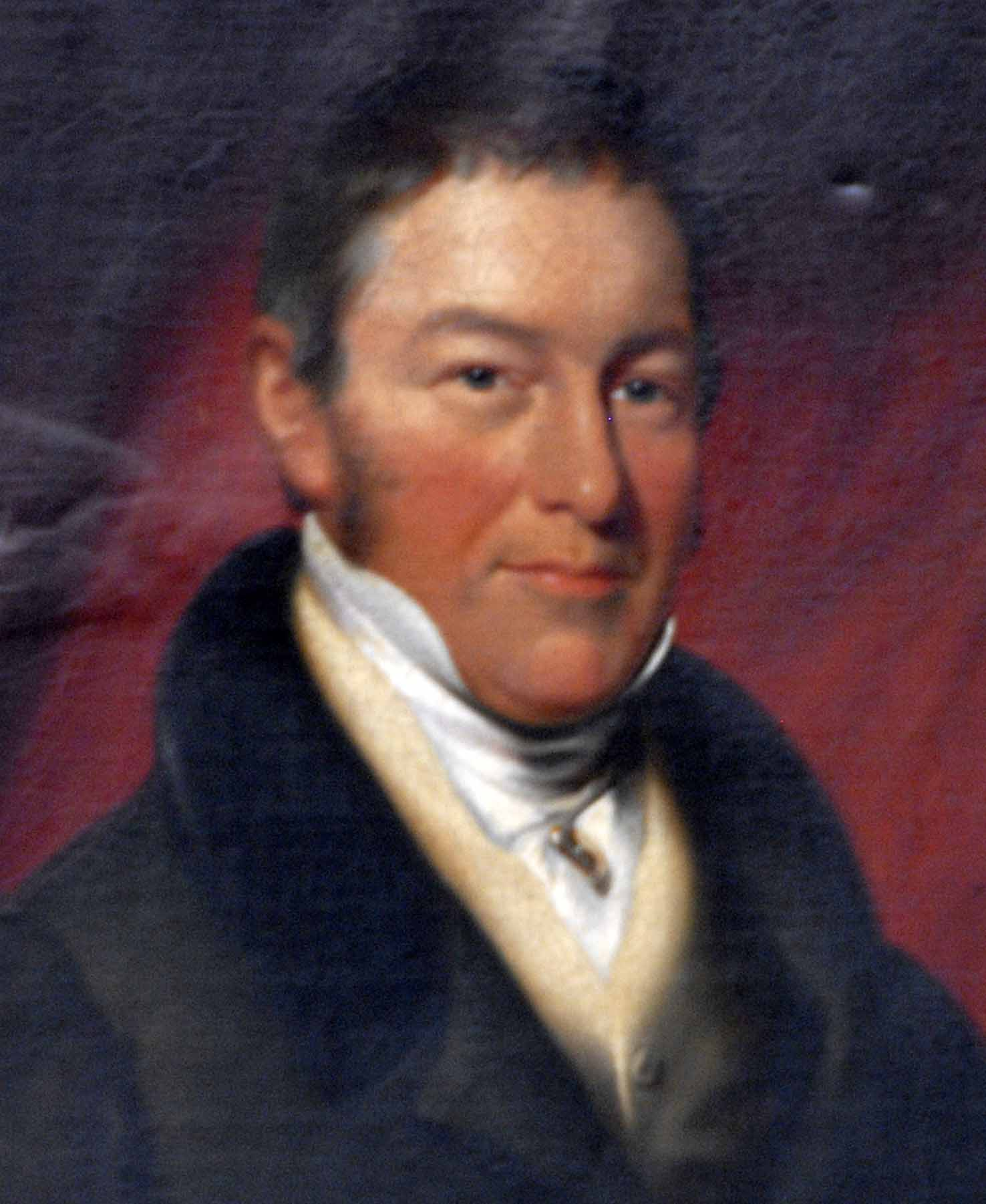
John Buddle 1773-1843. Original painting is in Neville Hall, Newcastle

John Buddle (15 September 1773 – 10 October 1843) was an English prominent self-made mining engineer and entrepreneur in North East England. He had a major influence on the development of the Great Northern Coalfield in the first half of the 19th century, contributing to the safety of mining coal by innovations such as the introduction of the Davy Lamp, the keeping of records of ventilation, and the prevention of flooding. He was also interested in shipping as an owner, and built Seaham Harbour, establishing an important trade dock. He was chairman of the company that built the Tyne Dock at South Shields, and was also involved in the creation of two harbours and the development of a tunnel.

== Early life ==
Born on 15 September 1773 at West Kyo, near Stanley, County Durham, Buddle was the only son and the fourth of six children born to John Buddle, senior, and Mary Reay. John Buddle senior was a mathematician who worked at a local school before pursuing a career in the mining industry, being responsible for his son's wide education, particularly in maths and science. One of his earliest notebooks resides in the collection of the North of England Institute of Mining and Mechanical Engineers in Newcastle upon Tyne, containing notes on a wide range of scientific and geographical topics. Buddle's father also gave him a practical education in mining, even as early, John Buddle commented as "six years old". At the age of 19, John Buddle became the underviewer to his father, and in 1801 he was appointed viewer of Benwell Colliery, soon buying a thirteenth share in the colliery worth £2,700, beginning his role as a Director with a salary of £100 a year.

== The Wallsend colliery ==
John Buddle followed his father into the profession of colliery viewer, a calling which he helped to develop towards the modern concept of a mining engineer. He succeeded his father as manager at Wallsend Colliery in 1806, though his work was not limited to just the local colliery. Buddle was involved with the introduction of the miners safety lamp invented by Humphry Davy being involved in the earliest discussions with Davy in August 1815 and providing "fire-damp" samples for experiments in Davy's London Laboratory.

The moment when Buddle tested the new Davy safety lamp for the first time, for real, in Northeast England, is recorded by him in a report to the Select Committee on Accidents in Mines on 4 September 1835 "I first tried the lamp in an explosive mixture on the surface; and then took it to the mine; it is impossible for me to express my feelings at the time when I first suspended the lamp in the mine and saw it red hot. I said to those around me: 'We have at last subdued this monster [fire-damp].'" This is a record of one of the most significant moments in the industrialization of the World.

John Buddle was a member of the Sunderland Society, set up to investigate colliery safety, and in this connection made scientific investigations into mine ventilation and advocated the keeping of proper records. The most important appointment, however, came when Buddle was appointed as General Manager to Charles Vane, 3rd Marquess of Londonderry. Londonderry had married a wealthy heiress, said to be the wealthiest woman in Britain, Lady Frances Anne Vane Tempest, and thus came to run her Durham collieries. Together, Londonderry and Buddle embarked on a project to develop a Port at Seaham, intending to bypass the Tyne and Wear monopolies. The building of the port began in 1828, and would not be finished until fifteen years later, in which the first shipment of coal was sent out on Buddle's personal ship, Lord Seaham. He even saw through much of the development of the town, his influence being so great that, when his sister Ann died, the ships dressed in black and the shops closed as a matter of respect. He also represented the Marquess on the committee of coalowners who regulated the North East coal trade with London. Although he was mostly active in the Great North Coalfield, the records show Buddle took on work all over Britain, including matters in Portugal, South America, Russia and Nova Scotia. Two of his latest colliery appointments were in 1837 when he became the owner of West Towneley Colliery and also the viewer to the Bishop of Durham- a post previously held by his Father.

In collaboration with William Chapman, Buddle is also considered to have designed the pioneering locomotive Steam Elephant for Wallsend Colliery and an eight-wheeled geared engine for the Lambton Waggonway.

Buddle was a coalowner in his own right as well as a viewer and practical manager for many pits in the region of the rivers Tyne and Wear, and his advice was sought on both mining and railways from as far afield as Nova Scotia.

Buddle was an active member of Newcastle society, and held numerous positions in his lifetime. In 1838, he was elected vice-president of the prestigious Literary and Philosophical Society and also became vice- president of the North of England Fine Arts Society. In 1842 he was appointed as Steward for Northumberland at the Newcastle Infirmary, a position which allowed him to appoint physicians to the hospital, and, due to his interest in theatre, he was Chairman of the committee for the new theatre in the 1830s, and he personally designed the heating system for the Theatre Royal. Throughout his life, Buddle donated money to numerous causes, including one to relieve the poverty of seamen employed in the Northern Whale Fishery, the benefit of widows and orphans of mining disasters, and the erection of Penshaw monument in memory of his friend John George Lambton, first Earl of Durham.

== Death ==
A Unitarian, Buddle died unmarried at his home in Wallsend in 1843, after becoming ill after riding with Lord Londonderry to inspect the collieries. He left a personal fortune of around £150,000; mostly to his nephew Robert Thomas Atkinson who died less than two years later and his brother-in-law Thomas Burnett, as well as some distribution amongst his other nephews & nieces and some annuities to a number of other relatives and friends. They are both buried at St James' Churchyard, Benwell, along with Robert's aunt. When Buddle died, his funeral procession was over a mile long and took over three hours to travel from his home in Wallsend to his resting place in Benwell. The number of mourners was so great that, according to one contemporary newspaper report, "so large a concourse of people was perhaps never before assembled in Newcastle on such a mournful occasion". The long list of pall-bearers and principal mourners included many of the most rich and powerful men in Newcastle, such as local councillor and wealthy corn merchant William Armstrong and his son, also William, who was just a few years away from setting up his great engineering works on the banks of the Tyne in Elswick.

Buddle's bust is displayed at the Neville Hall and Wood Memorial Hall in Newcastle upon Tyne. It is one of two busts, the other being of Thomas Emerson Forster.

== See also ==
- Northeast England
- Humphry Davy
- Charles Vane, 3rd Marquess of Londonderry
- Limitation of the Vend
- North of England Institute of Mining and Mechanical Engineers
