= William Hawes =

William Hawes may refer to:

- William Hawes (composer) (1785–1846), English musician and composer
- William Hawes (Trinity) (1620–1659), English academic at Trinity College, Oxford
- William Hawes (physician) (1736–1808), English founder of the Royal Humane Society
- William Hawes (miller) (1772–?), American miller, member of the Maine House of Representatives
- William Hawes (1805–1885), English businessperson and reformer, grandson of the physician
