= John Badcock =

John Badcock may refer to:

- John Badcock (rower) (1903–1976), British Olympic rower
- John Badcock (artist) (born 1952), New Zealand artist
- John Badcock (cricketer) (1883–1940), Hampshire cricketer
- John Badcock (writer), unidentified English sporting writer who published between 1816 and 1830
