= Russell Scott (disambiguation) =

Russell Scott (1921–2012) was an American clown, television personality, and presenter.

Russell Scott may also refer to:

- Russell Scott (boxer) (1917–1980), American boxer
- Russell Scott (civil servant) (1877–1960), British civil servant
- Russell Scott (minister) (1760–1834), English Unitarian minister
- Russell Scott (merchant) (1801–1880), English businessman, son of the minister
- Russell T. Scott Jr. (1938–2024), American classicist and ancient historian

== See also ==
- Russell Scott Riggs (born 1971), American stock car racing driver
- Russell Scott Valentino, American literary scholar, translator, author, and editor
