= James Ford =

James Ford may refer to:

== Sportspeople ==
- James Ford (American football) (born 1949), American football player
- Jamie Ford (cricketer) (born 1976), English cricketer
- James Ford (cricketer, born 1836) (1836–1877), English cricketer
- James Ford (footballer) (born 1981), English footballer for Bournemouth
- James Ford (rugby league) (born 1982), English rugby league footballer
- James Ford (soccer) (1889–?), American soccer player
- Jim Ford (rugby union) (1869–1935), Scottish rugby union player
- Jimmy Ford (1912–1982), American Negro leagues baseball player

== Characters ==
- James Ford (One Life to Live), a fictional character from the ABC soap opera One Life to Live
- James "Sawyer" Ford, a fictional character from the ABC program Lost

== Others ==
- James Ford (actor) (1903–1977), American actor in silent and sound films
- James Ford (antiquary) (1779–1850), benefactor of the Ford Lectures at Oxford University
- James Ford (musician) (born 1978), British producer and DJ; member of Simian Mobile Disco
- James Ford (Pennsylvania politician) (1783–1859), U.S. Congressman
- James Ford (pirate) (c. 1770–1833), American pirate and civic leader
- James Ford (translator) (1797–1877), English cleric and Dante translator
- James A. Ford (1911–1968), American archaeologist
- James Hobart Ford (1829–1867), Union general during the American Civil War and Indian Wars
- James D. Ford (c. 1930–2001), American clergyman
- James Ishmael Ford (born 1948), American Zen Buddhist priest and Unitarian Universalist minister
- James R. Ford (1925–2017), American educator, politician, businessman and community activist
- James Robert Ford (born 1980), British web and installation artist
- James W. Ford (1893–1957), African American politician and Communist vice presidential candidate
- James Allan Ford (1920–2009), Scottish writer, soldier and civil servant
- J. D. Ford (born 1982), American politician
- Jim Ford (actor) (born 1981), American actor, stuntman, screenwriter and film director
- Jim Ford (singer-songwriter) (1941–2007), American singer-songwriter

== See also ==
- Jamie Ford (born 1968), American author
- John-James Ford (born 1972), writer
- James Forde (born 1996), actor
- Jim Ford Challenge Cup, a National Hunt Listed chase in England
