= A Layman =

A Layman is a pen-name used by:

- Thomas Hughes
- Sir Walter Scott
