= Frederick Doulton =

British politician

Frederick Doulton (1824–1872) was a British Liberal Party politician. He was Member of Parliament for Lambeth from 5 May 1862 until 1868.

== Biography ==
Frederick was the third of eight children of John Doulton (1793–1873), the founder of Royal Doulton ceramics, and Jane Duneau. He is the brother of Sir Henry Doulton who took the leading role in the family business and establishing it as a significant concern. Frederick married Sarah Merideth in 1846. Frederick worked in the family business and as an appointed member of the Metropolitan Board of Works, the then principal instrument of London-wide government, raising some suspicion of his own interests. He died of apoplexy at Summerhill House, Tunbridge Wells on 21 May 1872, and was brought to West Norwood Cemetery for burial in his father's plot.

== Parliamentary career ==
Frederick had first stood unsuccessfully for Lambeth in 1852 where he had adopted a platform critical of lavish campaigns and corrupt and unfair voting. Surprisingly, in 1857, he stood aside to nominate and support the candidature of William Roupell, a vain and shallow candidate who indulged in exorbitant campaigning and entertaining of electors. Doulton was alleged to have written Roupell's speeches though he denied as much. Doulton was further implicated with Roupell in allegations of excessive spending though these were later dropped when the accusers were in turn accused of applying duress to Roupell for political favours. Roupell was duly elected.

At the 1859 United Kingdom general election, two members were to be returned and William Williams, who had held the second seat since 1850, announced in The Times that he would not stand because of ill health. Doulton announced his candidacy but a rumour started to circulate that he had bribed Williams to stand down. Williams now decided to stand to preserve his reputation and Roupell, somewhat disloyally, backed him. Doulton now withdrew but seems to have made light of the matter.

In 1862, Roupell was consumed by the scandal that gave rise to the Roupell case and resigned as MP on 4 February. Doulton was later returned as MP in the by-election on 5 May. His Parliamentary career also ended with scandal six years later. The Times obituary ends with:

but [Frederick Doulton] did not offer himself again to his old constituents in 1868, for reasons which, no doubt, are fresh in the minds of the public.

This refers to the Affaire Doulton described in The Times on 4 January 1869. Frederick Doulton was accused of fraud in Brussels, but escaped the charges on appeal since overcharging was not a crime. His reputation, though, was damaged.

== Bibliography ==
- Clement, A. J. (2004). Doulton, Sir Henry (1820–1897). Oxford Dictionary of National Biography. (subscription, Wikipedia Library access or UK public library membership required)
- Harris, J. (2001). The Roupells of Lambeth. London: The Streatham Society. ISBN 1-873520-37-9.
- Hill, G. (1879). The Electoral History of the Borough of Lambeth since its Enfranchisement in 1832. London: Stanford.

Parliament of the United Kingdom
Preceded by William Roupell; William Williams	Member of Parliament for Lambeth; 1862 – 1868; With: William Williams to 1865; James Lawrence 1865; Thomas Hughes 1865–1868	Succeeded by James Lawrence; William McArthur
