= William Roupell =

British politician

William Roupell (7 April 1831 – 25 March 1909) was Liberal Party Member of Parliament of the United Kingdom for Lambeth from 1857 until his resignation on 4 February 1862. A forger and a fraudster, he was ruined in the Roupell case.

== Early life ==
William was the illegitimate son of Richard Palmer Roupell (1782–1856), scrap-metal dealer and property developer, and Sarah Crane (1796–1878), daughter of Thomas, a carpenter. William had an elder brother, John, and two younger sisters. In 1838, following the deaths of Richard Palmer's parents, the couple married. Richard Palmer and Sarah had one legitimate child, Richard (1840–1883).

Richard Palmer amassed considerable wealth in property, especially that he sold to the emerging railway network and William became interested in the business. William was articled a lawyer's clerk at Haslam & Rees from 1849 to 1854 though he made only one appearance, for his father, in court once qualified. William assisted his father in the property business but felt the allowance he received to be inadequate. By this time, he had come to suspect his illegitimacy and, rightly, that his father's will was made in favour of Richard. William was intent on establishing himself in fashionable society and spent freely to realise his aim. By 1853, he was already £1,000 in debt and as early as 1850 he had already fraudulently mortgaged one of his father's properties at Norbiton Farm to raise funds.

In September 1853, William forged a deed of gift from his mother of Roupell Park, again fraudulently mortgaging the property. He had represented himself the agent of an investor to gain access to the deeds and now found rents from the property paid into his hands. In 1855, his finances not improving, he again represented himself as agent in a land purchase to defraud funds from his father. Further frauds and forgeries followed, including a property at Warley, until William had expropriated some £100,000.

Richard Palmer died on 5 September 1856 and William took the opportunity to destroy the will made in favour of Richard and to forge an alternative in favour of his mother. He was now certain of his illegitimacy. Probate was granted on the forged will on 24 September and William now found access to funds through his mother straightforward.

== Member of Parliament for Lambeth ==
Following the Metropolis Management Act 1855, William was elected to the Lambeth Vestry whose job was to co-ordinate the area's developing infrastructure though he appears to have taken little active role in proceedings. William resolved to stand for parliament in Lambeth and launched his campaign in 1857 with a speech making much of his understanding of working class life and declaring himself to be a reformer:

... to support the ballot, extension of suffrage, equalisation of the poor rate, administrative reform, to uphold the honour of the country in connection with its foreign relations, to oppose compulsory church rates and support the reduction of public expenditure in order to abolish income tax.

On 28 March, his nomination was proposed by Frederick Doulton (1824–1872), brother of Sir Henry Doulton, who had been an unsuccessful candidate at previous elections. Doulton appears to have written many of William's speeches and William had played his part by lavish entertainment of the electorate.

Williams was elected to the House of Commons in the 1857 general election but his campaign was alleged to have cost £6,000, some claimed £9,000. He was accused of bribing and corrupting voters, opening public houses for popular resort and maintaining that they were hired as committee rooms, and paying canvassers. A committee of the House of Commons convened to investigate the allegations. However, it turned out that the agitators for the investigation, Pattison Nickalls and Robert Bristowe, had offered to withdraw their petition and to ensure William a directorship of the South London Railway Company^{(see talk page)} should William use his influence to ensure the passage of the legislation they needed. The investigation was dropped but William's reputation was becoming increasingly tainted.

William held a "Lambeth Election Fête and Dinner" to celebrate his double victory. However, he spoke rarely in the House, devoting most of his energies to developing his property portfolio. He did speak on 25 June 1858, the year of The Great Stink, to criticise sewer schemes that impacted his property. By the 1859 general election, the voters of Lambeth seemed largely to have forgotten, or rationalised, their distaste for William's ethics, and they re-elected him.

== The Roupell case ==
By 1862, William was no longer able to service the mortgages that he had taken out on the misappropriated property and on 30 March destroyed some of his papers and fled to Spain. In August, his brother Richard visited him in Spain and William returned to England. He was recognised and arrested for fraud and forgery.

Richard now initiated a sequence of court cases in the hope of restoring his fortune, firstly against Waite, who was now in possession of the Norbiton Estate.

William gave evidence for his brother, admitting the frauds and forgeries and his own perjury in the grant of probate of his father's estate. It was to have been Waite's defence that William was colluding with his brother Richard, possibly in return for some compensation, but the defence was never heard as the case settled, dividing the value of the estate between Waite and Richard Roupell.

On 24 September 1862, William appeared at the Old Bailey and pleaded guilty to the forgery. The judge, Mr Justice Byles, emphasising the seriousness of the offences, sentenced William to penal servitude for life.

== Release ==
William escaped penal transportation to Gibraltar because he was expected to be a witness in further trials. He spent much of his sentence in hard labour at the Chatham Dockyard. William was released on parole in September 1876. Richard spent the rest of his life attempting, largely unsuccessfully, to recover some of his lost fortune

Richard died in 1883, leaving William an annuity of £52 per year, hardly enough to compensate for 14 years in gaol for perjuring himself in Richard's cause. William became, by all accounts, an amiable old man, involved in the church and charity work and an enthusiastic and able gardener. William died of heart failure and pneumonia at a nursing home in Streatham Hill. In the end, fondly remembered, he was buried in the family vault at West Norwood Cemetery.

== Bibliography ==
- Harris, J. (2001). The Roupells of Lambeth. London: The Streatham Society. ISBN 1-873520-37-9.
- Hill, G. (1879). The Electoral History of the Borough of Lambeth since its Enfranchisement in 1832. London: Stanford. pp. 129–173.

Parliament of the United Kingdom
Preceded by William Arthur Wilkinson; William Williams	Member of Parliament for Lambeth; 1857 – 1862; With: William Williams	Succeeded by Frederick Doulton; William Williams
