= Benjamin Hawes =

British politician

Sir Benjamin Hawes (1797 – 15 May 1862) was a British Whig politician.

== Early life ==
Hawes was a grandson of William Hawes, founder of the Royal Humane Society, and son of Benjamin Hawes of New Barge House, Lambeth, who was a businessman and Fellow of the Society of Antiquaries of London; his mother was Ann Feltham, sister of John Feltham. He had a younger brother, who also was called William. There was another brother, Thomas, and a sister, Caroline who married John Donkin, and a second sister Sarah, married name Curtis. Barge House, where Hawes lived in the 1830s, was in the Christ Church area of Lambeth, at the corner of Commercial Road and Broad Wall.

Hawes was educated at William Carmalt's school at Putney, and when of age in 1818 entered into partnership with his father and uncle, in the business of soap-boiling. He spent relatively little of his life in the industry, but was later known in parliament as "Hawes the Soap-Boiler".

== Hawes Soap Works ==
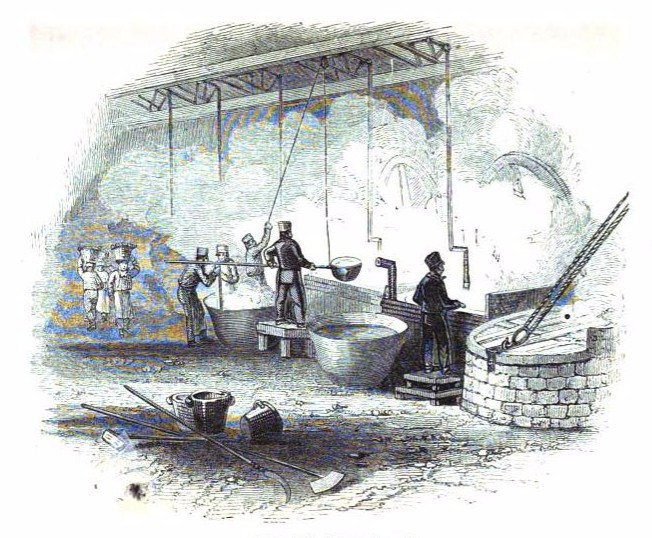
The Hawes Soap Works, 1843 engraving

The Hawes Soap Works stood on the site of the royal barge house of the 16th century, later used as a glassworks; it is also described as being on Upper Ground Street, Blackfriars. To the west of Blackfriars Bridge, it was the largest soap factory in London in its time, during a period in the 19th century. The Topographical History of Surrey of the 1840s, by Edward Wedlake Brayley, stated that the works had been in existence for 75 years. In the 1820s manufacturers on Merseyside were beginning to compete seriously with those of London, and issues of process and duty on raw materials (such as kelp, barilla for alkali, and common salt) were affecting business decisions. The Hawes family were engaged in lobbying Parliament. Benjamin Hawes as MP spoke for the reduction of soap duties.

In 1820 Josias Parkes gave evidence to a parliamentary select committee that his firm had supplied steam power to the boiler of the Hawes Works. The works then installed its own gas oil plant. In 1824 Benjamin Hawes the elder gave parliament evidence of the company's use of gas lighting. He went on to be chairman of the Gas Light & Coke Company. His younger son William innovated with "Hawes' soap", the product of the "cold process" for soap manufacture, and was granted a patent in 1839.

The works closed down in 1849. Soap was taxed at that time in the United Kingdom, and an article in the Freeman's Journal made the case that the demands of the exciseman had put the Hawes factory out of business. In 1856, at the Royal Society of Arts, the industrial history of soap-making in the United Kingdom, in the first half of the nineteenth century, was debated by William Hawes and Warren De la Rue.

== Member of Parliament ==
Hawes became a magistrate for Surrey in 1828 and was elected as a Member of Parliament for Lambeth at the 1832 general election. As a member of parliament he proposed radical changes in several areas, promoted technical advances, and was the instigator in 1841, and an initial member of, the Royal Fine Art Commission. Though not a member of the Anti-Corn Law League, he was an advocate of the repeal of the Corn Laws. He worked on behalf of the penny postage system; he was a supporter of the Thames Tunnel scheme; and interested himself in the battle of the gauges. He was a proponent of the electric telegraph, and made the first arrangement for the partnership between Sir William Fothergill Cooke and Sir Charles Wheatstone in 1837. When Robert Peel announced in parliament the removal of support for the difference engine, in 1842, Hawes was the only MP to speak in its support.

Having engineered an inquiry in 1835 into the running of the British Museum, Hawes put the case for scientists having a voice among its trustees, a line supported by witnesses Robert Edmond Grant and Nicholas Vigors. Opposition came from Robert Harry Inglis. The zoologists Grant and Vigors were concerned that the museum should become a research institution, with systematic across the field of natural history, and should implement current views on taxonomy; they had support from James Scott Bowerbank, but they were resisted successfully by Philip Grey Egerton and John George Children, who backed the more conservative views of Richard Owen. There were other issues, such as public access, and Edward Edwards addressed proposals about that to Hawes in 1836.

Hawes joined the Church Rates Abolition Society founded in 1836 by Charles Lushington, with the MPs Thomas Slingsby Duncombe, William Ewart, Daniel Whittle Harvey, and Joseph Hume. He was one of a small group of MPs showing sympathy with Chartist agitation in 1837; though he backed away from close involvement. He was also one of a group of radicals in parliament attempting to regulate the medical profession. With Hume, Thomas Wakley and Henry Warburton he tried, unsuccessfully, to introduce legislation for medical reform.

Under the government of John Russell, 1st Earl Russell he was made Under-Secretary of State for War and the Colonies rather than a full cabinet minister in an attempt to appease Henry Grey, the Secretary of State. When it was revealed Grey would prefer Charles Buller Hawes offered to resign. Grey being in the House of Lords, Hawes had to answer on Colonial Office business in the Commons; and managed to make his own opinions known, though a deputy. Hawes encouraged James FitzGerald, introduced by Anthony Panizzi of the British Museum, in his initial scheme of 1847 for a colony on Vancouver Island, closely based on the ideas of Edward Gibbon Wakefield; when there was serious criticism in the Commons, particularly from William Ewart Gladstone, of Grey and the Hudson's Bay Company as Fitzgerald's scheme foundered, Hawes defended the Colonial Office position in lukewarm fashion.

Charles Pearson stood successfully, and Hawes was defeated, in Lambeth at the 1847 general election and was instead elected for the corrupt seat of Kinsale by only three votes. He resigned on 25 October 1851 by appointment as Steward of the Chiltern Hundreds, and was appointed to the unelected position of Deputy Secretary at War, a position he held till 1857.

== At the War Office ==
Hawes as official opposed sweeping change in his department. When Charles Edward Trevelyan reported on it, Hawes produced his own counter-report. For two years he served under Sidney Herbert, who worked closely with Florence Nightingale; but in 1854, during the first part of the Crimean War, Herbert went out of office. Hawes then acquired the reputation, with Nightingale, of obstructing her at every turn.

Jonathan Peel was of the view that the adoption of the Armstrong Gun was a result of Hawes's influence. In 1857, reorganisation of the War Office brought Hawes into a new post, as Permanent Under-Secretary. In 1860 Charles Babbage was dealing with Hawes, promoting a scientific approach to gunnery.

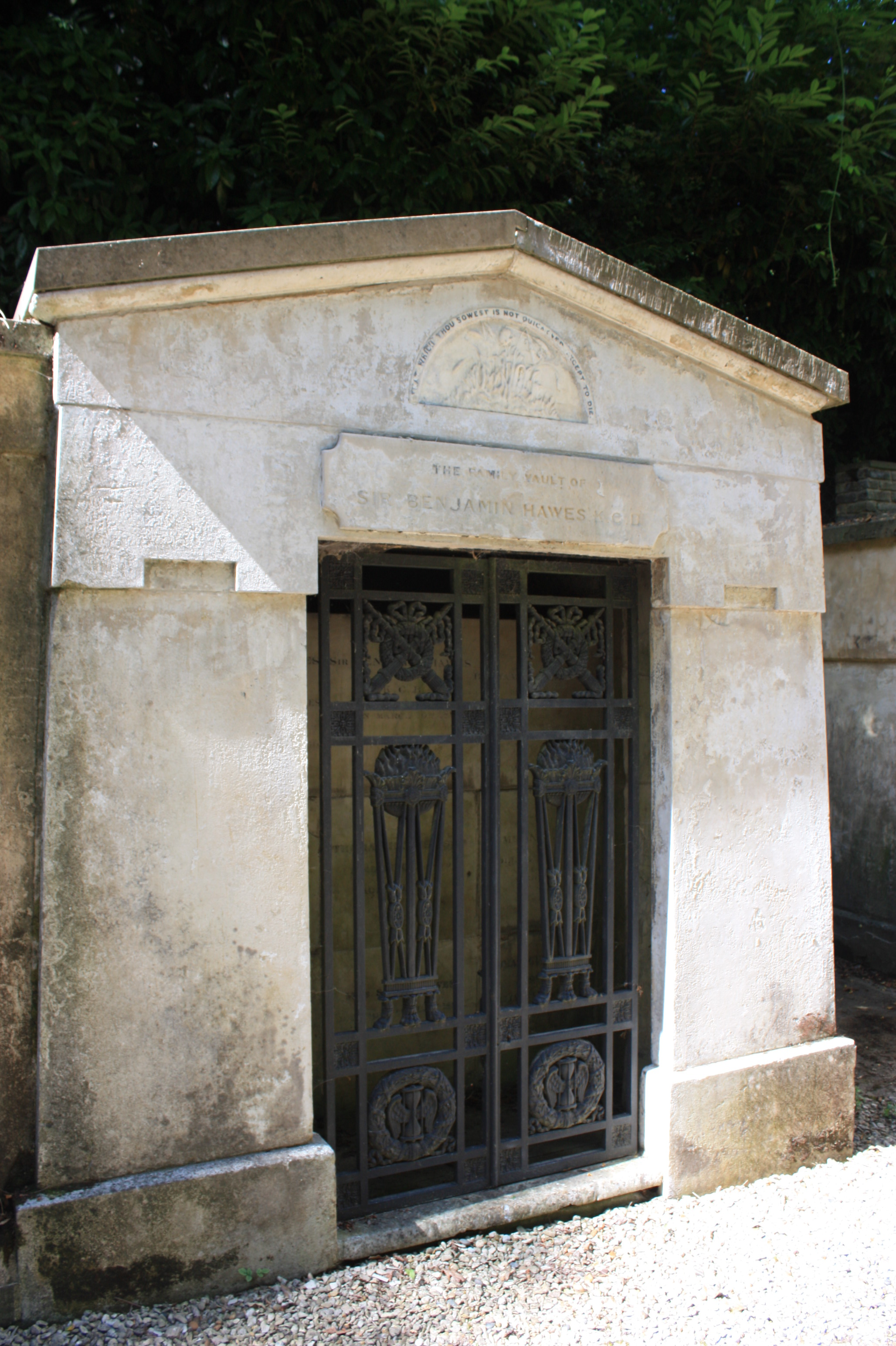
The vault of Benjamin Hawes, Highgate Cemetery, London

== Works ==
Hawes was the author of:

- A Narrative of an Ascent of Mont Blanc during the Summer of 1827 by Mr. W. Hawes and Mr. C. Fellows (1828).
- The Abolition of Arrest and Imprisonment for Debt considered in Six Letters (1836).
- Speech of B. Hawes, jun., in opposition to the second reading of the Bank of England Charter Bill (1844).

He also wrote a paper in the Transactions of the Central Society of Education, 1838.

== Family ==
In 1820, Hawes married Sophia Macnamara Brunel, daughter of Marc Brunel. She died on 17 January 1878. The eldest daughter Sophia Brunel Hawes married Charles Justin MacCarthy in 1848.

The marriage made Isambard Kingdom Brunel his brother-in-law; and in his capacity at the War Office, Hawes called in 1855 on the younger Brunel to design a pre-fabricated military hospital, for the Crimean War.

== Death ==
He died on 15 May 1862 and is buried in a family vault in Highgate Cemetery, where he happened to be chairman for a number of years.

Parliament of the United Kingdom
New constituency	Member of Parliament for Lambeth; 1832–1847; With: Charles Tennyson (from 1835 Tennyson-d'Eyncourt)	Succeeded by Charles Pearson; Charles Tennyson-d'Eyncourt
Preceded by Richard Samuel Guinness	Member of Parliament for Kinsale; 1848–1851	Succeeded by John Isaac Heard
Political offices
Preceded by The Lord Lyttelton	Under-Secretary of State for War and the Colonies; 1846–1851	Succeeded by Frederick Peel
