= William Williams (Radical politician) =

Welsh Radical politician (born 1788)

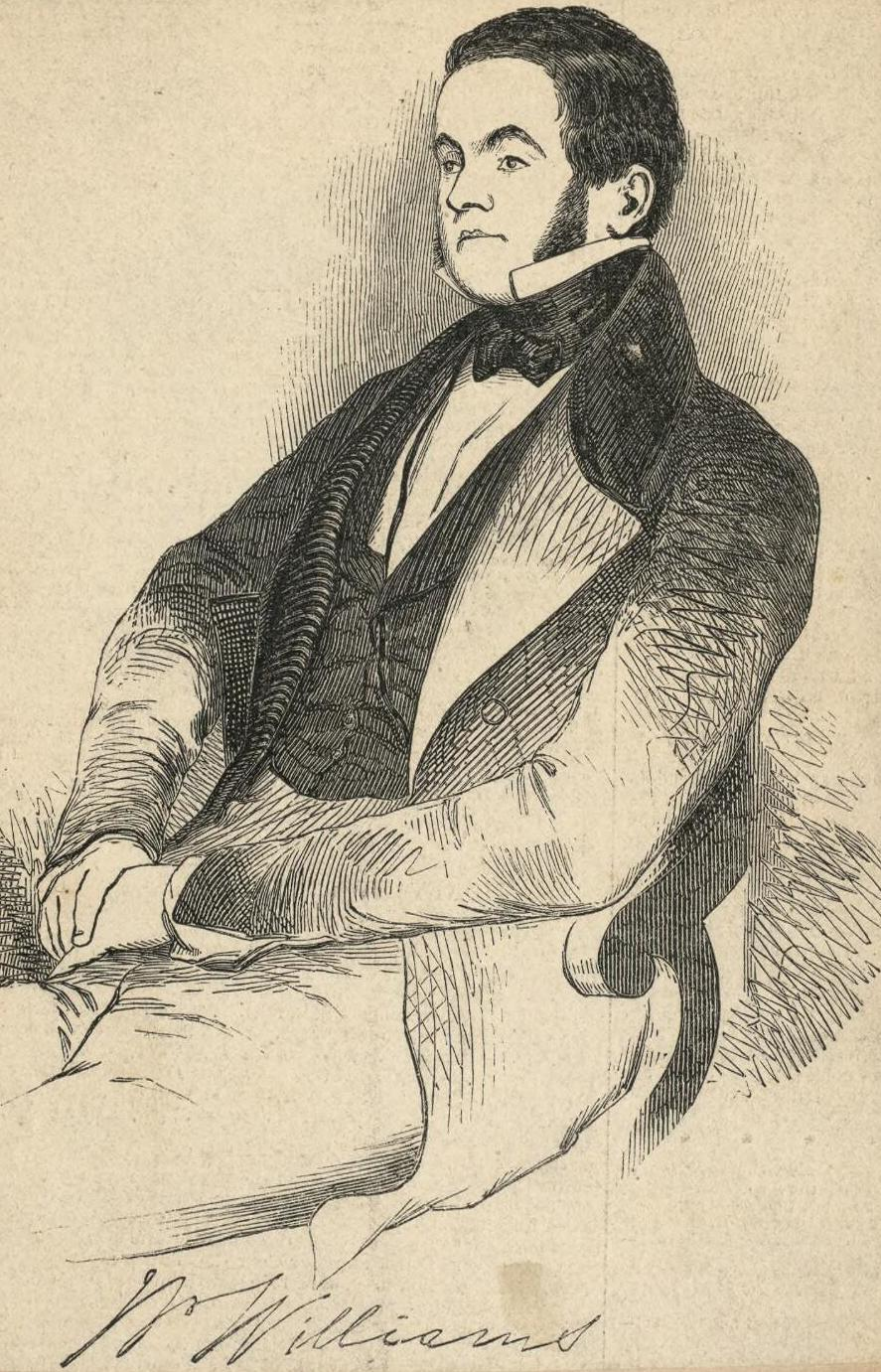
Portrait of William Williams

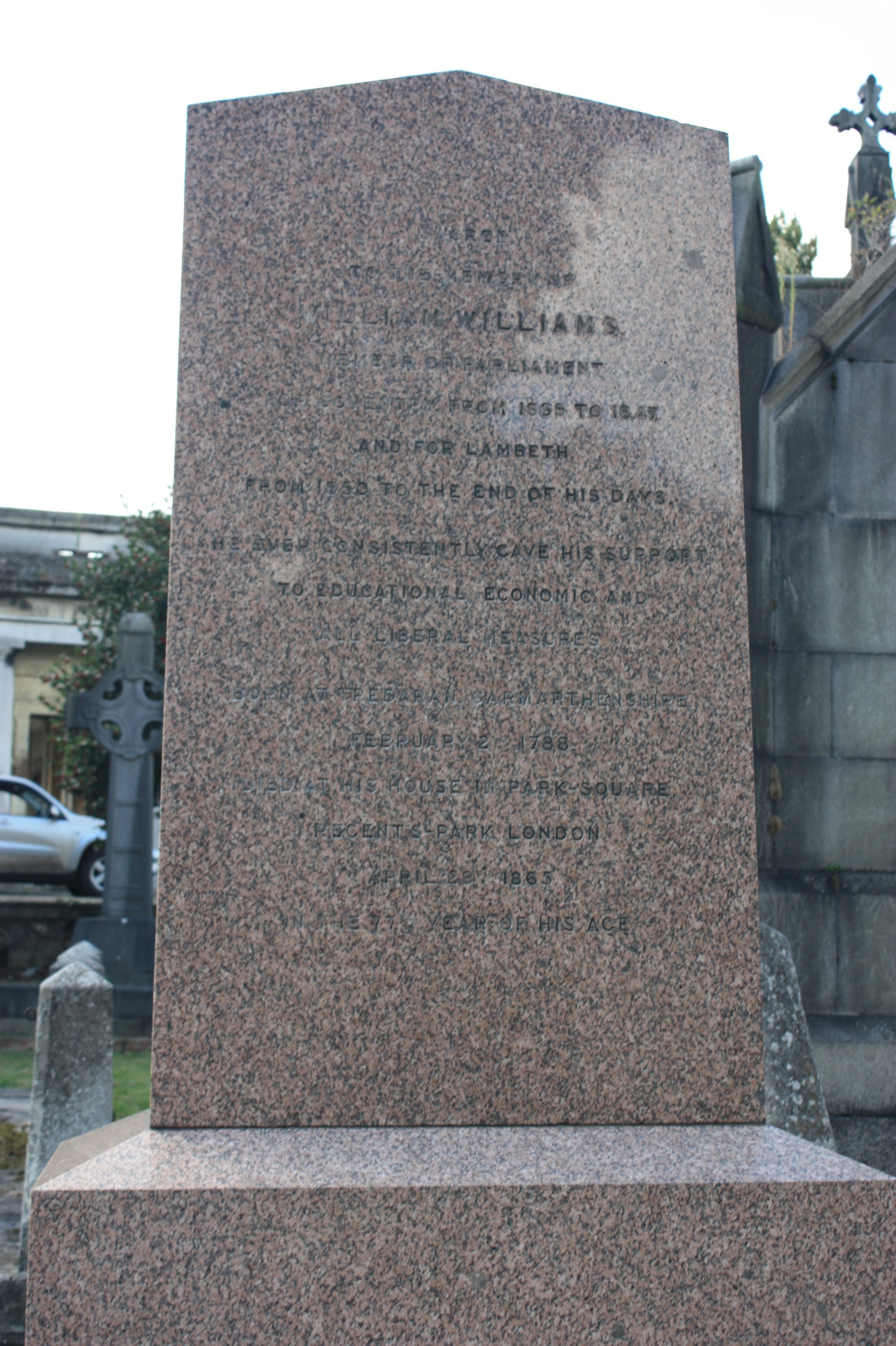
The grave of William Williams MP, Kensal Green Cemetery

William Williams (12 February 1788 – 26 April 1865), was a Welsh Radical politician.

Born in Llanpumsaint, Carmarthenshire, and having had only a basic education, Williams began working in a cotton warehouse in London and soon built up his own business. In 1833 he became a member of the Common Council of the City of London, and in 1835 was elected MP for Coventry. After losing the seat in 1847, he became MP for Lambeth in 1850.

As a result of a speech made by Williams on 10 March 1846, a government inquiry into the state of education in Wales was launched, culminating in the 1847 Reports of the Commissioners of Inquiry into the State of Education in Wales. In 1863 he chaired the meeting that launched the campaign for a University of Wales.

William Williams was a generous benefactor to the village of his birth, paying for the construction and furnishing of the village school in 1862.

William Williams died on 26 April 1865, after falling from his horse in Hyde Park, London. He is buried in Kensal Green Cemetery, London, in a grave north-east of the main chapel, alongside his parliamentary friend Joseph Hume. A plaque is dedicated to him in the village school he founded in Llanpumsaint.

Parliament of the United Kingdom
Preceded by Edward Ellice; Henry Bulwer	Member of Parliament for Coventry; 1835–1847; With: Edward Ellice	Succeeded by Edward Ellice; George James Turner
Preceded by Charles Pearson; Charles Tennyson-d'Eyncourt	Member of Parliament for Lambeth; 1850–1865; With: Charles Tennyson-d'Eyncourt to 1852; William Arthur Wilkinson 1852–1857; William Roupell 1857–1862; Frederick Doulton from 1862	Succeeded by Frederick Doulton; James Clarke Lawrence
