= Roupell case =

1862 English legal dispute about alleged forged documents

Roupell (Richard) v Waite; R v Roupell (William); Roupell (Richard) v Hays
- Court: Crown Court
- Decided: 1862 and 1863

Court membership
- Judges sitting: William Channell (in the cases of Roupell v Waite and Roupell v Hays); Justice Byles (R v Roupell)

The Roupell case (1862) was a notorious English legal dispute that centred on legal documents alleged to have been forged by William Roupell and excited great public interest.

== Background ==
William Roupell was the illegitimate son of Richard Palmer Roupell who possessed extensive properties in London and the Home Counties. By 1853, William, who spent unwisely seeking to establish himself in fashionable society, was already in debt and launched a sequence of deceptions and forgeries, dishonestly to obtain much of his father's property. In particular, he forged a deed conveying Norbiton Estate to himself and then sold it to Mr Waite. Further, he destroyed his father's will, which had left much of his property to William's brother Richard, and forged a will leaving it to William's mother, with himself as executor. His father died in 1856 and in 1857 William was elected Liberal Party Member of Parliament for Lambeth.

By 1862, William was no longer able to service the mortgages that he had taken out on the misappropriated property and on 30 March destroyed some of his papers and fled to Spain. In August, his brother Richard visited him in Spain and William returned to England. He was recognised and arrested for fraud and forgery.

== Roupell (Richard) v. Waite ==
Judge
Mr Baron Martin
Counsel for the claimant	Counsel for the Defendant
Mr Serjeant Shee Mr Lush QC Mr Browne	William Bovill MP QC Mr Hawkins QC Mr Garth

Richard sued Waite for possession of Norbiton Estate, contending that he would have inherited it under his father's valid, but destroyed, will. The trial began at Guildford on 18 August 1862.

Shee opened Richard's case by presenting the background of the Roupell family property, William's financial difficulties and the alleged facts of the frauds and forgeries. Shee argued that the will must be a forgery as, purporting to be witnessed by William, William could not have been present to witness its execution on the said date. Shee called William who admitted the frauds and forgeries and his own perjury in the grant of probate of his father's estate. It was to have been Waite's defence that William was colluding with his brother Richard, possibly in return for some compensation, but the defence was never heard as the case settled, dividing the value of the estate between Waite and Richard Roupell.

== R v. Roupell (William) ==
On 24 September 1862, William appeared at the Old Bailey and pleaded guilty to the forgery. The judge, Mr Justice Byles, emphasising the seriousness of the offences, sentenced William to penal servitude for life.

== Roupell (Richard) v. Hays ==
In 1863, Richard again attempted to regain property in Great Warley, Essex by proving that mortgages on the property were invalid, having been obtained through forgery. William, still in custody but not in prison dress, again gave evidence of his own wrongdoing and various witnesses attested to Richard Palmer's careful business habits and his handwriting and signature. Forensic document examiner Charles Chabot gave expert evidence that the signature was not Richard Palmer's.

The judge, Mr Baron Channell, warned the jury as to the unreliability of William's testimony and put to them four questions:

1. Was the deed of gift in question signed by Richard Palmer in the presence of two witnesses?
2. If not, did Richard Palmer, sign and seal the deed, despite the absence of witnesses?
3. Was the will bequeathing property to Richard Palmer's wife genuine?
4. If not, was Richard the rightful heir?

The jury retired, The Times observing that they jury had a pile of shorthand notes about a foot in height that would overwhelm them and that the jury would probably be confused anyway. The jury returned after three hours, finding that the deed had not been signed in the presence of witnesses but unable to agree whether Richard Palmer had signed the deed at all. Further, the jury agreed that the will was a forgery but were unable to agree on the proof of Richard's rightful inheritance. Even after several hours' further deliberation, the jury were unable to agree.

Though a retrial was mooted, the issue ultimately settled out of court. William was released on parole in September 1876. Richard spent the rest of his life attempting, largely unsuccessfully, to recover some of his lost fortune

== Cultural references ==
- William Makepeace Thackeray satirised William's downfall as that of "Roupilius" in The Roundabout Papers.

== Bibliography ==
- Harris, J. (2001). The Roupells of Lambeth. London: The Streatham Society. ISBN 1-873520-37-9.
