= Henry Doulton =

English businessman (1820–1897)

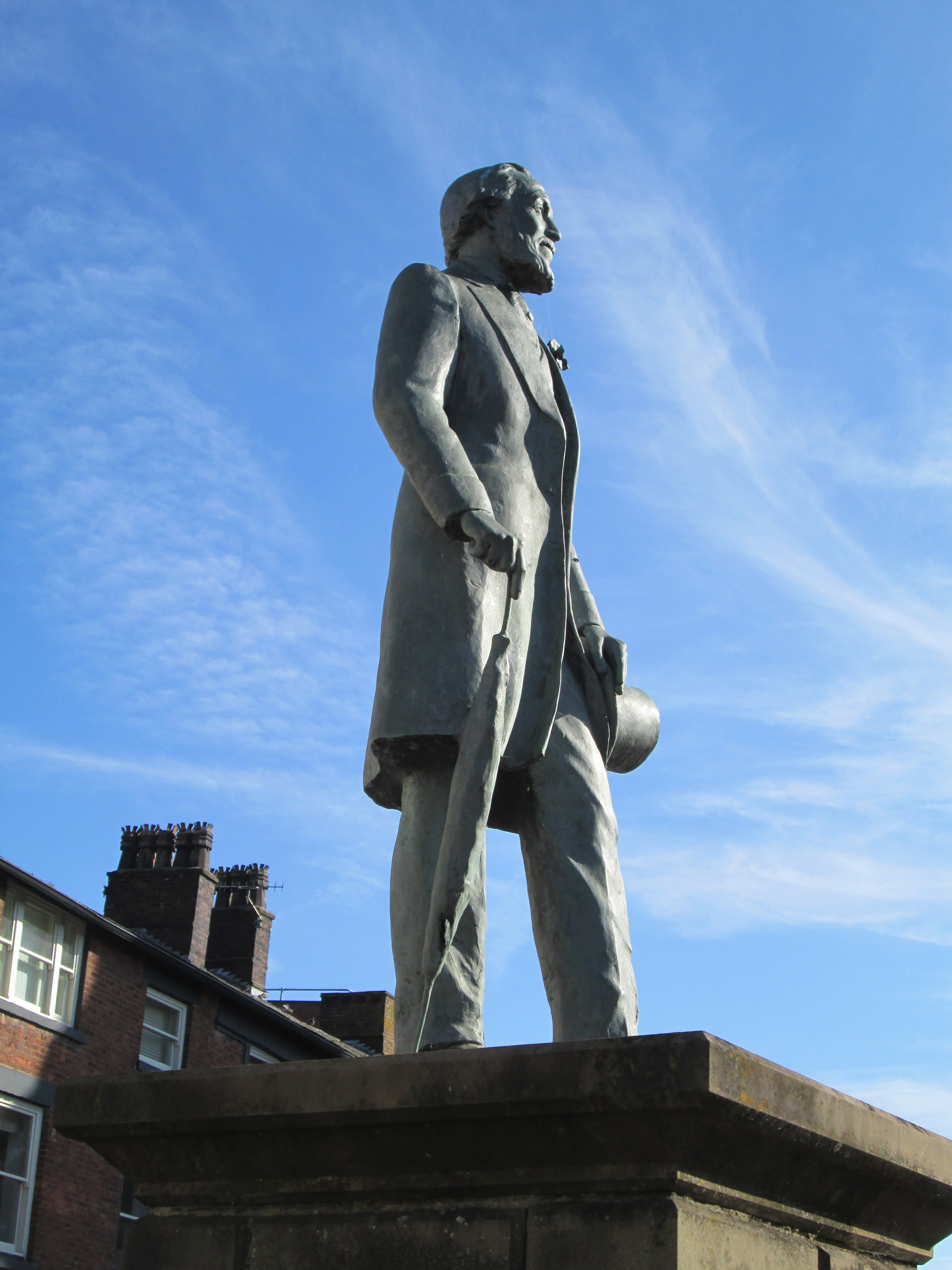
Statue of Henry Doulton in Burslem, unveiled in 1991

Sir Henry Doulton (25 July 1820 – 18 November 1897) was an English businessman, inventor and manufacturer of pottery, instrumental in developing the ceramics company of Royal Doulton.

== Life ==
Born in Vauxhall, Henry was the second of the eight children of John Doulton (1793–1873), a pottery manufacturer, and his wife, Jane Duneau, a widow from Bridgnorth in Shropshire. His brother, Frederick Doulton, became Member of Parliament for Lambeth from 1862 until 1868. His father had become a partner in a pottery business in 1815 but Henry was the most academic of his children. Henry spent two years at the University College School where he developed a love of literature. His father had thought Henry the least likely to join the family business, perhaps being destined for a profession, but in 1835, he joined the firm, as did all his brothers other than Frederick.

One of the first results of his many experiments was the production of good enamel glazes. In 1846 he initiated in Lambeth the pipe works, in which he superintended the manufacture of the drainage and sanitary appliances which helped to make the firm of Doulton famous.

In 1870 the manufacture of "Art pottery" was begun at Lambeth, using the skills of students from the Lambeth School of Art (later the City and Guilds of London Art School). The company exhibited at the Centennial Exposition of 1876 in Philadelphia.

In 1877, works were opened at Burslem, where almost every variety of porcelain and earthenware has been produced. Works have since been opened at Rowley Regis, Smethwick, St Helens, Paisley and Paris. After the Paris exhibition of 1878, Henry Doulton was made a Chevalier of the Légion d'honneur.

In 1872, the Art department was instituted in the Doulton works, giving employment to both male and female artists, among whom such workers as George Tinworth and Misses Hannah and Florence Barlow obtained a reputation outside their immediate sphere.

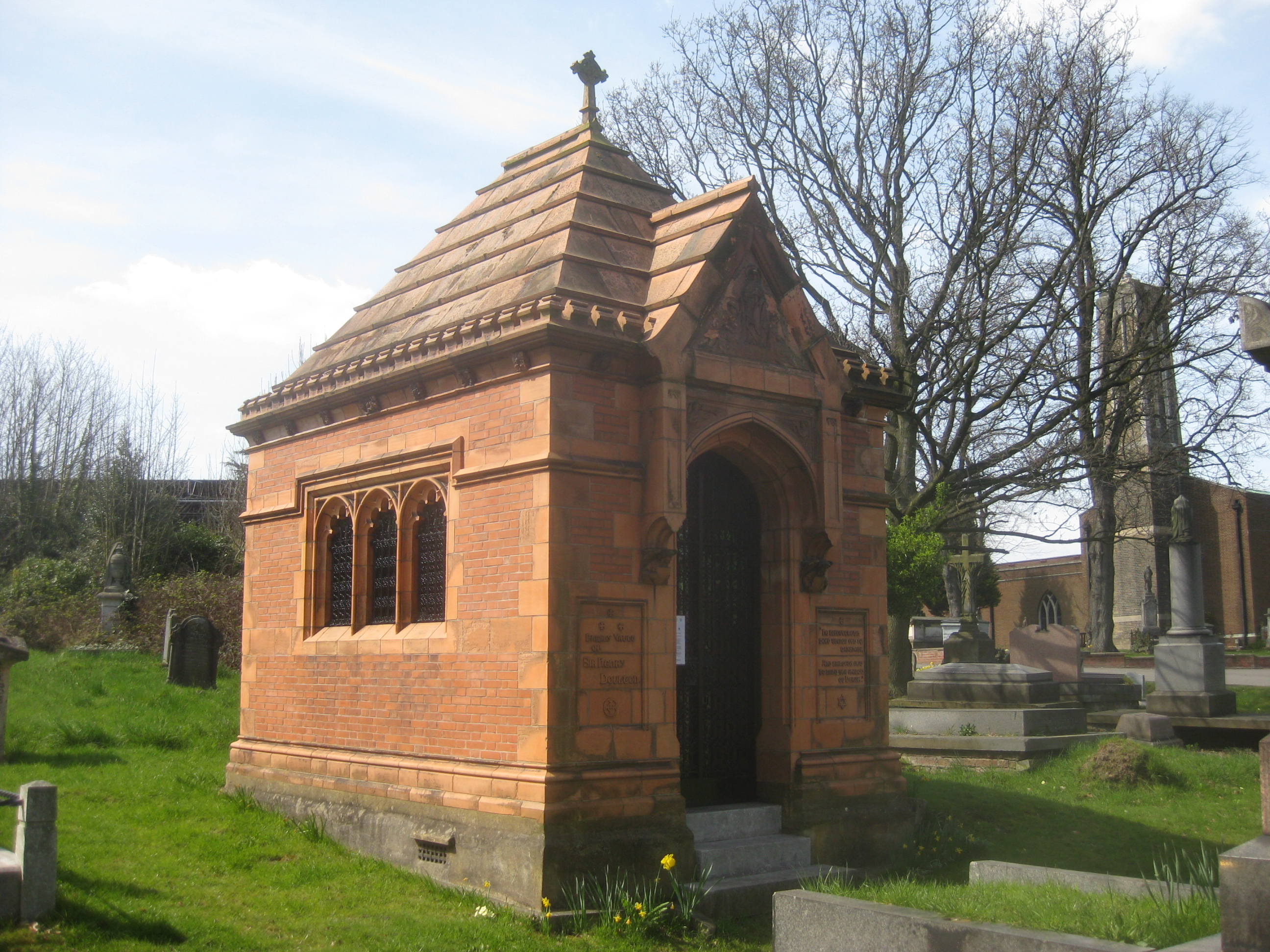
Mausoleum of Henry Doulton at West Norwood Cemetery

On 12 August 1887, Doulton received the honour of a knighthood, and in 1885 he was awarded the Albert Medal by the Royal Society of Arts.

Doulton died at his residence, 10 Queen's Gate Gardens, London, on 17 November 1897, and was buried at Norwood cemetery. The business was turned into a joint-stock company in 1899.

After his death in London, he was placed in a mausoleum at West Norwood Cemetery appropriately constructed from red pottery tiles and bricks from the Doulton Works, which is now a Grade II Listed building.

== Family ==
In 1849, he married Sarah Kennaby. They had three children, Sarah Lillian (1852–), Henry Lewis (1853–1930), and Katherine Duneau (1856–1932). Sarah Kennaby Doulton died in 1888. Sir Henry Doulton took an active interest, as almoner, in St Thomas' Hospital.

== Bibliography ==
- Clement, Alexander James. "Doulton, Sir Henry (1820–1897)". Oxford Dictionary of National Biography (online ed.). Oxford University Press. doi:10.1093/ref:odnb/7944. (Subscription, Wikipedia Library access or UK public library membership required.)
- Eyles, D. (1965). Royal Doulton, 1815–1965: The Rise and Expansion of the Royal Doulton Potteries. London: Hutchinson.
- Eyles, D.; Irvine, L. (2002). The Doulton Lambeth wares (2nr rev ed.). London: Richard Dennis. ISBN 0-903685-79-5.
- Eyles, D.; et al. (1994). Royal Doulton Figures: Produced at Burslem, Staffordshire, c1890-1994 (3rd rev ed.). London: Richard Dennis. ISBN 0-903685-35-3.
- Gosse, E., ed. D. Eyles (1970). Sir Henry Doulton: The Man of Business as a Man of Imagination. London: Hutchinson. ISBN 0-09-103590-2.
