= William Hawes (1805–1885) =

English businessman, banker and reformer

William Hawes (1805–1885) was an English businessman, banker and reformer, noted for efforts to improve the workings of the Poor Laws, bankruptcy law and excise.

== Early life ==
Hawes was the grandson of William Hawes M.D., and the brother of Benjamin Hawes; his parents were Benjamin Hawes (1770–1861), in business as a soap-boiler and a philanthropist, and Ann Feltham, sister of John Feltham. In 1827 he climbed Mont Blanc with Charles Fellows (address given as 26 Russell Square). With guides, they opened up what became known as the "Corridor Route" to the summit; the way via the Corridor and Mur de la Côte was standard for the next 30 years. An account of the ascent was published in 1828, edited by Benjamin Hawes, the younger.

Initially Hawes was in the family soap-boiling business. A friend of Isambard Kingdom Brunel from youth, he joined the Institution of Civil Engineers in 1829, and was then described as a soap manufacturer. He married in 1833, as was recorded in Brunel's diary, to Anna Cartwright, daughter of Samuel Cartwright. He became chairman of the London and County Bank, retiring in 1847–8. The Hawes Soap Factory in New Cross, south London, was closed down in 1849, a move attributed by the family to the excise duty on soap, against which they had campaigned.

== Interests ==
Hawes was involved in a number of learned and other societies. He was a Fellow of the Geological Society, from 1831 (address 17 Montagu Place, Russell Square); and the same year is listed (at St. John's Lambeth) as Fellow of the Zoological Society, and member of the Royal Institution. In 1848 he was borrowing a Royal Institution battery from Michael Faraday. He was a Fellow of the Statistical Society.

Hawes chaired the Council of the Royal Society of Arts (RSA) four times in all, from 1863 to 1865 and in 1867. The membership included technocrats, largely Whig, Peelite or Radical in politics. His involvement with the RSA included promoting technical education; he coupled his support of artisans, for whom the RSA provided foreign travel, with opposition to trades unions. He brought in the Prince of Wales as President, in 1863. Not uniformly admired, he found that his report to the RSA on the 1862 International Exhibition placed him, according to the Gas Journal, among "dull, commonplace, fluent people".

Attending the meeting of 29 July 1857 at Lord Brougham's house, where the Social Science Association (SSA) was set up, Hawes is counted one of its founders. In social matters, he had shown the visiting Gustave d'Eichthal round working-class dwellings, in 1828; and was still concerned with the issue in 1866. He took an interest in the management of public baths and washhouses, workhouses and hospitals. In 1869, during the debate on the bill for the Elementary Education Act 1870, he defended the educational contribution of the livery companies. He belonged to the Haberdashers Company.

Elizabeth Garrett was admitted to Middlesex Hospital for medical training in 1860. This came about through networking and Hawes, a governor of the hospital. Barbara Bodichon introduced Garrett to Emelia Gurney, who had provided Garrett with an introduction to Hawes; Hawes and Newson Garrett, Elizabeth's father, already knew each other via business; while Russell Gurney, Emelia's husband, was first cousin to Hawes, since William Hawes M.D. was his maternal grandfather. In 1871 Hawes spoke in favour of a presentation by Maria Grey to the RSA on female education.

An official of the Law Amendment Society, in association with the SSA, Hawes took a particular interest in the law relating to bankruptcy, in the 1860s. He spoke to the SSA in 1860, on anonymous writing in the press, and in 1863 on patent law. He took a negative view of the proliferation of patents.

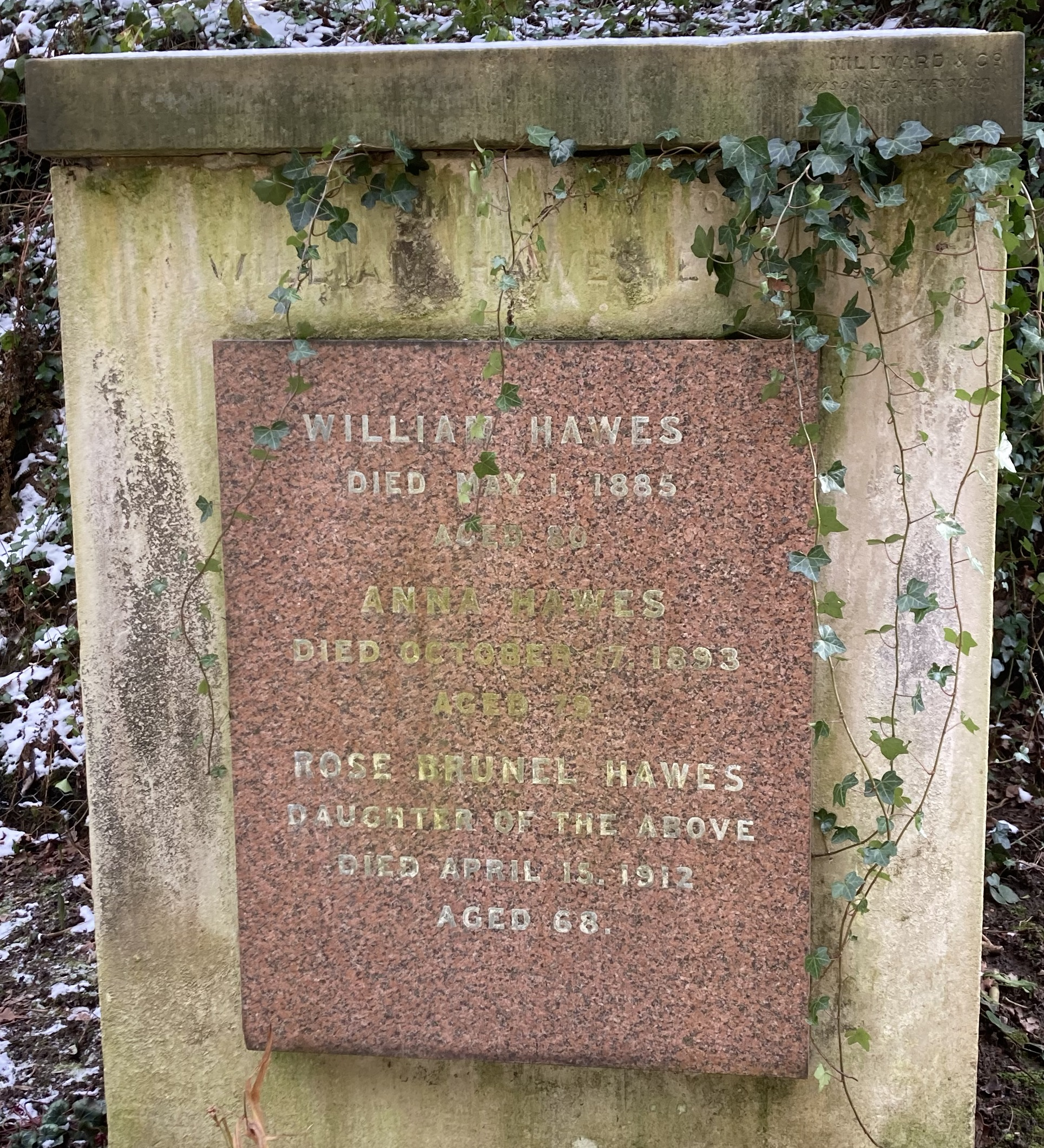
Family vault of William Hawes in Highgate Cemetery (west side)

== Later business career ==
In 1851 Hawes was chairman of the Australian Royal Mail Steam Navigation Company (ARM). The Australian gold rushes were fuelling emigration to the continent, and the ARM placed orders for two steam screw vessels, Adelaide and Victoria, using Brunel as consultant. In 1852 Hawes oversaw the trial of Adelaide, built by John Scott Russell at Millwall. It sailed to Adelaide in Australia, arriving in May 1853, but problems on the way had added three months to the voyage. The Victoria also went to Australia in 1853. The Crimean War saw Adelaide sailing to the Black Sea. After the war, which had removed steamers from the Australia route, the European and Australian (as it had become) was taken over in 1857–8 by the Royal Mail Steam Packet Company.

During later life Hawes was involved in railway companies. He was a director of the Wallingford and Watlington Railway, and an investor in the North Metropolitan Railway and East London Railway, both of which he chaired. He was a director also of the Thames Tunnel Company. An advocate of a Channel Tunnel, he was a member of Sir John Hawkshaw's 1870 committee that sought government backing for the project, and read a paper on the subject to the Society of Arts in 1874. He was a director of the National Telegraph Manufacturing Company, set up in 1870.

He is buried in a family vault at Highgate Cemetery.
