= Charles Chabot =

English graphologist

Charles Chabot (baptised 19 March 1815 – 15 October 1882) was an English graphologist who, as part of the firm of Netherclift, Chabot and Matheson, was an early practitioner of questioned document examination.

Chabot was born Battersea, the son of Charles, a lithographer, and Amy née Pearson, a couple of Huguenot descent.

Beginning as a lithographer, he developed as an expert in handwriting and became sought after as an expert witness in a variety of famous trials including the Roupell case and the Tichborne Case.

In 1871, Chabot became involved in establishing the identity of Junius and concluded that he was Sir Philip Francis.

Chabot married Sarah née Nichols in 1842 and the couple parented at least one son, Charles. Chabot died at home in London. and was buried at the South Metropolitan Cemetery at West Norwood

== Bibliography ==
- Obituaries:
  - The Times, 17 Oct 1882
  - Illustrated London News, 25 Nov 1882, 549

- [Anon.] (1885). "Experts in handwriting". Cornhill Magazine. 4 (new ser.): 148–62.
- Chabot, C. (1871). The Handwriting of Junius Professionally Investigated. London: John Murray.
- Henderson, T. F.; Haigh, John D. (reviewer) (2004). "Chabot, Charles (bap. 1815, d. 1882)". Oxford Dictionary of National Biography (online ed.). Oxford University Press. doi:10.1093/ref:odnb/5008. (Subscription or UK public library membership required.)
