= Robert William Mills =

English politician (1777–1851)

Member of Parliament for Bletchingley
- In office 30 July 1830 – 18 February 1831 Serving with Charles Tennyson-d'Eyncourt

Personal details
- Born: 1777
- Died: 9 March 1851 (aged 73–74)
- Party: Whig

Robert William Mills (1777 – 9 March 1851) was an English politician. He served as a Member of Parliament (MP).

== See also ==
- List of MPs elected in the 1830 United Kingdom general election
