= William Arthur Wilkinson =

British politician

William Arthur Wilkinson (1795 – 13 April 1865) was a British Liberal Party politician who sat in the House of Commons from 1852 to 1857.

He unsuccessfully contested Sunderland at the 1847 general election and at a by-election in December that year. He was elected at the 1852 general election as a Member of Parliament (MP) for Lambeth, but was heavily defeated at the 1857 general election by William Roupell.

He then contested Reigate at the 1859 general election, before standing again in Lambeth at a by-election in May 1862 following the resignation of Roupell, who defeated him in 1857 and had fled to Spain amidst allegations of forgery. However, he came a poor third, with less than 10% of the votes.

He stood for a final time at a by-election in Reigate in February 1863, but was again unsuccessful.

Parliament of the United Kingdom
Preceded by Charles Tennyson-d'Eyncourt; William Williams	Member of Parliament for Lambeth; 1852–1857; With: William Williams	Succeeded by William Roupell; William Williams
