= Charles Tennyson-d'Eyncourt =

British politician and landowner

The Right Honourable Charles Tennyson-d'Eyncourt FRS

Member of Parliament for Lambeth
- In office 1832–1852 Serving with Benjamin Hawes, Charles Pearson, William Williams
- Preceded by: New constituency
- Succeeded by: William Arthur Wilkinson; William Williams

Member of Parliament for Stamford
- In office 1831–1832 Serving with Lord Thomas Cecil
- Preceded by: Lord Thomas Cecil; Thomas Chaplin
- Succeeded by: Thomas Chaplin; George Finch

Clerk of the Ordnance
- In office December 1830 – February 1832
- Preceded by: Spencer Perceval
- Succeeded by: Thomas Francis Kennedy

Member of Parliament for Bletchingley
- In office 1826–1831 Serving with William Russell, Hon. William Lamb, William Ewart, Robert William Mills, William Horne, Hon. John Ponsonby
- Preceded by: Lord Francis Leveson-Gower; Edward Henry Edwardes
- Succeeded by: Thomas Hyde Villiers; Henry John Temple

Member of Parliament for Great Grimsby
- In office 1818–1826 Serving with John Nicholas Fazakerley, William Duncombe
- Preceded by: Sir Robert Heron, Bt; John Peter Grant
- Succeeded by: Charles Wood; George Heneage

Personal details
- Born: Charles Tennyson; 20 July 1784
- Died: 21 July 1861 (aged 77)
- Spouse: Frances Mary Hutton (m. 1808)
- Relations: Alfred, Lord Tennyson (nephew)
- Parent(s): George Tennyson; Mary Turner
- Education: St John's College, Cambridge

Charles Tennyson-d'Eyncourt (20 July 1784 – 21 July 1861), born Charles Tennyson, was a British politician, landowner and Member of Parliament for Stamford from 1831 to 1832 and for Lambeth from 1832 to 1852. He is also known for his social pretensions and his graceless behaviour towards his nephew, the poet Alfred, Lord Tennyson. He was educated at St John's College, Cambridge.

== Early life ==
He was the younger son of Mary (née Turner) Tennyson and George Tennyson, who bought the family seat of Bayons, in the village of Tealby, Lincolnshire, along with 2,000 acres (8 km^{2}) of land, and came in time to own a large part of the village. His elder sister, Elizabeth Tennyson, was the wife of Matthew Russell, MP. At the age of 12, his elder brother, George Clayton Tennyson, was disinherited by their father, put into a career in the Church, and the family fortune was bestowed on Charles. As a result, there was bad blood between the Tennysons of Somersby, where his brother lived before his death, and the opulent Tennysons of Bayons, who considered themselves socially superior.

His mother was the daughter, and eventual heir, of John Turner of Caistor. His paternal grandparents were Michael Tennyson and Elizabeth (née Clayton) Tennyson. It was from her, the Clayton line, that the family claimed to be descended from the Lords Lovell and Baron Deincourt, and also from King Edward III.

== Career ==
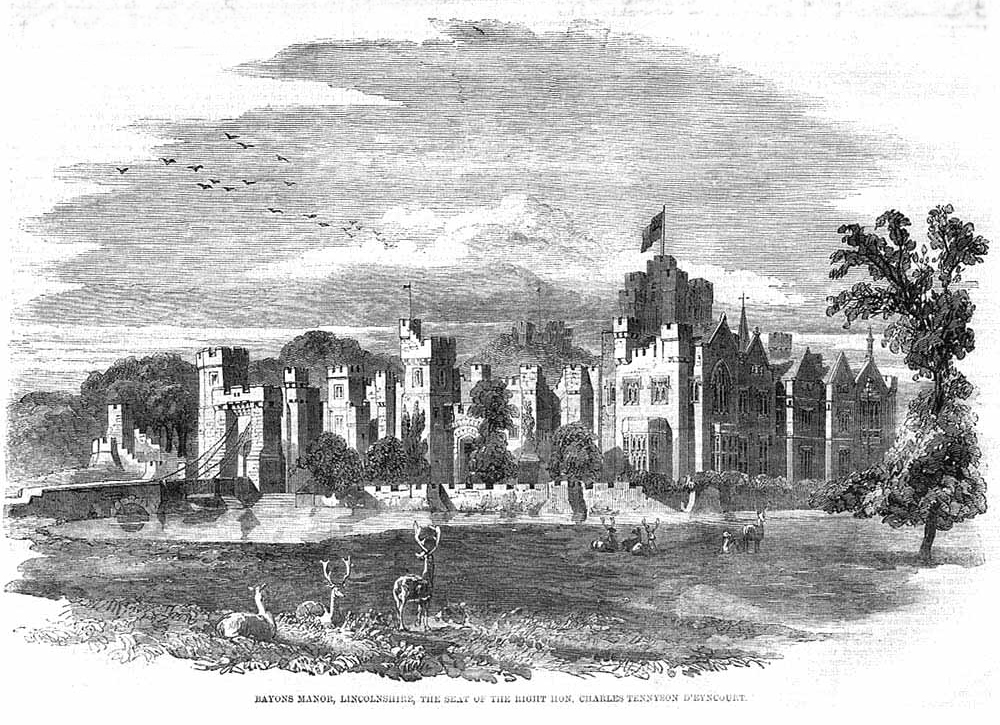
Bayons Manor, 1859

Upon his father's death at Usselby Hall in July 1835, Tennyson inherited the family estates and changed his family's name to Tennyson-d'Eyncourt. A ruined castle was part of the property, and Charles wished to establish a noble lineage for himself with a title and a castle. Beacons was renamed Bayons, to make it sound like a Norman castle, and it was extensively enlarged and rebuilt in the style of a Gothic castellated manor-house. Bayons Manor house was built between 1836 and 1842 to designs by William Adams Nicholson and with contributions made by Anthony Salvin. It consisted of castellated mansion with a moat, machicolated and embattled towers, curtain-wall and great hall with a hammer-beam roof.

=== Public life ===
For many years, he was MP for Lambeth, and was made a Privy Counsellor in 1832. Also in the 1830s, along with Augustus, Duke of Sussex, and Admiral Sir Sidney Smith, he was one of the prime movers in a plan to have the Order of Knights Templar revived as a British order of chivalry. In this he failed, and he also failed during 1839–1841 in an attempt to revive the d'Eyncourt peerage for himself and his heirs. In February 1829 he was elected a Fellow of the Royal Society.

He published, in 1850 a book of poems, Eustace, in memory of his youngest and favourite son who had died abroad; it had the misfortune to appear at the same time as Tennyson's In Memoriam, and suffered greatly by the comparison. Charles thoroughly disapproved of the poetry of his nephew Alfred (Horrid rubbish indeed . . . a discredit to British taste), and the latter's appointment as Poet Laureate in the same year and subsequent offer of a baronetcy caused him outrage and chagrin. He did not live long enough to have to endure a 'Somersby Tennyson' being elevated to the peerage.

== Personal life ==
On 1 January 1808, Tennyson was married to Frances Mary Hutton, the only child and heiress of the Rev. John Hutton, Rector of Lea. Together, they were the parents of five sons and three daughters:

- George Hildeyard Tennyson-d'Eyncourt (1809–1871), who did not marry.
- Edwin Clayton Tennyson-d'Eyncourt (1813–1903), who entered the Royal Navy and became an Admiral; he married Lady Henrietta Pelham-Clinton, a daughter of Henry Pelham-Clinton, 4th Duke of Newcastle.
- Louis Charles Tennyson-d'Eyncourt (1814–1896), who married Sophia Yates, a daughter of John Ashton Yates, MP for County Carlow; they lived at Hadley House in Middlesex.
- Eustace Alexander Tennyson-d'Eyncourt (1816–1842), his favourite son who died unmarried in Barbados of yellow fever.
- Ellen Elizabeth Tennyson-d'Eyncourt (1817–1900), who married Henry Mill Bunbury of Marlston House, High Sheriff of Berkshire.
- William Henry Tennyson-d'Eyncourt (1819–1819), who died in infancy.
- Julia Frances Tennyson-d'Eyncourt (d. 1879), who became a nun at Princethorpe in 1852.
- Clara Maria Tennyson-d'Eyncourt (d. 1863), who married John Hinde Palmer, MP for Lincoln, in 1849.

Tennyson-d'Eyncourt died on 21 July 1861. His widow died in January 1878.

=== Descendants ===
The Tennyson-d'Eyncourt family eventually gained its baronetcy at the beginning of the 20th century and still continues. The most significant member of the family was the naval architect Sir Eustace Tennyson-d'Eyncourt (1868–1951), the 1st Baronet, who was the Royal Navy's Director of Naval Construction in the first decades of the 20th century.

Military offices
| Preceded by Spencer Perceval | Clerk of the Ordnance; 1830–1832 | Succeeded by Thomas Francis Kennedy |
Parliament of the United Kingdom
| Preceded by Sir Robert Heron, Bt; John Peter Grant | Member of Parliament for Great Grimsby; 1818–1826; With: John Nicholas Fazakerley 1818–1820; William Duncombe 1820–1826 | Succeeded by Charles Wood; George Heneage |
| Preceded by Lord Francis Leveson-Gower; Edward Henry Edwardes | Member of Parliament for Bletchingley; 1826–1831; With: William Russell 1826–1827; Hon. William Lamb 1827–1828; William Ewart 1828–1830; Robert William Mills 1830 – February 1831; William Horne February–April 1831; Hon. John Ponsonby April–July 1831 | Succeeded by Thomas Hyde Villiers; Henry John Temple |
| Preceded by Lord Thomas Cecil; Thomas Chaplin | Member of Parliament for Stamford; 1831–1832; With: Lord Thomas Cecil | Succeeded by Thomas Chaplin; George Finch |
| New constituency | Member of Parliament for Lambeth; 1832–1852; With: Benjamin Hawes to 1847; Charles Pearson 1847–1850; William Williams from 1850 | Succeeded by William Arthur Wilkinson; William Williams |
