= Sir James Lawrence, 1st Baronet =

Sir James Clarke Lawrence, 1st Baronet (1820 - 21 May 1897) was Lord Mayor of London and a Liberal politician who sat in the House of Commons from 1868 to 1885.

== Early life and work ==
Lawrence was the son of William Lawrence, an alderman of the City of London, and his wife Jane Clarke, daughter of James Clarke. Lawrence was an alderman and Deputy Lieutenant for the City of London and a J.P. for Middlesex, Surrey and the city of Westminster. From 1862 to 1863 he was Sheriff of London and Middlesex. He was also president of the Bridewell and Bethlehem Hospitals.

== Political career ==
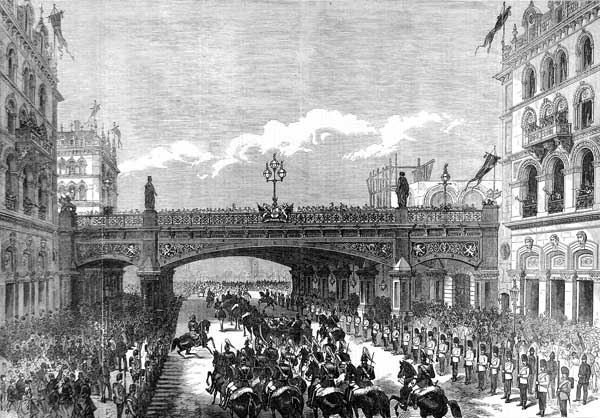
A royal procession under the Holborn Viaduct in 1869.

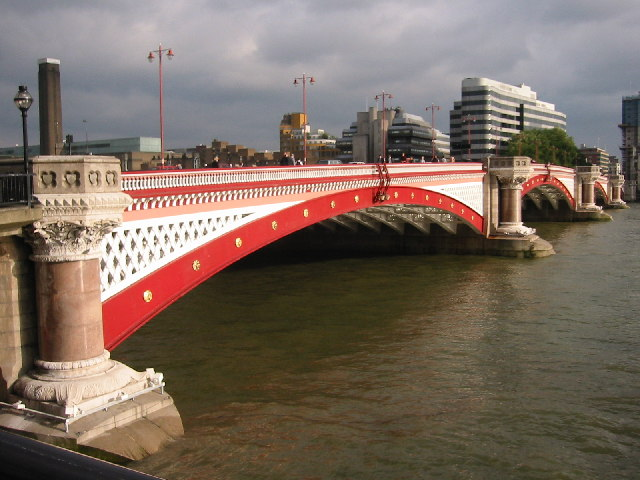
Blackfriars Bridge

Lawrence was elected Member of Parliament for Lambeth at a by-election in 1865, but lost the seat again at the following 1865 general election. In 1868 he became Lord Mayor of London, shortly before he was re-elected for Lambeth at the 1868 general election. He was created a baronet in November 1869 on the opening of Holborn Viaduct and Blackfriars Bridge. Lawrence held the seat at Lambeth until 1885.

In 1886, Lawrence contested the Welsh constituency of West Carmarthenshire as a Liberal Unionist, but was heavily defeated by the sitting Liberal member, W.R.H. Powell.

He and his brother Edwin were of material assistance to the Unitarians, donating a site in Kensington worth £5000, on which a church was built in 1887. The inaugural congregation, started by Theophilus Lindsey in 1774, moved to that location, thus freeing up Essex Street Chapel to be turned into offices and used for the general good of the denomination, as specified by the brothers.

== Personal life ==
Lawrence was married to Agnes Harriette Castle and had one child Theodora. He died at the age of 76. One of his brothers, William Lawrence, was MP for the City of London. Another, Edwin Durning-Lawrence, was M.P. for Truro. His nephew was Frederick Pethick-Lawrence, a pacifist and pro-women's-suffrage MP.

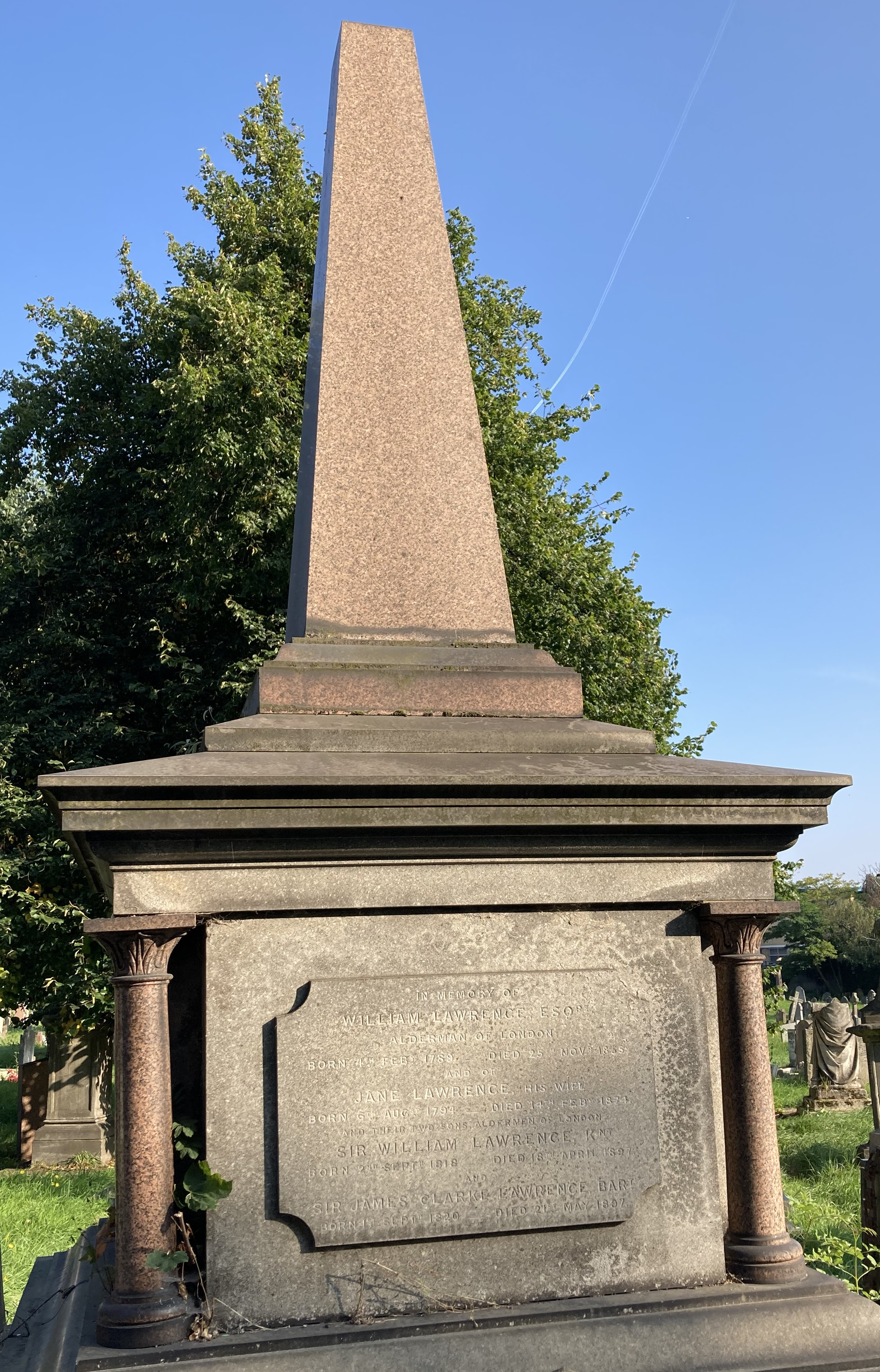
Family vault of James Clarke Lawrence in Kensal Green Cemetery

He is buried in the Lawrence family vault in Kensal Green Cemetery.

Parliament of the United Kingdom
Preceded by William Williams; Frederick Doulton	Member of Parliament for Lambeth; May 1865 – July 1865; With: Frederick Doulton	Succeeded by Thomas Hughes; Frederick Doulton
Preceded by Frederick Doulton; Thomas Hughes	Member of Parliament for Lambeth; 1868 – 1885; With: Sir William McArthur	Constituency abolished
Civic offices
Preceded by William Ferneley Allen	Lord Mayor of London; 1868 – 1869	Succeeded by Robert Besley
Baronetage of the United Kingdom
New creation	Baronet (of Westbourne Terrace); 1869–1897	Extinct
