= Charles Pearson =

English lawyer and reformer (1793–1862)

Charles Pearson (British Lawyer)
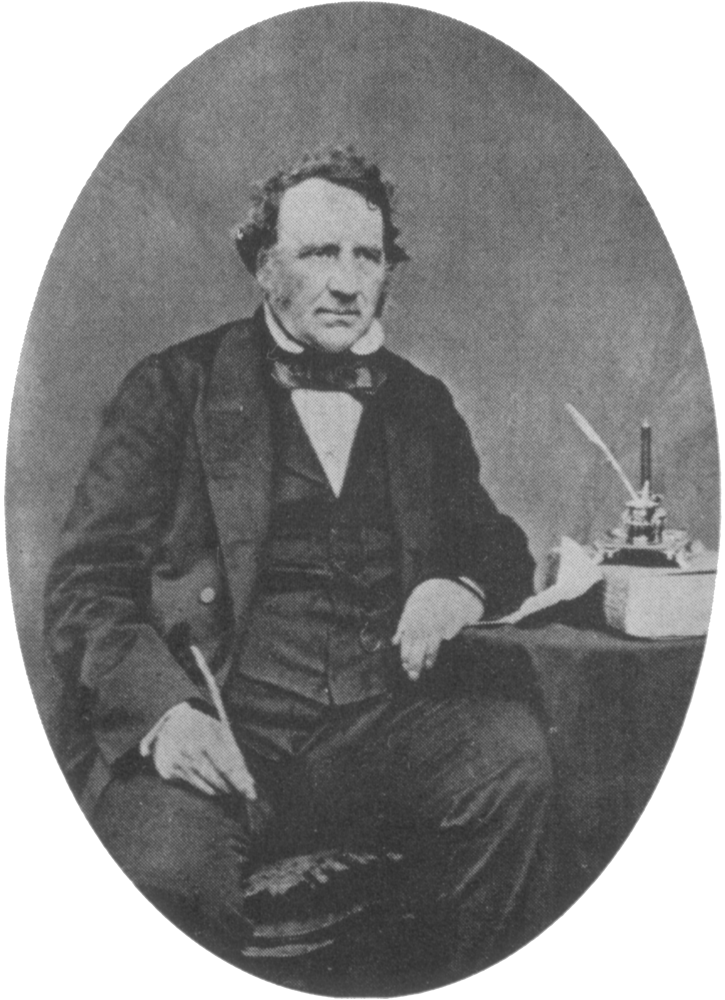
- Pearson, c. 1855

Solicitor to the City of London
- In office 1839–1862

Member of Parliament for Lambeth
- In office 31 July 1847 – July 1850
- Preceded by: Benjamin Hawes
- Succeeded by: William Williams

Councilman of the Corporation of London
- In office 1817–1820
- Constituency: Bishopsgate
- In office 1830–1836
- Constituency: Bishopsgate

Personal details
- Born: 4 October 1793 City of London, England
- Died: 14 September 1862 (aged 68) Wandsworth, England
- Party: Liberal
- Other political affiliations: Radicals
- Spouse: Mary Martha Dutton (m. 1817)
- Children: 1
- Occupation: Lawyer
- Known for: Transport campaigner

Charles Pearson (4 October 1793 – 14 September 1862) was a British lawyer and politician. He was solicitor to the City of London, a reforming campaigner, and – briefly – Liberal Party Member of Parliament for Lambeth. He campaigned against corruption in jury selection, for penal reform, for the abolition of capital punishment, and for universal suffrage.

Pearson used his influence as City Solicitor to promote improvements to transport communications. Initially, he proposed a central railway station for the City, accessed by tunnel, that would be used by multiple railway companies enabling workers to commute to the City from further away. When this plan was rejected, Pearson promoted an underground railway connecting the capital's northern termini. The resulting Metropolitan Railway was the first underground railway in the world and led to the development of the extensive London Underground network and the rapid expansion of the capital.

== Early life ==
Pearson was born on 4 October 1793 at 25 Clement's Lane in the City of London, the son of Thomas Pearson, an upholsterer and feather merchant, and his wife Sarah. After education in Eastbourne, he was apprenticed to his father but instead studied law and qualified as a solicitor in 1816. In 1817, he was released from his indenture by the Haberdashers' Company and married Mary Martha Dutton. The couple had one child, Mary Dutton Pearson, born in 1820.

== City career and campaigning ==
In 1817, Pearson was elected a councilman of the City of London Corporation for Bishopsgate ward and served in that role from 1817 to 1820 and from 1830 to 1836 as well. He served as chairman of the City board of health from 1831 to 1833. In 1839, he gave up his extensive private practice and was appointed City Solicitor, holding that office until his death.

Despite his comfortable upbringing and his high social status, Pearson was a radical, and throughout his life he fought a number of campaigns on progressive and reforming issues including the removal from the Monument inscription blaming the Great Fire of London on Catholics, the abolition of packed special jury lists for political trials, and the overturning of the ban on Jews becoming brokers in the City. Pearson was in favour of the disestablishment of the Church of England and opposed capital punishment. Politically, he supported universal suffrage and electoral reform to balance the sizes of parliamentary constituencies. He unsuccessfully attempted to break the local monopolies developed by the gas companies, calling for the distribution pipework to be owned collectively by the consumers.

Pearson was a Liberal and was elected at the 1847 general election as a Member of Parliament for Lambeth. His campaign was prompted by a desire to promote his penal reform campaign in parliament. He resigned his seat in 1850 thorough the mechanism of accepting the Stewardship of the Chiltern Hundreds.

=== Campaigning for an underground railway ===
Recognising the increasing congestion in the City and its rapidly growing suburbs, Pearson published a pamphlet in 1845 calling for the construction of an underground railway through the Fleet valley to Farringdon. The proposed railway would have been an atmospheric railway with trains pushed through tunnels by compressed air. Although the proposal was ridiculed and came to nothing (and would almost certainly have failed if it had been built, due to the shortcomings of the technology proposed), Pearson continued to lobby for a variety of railway schemes throughout the 1840s and 1850s.

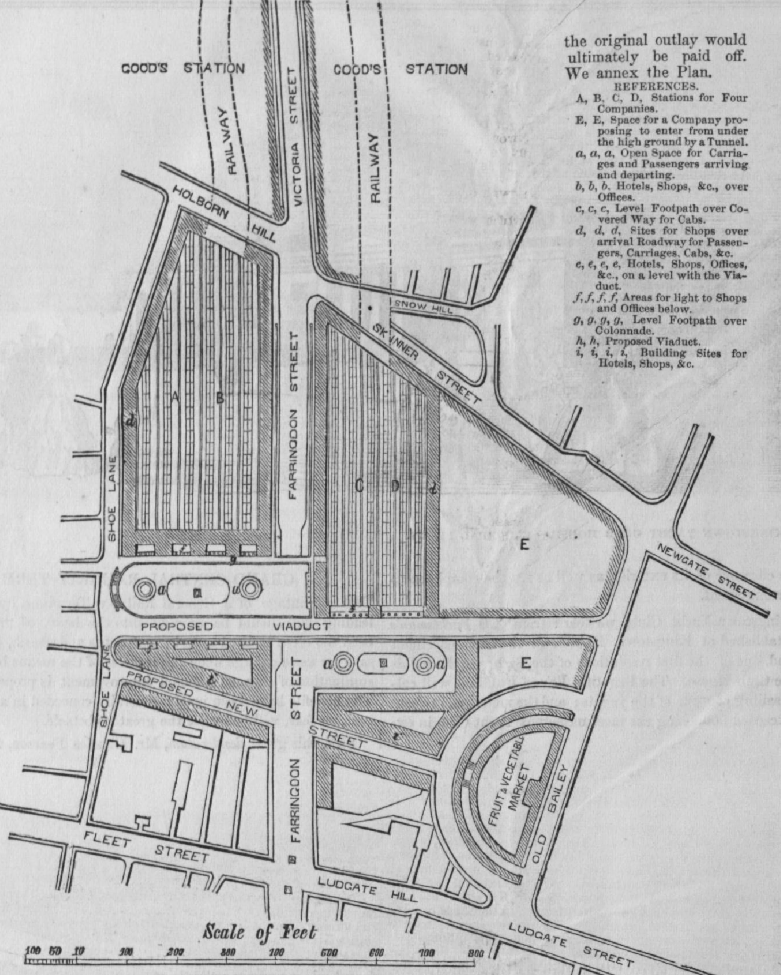
Pearson's proposed central railway terminus between Fleet Street and Holborn Hill with space for five railway companies, 'A', 'B', 'C', 'D' and 'E'.

In 1846, Pearson proposed with the support of the City Corporation a central railway station for London located in Farringdon that was estimated to cost £1 million (approximately £101 million today). The station, to be shared by multiple railway companies, was to be approached from the north in a covered cutting 80 feet (24 m) wide. Pearson's aim in promoting this plan was to facilitate the improvement of the social conditions of City workers by enabling them to commute into London on cheap trains from new residential developments of good quality, cheap homes built outside the capital. The 1846 Royal Commission on Metropolitan Railway Termini rejected the proposal, preferring to confirm a limit around the centre of the capital into which no new railway lines could be extended.

In 1854, a select committee was set up to examine a number of new proposals for railways in London. Pearson made a proposal for a railway connecting the London Termini and presented as evidence the first survey of traffic coming into London which demonstrated the high level of congestion caused by the huge number of carts, cabs and omnibuses filling the roads. Pearson's commentary on this was that:

the overcrowding of the city is caused, first by the natural increase in the population and area of the surrounding district; secondly, by the influx of provincial passengers by the great railways North of London, and the obstruction experienced in the streets by omnibuses and cabs coming from their distant stations, to bring the provincial travellers to and from the heart of the city. I point next to the vast increase of what I may term the migratory population, the population of the city who now oscillate between the country and the city, who leave the City of London every afternoon and return every morning.

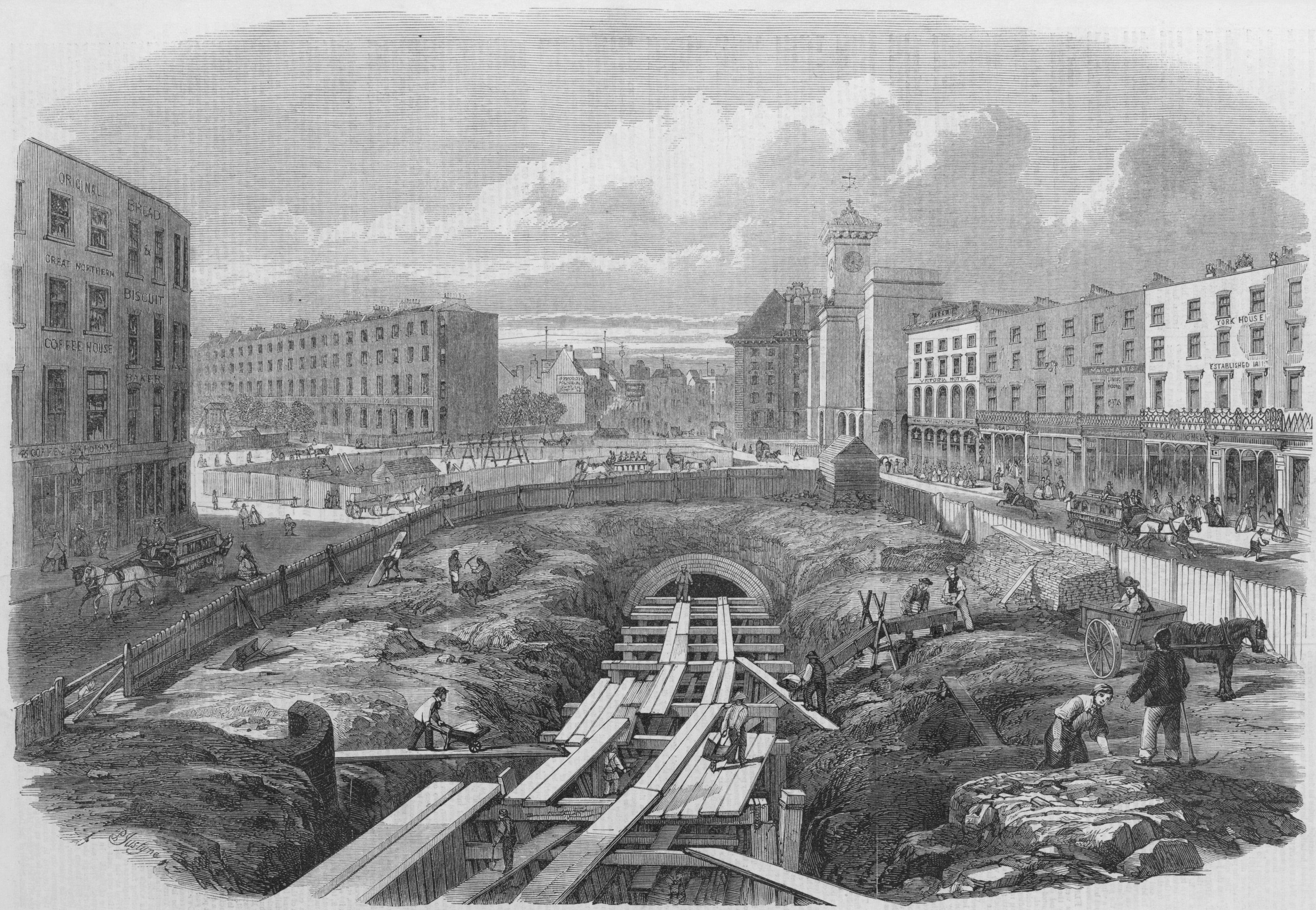
Construction of the Metropolitan Railway close to King's Cross station in 1861

Many of the proposed schemes were rejected, but the Commission did recommend that a railway be constructed linking the termini with the docks and the General Post Office at St. Martin's Le Grand. A private bill for the Metropolitan Railway between Praed Street in Paddington and Farringdon received assent on 7 August 1854.

Although not a director or significant shareholder of the new company, Pearson continued to promote the project over the next few years and use his influence to help the company raise the £1 million of capital needed for the construction of the line. He issued a pamphlet, A twenty minutes letter to the citizens of London, in favour of the Metropolitan Railway and City Station, encouraging investment and he even persuaded the City of London to invest on the basis that the railway would alleviate the City's congestion problems. Once the railway was in operation, the City sold its shares at a profit. By 1860, the funds had been collected and the final route decided. Work on the railway started; taking less than three years to excavate through some of the worst slums of Victorian London and under some of the busiest streets.

Pearson died of dropsy on 14 September 1862 at his home at West Hill, Wandsworth, and did not live to see the opening of the Metropolitan Railway on 10 January 1863. He had refused the offer of a reward from the grateful railway company, but, shortly after the railway's opening, his widow was granted an annuity of £250 per year.

He was buried at West Norwood Cemetery on 23 September 1862.

== Legacy ==
Transport writer Christian Wolmar considers Pearson to have "by far the best claim" to be the first to propose the idea of an underground railway to deal with London's congestion problem. Michael Robbins considers that "without Pearson's constant advocacy–his gadfly conduct, which he managed to combine with holding high office in the City of London–the Metropolitan Railway, the first of its kind in the world, and the nucleus of London's underground system, could not have come into existence when it did."

When it opened, the Metropolitan Railway had a significant impact on street traffic, particularly cabs and omnibuses but these quickly recovered to near their former levels, despite the Metropolitan Railway also carrying over 9 million passengers in its first year of operation. The Metropolitan Railway and the network of underground lines that grew from it was the first in the world and the idea was not adopted elsewhere until 1896 when the Budapest Metro and the Glasgow Subway were both opened. Without Pearson's promotion of the idea of an underground railway when he did it is possible that transport developments at the end of the 19th century developments, such as electric trams and vehicles powered by internal combustion engines, might have meant the underground solution was ignored. The expansion of the capital that the underground network and its suburban surface extensions enabled was considerable and rapid and helped the population of what is now Greater London to increase from 3,094,391 in 1861 to 6,226,494 in 1901.

== Bibliography ==
- Craig, F. W. S. (1989) [1977]. British parliamentary election results 1832–1885 (2nd ed.). Chichester: Parliamentary Research Services. ISBN 0-900178-26-4.
- Harter, Jim (2005). World Railways of the Nineteenth Century – A Pictorial history in Victorian Engravings. Johns Hopkins University Press. ISBN 0-8018-8089-0.
- Pearson, Charles (1844). The Substance of an Address Delivered by Charles Pearson, Esq. at a Public Meeting on the 11th, 12th and 18th of December 1843. Pelham Richardson & John Ollivier.
- Robbins, Michael (2004). "Pearson, Charles (1793–1862)". Oxford Dictionary of National Biography (online ed.). Oxford University Press. doi:10.1093/ref:odnb/38367. (Subscription, Wikipedia Library access or UK public library membership required.)
- Simmons, Jack (2002) [1973]. "The Power of the Railway". In Dyos, H. J; Wolff, Michael (eds.). The Victorian City. Routledge. ISBN 0-415-19323-0.
- Wolmar, Christian (2004). The Subterranean Railway: How the London Underground Was Built and How It Changed the City Forever. Atlantic Books. ISBN 1-84354-023-1.

Parliament of the United Kingdom
Preceded by Charles Tennyson; Benjamin Hawes	Member of Parliament for Lambeth; 1847–1850; With: Charles Tennyson	Succeeded by Charles Tennyson; William Williams
