= William McArthur (lord mayor of London) =

Anglo-Irish businessman and Liberal Party politician

The Right Honourable Sir William McArthur KCMG JP DL
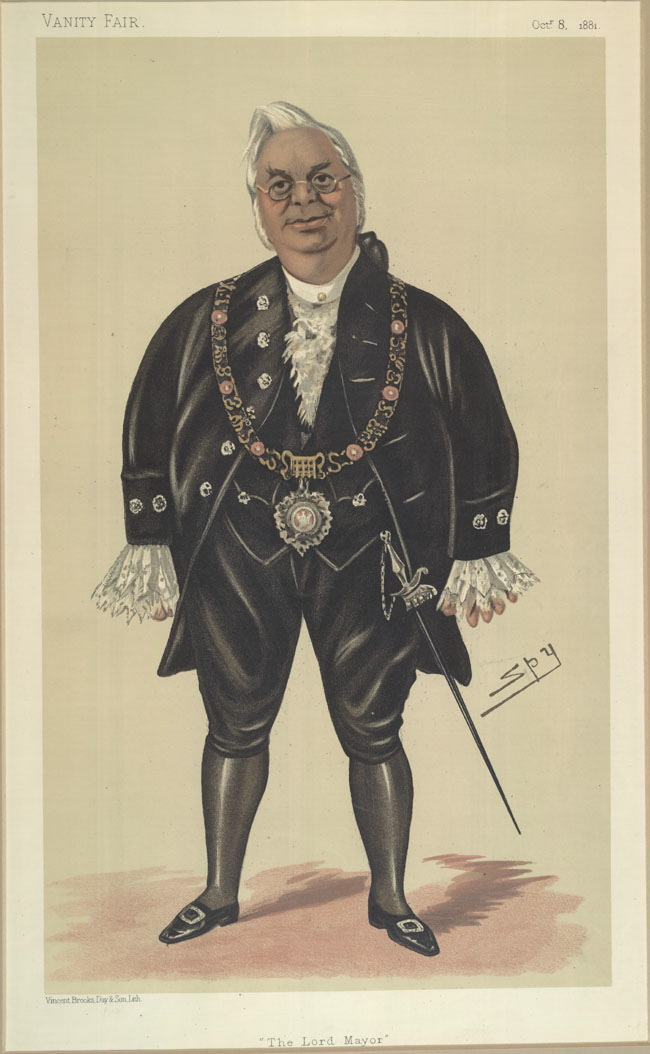
- William McArthur's caricature by Spy published in Vanity Fair in 1881.

Member of the British Parliament for Lambeth
- In office 8 December 1868 – 18 December 1885 Serving with Sir James Lawrence, Bt
- Preceded by: Thomas Hughes
- Succeeded by: Constituency abolished

Lord Mayor of London
- In office 1 January 1880 – 31 December 1880
- Preceded by: Francis Wyatt Truscott
- Succeeded by: John Whittaker Ellis

Personal details
- Born: 6 July 1809 Malin, Ireland
- Died: 16 November 1887 (aged 78) Derry, Ireland
- Resting place: West Norwood Cemetery, London, England
- Party: Liberal
- Profession: Businessman, manager

Sir William McArthur, KCMG JP DL (6 July 1809 – 16 November 1887) was an Anglo-Irish businessman and Lord Mayor of London, and a Liberal Party politician who sat in the House of Commons from 1868 to 1885.

== Biography ==
McArthur was born at Malin in Inishowen, County Donegal. He was the fifth child, and first surviving son, of John McArthur, a poor Scots-Irish farmer who had converted to the Methodists from his Scots-Irish Presbyterianism in the 1790s, and subsequently became a Methodist minister in Derry. In 1821 he was apprenticed to a woollen draper in Enniskillen. He moved to Lurgan in 1825 where he was a merchant and in 1831 established a drapery business in Derry initially in a partnership, but later on his own. In 1841 his brother Alexander McArthur went to Australia and the business was trading with several destinations in Australia. McArthur became an alderman of Derry.

In 1857 McArthur moved the business to the City of London. He became a director of the Star Life Assurance Society in 1861, and chairman of that company in 1872, a post he held until his death. It was under his chairmanship that the Star participated in the syndicate organized by Robert William Perks to provide financial support to the Barry Dock and Railway Company in 1887. He was also a director of the City Bank, the Bank of Australasia and the Australian Telegraph Co. He was a JP for Surrey and a Deputy Lieutenant for the City of London.

McArthur was involved in the opening of Methodist College Belfast in 1865. At the 1865 general election McArthur stood unsuccessfully for Parliament in Pontefract. From 1867 to 1868 he was Sheriff of London and Middlesex. At the 1868 general election McArthur was elected as a member of parliament (MP) for Lambeth, and held the seat until borough was divided under the Redistribution of Seats Act 1885. He was elected an alderman of London for Coleman Street in 1872 and became Lord Mayor of London in 1880. He was one of the founders of the London Chamber of Commerce in 1881 and was made KCMG in 1882.

At the 1885 general election, McArthur stood as an Independent Liberal candidate in the new Newington West, but finished a poor third with 821 votes (16%). During 1886 he broke with Gladstone, and sided with the Liberal Unionists.

He had several interests in social and reforming organisations, including the Orphan Working School of Haverstock Hill and Hornsey Rise, and the Aborigines' Protection Society. In 1883 he opened Centenary Hall, Cottington Street, Kennington, and is remembered on a commemorative stone.

McArthur died (aged 78) on the morning of 16 November 1887 in a carriage of the Metropolitan Railway near Paddington, while travelling into the City to chair a board meeting of the Star Life Assurance Society. The inquest found that his death had been caused by "syncope of the heart, brought on by over-exertion in hurrying for the train". In January 1888 his brother Alexander was elected to fill the vacant seat on that company`s board, and William Mewburn was elected the company`s chairman. Sir William McArthur was buried in Norwood cemetery. Sir William left sums for Methodist College Belfast to build its girls boarding hall. McArthur married Marianne McElwaine in 1843.

Parliament of the United Kingdom
Preceded by Frederick Doulton; Thomas Hughes	Member of Parliament for Lambeth; 1868 – 1885; With: Sir James Lawrence, Bt	Constituency abolished
Civic offices
Preceded by Sir Francis Wyatt Truscott	Lord Mayor of London; 1880–1881	Succeeded by Sir John Whittaker Ellis, Bt
