= John Doulton =

English businessman

John Doulton (17 November 1793 – 26 May 1873) was an English businessman and manufacturer of pottery, a founder of the firm that later became known as Royal Doulton. John Doulton married Jane Duneau, a widow from Bridgnorth in Shropshire, who died on 9 April 1841. They had eight children, including Sir Henry, MP Frederick, Josiah and Alfred.

== Biography ==
In 1815, soon after John Doulton had completed his apprenticeship as a potter at the Fulham Pottery in London, he invested his life savings of £100 in the Vauxhall Walk pottery of Martha Jones, Lambeth. Her foreman, John Watts, was also taken into partnership and the firm became known as Jones, Watts and Doulton. It specialized in industrial ware, brown stoneware, drain pipes as well as stoneware bottles for chemicals, beer, and other industrial liquids among others. Martha Jones withdrew from the partnership in 1820 and the company moved to new premises in Lambeth High Street in 1826. In 1835 John's 15-year-old son Henry Doulton was taken on as an apprentice.

By 1846, Henry had set up an independent Lambeth Pottery which had become the leader in industrial products, particularly sanitation products. Following the retirement of John Watts in 1853, Doulton and Watts merged with Henry's company to become Doulton and Company and was highly recognised for its lines of hand decorated figurines, vases and dinnerware.

== Bibliography ==
- Eyles, D. (1965), Royal Doulton, 1815–1965: The Rise and Expansion of the Royal Doulton Potteries, London: Hutchinson
- Eyles, D.; Irvine, L. (2002), The Doulton Lambeth wares (2nr rev ed.), London: Richard Dennis, ISBN 0-903685-79-5
- Eyles, D.; et al. (1994), Royal Doulton Figures: Produced at Burslem, Staffordshire, c1890-1994 (3rd rev ed.), London: Richard Dennis, ISBN 0-903685-35-3
