= John Badcock (cricketer) =

English cricketer

Personal information
- Full name: John Badcock
- Born: 4 October 1883; Christchurch, Hampshire, England
- Died: 24 August 1940 (aged 56); Marylebone, London, England
- Height: 6 ft 0 in (1.83 m)
- Batting: Right-handed
- Bowling: Right-arm fast

Domestic team information
- Years: Team
- 1906–1908: Hampshire

Career statistics
Competition	First-class
Matches	63
Runs scored	1,199
Batting average	14.44
100s/50s	–/2
Top score	74
Balls bowled	9,157
Wickets	212
Bowling average	25.53
5 wickets in innings	12
10 wickets in match	3
Best bowling	8/44
Catches/stumpings	30/–
- Source: Cricinfo, 15 February 2010

John Badcock (4 October 1883 — 24 August 1940) was an English first-class cricketer.

Badcock was born in October 1883 at Christchurch, Hampshire. As a young cricketer, he was associated with the Kent County Young Players' eleven, but ultimately signed for Hampshire in February 1906 at the age of 22. He made his debut in first-class cricket for Hampshire against Surrey at The Oval in the 1906 County Championship. His first season was considered a success, with Badcock taking 96 wickets with his right-arm fast bowling at an average of 24.81, in addition to claiming seven five wicket hauls. Whilst not as effective in the following season, he nonetheless took 49 wickets from 21 matches at an average of 26.08, though he did not manage to take more than four wickets in an innings. In 1907, he once again played in 21 matches, taking 67 wickets at an average of 26.17; he took five wickets in an innings on five occasions, which included his career best bowling figures of 8 for 44, taken against Sussex at Portsmouth. During this season, he also took ten wickets in a match on three occasions. Despite doubts over his fitness (he weighed over 16 stone), Hampshire offered Badcock a two-year contract and a trainer to improve his fitness, however he declined the offer and left at the end of the 1908 season to manage a cinema in London. In 63 first-class appearances, he took 212 wickets at an average of 25.53. As a lower order batsman, he scored 1,199 runs at a batting average of 14.44; he scored two half centuries, with a top-score of 74. Badcock died at Marylebone in August 1940.
