= William Hawes (physician) =

English physician and philanthropist (1736–1808)

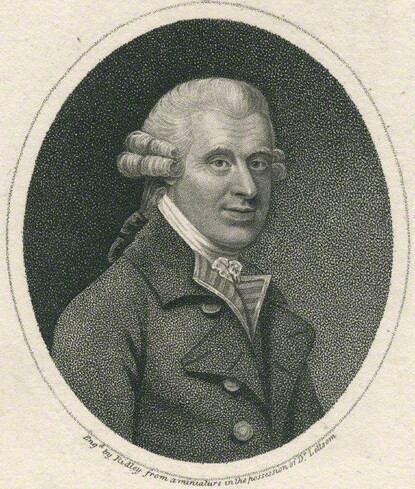
- 1802 engraving of Hawes by William Ridley
- Born: 28 November 1736; London, England
- Died: 5 December 1808 (aged 72); London, England
- Education: St Paul's School, London; Marischal College
- Occupation(s): Physician, philanthropist
- Known for: Spreading the practice of resuscitation and co-founding the Royal Humane Society
- Spouse: Sarah Fox (m. 1759)
- Children: 9
- Relatives: Benjamin Hawes (grandson); William Hawes (grandson)

William Hawes (28 November 1736 – 5 December 1808) was an English physician and philanthropist, and one of the founders of the Royal Humane Society. He worked to spread the practice of resuscitation, and to relieve poverty in East London.

== Life ==
William Hawes was born in Islington, London, on 28 November 1736, and was first educated at John Shield's academy, and afterwards at St Paul's School, London. After passing some time as an apprentice of Mr. Robert Carsan, a medical practitioner of Vauxhall, he became assistant to a Mr. Dicks in the Strand and eventually succeeded him in his practice.

Around 1773, Hawes became well known as a campaigner for the possibility of resuscitating persons apparently dead from drowning, or other causes of asphyxia. For a year he offered a reward to anyone who brought to him, or his supporters, the body of a person who had been taken out of the River Thames unconscious, within a reasonable time after immersion. The reward was paid whether the attempt to resuscitate proved successful or not. Thomas Cogan, who translated in 1773 an account of an Amsterdam society for the resuscitation of the apparently drowned, thought that Hawes should not pay all the rewards, and it was arranged in 1774 that he and Cogan should each bring 15 friends to the Chapter Coffeehouse on Paternoster Row to consider further operations. This was done, and at the meeting "The Institution for affording immediate relief to persons apparently dead from drowning" was formed, later renamed the Humane Society, and acquiring the "Royal" prefix in 1787. In the following years, Hawes worked as the organisation's secretary, registrar and treasurer.

In 1779 Hawes received his MD degree from Marischal College, Aberdeen, in 1779. Hawes was also physician to the London Dispensary. From 1791, he lived in Spital Square, and in 1793 worked to alleviate the distress which then was found among the Spitalfields weavers. He died on 5 December 1808. He was buried at St Mary's Churchyard, Islington on 13 December 1808.

== Works ==
Hawes authored the following works:

- An Account of Dr. Goldsmith's Illness, 1774. Oliver Goldsmith had consulated Hawes as apothecary, but against his advice continued to self-medicate with Dr James's "fever powder".
- An Examination of the Rev. John Wesley's Primitive Physic, 1776; 3rd ed. 1780.
- An Address on Premature Death and Premature Interment, 1777.
- An Address to the Public on the Dangerous Custom of laying out persons as soon as Respiration ceases, with a Reply by W. Renwick, and Observations on that Reply, 1778.
- An Address to the Legislature on the importance of a Humane Society, 1781.
- An Address to the King and Parliament of Great Britain on the important subject of preserving the Lives of its Inhabitants, 1782; 3rd ed., with Observations on the General Bills of Mortality, 1783.
- The Transactions of the Royal Humane Society from 1774 to 1784, with an Appendix of Miscellaneous Observations on Suspended Animation to the year 1794.

== Family ==
Hawes married Sarah Fox (1740–1814) in 1759; they had nine children, including:

- Harriot (bap. 1760)
- Sophia (bap. 1762, died 1828), married in 1790 Russell Scott (1761–1833), a nonconformist minister in Portsmouth and brother of Mary Scott. Their daughter Sophia Russell Scott married her first cousin John Edward Taylor, son of Mary Scott and founder of the Manchester Guardian; and her brother Russell (1810–1880) was father of C. P. Scott, editor of The Guardian.
- The eldest son, Thomas (bap. 1765, died 1849), a magistrate, was partner with his brother Benjamin in the soapworks at the New Barge House, Lambeth.
- Maria, or Mary Ann (bap. 1767, died 1849), married in 1797 John Gurney.
- Sarah (b. 1773)
- William (b. 1774)
- Benjamin (1770–1861), the father of Benjamin Hawes (1797–1862) and William Hawes (1805–1885).
