= Thomas Hughes =

English author and politician (1822–1896)

Thomas Hughes QC
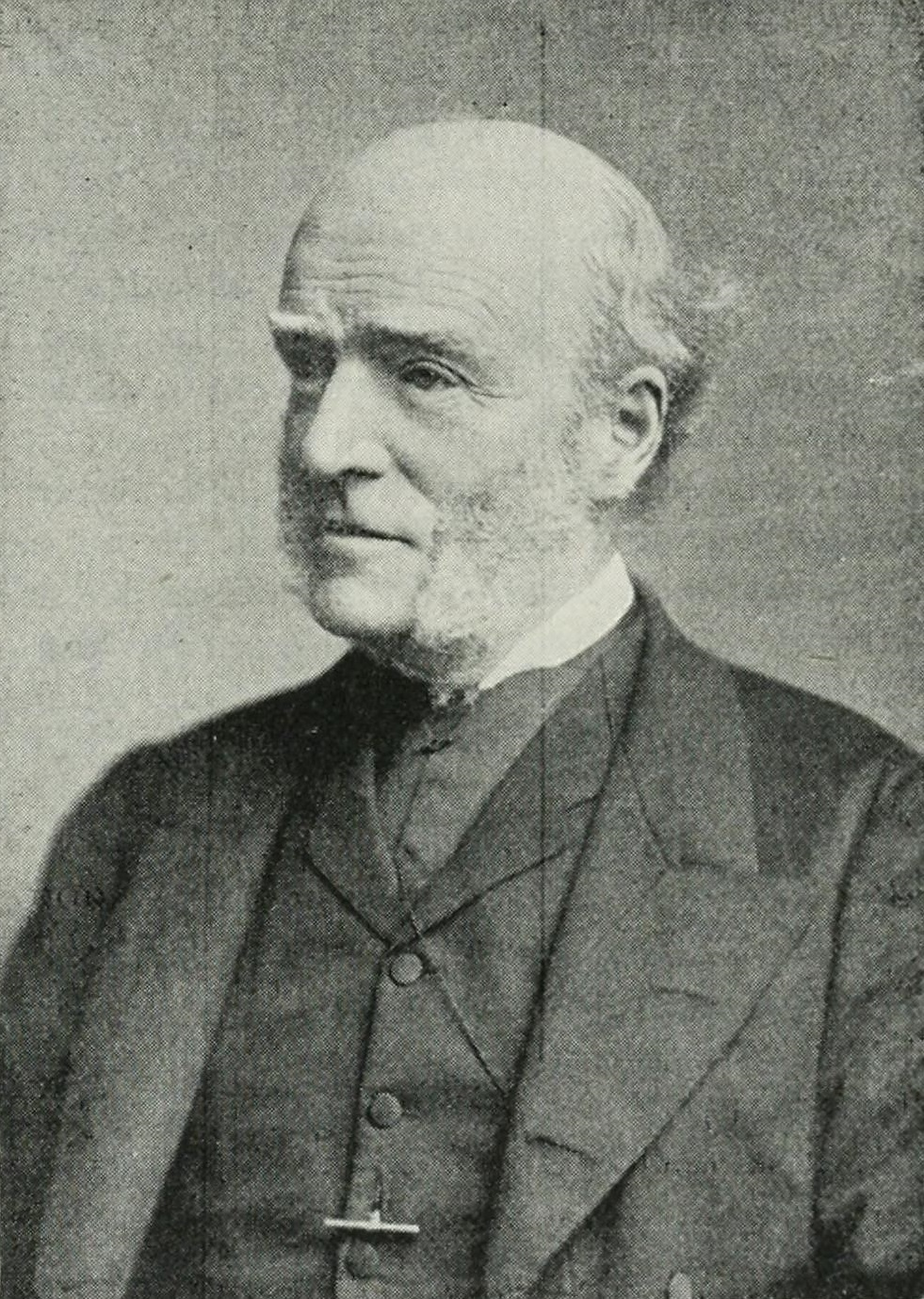
- Thomas Hughes
- Born: 20 October 1822; Uffington, Berkshire (now Oxfordshire), England
- Died: 22 March 1896 (aged 73); Brighton, East Sussex, England
- Education: Oriel College, Oxford
- Occupations: Lawyer, writer, reformer
- Writing career
- Pen name: Vacuus Viator
- Period: Nineteenth century
- Genre: Children's literature

Thomas Hughes QC (20 October 1822 – 22 March 1896) was an English barrister, judge, politician and author. He is most famous for his novel Tom Brown's School Days (1857), a semi-autobiographical work set at Rugby School, which Hughes and his brother had attended. It had a lesser-known sequel, Tom Brown at Oxford (1861).

Hughes had numerous other interests, in particular as a Member of Parliament, in the British co-operative movement, and in a settlement—Rugby, Tennessee, US—reflecting his values.

== Early life ==
Hughes was the second son of John Hughes, editor of the Boscobel Tracts (1830), and was born in Uffington, Berkshire (now in Oxfordshire). He had six brothers, and one sister, Jane Senior, who later became Britain's first female civil servant. At the age of eight he was sent to Twyford School, a prep school near Winchester, where he remained until the age of eleven. In February 1834 he went to Rugby School, which was then under the celebrated Thomas Arnold, a contemporary of his father at Oriel College, Oxford.

Hughes excelled at sports rather than in scholarship, and his school career culminated in a cricket match at Lord's Cricket Ground. In 1842 he went on to Oriel College, and graduated BA in 1845. At Oxford, he played cricket for the Oxford University Cricket Club in the annual University Match against Cambridge, also played at Lord's, a match still regarded as first-class cricket.

== Legal career ==
Hughes was called to the bar in 1848, became a Queen's Counsel in 1869 and a bencher in 1870. He was appointed as a county court judge in the Chester district in July 1882.

== Social interests ==
A committed social reformer, Hughes became involved in the Christian socialism movement led by Frederick Maurice, which he joined in 1848. In January 1854 he was one of the founders of the Working Men's College in Great Ormond Street, and was the college's principal from 1872 to 1883.

In 1850, Hughes gave evidence to a House of Commons committee on savings. In so doing, he participated in a Christian Socialist initiative, which led shortly to the Industrial and Provident Societies Partnership Act 1852 and the emergence of the industrial and provident society. The Act was the work of Robert Aglionby Slaney, with whom Hughes worked in alliance.

Hughes was involved also in the formation of some early trade unions, and helped finance the printing of Liberal publications; and acted as the first President of the Co-operative Congress in 1869, serving on the Co-operative Central Board. He invested with William Romaine Callender in co-operative mills, in 1866.

== In politics ==
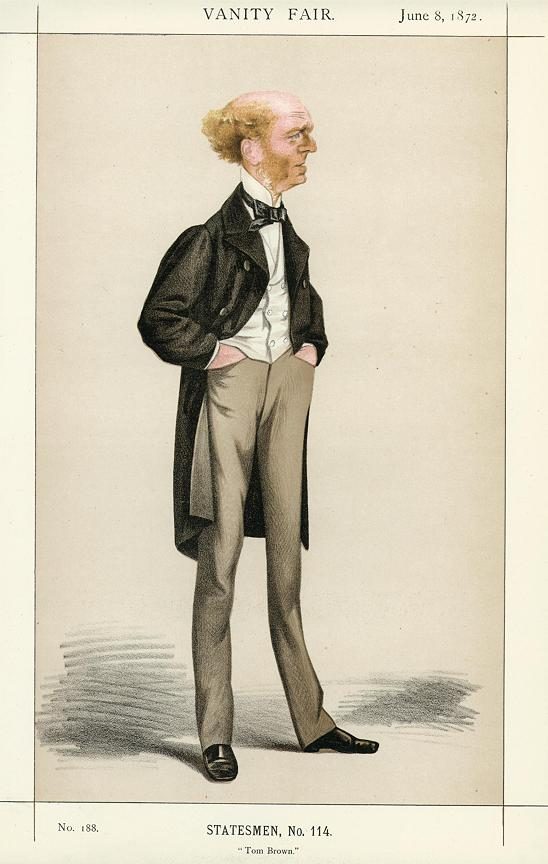
Caricature by Adriano Cecioni published in Vanity Fair in 1872.

Hughes was elected to Parliament as a Liberal for Lambeth (1865–68), and for Frome (1868–74). He stood as candidate in 1874 for Marylebone in 1874, but dropped out just before the election, despite support from Octavia Hill. The context for the end of his political career was the unpopularity with Hughes's Frome constituents of his support for the Elementary Education Act 1870.

As an MP, Hughes worked on trade union legislation, but was not in a position to have major changes passed. He had greater success in improving the legal position of co-operatives, which in particular became able to operate as a limited company. The issue of legal obstacles to the operation of labour unions was topical, and in 1867 Hughes was made a member of a Royal Commission set up to consider the matter. Initially he was the only one on the committee sympathetic to the union point of view; after some lobbying he was joined by Frederic Harrison, and a concession was made to union representatives, allowing them observer places in the proceedings. Hughes then worked with Harrison and Robert Applegarth to diminish the effect of some of the testimony from employers.

The outcome of this commission was that Harrison, Hughes and Lord Lichfield produced a minority report (1869), recommending that all the legal restrictions should be dropped. Then the matter was raised again in a second Commission, at the end of Hughes's time in Parliament. At that point Alexander Macdonald used a minority report to refer back to Hughes's earlier view; but Hughes signed the majority report. It advocated amendment of the Master and Servant Act 1867, but little substantive change to the Criminal Law Amendment Act 1871 and the law of conspiracy.

== Volunteers ==
During the French invasion scare of 1859, Hughes raised the 19th (Bloomsbury) Middlesex Rifle Volunteer Corps from among the students of the Working Men's College, and commanded it with the rank of Lieutenant-Colonel until 1869, when he became the unit's first Honorary Colonel. The battalion was known as 'Tom Brown's Corps'. Hughes estimated that it was the poorest in the metropolis, the Rifle Volunteer Corps at the time being predominantly middle class. He also served as deputy editor of the Volunteer Services Gazette.

== Later life ==
In 1878–79, Hughes began writing The Manual for Co-operators (1881), with Vansittart Neale, for the Co-operative Congress. As a side-product he developed an interest in the model village. In 1880, he acquired the ownership of Franklin W. Smith's Plateau City and founded a settlement in America—Rugby, Tennessee—which was designed as an experiment in utopian living for the younger sons of the English gentry. It followed closely on the failed colony of Buckthorn (existing about 1872 to 1879), established by another Englishman, Charles Lempriere, in western Virginia; this settlement is reported to have been suggested by Hughes. Rugby was also unsuccessful on its own terms, but it still exists and is listed on the US National Register of Historic Places.

Hughes was also a prominent figure in the anti-opium movement, and a member of the Society for the Suppression of the Opium Trade.

At the end of the 1880s Hughes clashed with John Thomas Whitehead Mitchell of the Co-operative Wholesale Society, over the vertical integration Mitchell favoured for the Society. Hughes died in 1896 aged 73, at Brighton, of heart failure, and was buried there.

== Works ==
While living at Wimbledon, Hughes wrote his famous story Tom Brown's School Days, which was published in April 1857. He is associated with the novelists of the "muscular school", a loose classification but centred on the fiction of the Crimean War period. Although Hughes had never been a member of the sixth form at Rugby, his brother George Hughes was educated there and was the model for his Tom Brown character. Both of them had great respect for the school's headmaster, Thomas Arnold.

Hughes also wrote The Scouring of the White Horse (1859), a novel which centres on the village festival of 1857 which saw to the periodic cleaning of the Uffington White Horse. The book deals with Victorian rural life, traditional sports, and local folklore. Other works include Tom Brown at Oxford (1861), Religio Laici (1868), Life of Alfred the Great (1869) and Memoir of a Brother.

== Family ==
In 1847, Hughes married Frances Ford, daughter of Rev. James Ford, and niece of Richard Ford, and they settled in 1853 at Wimbledon. Their house there was built by the North London Working Builders' Association, a Christian Socialist co-operative; and was shared with J. M. F. Ludlow and his family; Ludlow already shared barristers' chambers with Hughes, and the arrangement lasted four years. There were five sons (Maurice, James, George, John, and Arthur) and four daughters (Lilian, Evie, Caroline and Mary) of the marriage.

Lilian Hughes perished in the sinking of the RMS Titanic in 1912, along with her husband, Rev. Ernest Carter. The youngest child Mary Hughes was a well-known Poor Law guardian and volunteer visitor to the local Poor Law infirmary and children's home.

== Legacy ==
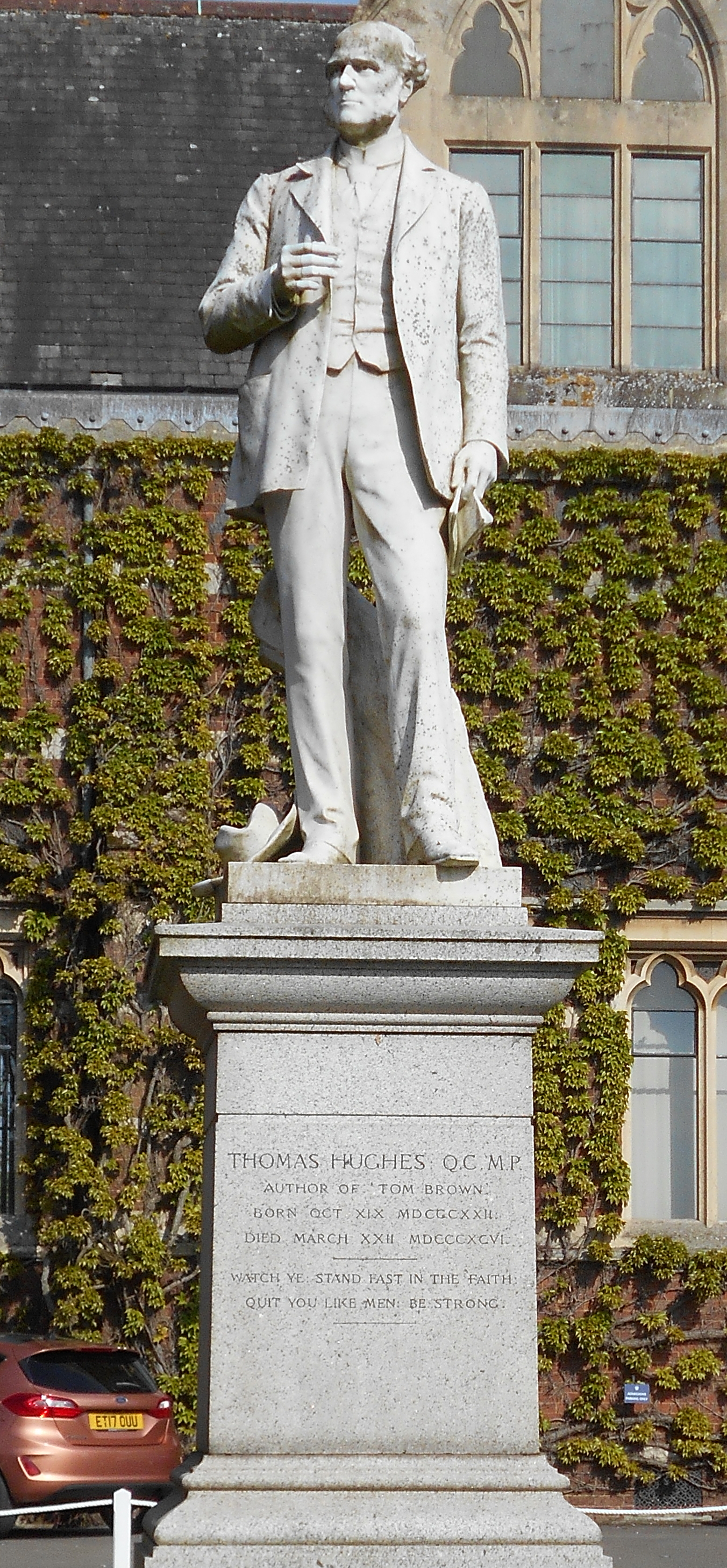
Statue of Thomas Hughes at Rugby School

A Hughes Scholarship was founded at Oriel College, Oxford. It was a closed award, open only to members, or sons of members, of some Co-operative Societies, in which aspect the award reflected Hughes's involvement with the Co-operative Movement. The first scholar was elected to Oriel in 1884. It was later combined with an award honouring the social reformer Edward Vansittart Neale.

A statue of Hughes (pictured right) stands outside Rugby School Library: the sculptor was Thomas Brock, and the statue was unveiled in 1899.

== Bibliography ==
=== Fiction ===
- Tom Brown's School Days (1857)
- The Scouring of The White Horse (1859)
- Tom Brown at Oxford (1861)

=== Non-fiction ===
- Religio Laici (1861)
- A Layman's Faith (1868)
- Alfred the Great (1870). In the Sunday Library for Household Reading, this was a largely political work, and was history verging on fiction.
- Memoir of a Brother (1873)
- The Old Church; What Shall We Do With It? (1878)
- The Manliness of Christ (1879)
- True Manliness (1880)
- Rugby Tennessee (1881)
- Memoir of Daniel Macmillan (1882)
- G.T.T. Gone to Texas (1884)
- Notes for Boys (1885)
- Life and Times of Peter Cooper (1886)
- James Fraser Second Bishop of Manchester (1887)
- David Livingstone (1889)
- Vacation Rambles (1895)
- Early Memories for the Children (1899)

Parliament of the United Kingdom
Preceded by Frederick Doulton; James Lawrence	Member of Parliament for Lambeth; 1865 – 1868; With: Frederick Doulton	Succeeded by William McArthur; James Lawrence
Preceded by Sir Henry Rawlinson, Bt.	Member of Parliament for Frome; 1868 – 1874	Succeeded by Henry Lopes
