= Russell Scott (merchant) =

English coal merchant (1801-1880)

- Born: 1801; England
- Died: 1880 (aged 78–79)
- Occupation: Businessperson
- Known for: Philanthropist and newspaper proprietor
- Spouse: Isabella Civil Prestwich (m. 1832)
- Children: 9
- Father: Russell Scott (minister)

Russell Scott (1801–1880) was an English coal merchant, philanthropist and newspaper proprietor.

== Early life ==
The son of Russell Scott, a Unitarian minister at Portsmouth and younger brother of Mary Scott, he was baptised by Theophilus Lindsey at the house of his maternal grandfather William Hawes.

Scott in 1818 went to work on the accountancy side of William Cory & Co., a firm in which his parents had invested through the Hawes family connection. In 1822, through a change in a partnership involving Hawes family members, Scott became a partner with William Cory in the coal merchants Cory & Scott, of New Barge House Wharf, Lambeth. In the early 1830s Cory & Scott had 23 barges and 5% of the seacoal trade that brought coal from the Northumberland Coalfield along the coast to London. In 1838 the partnership was dissolved.

Scott was bought out by Cory, and turned to philanthropy. He invested much of his capital in railways.

The company continued as Wm. Cory & Son, coal importers and shipowners, incorporated in 1896, and was a precursor of the Cory company.

== The Manchester Guardian ==
In 1824, Scott's sister Sophia Russell Scott married John Edward Taylor, founding editor of the Manchester Guardian; this was a first-cousin marriage, Taylor's mother being Russell Scott's sister Mary. Russell Scott became a close friend of Taylor, and invested money in the Manchester Guardian. In 1825 Taylor bought the Manchester Mercury and another newspaper, and Ayerst believes he was able to do that with a loan from Scott.

Taylor died in 1844, and under the terms of his will Russell Scott became proprietor of the Manchester Guardian, until the two sons Russell Scott Taylor and John Edward Taylor II came of age: when each turned 22 they were to be offered a half-share in the newspaper. Russell Scott Taylor died about the time when he came of age, leaving John Edward Taylor II (1830–1905) to take control. Russell Scott was one of the group financing a loan to allow the drop in price from tuppence to one penny in 1857, a successful business move.

When Taylor was looking to step down as editor of the Manchester Guardian around 1870, he chose C. P. Scott, Scott's youngest son, an Oxford graduate in 1869.

== Later life ==
Grace Anne Prestwich, wife and biographer of Scott's brother-in-law Joseph Prestwich, wrote that Scott had left business with a "very considerable fortune". Around 1846 he and his wife moved to Summer Hill near Bath.

Scott supported, around 1850, the scheme of Mary Carpenter to set up an industrial school in school premises at Kingswood once used by John Wesley. Scott bought the school, and Lady Byron provided furniture. He was interested in juvenile delinquency and had visited the Rauhes Haus in Hamburg.

== Family ==
Scott married in 1832 Isabella Civil Prestwich, daughter of the wine merchant Joseph Prestwich and his wife Catherine Blakeway, and sister of Joseph Prestwich FRS. They had nine children. The children included:

- Russell Scott, eldest son, died 1908; father of Geoffrey Scott
- Lawrence Scott, third son, died 1930, minister
- Charles Prestwich Scott, fourth son, newspaper editor.
- Isabella died 1932, aged 89, unmarried

After Scott's death, his widow Isabella, his son Lawrence and others funded the building of the Russell Scott Schools in Denton, which opened in 1882. They were adjacent to the Unitarian chapel where Lawrence Scott was minister, but were non-denominational. They were demolished in 1986, having closed in 1981. The name continued in a primary school built nearby.
