= John Feltham =

English writer

John Feltham (fl. 1780–1803) was an English writer, particularly for travel and antiquarian works. He is known for the Picture of London, an annual guide book that appeared from around 1800.

== Life ==
Feltham has been tentatively identified as the son of Thomas Hall Feltham, a clockmaker in Salisbury. He took work in the West Country, and lived for a time in Honiton, in east Devon. There he encountered Eliza Gould, who was running a school at South Molton, elsewhere in the same county. They became involved, and engaged in 1795, but he broke it off, and did not give financial support to her school as she certainly had hoped. After 1796, he moved to Salisbury, and then in 1799 to London. He died by 1815.

== Works ==
Feltham contributed to the Gentleman's Magazine from 1786, and wrote a letter on animal rights in the European Magazine in 1796, that responded to Mary Wollstonecraft. He also contributed poems to an anthology by Richard Polwhele.

A Tour Through the Island of Mann (1798) [sic] was a travel work, about the Isle of Man. Feltham and his patron Joseph Haskins had undertaken a large-scale walking tour in 1797, and this book resulted from part of it. It was edited with notes by Robert Airey for the Manx Society, in 1861, as Feltham's Tour through the Isle of Man, in 1797 and 1798. A work on monumental inscriptions in the Isle of Man was published for the first time in 1868.

The Picture of London, an annual guide book, appeared by 1802, an edition that is noted in particular for a historical dissertation, "The Porter Brewery", on the drink porter. An influential account, attributing to Ralph Harwood in 1722 the origination of this variety of beer, it is no longer given much credence. An edition by John Britton, The Original Picture of London, appeared in 1826, but the title had become generic soon after Feltham died. John Badcock had published A Living Picture of London in 1818. Leigh's New Picture of London (Samuel Leigh) also appeared by 1818, Mogg's New Picture of London (Edward Mogg) in 1848. A View of London, or, The stranger's guide through the British metropolis had appeared by 1804.

Other works by Feltham included:

- The English Enchiridion, a selection of apothegms, moral maxims, &c. (1799)
- A Popular View of the Structure and Economy of the Human Body (1803)
- Guide to all the Watering and Sea-bathing Places (1803, later edition 1813)
