= Russell Scott (minister) =

Russell Scott (1760–1834) was an English nonconformist minister, prominent in the 1790s as a supporter of the Political Martyrs group of radicals, and in later life as a leading Unitarian.

== Early life ==
The younger brother of Mary Scott, he was the son of the linen merchant John Scott of Milborne Port. He was educated at Daventry Academy and the Independent College, Homerton, and trained as a minister at Hoxton Academy. He then sought medical training, as useful for a minister in a place where medical help was hard to find. He studied medicine under William Hawes. In all, this student period was a decade, to 1785.

During his period in London, Scott met Theophilus Lindsey, who already knew his sister Mary. A 1782 letter from Lindsey, to his friend William Tayleur, mentions Scott as attending the Essex Street Chapel, and having moved from the orthodox Homerton to the liberal Hoxton in line with a change of views. He described the Scott family background as strict Calvinist. Lindsey at this point thought of him as a "good Unitarian".

Scott began as a dissenting minister informally at Milborne Port. He was at Wrington, also in Somerset, from 1783 to 1788, being ordained there in 1787.

The High Street Chapel in Portsmouth was associated with Sir John Carter and his son John Bonham-Carter MP. Scott was pastor there from 1788. By 1819 the congregation, some years after the Doctrine of the Trinity Act 1813 legalised Unitarian views, was self-described as Unitarian.

== Associate of radicals ==
In the period leading up to the Habeas Corpus Suspension Act 1794, Scott became associated with four of the five radical reformers often known as the "Scottish Martyrs" (a misnomer since three were English), who were sentenced to transportation to Australia. Their trials were high-profile confrontations of reformers with the authorities.

For three of them, it was a result of their involvement in the Edinburgh conventions held in 1792, and in 1793 after the start of the French Revolutionary Wars, run by the London Corresponding Society. Thomas Fyshe Palmer was a Unitarian minister in Dundee who saw a pamphlet by George Mealmaker through the press.

Theophilus Lindsey was concerned about the repression, particularly as it also affected Joseph Priestley, victim of the Priestley Riots of 1791, and younger Unitarians such as Jeremiah Joyce, and his numerous letters for 1794 document related events. Russell V. Holt, Principal of the Unitarian College, Manchester wrote of the period, its mobs and treason trials:

These outrages on justice and on liberty made a lasting impression on many minds which bore fruit later in life-long devotion to the cause of freedom. Such was the effect on the mind of the Rev. Russell Scott.

In early February 1794 Thomas Muir was a convict on the transport ship Surprize lying off Portsmouth, where he was joined by Palmer from the prison hulk Stanislaus moored on the River Thames off Woolwich. The pair had been in Newgate Gaol, London, where the Unitarian group of Lindsey, Priestley and William Russell had tried to visit them, but had been too late. Lindsey asked Scott to visit them on the Surprize, which he did, bringing money and books. In March, when Maurice Margarot and William Skirving were also on the Surprize with Muir and Palmer, Scott visited again.

Scott similarly supported Joseph Gerrald in 1795, the fifth "Martyr", who was transported on the Sovereign.

== Later life ==
Scott contributed in 1795 to a major hymn book for rational dissenters, A Collection of Hymns and Psalms for Private and Public Worship, edited by Andrew Kippis and others, which went through many editions in the early 19th century. William Haslam Mills called his later standing among Unitarians as "a sort of bishop of his denomination".

Politically, Portsmouth was a "close borough", one with a narrowly restricted electorate. Under the Carter family, it was "the independent party in the corporation, most of them religious dissenters" who decided the Members of Parliament. A historian of Portsmouth wrote: "Portsmouth was a close borough but not a corrupt one; the Carter party were determined to keep control of it by the methods common to the day [...]". Scott himself became a burgess in 1817, so joining the controlling body. This election was ahead of the Sacramental Test Act 1828 that removed the "political disabilities" of dissenters; but in Portsmouth those were circumvented, even treated with disdain.

In 1822 Scott published a book, An Analytical Investigation of the Scriptural Claims of the Devil, based on a lecture series he had given in 1820–1 in Portsmouth. When William Johnson Fox moved to South Place Chapel in 1824, Scott gave the inaugural service.

== Family ==
Scott married in 1790 Sophia Hawes (1761–1828), eldest daughter of William Hawes. There were three children of the marriage, the first dying young. Their only daughter Sophia Russell Scott married John Edward Taylor in 1824, and died in 1832 aged 38; they had four children. Taylor was the son of Mary Taylor née Scott, Russell's sister, and this was a first cousin marriage.

John Edward Taylor, Scott's son Russell Scott II (1801–1880) and several of Scott's grandsons including C. P. Scott were the founding group of the Manchester Guardian, now the London Guardian newspaper. They dominated its history from 1821 until 1929, when C. P. Scott retired as editor.
