= James Ford (translator) =

English cleric and translator

James Ford (1797–1877) was an English cleric, known as a translator of Dante.

== Life ==
He was the son of Sir Richard Ford, police magistrate in London and Member of Parliament, and his wife Marianne Booth, an artist and daughter of Benjamin Booth; Richard Ford (1796–1858) was his elder brother. He was educated at Rugby School, and matriculated at Oriel College, Oxford in 1814, graduating B.A. in 1818, and M.A. in 1821.

James was a prebendary of Exeter Cathedral from 1849 to 1877.

== Works ==
Ford as a poet published:

- Thoughts in Verse on Private Prayer and The Publick Worship (1867)
- More Thoughts in Verse (1877)

The Inferno, the first part of Ford's Dante translation, appeared in 1865. The completed English verse translation was published in 1870.

== Family ==
In 1825, when Ford had a living in Northampton, he married Jane Frances Nagle, daughter of Edward Nagle. Their daughter Anne Frances (c.1826–1910) married Thomas Hughes in 1847. In 1848 her sister Marianne married the banker Edward Andrew Sanders. The eldest son James Edward entered Rugby School in 1849 aged 13; his younger brother Edmund Salwey entered the school at the same age, in 1852.
