= John Badcock (writer) =

English sporting writer

- Died: Unknown
- Occupation: Writer

John Badcock (fl. 1816–1830) was an English sporting writer, still not identified, who published between 1816 and 1830, under the pseudonyms of Jon Bee and John Hinds. He wrote works on boxing and horse racing. Internal evidence suggests only a connection with Devon or Cornwall.

== Works ==
When he issued in 1823 his Slang, a Dictionary of the Turf, the Ring, the Chase, he described himself as editor of the 'Fancy,' 'Fancy Gazette,' and the 'Living Picture of London.' 'The Fancy, or True Sportsman's Guide; authentic Memoirs of Pugilists,' came out in monthly parts, beginning April 1821, and was sold in two volumes in 1826. The 'Fancy Gazette' was a part of 'The Annals of Sporting and Fancy Gazette,' thirteen volumes of which were published between 1822 and 1828. The 'Living Picture of London' was compiled by Badcock as a guide to its condition in the year 1818, and a similar volume was produced by him in 1828. From a note in the 'Fancy,' i. 330, it appears that the volume entitled 'Letters from London; Observations of a Russian during a residence in England of ten months,' which purported to be a translation from the original manuscript of 'Oloff Napea, ex-officer of cavalry' (1816), was the production of Badcock.

His last work under the signature of Jon Bee was an edition of the Works of Samuel Foote, with remarks on each play, and an essay on the life, genius, and writings of the author' (1830), 3 vols.; and from some passages in the essay it would seem that Badcock was connected with Devon or Cornwall, where the name is common. This supposition is corroborated by the fact that in The Gentleman's Magazine,' 1819, pt. i. 618–20, pt. ii. 326, there appeared two letters from him announcing his intention of printing the lives of the celebrated natives of Devon since the time of Prince. The volumes which bear the name of 'John Hinds' relate to the stable. The earliest, 'The Veterinary Surgeon, or Farriery taught on a new and easy plan,' was issued in 1827 and 1829, and reissued at Philadelphia in 1848. It was followed by 'Conversations on Conditioning: the Groom's Oracle,' 1829 and 1830. 'Mr. Hinds' was also credited with editing new editions of William Osmer's Treatise on the Horse, and Charles Thompson's Rules for Bad Horsemen, both of which appeared in 1830. This was the last year in which any work that can be attributed to Badcock was published.
