= Lambeth (constituency) =

Parliamentary constituency in the United Kingdom, 1832–1885

- Former borough constituency for the House of Commons
- County: Greater London

1832–1885
- Seats: Two
- Created from: Surrey
- Replaced by: Brixton, Camberwell North, Dulwich, Kennington, Lambeth North, Newington West, Norwood and Peckham, Newington Walworth

Lambeth was a constituency 1832–1885 loosely equivalent in area to the later administrative units: the London Borough of Lambeth and the south-west and centre of the London Borough of Southwark. It returned two members of parliament (MPs) to the House of Commons of the UK Parliament by the bloc vote version of the first-past-the-post system.

== History ==
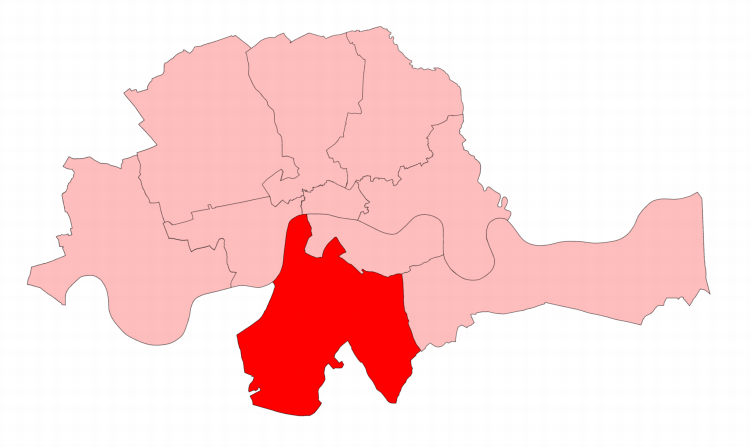
Lambeth in the Metropolitan area, showing boundaries used from 1868 to 1885.

The constituency was among many created under the Great Reform Act (for the 1832 general election) and abolished by the Redistribution of Seats Act 1885 for the 1885 general election when it was divided into eight single-member seats: Camberwell North, Camberwell Peckham, Lambeth Brixton, Lambeth Kennington, Lambeth North, Lambeth Norwood, Newington Walworth and Newington West.

== Boundaries ==
Under original proposals it would have been greater, taking all of Dulwich and Brixton and possibly two parishes to the east. The commissioners appointed to fix parliamentary boundaries attempted to equalise the seven new "metropolitan" constituencies of London in number of voters and in population. For this reason Bermondsey and Rotherhithe were assigned to Southwark. It was also decided not to include the entirety of the parishes of Camberwell and Lambeth: both were very large parishes running five or six miles south from the Thames. The portions closest to the river were heavily built up, but the southern sections were mainly rural. Dulwich and part of Brixton were therefore excluded, instead forming part of East Surrey.

The boundaries were detailed in the schedules of the Parliamentary Boundaries Act 1832, and consisted of:

- The entire parish of St Mary Newington
- The parish of St Giles Camberwell (except for the Manor and Hamlet of Dulwich)
- The part of the parish of Lambeth north of a line defined in the act.

The area was unchanged when parliamentary seats were next redistributed under the Reform Act 1867.

== Members of Parliament ==
| Election | 1st member | 1st party | 2nd member | 2nd party |
|---|---|---|---|---|
| 1832 | Charles Tennyson-d'Eyncourt | Whig | Benjamin Hawes | Whig |
| 1847 | Charles Tennyson-d'Eyncourt | Whig | Charles Pearson | Radical |
| 1850 by-election | Charles Tennyson-d'Eyncourt | Whig | William Williams | Radical |
| 1852 | William Arthur Wilkinson | Radical | William Williams | Radical |
| 1857 | William Roupell | Radical | William Williams | Radical |
| 1859 | William Roupell | Liberal | William Williams | Liberal |
| 1862 by-election | Frederick Doulton | Liberal | William Williams | Liberal |
| 1865 by-election | Frederick Doulton | Liberal | James Lawrence | Liberal |
| 1865 | Frederick Doulton | Liberal | Thomas Hughes | Liberal |
| 1868 | Sir James Lawrence | Liberal | Sir William McArthur | Liberal |
| 1885 | constituency abolished: see Brixton, Camberwell North, Dulwich, Kennington, Lambeth North, Newington West, Norwood and Peckham, Newington Walworth | | | |

== Election results ==
=== Elections in the 1830s ===
General election 1832: Lambeth (2 seats)
| Party | Candidate | Votes | % | ±% |
|---|---|---|---|---|
| Whig | Charles Tennyson | 2,716 | 46.4 | |
| Whig | Benjamin Hawes | 2,166 | 37.0 | |
| Radical | Daniel Wakefield | 819 | 14.0 | |
| Radical | John Moore | 155 | 2.6 | |
| Majority | | 1,347 | 23.0 | |
| Turnout | | 3,220 | 67.5 | |
| Registered electors | | 4,768 | | |
| Whig win (new seat) | | | | |
| Whig win (new seat) | | | | |

General election 1835: Lambeth (2 seats)
| Party | Candidate | Votes | % | ±% |
|---|---|---|---|---|
| Whig | Benjamin Hawes | 2,008 | 40.7 | +3.7 |
| Whig | Charles Tennyson | 1,995 | 40.4 | −6.0 |
| Conservative | Charles Farebrother | 931 | 18.9 | New |
| Majority | | 1,064 | 21.6 | −1.4 |
| Turnout | | 2,890 | 65.2 | −2.3 |
| Registered electors | | 4,435 | | |
| Whig hold | | Swing | | |
| Whig hold | | Swing | | |

General election 1837: Lambeth (2 seats)
| Party | Candidate | Votes | % | ±% |
|---|---|---|---|---|
| Whig | Benjamin Hawes | 2,934 | 39.8 | −0.9 |
| Whig | Charles Tennyson-d'Eyncourt | 2,811 | 38.1 | −2.3 |
| Conservative | Charles Baldwin | 1,624 | 22.0 | +3.1 |
| Majority | | 1,187 | 16.1 | −5.5 |
| Turnout | | 4,497 | 63.9 | −1.3 |
| Registered electors | | 7,040 | | |
| Whig hold | | Swing | −1.2 | |
| Whig hold | | Swing | −1.9 | |

=== Elections in the 1840s ===
General election 1841: Lambeth (2 seats)
| Party | Candidate | Votes | % | ±% |
|---|---|---|---|---|
| Whig | Benjamin Hawes | 2,601 | 29.1 | −10.7 |
| Whig | Charles Tennyson-d'Eyncourt | 2,568 | 28.8 | −9.3 |
| Conservative | Charles Baldwin | 1,999 | 22.4 | +11.4 |
| Conservative | Thomas Cabbell | 1,763 | 19.7 | +8.7 |
| Majority | | 569 | 6.4 | −9.7 |
| Turnout | | 4,466 (est.) | 57.8 (est.) | −6.1 |
| Registered electors | | 7,731 | | |
| Whig hold | | Swing | −10.4 | |
| Whig hold | | Swing | −9.7 | |

General election 1847: Lambeth (2 seats)
| Party | Candidate | Votes | % | ±% |
|---|---|---|---|---|
| Radical | Charles Pearson | 4,614 | 39.6 | N/A |
| Whig | Charles Tennyson-d'Eyncourt | 3,708 | 31.8 | +3.0 |
| Whig | Benjamin Hawes | 3,344 | 28.7 | −0.4 |
| Turnout | | 5,833 (est.) | 42.0 (est.) | −15.8 |
| Registered electors | | 13,885 | | |
| Majority | | 906 | 7.8 | N/A |
| Radical gain from Whig | | Swing | | |
| Whig hold | | Swing | | |

=== Elections in the 1850s ===
Pearson resigned, causing a by-election.

By-election, 7 August 1850: Lambeth
| Party | Candidate | Votes | % | ±% |
|---|---|---|---|---|
| Radical | William Williams | 3,834 | 68.5 | N/A |
| Radical | Charles Napier | 1,182 | 21.1 | N/A |
| Radical | John Hinde Palmer | 585 | 10.4 | N/A |
| Majority | | 2,652 | 47.4 | +39.4 |
| Turnout | | 5,601 | 34.4 | −7.6 |
| Registered electors | | 16,284 | | |
| Radical hold | | Swing | N/A | |

General election 1852: Lambeth (2 seats)
| Party | Candidate | Votes | % | ±% |
|---|---|---|---|---|
| Radical | William Arthur Wilkinson | 4,752 | 37.7 | +18.9 |
| Radical | William Williams | 4,022 | 31.9 | +12.1 |
| Whig | Charles Tennyson-d'Eyncourt | 3,829 | 30.4 | −30.1 |
| Majority | | 193 | 1.5 | N/A |
| Turnout | | 8,216 (est.) | 45.3 (est.) | +3.3 |
| Registered electors | | 18,131 | | |
| Radical hold | | Swing | +17.0 | |
| Radical gain from Whig | | Swing | +13.6 | |

General election 1857: Lambeth (2 seats)
| Party | Candidate | Votes | % | ±% |
|---|---|---|---|---|
| Radical | William Roupell | 9,318 | 46.1 | N/A |
| Radical | William Williams | 7,648 | 37.9 | +6.0 |
| Radical | William Arthur Wilkinson | 3,234 | 16.1 | −21.6 |
| Majority | | 4,414 | 21.8 | +20.3 |
| Turnout | | 10,100 (est.) | 49.8 (est.) | +4.5 |
| Registered electors | | 20,276 | | |
| Radical hold | | Swing | N/A | |
| Radical hold | | Swing | N/A | |

General election 1859: Lambeth (2 seats)
| Party | Candidate | Votes | % | ±% |
|---|---|---|---|---|
| Liberal | William Roupell | Unopposed | | |
| Liberal | William Williams | Unopposed | | |
| Registered electors | | 21,737 | | |
| Liberal hold | | | | |
| Liberal hold | | | | |

=== Elections in the 1860s ===
Roupell resigned, causing a by-election.

By-election, 5 May 1862: Lambeth
| Party | Candidate | Votes | % | ±% |
|---|---|---|---|---|
| Liberal | Frederick Doulton | 5,124 | 82.3 | N/A |
| Liberal | William Sleigh | 754 | 12.1 | New |
| Liberal | William Arthur Wilkinson | 347 | 5.6 | N/A |
| Majority | | 4,370 | 70.2 | N/A |
| Turnout | | 6,225 | 26.4 | N/A |
| Registered electors | | 23,542 | | |
| Liberal hold | | Swing | N/A | |

Williams' death caused a by-election.

By-election, 9 May 1865: Lambeth
| Party | Candidate | Votes | % | ±% |
|---|---|---|---|---|
| Liberal | James Lawrence | Unopposed | | |
| Liberal hold | | | | |

General election 1865: Lambeth (2 seats)
| Party | Candidate | Votes | % | ±% |
|---|---|---|---|---|
| Liberal | Thomas Hughes | 6,373 | 35.6 | N/A |
| Liberal | Frederick Doulton | 6,280 | 35.1 | N/A |
| Liberal | James Lawrence | 4,743 | 26.5 | N/A |
| Conservative | James Haig | 514 | 2.9 | N/A |
| Majority | | 1,537 | 8.6 | N/A |
| Turnout | | 11,584 (est.) | 41.7 (est.) | N/A |
| Registered electors | | 27,754 | | |
| Liberal hold | | Swing | N/A | |
| Liberal hold | | Swing | N/A | |

General election 1868: Lambeth (2 seats)
| Party | Candidate | Votes | % | ±% |
|---|---|---|---|---|
| Liberal | James Lawrence | 15,051 | 41.1 | +14.6 |
| Liberal | William McArthur | 14,553 | 39.7 | N/A |
| Conservative | John Morgan Howard | 7,043 | 19.2 | +16.3 |
| Majority | | 7,510 | 20.5 | +11.9 |
| Turnout | | 21,845 (est.) | 65.4 (est.) | +23.7 |
| Registered electors | | 33,377 | | |
| Liberal hold | | Swing | +3.2 | |
| Liberal hold | | Swing | | |

=== Election in the 1870s ===
General election 1874: Lambeth (2 seats)
| Party | Candidate | Votes | % | ±% |
|---|---|---|---|---|
| Liberal | James Lawrence | 12,175 | 34.6 | −6.5 |
| Liberal | William McArthur | 11,788 | 33.5 | −6.2 |
| Conservative | John Morgan Howard | 11,201 | 31.9 | +12.7 |
| Majority | | 587 | 1.6 | −18.9 |
| Turnout | | 23,183 (est.) | 57.8 (est.) | −7.6 |
| Registered electors | | 40,103 | | |
| Liberal hold | | Swing | −6.4 | |
| Liberal hold | | Swing | −6.3 | |

=== Election in the 1880s ===
General election 1880: Lambeth (2 seats)
| Party | Candidate | Votes | % | ±% |
|---|---|---|---|---|
| Liberal | James Lawrence | 19,315 | 35.1 | +0.5 |
| Liberal | William McArthur | 18,983 | 34.5 | +1.0 |
| Conservative | John Morgan Howard | 16,701 | 30.4 | −1.5 |
| Majority | | 2,282 | 4.1 | +2.5 |
| Turnout | | 36,016 (est.) | 71.3 (est.) | +13.5 |
| Registered electors | | 50,541 | | |
| Liberal hold | | Swing | +0.6 | |
| Liberal hold | | Swing | +0.9 | |

== Bibliography ==
- Leigh Rayment's Historical List of MPs – Constituencies beginning with "L" (part 1)
- Harris, J. (2001). The Roupells of Lambeth. London: The Streatham Society. ISBN 1-873520-37-9.
- Hill, George (1879). The Electoral History of the Borough of Lambeth since its Enfranchisement in 1832. London: Stanford.
