= List of stewards of the Manor of Old Shoreham =

This is a list of United Kingdom Members of Parliament appointed as Steward of the Manor of Old Shoreham, a notional 'office of profit under the crown' which was formerly used to resign from the House of Commons. The last steward died in 1832.

Date	Member	Constituency	Party	Reason for resignation
December 1756	Thomas Ryder	Tiverton		
4 July 1757	James Hayes	Downton		
March 1760	George Gray	Winchelsea		
20 February 1762	John Hamilton	Wigtownshire		
13 March 1756	Keith Stewart	Wigtown Burghs		
27 April 1762	William Fitzherbert	Bramber		
10 February 1763	Augustus John Hervey	Bury St Edmunds		Appointment as commander-in-chief in the Mediterranean
March 1763	Browse Trist	Totnes		
12 November 1763	Thomas Morgan	Brecon borough		To contest Monmouthshire
30 May 1765	Philip Stanhope	St Germans		Sold his seat to the government
11 July 1799	William Grant	Banffshire		On appointment as Solicitor General for England and Wales

== See also ==
- List of stewards of the Chiltern Hundreds
- List of stewards of the Manor of East Hendred
- List of stewards of the Manor of Hempholme
- List of stewards of the Manor of Northstead
- List of stewards of the Manor of Poynings
