= List of stewards of the Manor of Poynings =

This is a list of the Members of Parliament appointed as Steward of the Manor of Poynings, a notional 'office of profit under the crown' which is used to resign from the House of Commons. The Manor of Poynings reverted to the Crown in 1804, but was leased until 1835. The last steward died in 1854.

Date	Member	Constituency	Party	Reason for resignation
8 September 1841	Sir George Anson	Lichfield	Whig	
13 March 1843	Sir Alexander Cray Grant, Bt.	Cambridge	Con	

== See also ==
- List of Stewards of the Chiltern Hundreds
- List of Stewards of the Manor of East Hendred
- List of Stewards of the Manor of Hempholme
- List of Stewards of the Manor of Northstead
- List of Stewards of the Manor of Old Shoreham
