= List of stewards of the Manor of East Hendred =

This is a list of the Members of Parliament appointed as Steward of the Manor of East Hendred, a notional 'office of profit under the crown' which was used to resign from the House of Commons. Appointment of an MP to the office was first made in 1763. The Manor of East Hendred was sold by the Crown in 1823, but through oversight, appointments to the post of Steward continued until 1840, after which it was discontinued for parliamentary purposes in favour of other stewardships. The last steward died in 1851.

== Stewards ==
Dates given are of the writ to replace the member who accepted the stewardship.

Date	Member	Constituency	Party	Reason for resignation
21 November 1763	Edward Southwell	Bridgwater		To contest Gloucestershire
16 January 1765	William Hamilton	Midhurst		Made Ambassador to the Two Sicilies
30 May 1765	Joseph Gulston	Poole		Ill-health
23 December 1765	Verney Lovett	Wendover		To allow Viscount Fermanagh to bring Edmund Burke into Parliament
15 May 1769	Charles Morgan	Brecon		To contest Breconshire
20 May 1769	Alexander Wedderburn	Richmond (Yorks)		To express support for John Wilkes
16 January 1770	William Clive	Bishop's Castle		To return Wedderburn (above) to Parliament
31 January 1770	Thomas Anson	Lichfield		To bring George Adams into Parliament
18 April 1770	James Grenville	Horsham		Pressure from his brothers over his support for William Pitt
25 May 1770	Thomas Hutchings-Medlycott	Milborne Port		To bring the Earl of Catherlough into Parliament
30 January 1771	Lord Robert Spencer	Woodstock		To contest Oxford
15 May 1771	Hon. Edward Bouverie	Salisbury		To bring Viscount Folkestone into Parliament
31 January 1772	John Morgan	Brecon		To contest Monmouthshire
4 February 1772	Lord Archibald Hamilton	Lancashire		
18 May 1772	Andrew Wilkinson	Aldborough		To bring Earl of Lincoln into Parliament
7 December 1772	Henry Herbert	Wilton		To contest Wiltshire
28 December 1772	William Lemon	Penryn		To contest Cornwall
16 April 1773	Nathaniel Lister	Clitheroe		To bring Thomas Lister into Parliament
31 May 1774	Edward Foley	Droitwich		To contest Worcestershire
31 December 1774	Henry Fownes-Luttrell	Minehead		To allow the North Ministry to bring Thomas Pownall into Parliament
14 March 1775	Joseph Bullock	Wendover		
20 April 1775	Middleton Onslow	Rye		To bring Thomas Onslow into Parliament
24 April 1775	Harcourt Powell	Newtown		Sold his electoral interest to Sir Richard Worsley
31 May 1775	Fletcher Norton	Carlisle		Sir James Lowther, on whose interest he was elected, went into opposition against the North Ministry
9 November 1776	John Rolle Walter	Exeter		To contest Devon
20 February 1777	Gilbert Elliot	Morpeth		To contest Roxburghshire
29 May 1777	Sir George Suttie	Haddingtonshire		To bring William Hamilton Nisbet into Parliament, by prearrangement
24 February 1778	William Hanger	East Retford		To bring Lord John Pelham-Clinton into Parliament
11 January 1779	Thomas Lyon	Aberdeen Burghs		
20 March 1779	Nathaniel Bayly	Westbury		To attend to his business affairs in Jamaica
29 April 1779	Arthur Duff	Elginshire		To bring Lord William Gordon into Parliament
12 June 1780	Thomas Johnes	Cardigan		To contest Radnorshire
30 November 1780	Warren Lisle	Weymouth and Melcombe Regis		
7 December 1780	Savile Finch	Malton		
14 February 1781	The Lord Macartney	Bere Alston		Appointed Governor of Madras
30 April 1781	William Chaffin Grove	Cardigan		
8 June 1781	Edward Onslow	Aldborough		Left England after making homosexual advances at a Royal Academy exhibition
30 June 1781	Philip Yorke	Helston		
20 April 1782	John Parker	Clitheroe		
15 July 1783	James Whitshed	Cirencester		
23 November 1783	Sir Robert Clayton	Bletchingley		
1 January 1784	Sir George Savile	Yorkshire		
6 January 1784	John Pollexfen Bastard	Truro		
20 January 1784	Charles Mellish	Aldborough		Disagreement with the Duke of Newcastle
31 August 1784	James Hunter Blair	Edinburgh		
22 April 1785	Andrew Bayntun	Weobley		
3 February 1786	Chaloner Arcedeckne	Westbury		
13 February 1786	John Grant	Fowey		
1 April 1786	John Rogers	Helston		
16 August 1786	Peter Johnston	Kirkcudbright Stewartry		
29 January 1787	Sir Edward Dering	New Romney		
4 June 1787	Edward Leeds	Reigate		
23 December 1788	Charles Rainsford	Bere Alston		
4 September 1789	Charles Edwin	Glamorganshire		
4 January 1791	Thomas Clarke Jervoise	Yarmouth (Isle of Wight)		
6 May 1791	William Morton Pitt	Dorset		
18 May 1791	Richard Ford	Appleby		
26 August 1791	Sir Richard Worsley	Newtown		
7 January 1793	Philip Yorke	Grantham		
13 February 1793	The Viscount Melbourne	Newport (Isle of Wight)		To bring his son Peniston Lamb into Parliament
6 March 1793	Brook Watson	City of London		
3 February 1794	John Curtis	Steyning		
15 February 1794	Augustus Rogers	Queenborough		
17 February 1794	Sir Frederick Fletcher-Vane	Winchelsea		
9 June 1794	John Walker-Heneage	Cricklade		
12 July 1794	William Windham	Norwich		
14 January 1795	Thomas Gilbert	Lichfield		
21 February 1795	Viscount Garlies	Saltash		
10 November 1795	Thomas Calvert	St Mawes		
22 November 1796	John Buller	West Looe		
13 December 1796	Richard Barwell	Winchelsea		
14 June 1797	John Hunter	Leominster		
29 July 1797	Sir George Thomas	Arundel		
1 March 1799	Lord Robert Spencer	Wareham		
28 July 1799	Sir John Mitford	Bere Alston		
30 October 1799	Mark Singleton	Eye		
29 April 1800	John Petrie	Gatton		
22 May 1800	Alexander Hope	Dumfries Burghs		
10 March 1801	Sir William Grant	Banffshire		
6 July 1801	William Adams	Plympton Erle		
14 December 1802	Samuel Haynes	Brackley		
12 January 1803	John Hiley Addington	Bossiney		
24 January 1803	James Dashwood	Gatton		
25 February 1803	James Patrick Murray	Yarmouth (Isle of Wight)		
18 July 1803	Ayscoghe Boucherett	Great Grimsby		
22 August 1803	Charles Philip Yorke	Cambridgeshire		
22 April 1805	Philip Dundas	Gatton		
22 July 1805	James Graham	Cockermouth	Tory	
24 February 1806	The Viscount FitzWilliam	Wilton		
6 March 1806	Philip Langmead	Plymouth		
21 March 1806	George Peter Moore	Queenborough		
20 January 1806	Sir Home Popham	Yarmouth (Isle of Wight)		
24 February 1806	George Dundas	Richmond (Yorks)		
1 August 1806	Viscount Proby	Buckingham		
14 January 1807	Sir John Lethbridge	Minehead	Tory	
30 July 1807	Viscount Howick	Appleby	Whig	
30 January 1808	Godfrey Wentworth Wentworth	Tregony	Whig	
8 February 1808	Evan Foulkes	Tralee		
22 April 1808	Scrope Bernard	St Mawes	Tory	
27 July 1808	Patrick Crawford Bruce	Dundalk		
4 February 1809	Charles Harward Butler	Kilkenny City	Whig	
30 January 1810	Sir George Bowyer	Malmesbury	Whig	
13 July 1810	Henry Glassford	Dunbartonshire		
21 January 1812	Lawrence Dundas	Richmond	Whig	
13 April 1812	William Dundas	Elgin Burghs		
30 June 1812	Richard Hart Davis	Colchester	Tory	
22 December 1812	Magens Dorrien-Magens	Ludgershall	Tory	
13 February 1813	Richard Nevill	Wexford		
23 March 1813	Lord Henry FitzGerald	Kildare		
10 November 1813	William Thornton	Woodstock		
5 December 1814	Charles Trelawny-Brereton	Mitchell		
21 July 1815	William Vane Powlett	Winchelsea		
1 March 1816	Arthur Shakespeare	Portarlington		
11 March 1816	Charles Buller	West Looe	Tory	
2 April 1816	Sir Thomas Winnington	Droitwich	Whig	
10 May 1816	Thomas Philipps Lamb	Rye		
29 November 1820	Jonathan Elford	Westbury		
11 February 1823	Sir Herbert Taylor	Windsor	Tory	
24 February 1823	John Poo Beresford	Coleraine	Tory	
11 March 1824	Ranald George Macdonald	Plympton Erle		
6 April 1824	James Drummond	Perthshire		
16 February 1826	William Morton Pitt	Dorset		
19 December 1826	Henry Monteith	Saltash		
6 April 1827	John Buller	West Looe	Whig	
20 April 1827	Augustus Frederick Ellis	Seaford	Tory	
2 March 1829	Sir Robert Inglis	Ripon	Tory	
6 March 1829	William Edward Tomline	Truro	Tory	
10 April 1830	William Ashley-Cooper	Dorchester		
25 February 1831	Charles Arbuthnot	Ashburton	Tory	
4 April 1831	Henry Dundas	Winchelsea	Tory	
15 July 1831	Mathew Pennefather	Cashel	Tory	
6 October 1831	William Ponsonby	Poole		
25 February 1832	Charles George James Arbuthnot	Tregony	Tory	
3 March 1834	Thomas Francis Kennedy	Ayr Burghs	Whig	
8 February 1837	Edward George Granville Howard	Morpeth	Lib	
24 January 1840	Sir Edward Codrington	Devonport	Lib	

== See also ==
- List of Stewards of the Chiltern Hundreds
- List of Stewards of the Manor of Hempholme
- List of Stewards of the Manor of Northstead
- List of Stewards of the Manor of Old Shoreham
- List of Stewards of the Manor of Poynings
