= Irish House of Commons =

Lower house of the Parliament of Ireland that existed from 1297 until 1800

Type
- Type: Lower house

History
- Established: 1297
- Disbanded: 1 January 1801
- Succeeded by: House of Commons of the United Kingdom

Leadership
- Speaker of the House: John Foster (1785–1800)
- Seats: 300 (Note: In 1800.)

Elections
- Voting system: Plurality block voting with limited suffrage

Meeting place
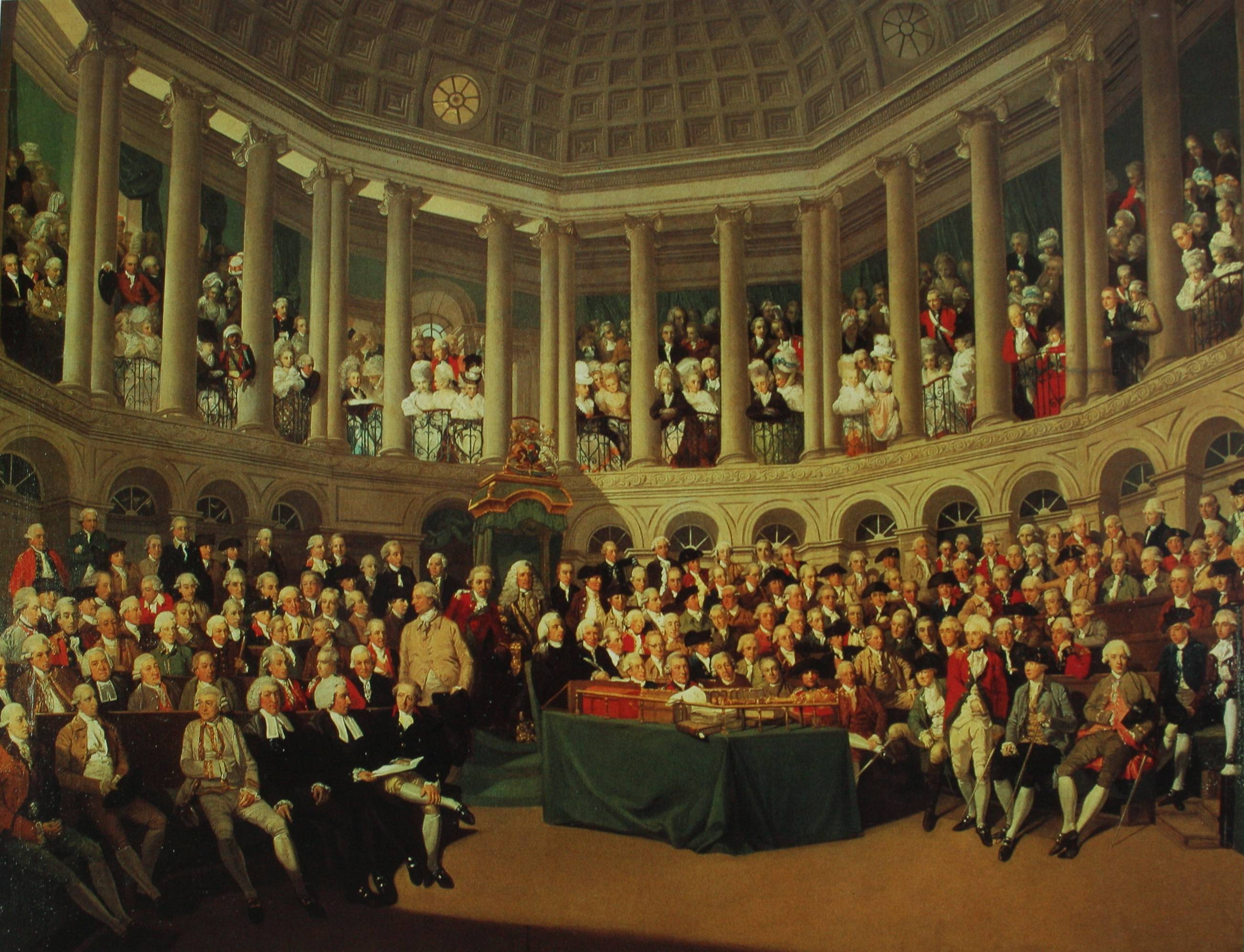
- The Irish House of Commons (by Francis Wheatley, 1780)

The Irish House of Commons (Irish: Teach na gComóntach, Teach na dTeachtaí) was the lower house of the Parliament of Ireland that existed from 1297 until the end of 1800. The upper house was the House of Lords. The membership of the House of Commons was directly elected, but on a highly restrictive franchise, similar to the unreformed House of Commons in contemporary Great Britain. Catholics were disqualified from sitting in the Irish parliament from 1691, even though they comprised the vast majority of the Irish population.

The Irish executive, known as the Dublin Castle administration, under the Lord Lieutenant of Ireland, was not answerable to the House of Commons but to the British government. However, the Chief Secretary for Ireland was usually a member of the Irish parliament. In the Commons, business was presided over by the Speaker.

From 1 January 1801, it ceased to exist and was succeeded by the House of Commons of the United Kingdom.

== Franchise ==
The limited franchise was exclusively male; from 1728 until 1793, Catholics were disfranchised, as well as being ineligible to sit in the Commons. Most of the population of all religions had no vote. In counties, forty-shilling freeholders were enfranchised while in most boroughs it was either only the members of self-electing corporations or a highly restricted body of freemen that were eligible to vote for the borough's representatives. The vast majority of parliamentary boroughs were pocket boroughs, the private property of an aristocratic patron.

== Abolition ==
The House of Commons was abolished under the Acts of Union 1800, which merged the Kingdom of Ireland into the Kingdom of Great Britain to form the United Kingdom of Great Britain and Ireland with effect from 1 January 1801. The Irish House of Commons sat for the last time in Parliament House, Dublin on 2 August 1800. One hundred of its members were designated or co-opted to sit with the House of Commons of Great Britain, forming the House of Commons of the United Kingdom. The patron of pocket boroughs that were disfranchised under the Act of Union was awarded £15,000 compensation for each.

== Speaker of the Commons ==
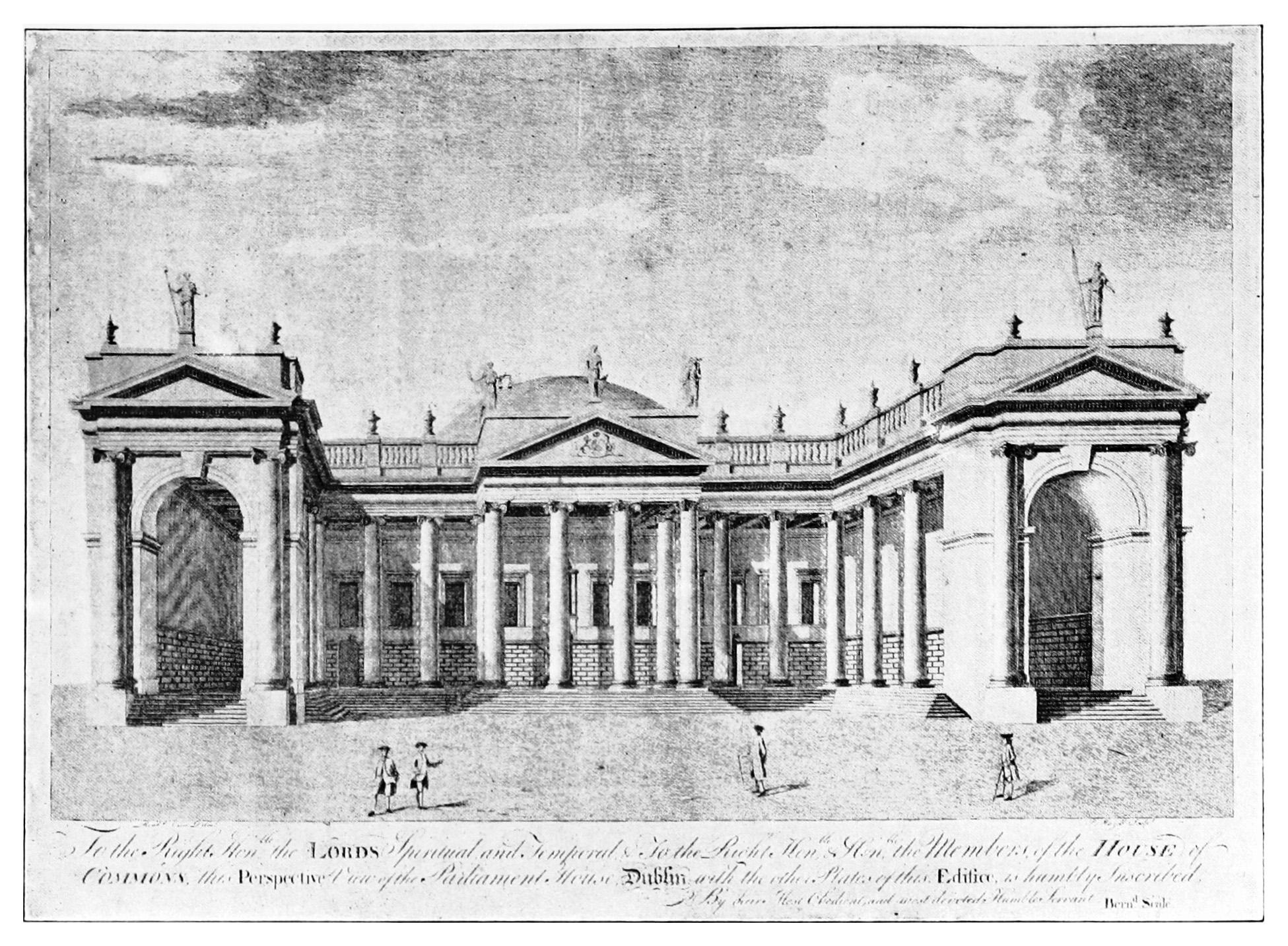
Drawing of the front of the Irish Parliament House with the dome, seen from the street-level, in the 18th century

The Speaker of the Irish House of Commons was the presiding officer of the House and its most senior official. The position was one of considerable power and prestige, and in the absence of a government chosen from and answerable to the Commons, he was the dominant political figure in the Parliament. The last Speaker was John Foster.

== Constituencies ==
Engraving of section of the Irish House of Commons chamber by Peter Mazell based on the drawing by Rowland Omer 1767

The number of boroughs invited to return members had originally been small (only 55 Boroughs existed in 1603) but was doubled by the Stuart monarchs. By the time of the Union, there were 150 constituencies, each electing two members by plurality block voting; an elector could vote for one or two of the candidates, with the two receiving the most votes being returned. The constituencies had different franchises as follows:

- 32 county constituencies;
- 8 county borough constituencies;
- 109 borough constituencies, of varying franchises:
- 1 university constituency (Dublin University).

Following the Act of Union, from 1801, there were 100 MPs from Ireland in the House of Commons of the United Kingdom. The Irish constituencies at Westminster were a subset of those in the Irish House of Commons as follows:

- the 32 counties and two most populous county borough constituencies, Cork City and Dublin City, retained two MPs each;
- the 6 other county boroughs, the university, and the 25 most populous boroughs were reduced to one MP each;
- the 84 least populous Irish parliamentary boroughs were disfranchised after the Union.

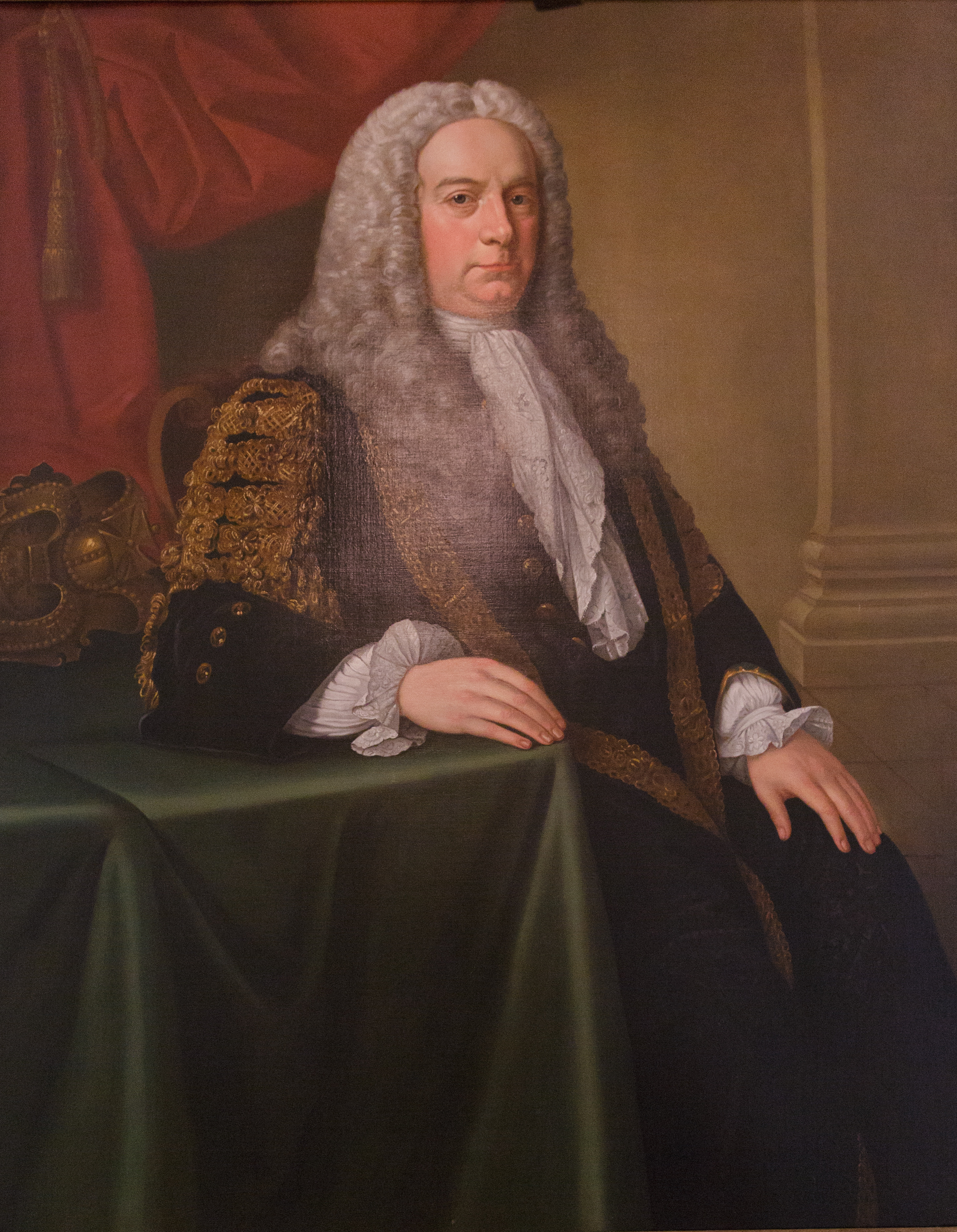
Henry Boyle, speaker between 1733 and 1756

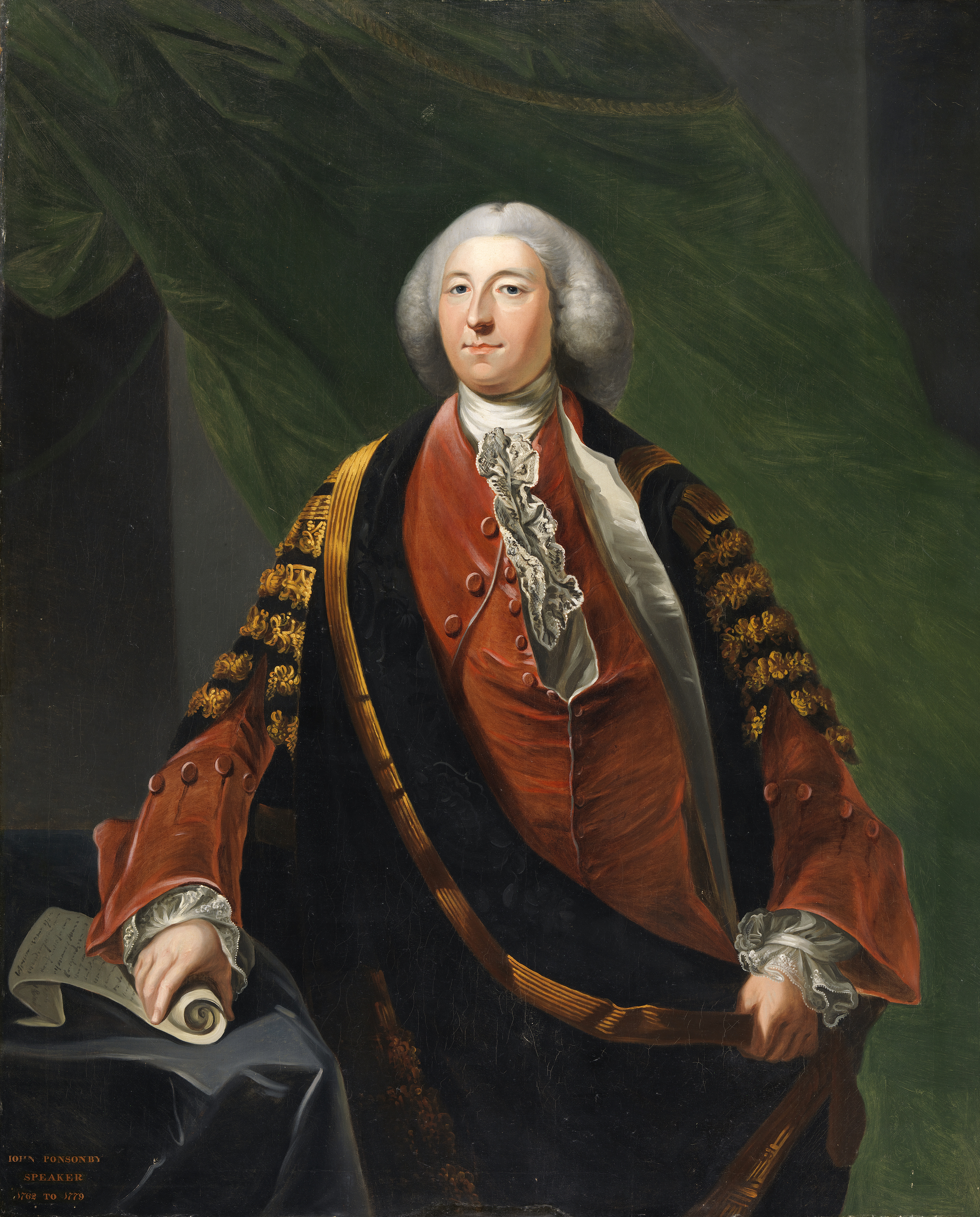
John Ponsonby, Speaker between 1756 and 1771

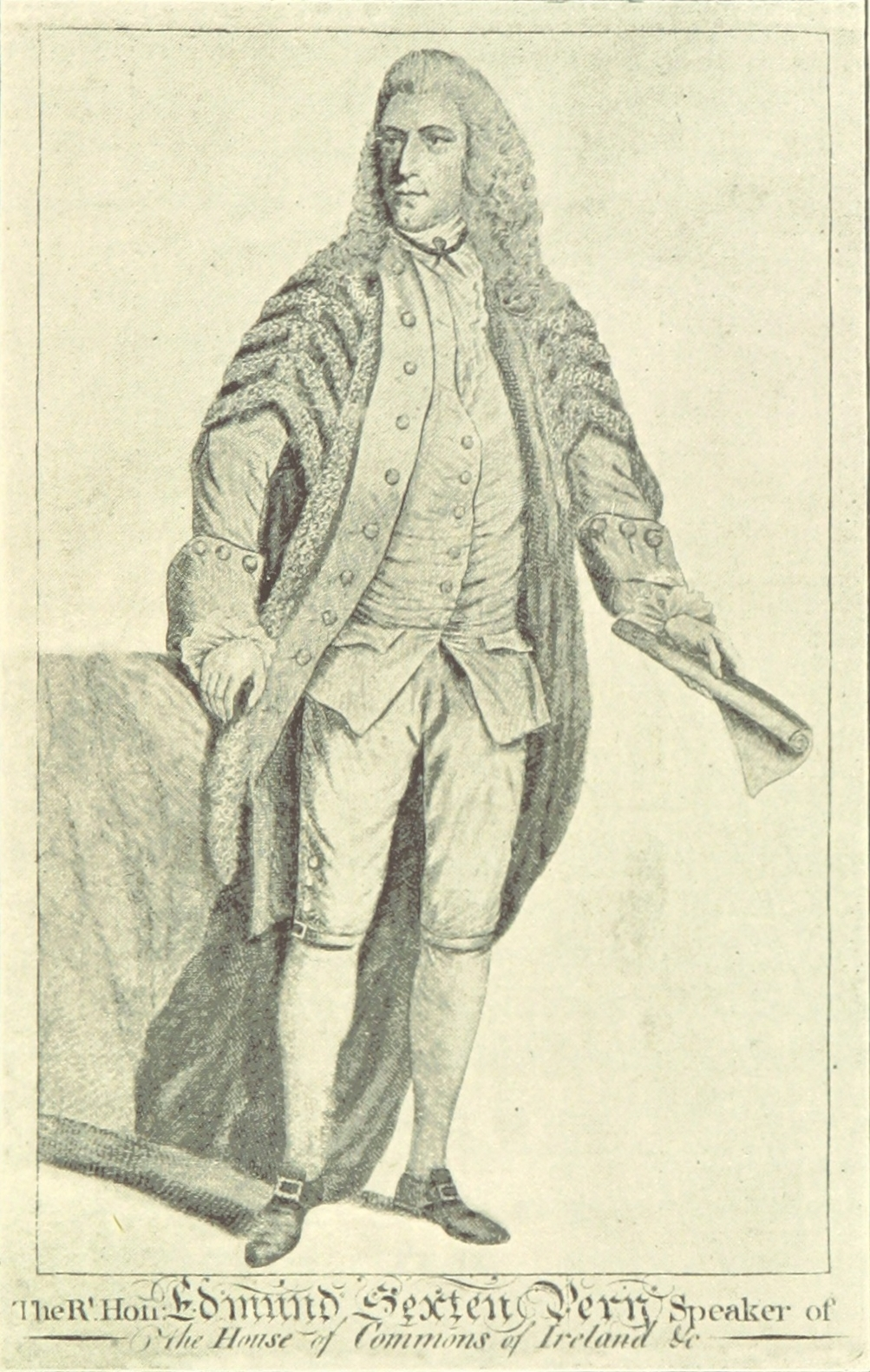
Edmund Perry, Speaker between 1771 and 1785

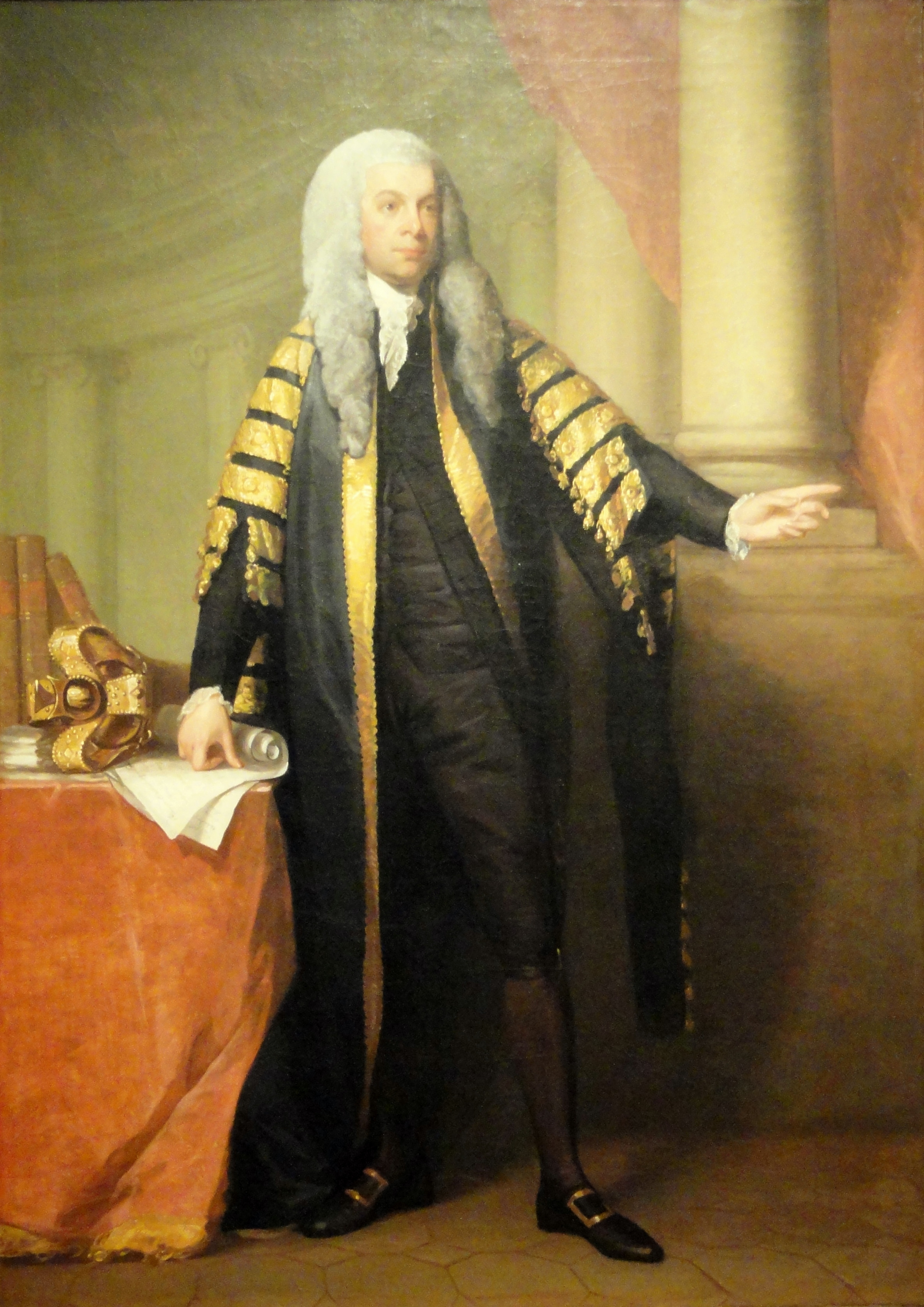
John Foster, last Speaker of the Irish House of Commons (1785–1800)

== Means of resignation ==
Until 1793, members could not resign their seats. They could cease to be a member of the House in one of four ways:

- death,
- expulsion,
- taking Holy Orders, or
- being awarded a peerage and so a seat in the Irish House of Lords.
- Standing down at election to the House.

In 1793, a means for resignation was created, equivalent to the Crown Steward and Bailiff of the Chiltern Hundreds or the Manor of Northstead as a means of resignation from the British House of Commons. From that date, Irish members could be appointed to the Escheatorship of Munster, the Escheatorship of Leinster, the Escheatorship of Connaught or the Escheatorship of Ulster. Possession of one of these Crown offices, "office of profit under the Crown" with a 30-shilling salary, terminated one's membership of the House of Commons.

== Notable members ==
- Henry Flood: Leader of the Irish Patriot Party, brought and passed the Octennial Act (reduced Parliament's term to a maximum of 8 years).
- Henry Grattan: Leader of the Irish Patriot Party after Flood, credited with being the main proponent for the Irish Constitution of 1782.
- Boyle Roche: The "father" of Irish bulls
- Hon. Arthur Wellesley: Later became Duke of Wellington, defeated Napoleon at Waterloo, and served as Prime Minister of the United Kingdom. He represented his family borough of Trim from 1790 to 1798.
- William Conolly: Speaker from 1715 to 1729. Conolly was notable not just for his role in parliament but also for his great wealth that allowed him to build one of Ireland's greatest Georgian houses, Castletown House.
- Nathaniel Clements: 1705–77 Government and Treasury Official, Managed extensive financial functions from 1720 to 1777 on behalf of the government, de facto minister for finance 1740–77, extensive property owner and developer. A major influence on the architecture of Georgian Dublin and the Irish Palladian country house.
- John Philpot Curran: Orator and wit, originator of the phrase "Eternal vigilance is the price of liberty".

== See also ==
- List of parliaments of Ireland
- History of Ireland

== Sources ==
- Mary Frances Cusack, Illustrated History of Ireland, Project Gutenberg
- Johnston-Liik, Edith Mary, ed. (2002). History of the Irish parliament, 1692–1800. Belfast: Ulster Historical Foundation.
- Johnston-Liik, Edith Mary (2006). MPs in Dublin: Companion to the History of the Irish Parliament 1692-1800. Belfast: Ulster Historical Foundation. ISBN 1903688604.
- McGrath, Charles Ivar (2000). The making of the 18th century Irish Constitution: Government, Parliament and the Revenue, 1692-1714. Dublin: Four Courts Press. ISBN 1-85182-554-1.
- Magennis, Eoin (2000). The Irish Political System 1740-1765. Dublin: Four Courts Press. ISBN 1-85182-484-7.
- Moody/Vaughan, A new history of Ireland, Oxford, 1986, ISBN 0-19-821742-0 and ISBN 0-19-821739-0
- House of Lords (1878). Return of the name of every member of the lower house of parliament of England, Scotland, and Ireland, with name of constituency represented, and date of return, from 1213 to 1874. C. Vol. 69-I. HMSO.
