= List of stewards of the Manor of Hempholme =

From 1845 until 1865, Steward of the Manor of Hempholme was one of the sinecures bestowed as an office of profit to effect resignation from the British House of Commons, similar to the current Steward of the Manor of Northstead. The reputed Manor of Hempholme, comprising 823 acres (333 ha) in what was then the parish Leven, East Riding of Yorkshire, was Crown land from before 1750 until sold in 1866 for £22,875. It was leased out until 1835. The last steward vacated the post in 1866 after being re-elected to the House of Commons.

== Stewards ==
Date	Member	Party	Constituency	Reason
21 February 1845	Charles Scott-Murray	Conservative	Buckinghamshire	
10 February 1846	Lord Arthur Lennox	Conservative	Chichester	Resigned after supporting repeal of the Corn Laws.
29 January 1852	James Whitley Deans Dundas	Liberal	Greenwich	Appointed commander-in-chief in the Mediterranean.
24 March 1852	Reginald James Blewitt	Liberal	Monmouth Boroughs	
19 April 1852	Sir John S Trelawny	Liberal	Tavistock	
29 April 1852	Sir Fitzroy Kelly	Conservative	Harwich	Resigned to contest East Suffolk
19 May 1852	Charles Pascoe Grenfell	Liberal	Preston	
30 January 1854	Robert Henry Clive	Conservative	Shropshire South	
20 October 1854	Samuel Morton Peto	Liberal	Norwich	Resigned to go to Crimean War and construct Grand Crimean Central Railway. Resigned again in 1868 from Bristol using Northstead.
9 February 1855	Lord Charles Wellesley	Conservative	Windsor	
9 July 1855	Edmond Wodehouse	Conservative	Norfolk East	
7 January 1856	Peter Rolt	Conservative	Greenwich	
22 January 1856	Thomas Babington Macaulay	Liberal	Edinburgh	ill health
28 February 1856	Gilbert Henry Heathcote	Liberal	Boston	Resigned to contest Rutland
3 July 1856	Earl of Shelburne	Liberal	Calne	Called up to the House of Lords in his father's barony of Wycombe.
25 July 1856	Edward Strutt	Liberal	Nottingham	Raised to the peerage.
11 February 1857	Thomas Bateson	Conservative	Londonderry	
16 February 1857	Lord John Manners	Conservative	Colchester	Resigned to contest North Leicestershire.
10 June 1857	James Duff	Liberal	Banffshire	Became Earl Fife on the death of his uncle.
25 August 1857	Lord Robert Grosvenor	Liberal	Middlesex	Raised to the peerage.
1 December 1857	Earl of Mulgrave	Liberal	Scarborough	Became Marquess of Normanby on the death of his father.
28 April 1858	Hugh Lyons-Montgomery	Conservative	Leitrim	
27 July 1858	Sir John Buller-Yarde-Buller	Conservative	Devonshire South	Raised to the peerage.
8 February 1859	James Whiteside	Conservative	Enniskillen	Resigned to contest Dublin University
23 June 1859	Edward Arthur Somerset	Conservative	Monmouthshire	
11 August 1859	James Wilson	Liberal	Devonport	Resigned to sit as financial member of the Council of India.
13 December 1859	William Overend	Conservative	Pontefract	
16 May 1860	Sir John Rivett-Carnac	Conservative	Lymington	
27 July 1860	John Ayshford Wise	Liberal	Stafford	
4 February 1861	Joseph Crook	Liberal	Bolton	
15 April 1861	Hugh Taylor	Conservative	Tynemouth and North Shields	
3 July 1861	Henry Rich	Liberal	Richmond	
23 July 1861	William Cubitt	Conservative	Andover	Resign to contest a by-election for the City of London, which he lost.
11 February 1862	John Biggs	Liberal	Leicester	
20 April 1862	William Roupell	Liberal	Lambeth	see Roupell case.
18 July 1862	Robert Munro-Ferguson	Liberal	Kirkcaldy Burghs	
24 July 1862	William McClintock-Bunbury	Conservative	County Carlow	
26 January 1863	Andrew Steuart	Conservative	Cambridge	
16 February 1863	Humphrey William Freeland	Liberal	Chichester	
28 May 1863	Sir John Arnott	Liberal	Kinsale	
9 October 1863	Hon. Frederick Lygon	Conservative	Tewkesbury	Resigned to contest West Worcestershire.
17 February 1864	Henry Ker Seymer	Conservative	Dorset	
1 February 1865	Francis Lyons	Liberal	Cork City	
15 June 1865	Ralph Bernal Osborne	Liberal	Liskeard	Resigned to contest Nottingham.

== See also ==
- List of Stewards of the Chiltern Hundreds
- List of Stewards of the Manor of East Hendred
- List of Stewards of the Manor of Northstead
- List of Stewards of the Manor of Old Shoreham
- List of Stewards of the Manor of Poynings
