= List of stewards of the Chiltern Hundreds =

Procedural device to allow British MPs to resign

Crown Steward and Bailiff of the three Chiltern Hundreds of Stoke, Desborough and Burnham
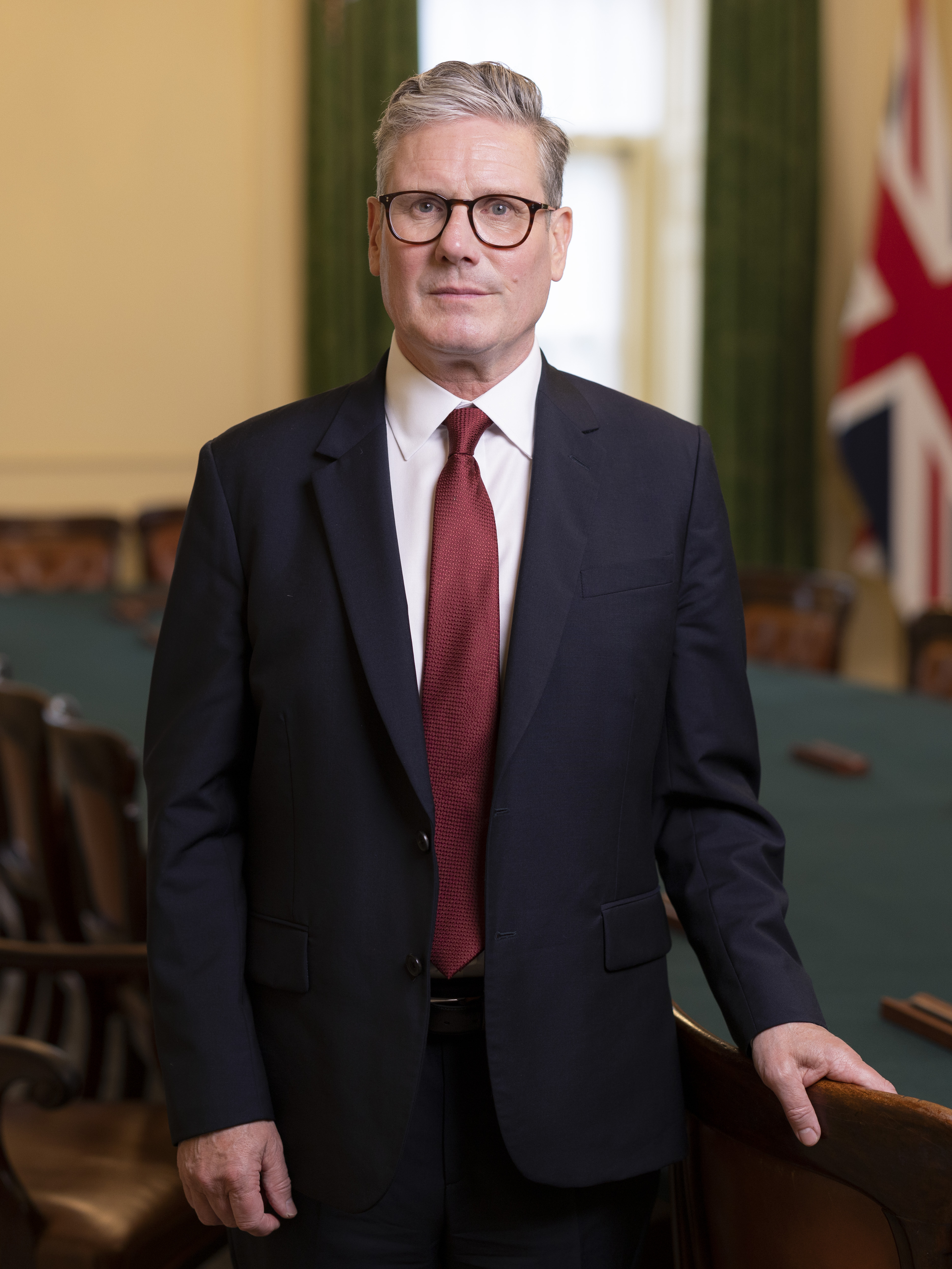
- Incumbent; Sir Keir Starmer since 1 September 2026
- Appointer: Chancellor of the Exchequer

The office of Crown Steward and Bailiff of the Chiltern Hundreds functions as a procedural device by which a member of Parliament (MP) may resign from the House of Commons of the United Kingdom. The House of Commons, by its own resolution, does not allow its members to resign. An MP who wishes to leave the House therefore effects their resignation by requesting and being appointed to the stewardship, which the House of Commons Disqualification Act 1975 designates as an office disqualifying its holder from membership of the House; the act designates the office of Steward of the Manor of Northstead in the same way. The chancellor of the exchequer traditionally makes the appointment. The MP wishing to resign is directly appointed to rather than offered the office, and hence becomes disqualified and vacates the Commons seat.

The use of the stewardship for this purpose began as a legal fiction: historically, appointment to an "office of profit under the Crown" disqualified an individual from sitting as an MP, and several such offices were used to allow MPs to resign before the disqualification was placed on its present statutory footing. The position was reworked in 1861 by William Ewart Gladstone, who was worried about the honour conferred by appointment to people such as Edwin James, who had fled to the United States while over £100,000 in debt; the standard appointment letter by the chancellor was rewritten to omit any references to honour.

The office was first used in this way on 9 February 1850 to allow Sir George Smyth, MP for Colchester, to resign his seat. Appointees to the offices of Steward of the Manor of Northstead and Steward of the Chiltern Hundreds are alternated so that two MPs can resign at once (as happened on 23 January 2017 when Tristram Hunt and Jamie Reed resigned). However, every new appointment revokes the previous one, so there is no difficulty in situations in which more than two resign, such as the 1985 walkout of Ulster Unionist MPs when several separate appointments were made on a single day. If a resigning MP wishes to contest the following by-election, as Douglas Carswell did in 2014, they must resign the stewardship to avoid further disqualification.

The steward of the Chiltern Hundreds as of September 2026 is Keir Starmer, formerly the MP for Holborn and St Pancras and, until July 2026, the Prime Minister of the United Kingdom.

== Key to party abbreviations ==
Party	Abbreviation
All-for-Ireland League	AFIL
Coalition Conservative	Co Con
Coalition Liberal	Co Lib
Conservative Party	Con
Democratic Unionist Party	DUP
English National Party	Eng Nat
Home Rule League	HRL
Independent	Ind
Irish National Federation	INF
Irish Parliamentary Party	IPP
Unspecified Irish Nationalist (pre-1922) party	Nat
Labour Party	Lab
Labour and Co-operative Party	Lab Co-op
Liberal Party (pre-1988)	Lib
Liberal Democrats	Lib Dem
Liberal Unionist Party	LU
National Labour	N Lab
National Liberal Party	N Lib
Sinn Féin	SF
Scottish National Party	SNP
Unionist Party	UP
Ulster Popular Unionist Party	UPUP
Ulster Unionist Party	UU
Whig	Whig

== 1850 to 1899 ==
Date	Name	Constituency	Party	Reason for resignation
9 February 1850	Sir George Smyth	Colchester	Con	"Age and infirmity" (Had previously been appointed to the Stewardship in 1829)
4 March 1850	Lord Albert Conyngham	Canterbury	Lib	Raised to the peerage as Baron Londesborough
12 March 1850	John Ffolliott	County Sligo	Con	[?]
30 April 1850	Hon. George Keppel	Lymington	Whig	Succeeded his brother as Earl of Albemarle
22 July 1850	Sir John Jervis	City of Chester	Lib	To become Chief Justice of the Common Pleas
3 August 1850	Viscount Northland	Dungannon	Con	Ill health
7 August 1850	Charles Pearson	Lambeth	Lib	[?]
24 December 1850	Viscount Adare	Glamorganshire	Con	Succeeded his father as Earl of Dunraven and Mount-Earl
3 February 1851	Viscount Northland	Dungannon	Con	[?]
3 February 1851	Sir John Hobhouse, Bt	Harwich	Lib	Raised to the peerage as Baron Broughton
1 March 1851	Richard Lalor Sheil	Dungarvan	Lib	Retired due to ill health and as he had been appointed Minister Plenipotentiary to the Grand Duchy of Tuscany in November 1850.
31 March 1851	Hon. Henry Cole	Enniskillen	Con	[?]
14 April 1851	William Trant Fagan	Cork City	RA	To become Commissioner of Insolvency
5 May 1851	John Simeon	Isle of Wight	Lib	After converting to Catholicism, "out of a delicate instinct of honour towards those who had elected him while he was a member of the Anglican Church — believing that he had no right to suppose them to be indifferent to the change he had made."
10 July 1851	The Earl of Surrey	Arundel	Lib	To protest the passage of the Ecclesiastical Titles Act 1851
23 July 1851	John O'Connell	Limerick City	RA	To allow the Earl of Surrey to take his place
1 August 1851	Richard Ker	Downpatrick	Con	[?]
12 September 1851	Hon. Arthur Duncombe	East Retford	Con	To become Fourth Naval Lord
25 October 1851	Benjamin Hawes	Kinsale	Lib	To become Deputy Secretary at War
29 January 1852	John Plumptre	East Kent	Con	[?]
16 March 1852	John Boyd	Coleraine	Con	[?]
20 April 1852	Francis Rufford	Worcester	Con	[?]
5 July 1853	William Evans	North Derbyshire	Whig	[?]
3 August 1853	Hon. George Anson	South Staffordshire	Lib	Appointed to command a Division in Bengal
13 August 1853	John Maguire	Dungarvan	Lib	Became Mayor of Cork
28 January 1854	Richard Prime	West Sussex	Con	[?]
5 May 1854	Musgrave Brisco	Hastings	Con	Ill health; died four days later
5 August 1854	Hon. William Gordon	Aberdeenshire	Con	[?]
11 August 1854	Lord Dudley Stuart	Marylebone	Lib	[?]
30 March 1855	Edmond Roche	County Cork	Lib	[?]
2 May 1855	William Mure	Renfrewshire	Con	[?]
6 July 1855	Charles Berkeley	Evesham	Lib	[?]
22 November 1855	Hon. Francis Child Villiers	Rochester	Con	[?]
25 January 1856	Sir Gilbert Heathcote, Bt	Rutland	Whig	[?]
3 March 1856	Charles Gavan Duffy	New Ross	Lib	[?]
2 May 1856	Charles Berkeley	Cheltenham	Lib	[?]
15 July 1856	Henry Sturt	Dorchester	Con	[?]
7 January 1857	William Biggs	Newport	Whig	[?]
17 February 1857	Charles Frewen	East Sussex	Con	[?]
23 July 1857	Lionel de Rothschild	City of London	Lib	Being Jewish, unable to swear his oath of allegiance on a Bible that contained the New Testament. A bill that would allow him to swear on the Old Testament was defeated.
30 November 1857	Hon. Francis Baring	Thetford	Con	[?]
19 December 1857	George Skene Duff	Elgin Burghs	Lib	[?]
4 November 1858	Henry Tancred	Banbury	Whig	[?]
9 February 1859	Sir John Ramsden, Bt	Hythe	Whig	[?]
9 March 1859	John Bagshaw	Harwich	Lib	[?]
2 August 1859	Henry Labouchere	Taunton	Lib	Raised to the peerage as Baron Taunton
12 August 1859	Ralph Earle	Berwick-upon-Tweed	Con	Accusations of improper financial deals with railway companies
6 March 1860	William Laslett	Worcester	Lib	[?]
4 June 1860	Richard Davison	Belfast	Con	[?]
27 August 1860	Hon. Percy Egerton Herbert	Ludlow	Con	[?]
4 February 1861	Titus Salt	Bradford	Lib	Retired due to ill health.
22 April 1861	Lachlan Gordon-Duff	Banffshire	Lib	[?]
18 July 1861	Allen Eliott-Lockhart	Selkirkshire	Con	[?]
January 1862	George Heneage	Lincoln	Lib	[?]
26 March 1862	R. A. Cross	Preston	Con	[?]
19 May 1862	Alfred Rhodes Bristow	Kidderminster	Lib	[?]
7 January 1863	Edward Ball	Cambridgeshire	Con	[?]
5 February 1863	Michael Seymour	Plymouth Devonport	Lib	[?]
14 March 1863	Maxwell Close	Armagh	Con	[?]
14 April 1863	Ion Hamilton	County Dublin	Con	[?]
28 May 1863	Charles Tottenham	New Ross	Con	[?]
4 February 1864	Sir James Buller East, Bt	Winchester	Con	[?]
11 February 1865	Daniel O'Donoghue	Tipperary	Lib	To seek election for Tralee
16 June 1865	Arthur William Buller	Plymouth Devonport	Lib	[?]
1 March 1866	William Edward Dowdeswell	Tewkesbury	Con	[?]
28 April 1866	Lord Clarence Paget	Sandwich	Whig	[?]
7 May 1866	William Leslie	Aberdeenshire	Con	[?]
8 August 1866	Hon. Charles Cust	North Shropshire	Con	[?]
5 February 1867	William Humphery	Andover	Con	[?]
5 February 1867	Sir Edward Kerrison, Bt	East Suffolk	Con	[?]
10 May 1867	David Dundas	Sutherland	Lib	[?]
26 July 1867	David Stewart Ker	Downpatrick	Con	[?]
25 November 1867	Hon. Alexander Baring	Thetford	Con	[?]
19 February 1868	Alexander Struthers Finlay	Argyllshire	Lib	[?]
14 April 1868	William Welby-Gregory	Grantham	Con	[?]
22 April 1868	Laurence Oliphant	Stirling Burghs	Lib	[?]
17 February 1869	Richard Green-Price	Radnor	Lib	[?]
28 July 1869	Edward Hamilton	Salisbury	Lib	[?]
7 February 1870	Austen Henry Layard	Southwark	Lib	[?]
9 February 1870	Henry Whitmore	Bridgnorth	Con	[?]
16 February 1870	William Lee	Maidstone	Lib	[?]
16 February 1870	Charles Ichabod Wright	Nottingham	Con	[?]
30 March 1870	Lord Courtenay	East Devon	Con	[?]
9 February 1871	Lord John Hay	Ripon	Lib	[?]
9 February 1871	Sir Thomas Burke, Bt	County Galway	Lib	[?]
22 February 1871	Edward Clive	Hereford	Lib	[?]
24 February 1871	Poulett Somerset	Monmouthshire	Con	[?]
6 February 1872	John Tollemache	West Cheshire	Con	[?]
29 February 1872	Robert Stayner Holford	East Gloucestershire	Con	[?]
17 April 1872	Richard Joseph Devereux	Wexford	Lib	[?]
28 June 1872	William Wentworth-Fitzwilliam	Southern West Riding of Yorkshire	Lib	Retired due to ill health
7 February 1873	Edward Wingfield Verner	Lisburn	Con	[?]
21 February 1873	George Legh	Mid Cheshire	Con	[?]
29 April 1873	William Philip Price	Gloucester	Lib	[?]
24 June 1873	Edmond de la Poer	County Waterford	Lib	[?]
21 July 1873	George Armitstead	Dundee	Lib	[?]
5 February 1875	George Melly	Stoke-upon-Trent	Lib	[?]
6 February 1875	Charles William White	Tipperary	Nat	[?]
15 April 1875	Francis Bassett	Bedfordshire	Lib	[?]
20 July 1875	Thomas Richardson	Hartlepool	Lib	[?]
8 February 1876	Richard Arkwright	Leominster	Con	[?]
24 April 1876	William McCombie	West Aberdeenshire	Lib	[?]
21 June 1876	George Dixon	Birmingham	Lib	[?]
28 June 1876	William Edward Dowdeswell	West Worcestershire	Con	[?]
14 July 1876	Sir Wyndham Knatchbull, Bt	East Kent	Con	[?]
31 July 1876	Charles William Nevill	Carmarthen	Con	[?]
8 February 1877	Sir Edmund Antrobus, Bt	Wilton	Lib	[?]
12 February 1877	John Crossley	Halifax	Lib	[?]
7 August 1877	Edward Corbett	South Shropshire	Con	[?]
16 January 1878	James Grieve	Greenock	Lib	[?]
29 January 1878	J. W. Henley	Oxfordshire	Con	[?]
8 March 1878	Evan Pateshall	Hereford	Con	[?]
16 April 1878	Robert William Hanbury	Tamworth	Con	[?]
6 May 1878	Sir Arthur Cowell-Stepney, Bt	Carmarthen	Lib	[?]
3 August 1878	The Marquess of Lorne	Argyllshire	Lib	[?]
15 August 1878	Edmund Buckley	Newcastle-under-Lyme	Con	[?]
5 December 1878	Kirkman Daniel Hodgson	Bristol	Lib	[?]
1 May 1879	Lewis Majendie	Canterbury	Con	[?]
3 December 1879	Samuel Danks Waddy	Barnstaple	Lib	[?]
1 May 1880	John Brinton	Kidderminster	Lib	[?]
20 May 1880	Samuel Plimsoll	Derby	Lib	[?]
23 July 1880	Sir Harcourt Vanden-Bempde-Johnstone, Bt	Scarborough	Lib	[?]
18 January 1881	Duncan McLaren	Edinburgh	Lib	[?]
5 April 1881	Sir Henry Havelock-Allan, Bt	Sunderland	Lib	[?]
3 February 1882	Alexander Martin Sullivan	Meath	HRL	[?]
18 April 1882	Vaughan Vaughan-Lee	West Somerset	Con	[?]
15 August 1882	John Dyson Hutchinson	Halifax	Lib	[?]
19 October 1882	James Cowan	Edinburgh	Lib	[?]
16 November 1882	Henry Cecil Raikes	Preston	Con	[?]
16 February 1883	Henry Joseph Gill	Westmeath	HRL	[?]
6 March 1883	John Dillon	Tipperary	IPP	[?]
6 June 1883	Michael Thomas Bass	Derby	Lib	[?]
16 June 1883	Tim Healy	Wexford	IPP	[?]
30 July 1883	Robert Henry Metge	Meath	Nat	
21 August 1883	Hon. Gerard Noel	Rutland	Con	[?]
24 January 1884	William Holms	Paisley	Lib	[?]
12 February 1884	Charles Bradlaugh	Northampton	Con	[?]
12 February 1884	George Bentinck	West Norfolk	Con	[?]
20 February 1884	William Thackeray Marriott	Brighton	Lib	[?]
7 May 1884	Edmund Filmer	Mid Kent	Con	[?]
7 May 1884	Sir Henry Peek, Bt	Mid Surrey	Con	[?]
5 August 1884	John Carpenter Garnier	South Devon	Con	[?]
8 August 1884	John Aloysius Blake	County Waterford	HRL	[?]
24 October 1884	John George Dodson	Scarborough	Lib	[?]
19 February 1885	William Gore-Langton	Mid Somerset	Con	[?]
17 February 1886	Lord Richard Grosvenor	Flintshire	Lib	[?]
8 June 1886	William O'Shea	Galway Borough	Nat	[?]
25 September 1886	Edmund Leamy	North East Cork	IPP	[?]
30 April 1887	William Copeland Borlase	St Austell	Lib	[?]
4 July 1887	Sir James McGarel-Hogg, Bt	Hornsey	Con	[?]
5 July 1887	George Sclater-Booth	North Hampshire	Con	[?]
15 July 1887	Thomas Blake	Forest of Dean	Lib	[?]
8 September 1887	John O'Connor	South Kerry	IPP	[?]
7 February 1888	Charles Lacaita	Dundee	Lib	[?]
9 February 1888	Walter Shirley Shirley	Doncaster	Lib	[?]
3 March 1888	The Earl of March	Chichester	Lib	[?]
6 April 1888	Henry Joseph Gill	Limerick City	Lib	[?]
15 May 1888	John Edmund Commerell	Southampton	Con	[?]
8 November 1888	John Simon	Dewsbury	Lib	[?]
22 February 1889	John Slagg	Burnley	Lib	[?]
27 February 1889	Robert Gent-Davis	Kennington	Con	[?]
6 April 1889	Francis Hughes-Hallett	Rochester	Con	[?]
10 July 1889	Lord Charles Beresford	Marylebone East	Con	[?]
4 March 1890	William Leatham Bright	Stoke-upon-Trent	Lib	[?]
17 March 1890	Richard Ker	East Down	Con	[?]
26 March 1890	Robert Richardson-Gardner	Windsor	Con	[?]
12 June 1890	James Edward O'Doherty	North Donegal	IPP	[?]
4 July 1891	Charles William Selwyn	Wisbech	Con	[?]
12 December 1892	Jabez Balfour	Burnley	Lib	[?]
9 May 1893	Michael Davitt	North East Cork	INF	[?]
16 June 1893	John Morrogh	South East Cork	INF	[?]
4 August 1893	William Grenfell	Hereford	Lib	[?]
8 December 1893	William Thackeray Marriott	Brighton	Con	[?]
21 March 1894	John Philipps	Mid Lanarkshire	Lib	[?]
26 June 1894	Hon. Bernard Coleridge	Sheffield Attercliffe	Lib	[?]
17 August 1894	James Allanson Picton	Leicester	Lib	[?]
21 August 1894	Patrick Chance	South Kilkenny	INF	[?]
2 April 1895	Clement Higgins	Mid Norfolk	Lib	[?]
18 May 1895	Hon. Sidney Herbert	Croydon	Con	[?]
15 June 1895	William O'Brien	Cork City	INF	[?]
24 August 1895	Alfred Webb	West Waterford	INF	[?]
19 February 1896	Thomas Sexton	North Kerry	INF	[?]
24 April 1896	William Hunter	Aberdeen North	Lib	[?]
20 November 1896	Martin White	Forfar	Lib	[?]
16 January 1897	Alfred Wigram	Romford	Con	[?]
2 February 1897	Sir George Trevelyan, Bt	Glasgow Bridgeton	Lib	[?]
4 February 1897	Charles Harvey Combe	Chertsey	Con	[?]
5 February 1898	Alfred Hopkinson	Cricklade	LU	[?]
22 April 1898	Francis Taylor	South Norfolk	LU	[?]
2 July 1898	James Dampier Palmer	Gravesend	Con	[?]
21 July 1898	George Doughty	Great Grimsby	Lib	[?]
7 February 1899	William Kenrick	Birmingham North	LU	[?]
17 February 1899	Thomas Wayman	Elland	Lib	[?]
16 June 1899	Sir John Austin, Bt	Osgoldcross	Lib	[?]
1 July 1899	Robert Grant Webster	St Pancras East	Con	[?]
26 October 1899	Hon. Henry Northcote	Exeter	Con	[?]

== 1900 to 1949 ==
Date	Name	Constituency	Party	Reason for resignation
26 January 1900	Lord Charles Beresford	City of York	Con	Appointed second-in-command of the Mediterranean Fleet.
27 January 1900	Bernard Collery	North Sligo	INF	[?]
14 March 1900	Evelyn Hubbard	Brixton	Con	On the advice of his doctors
11 December 1900	Sir Matthew White Ridley, Bt	Blackpool	Con	[?]
9 January 1902	Edward Brodie Hoare	Hampstead	Con	Ill health
1 February 1902	Michael McCartan	South Down	IPP	Ill health
7 February 1902	James Daly	South Monaghan	IPP	Refusal of party leaders to publish the names of those members who were receiving payment from the Parliamentary fund and those who were not
18 April 1902	Edwin Hughes	Woolwich	Con	[?]
7 October 1902	Cathcart Wason	Orkney and Shetland	LU	To stand again as an Independent Liberal.
27 October 1902	Augustus Frederick Warr	Liverpool East Toxteth	Con	Found the workload of Parliament to be incompatible with his legal work in Liverpool and his wife's long-term illness.
17 February 1903	William Edward Hartpole Lecky	Dublin University	LU	Ill health
5 March 1903	Edward Archdale	North Fermanagh	Con	[?]
1 January 1904	William O'Brien	Cork City	AFIL	[?]
22 March 1904	J. E. B. Seely	Isle of Wight	Con	To stand again as Independent Conservative
8 June 1904	John Lockie	Plymouth Devonport	Con	Ill health
16 June 1904	John Arthur Fyler	Chertsey	Con	Bankruptcy
11 February 1905	John Archibald Willox	Liverpool Everton	Con	Ill health
28 June 1905	Arthur Hill	West Down	Con	[?]
19 March 1906	Henry Broadhurst	Leicester	Lib	[?]
7 May 1906	Frederick Rutherfoord Harris	Dulwich	Con	[?]
11 June 1906	Heneage Legge	Westminster St George's	Con	[?]
10 December 1906	Daniel Sheehan	Mid Cork	IPP	To stand again as Independent Nationalist
12 February 1907	Harold James Reckitt	Brigg	Lib	[?]
1 May 1907	William Evans-Gordon	Stepney	Con	[?]
10 June 1907	Denis Joseph Cogan	East Wicklow	IPP	[?]
1 July 1907	James O'Mara	South Kilkenny	IPP	[?]
15 August 1907	Edward Blake	South Longford	Lib	Ill health following a stroke
22 January 1908	William Alexander McArthur	St Austell	Lib	[?]
22 February 1908	Harvey du Cros	Hastings	Con	Ill health
23 April 1908	Henry Fowler	Wolverhampton East	Lib	Raised to the peerage as Viscount Wolverhampton
28 April 1908	Edmund Robertson	Dundee	Lib	Raised to the peerage as Baron Lochee
29 June 1908	John Philipps	Pembrokeshire	Lib	[?]
10 February 1909	John Sinclair	Forfar	Lib	[?]
27 March 1909	William O'Brien	Cork City	IPP	[?]
23 April 1909	J. Batty Langley	Sheffield Attercliffe	Lib	[?]
25 June 1909	Herbert Samuel	Cleveland	Lib	[?]
22 February 1910	Sir William Holland, Bt	Rotherham	Lib	[?]
20 February 1911	Thomas Fleming Wilson	North East Lanarkshire	Lib	[?]
15 March 1911	Lord Alwyne Compton	Brentford	Con	[?]
27 April 1911	Viscount Morpeth	Birmingham South	LU	[?]
28 June 1911	Thomas Ashton	Luton	Lib	[?]
4 July 1911	Sir Alexander Fuller-Acland-Hood, Bt	Wellington	CU	[?]
5 July 1911	John Muldoon	East Wicklow	IPP	[?]
27 October 1911	Alfred Emmott	Oldham	Lib	[?]
8 March 1912	John Hendley Morrison Kirkwood	South East Essex	Con	[?]
13 March 1912	Sir James Rankin, Bt	Leominster	Con	[?]
16 May 1912	Horatio Bottomley	Hackney South	Lib	[?]
30 July 1912	George Kemp	Manchester North West	Lib	[?]
14 November 1912	George Lansbury	Bow and Bromley	Lab	[?]
5 February 1913	Lord Balniel	Chorley	Con	[?]
2 June 1913	Sir Henry Kimber, Bt	Wandsworth	Con	[?]
19 January 1914	William O'Brien	Cork City	AFIL	[?]
26 May 1914	Richard Hazleton	North Galway	IPP	[?]
7 July 1914	Austen Chamberlain	East Worcestershire	Con	To contest Birmingham West
16 February 1915	Viscount Castlereagh	Maidstone	Con	[?]
3 December 1915	William Walker	Widnes	Con	[?]
6 January 1916	Sir Alexander Henderson, Bt	Westminster St George's	Con	[?]
13 January 1916	Hon. Harry Levy-Lawson	Mile End	LU	[?]
22 February 1916	Robert Yerburgh	City of Chester	Con	[?]
24 February 1916	John Rolleston	Hertford	Con	[?]
6 March 1916	Paddy Logan	Harborough	Lib	[?]
8 April 1916	Henry Chaplin	Wimbledon	Con	[?]
7 August 1916	Reginald Pole-Carew	Bodmin	LU	[?]
10 October 1916	Felix Cassel	St Pancras West	Con	[?]
27 November 1916	The Earl of Ronaldshay	Hornsey	Con	[?]
16 December 1916	Charles Stuart-Wortley	Sheffield Hallam	Con	[?]
21 December 1916	Sir John Dewar, Bt	Inverness-shire	Lib	[?]
10 February 1917	The Marquess of Tullibardine	West Perthshire	Con	[?]
22 March 1917	Arthur Annesley	Oxford	Con	[?]
7 May 1917	Charles Henry Lyell	Edinburgh South	Lib	[?]
19 June 1917	Amelius Lockwood	Epping	Con	[?]
12 January 1918	Sir John Lonsdale, Bt	Mid Armagh	Con	[?]
14 March 1918	William Redmond	East Tyrone	IPP	[?]
12 June 1918	Denison Faber	Clapham	Con	[?]
4 November 1918	Timothy Michael Healy	North East Cork	AFIL	[?]
21 March 1919	Robert McCalmont	East Antrim	Con	Appointed to command the Irish Guards
22 October 1919	John Wilkinson Taylor	Chester-le-Street	Lab	[?]
29 October 1919	Hon. Waldorf Astor	Plymouth Sutton	Co Con	[?]
2 December 1919	Henry Forster	Sevenoaks	Co Con	[?]
8 February 1920	Will Crooks	Woolwich East	Lab	[?]
15 February 1920	Sydney Arnold	Penistone	Lab	[?]
9 March 1920	George Wardle	Stockport	Co Lab	[?]
25 March 1920	James Clyde	Edinburgh North	Co Con	[?]
7 July 1920	Robert Francis Peel	Woodbridge	Co Con	[?]
25 November 1920	William Brace	Abertillery	Lab	[?]
17 December 1920	Viscount Duncannon	Dover	Co Con	[?]
18 March 1921	Dennis Boles	Taunton	Co Con	[?]
15 April 1921	Lord Edmund Talbot	Chichester	Co Con	[?]
24 May 1921	Walter Long	Westminster St George's	Co Con	[?]
9 January 1922	Henry Newton Knights	Camberwell North	Co Con	[?]
27 February 1922	Thomas Brash Morison	Inverness	Co Lib	[?]
26 May 1922	Sir William Mount, Bt	Newbury	Co Con	[?]
27 November 1922	Herbert Cayzer	Portsmouth South	Co Con	[?]
13 February 1923	Thomas Worsfold	Mitcham	Co Con	[?]
15 February 1923	William Rutherford	Liverpool Edge Hill	Co Con	[?]
10 November 1923	Hon. Alexander Shaw	Kilmarnock	Lib	[?]
26 April 1924	Sir Robert Houston, Bt	Liverpool West Toxteth	Co Con	[?]
19 July 1924	Sir Ellis Ellis-Griffith, Bt	Carmarthen	Lib	[?]
25 May 1925	Sir John Baird, Bt	Ayr Burghs	Con	[?]
15 February 1926	Herbert Fisher	Combined English Universities	Lib	[?]
30 April 1926	Ellis Ashmead-Bartlett	Hammersmith North	Con	[?]
24 August 1926	Hon. Donald Howard	North Cumberland	Con	[?]
4 November 1926	Hon. Joseph Kenworthy	Kingston upon Hull Central	Lib	[?]
30 November 1926	John Davison	Smethwick	Lab	[?]
9 March 1927	Leslie Haden-Guest	Southwark North	Lab	[?]
9 June 1927	Sir Davison Dalziel, Bt	Brixton	Con	[?]
7 June 1928	Sir Alfred Mond, Bt	Carmarthen	Con	[?]
18 June 1928	Sir Rowland Blades, Bt	Epsom	Con	[?]
12 July 1929	William Jowitt	Preston	Lib	[?]
9 April 1930	Ernest Spero	Fulham West	Lab	[?]
17 June 1930	Noel Buxton	North Norfolk	Lab	[?]
3 February 1931	John Humphrey Davidson	Fareham	Con	[?]
16 February 1931	Hugh Morrison	Salisbury	Con	[?]
20 April 1931	Sidney Herbert	Scarborough and Whitby	Con	[?]
3 June 1931	John Tinné	Liverpool Wavertree	Con	[?]
4 April 1932	Newton Moore	Richmond upon Thames	Con	[?]
7 June 1932	Sir Robert Hutchinson	Montrose Burghs	N Lib	[?]
6 February 1933	George Herbert	Rotherham	Con	[?]
16 February 1934	Viscount Lymington	Basingstoke	Con	[?]
30 May 1934	Lord Erskine	Weston-super-Mare	Con	[?]
22 May 1935	John Buchan	Combined Scottish Universities	UP	Following appointment as Governor General of Canada
9 July 1935	Hilton Young	Sevenoaks	Con	[?]
18 April 1936	Viscount Borodale	Peckham	Con	[?]
11 June 1936	James Henry Thomas	Derby	N Lab	[?]
19 October 1936	William Kirkpatrick	Preston	Con	[?]
14 January 1937	Ian Fraser	St Pancras North	Con	[?]
16 March 1937	Philip Russell Rendel Dunne	Stalybridge and Hyde	Con	[?]
25 May 1937	Robert Stevenon Horne	Glasgow Hillhead	UP	[?]
1 June 1937	Stanley Baldwin	Bewdley	Con	[?]
3 June 1937	Hon. Walter Runciman	St Ives	N Lib	[?]
26 October 1937	Lord Eustace Percy	Hastings	Con	
28 November 1938	The Duchess of Atholl	Kinross and Western Perthshire	UP	To protest the appeasement of Adolf Hitler.
27 March 1939	Hon. Arthur Hope	Birmingham Aston	Con	[?]
1 July 1939	John Herbert	Monmouth	Con	[?]
6 November 1939	John Remer	Macclesfield	Con	[?]
24 January 1940	Sir Charles Barrie	Southampton	N Lib	[?]
29 January 1940	Alan Garrett Anderson	City of London	Con	[?]
8 February 1940	John Birchall	Leeds North East	Con	[?]
10 April 1940	Nicholas Grattan-Doyle	Newcastle upon Tyne North	Con	[?]
18 June 1940	Harry Nathan	Wandsworth Central	Lab	To provide a seat for Ernest Bevin
12 July 1940	Bernard Cruddas	Wansbeck	Con	[?]
18 September 1940	Thomas Sinclair	Queen's University of Belfast	UU	[?]
11 November 1940	Viscount Wolmer	Aldershot	Con	Called up to the House of Lords in his father's barony of Selborne by writ of acceleration
3 April 1941	Frederick Roberts	West Bromwich	Lab	[?]
11 July 1941	Sir Hugh Seely, Bt	Berwick-upon-Tweed	Lib	Raised to the peerage as Baron Sherwood
10 November 1941	Lord Erskine	Brighton	Con	[?]
25 February 1942	Sir Victor Warrender, Bt	Grantham	Con	Raised to the peerage as Baron Bruntisfield
9 April 1942	John Moore-Brabazon	Wallasey	Con	Publicly expressed the hope that Germany and Britain's ally the Soviet Union, then engaged in the Battle of Stalingrad, would destroy each other.
9 July 1942	Gordon Macdonald	Ince	Lab	Appointed Regional Controller for the Ministry of Fuel and Power for the Lancashire, Cheshire, and North Wales Region
14 January 1943	John Colville	Midlothian and Peebles Northern	Con	Appointed Governor of Bombay
20 September 1943	Lord Burghley	Peterborough	Con	Appointed Governor of Bermuda
24 January 1944	Tom Kennedy	Kirkcaldy Burghs	Lab	[?]
7 February 1944	Cecil Wilson	Sheffield Attercliffe	Lab	Ill health
26 February 1946	Ted Williams	Ogmore	Lab	Appointed British High Commissioner to Australia
24 May 1946	Francis Douglas	Battersea North	Lab	Appointed Governor of Malta
2 October 1946	Clarice Shaw	Kilmarnock	Lab	Ill health
16 October 1946	John Boyd Orr	Combined Scottish Universities	Ind	Concentrating on work as Director General of the Food and Agriculture Organization
4 November 1946	Sir Douglas Thomson, Bt	Aberdeen South	Con	Pressure of business
3 November 1947	Sir Archibald Southby, Bt	Epsom	Con	Ill health
1 March 1948	Tom Williamson	Brigg	Lab	Concentrating on work as General Secretary of the GMWU
2 July 1948	George Buchanan	Glasgow Gorbals	Lab	Appointed Chairman of the National Assistance Board
19 December 1949	Jack Lawson	Chester-le-Street	Lab	Appointed vice-chairman of the National Parks Commission

== 1950 to 1999 ==
Date	Name	Constituency	Party	Reason for resignation
25 October 1950	Hon. Sir Stafford Cripps	Bristol South East	Lab	Medical advice
22 March 1951	Sir Ronald Ross, Bt	Londonderry	Con	Appointed Agent of the Government of Northern Ireland in London
11 May 1951	Rhys Davies	Westhoughton	Lab	Ill health
8 October 1952	Hon. Sir Hugh O'Neill	North Antrim	Con	Retirement
21 January 1953	Sidney Schofield	Barnsley	Lab	Personal and domestic reasons
14 February 1953	Hon. Edward Carson	Isle of Thanet	Con	Ill health
3 June 1953	Peter Bennett	Birmingham Edgbaston	Con	Raised to the peerage as Baron Bennett of Edgbaston
27 October 1953	William J. Field	Paddington North	Lab	Convicted of importuning for immoral purposes
15 January 1954	Richard Law	Haltemprice	Con	Raised to the peerage as Baron Coleraine
12 February 1954	William Cuthbert	Arundel and Shoreham	Con	Ill health
3 October 1954	Sidney Marshall	Sutton and Cheam	Con	Ill health
28 November 1954	Lord Malcolm Douglas-Hamilton	Inverness	Con	Ill health; to help economic development of the Highlands through private enterprise
7 May 1956	Gerald Wellington Williams	Tonbridge	Con	Ill health
26 November 1956	Stanley Evans	Wednesbury	Lab	Requested to resign by his Constituency Labour Party after supporting the Government over the Suez Crisis
2 May 1957	William Darling	Edinburgh South	Con	Ill health
8 November 1957	Victor Raikes	Liverpool Garston	Con	To take up a business appointment in Southern Rhodesia
18 April 1958	Angus Maude	Ealing South	Con	To become editor of The Sydney Morning Herald.
1 June 1961	Hon. David Ormsby-Gore	Oswestry	Con	Appointed British Ambassador to the United States
29 November 1961	Hilary Marquand	Middlesbrough East	Lab	Appointed Director of the Institute of Labour Studies at the International Labour Office
22 January 1962	George Chetwynd	Stockton-on-Tees	Lab	Appointed Director of the North East Development Council
6 June 1963	John Profumo	Stratford-on-Avon	Con	Confessed to misleading the House (the Profumo affair)
9 March 1964	Peter Smithers	Winchester	Con	Appointed Secretary General of the Council of Europe
24 June 1965	Anthony Marlowe	Hove	Con	Medical advice
29 September 1967	William Roots	Kensington South	Con	Ill health
15 January 1968	Leslie Hale	Oldham West	Lab	Ill health
6 February 1969	William Teeling	Brighton Pavilion	Con	Ill health
7 March 1969	Francis Noel-Baker	Swindon	Lab	Ill health
11 January 1971	Horace King	Southampton Itchen	Speaker	Retiring Speaker of the House of Commons
30 March 1972	Ray Gunter	Southwark	Ind	Had left the Labour Party; decided it would be improper to remain as an independent having been elected as Labour
29 December 1972	George Thomson	Dundee East	Lab	Appointed a European Commissioner
1 June 1973	Antony Lambton	Berwick-upon-Tweed	Con	Prostitution scandal
27 August 1976	John Stonehouse	Walsall North	Eng Nat	Convicted on 18 counts of theft and fraud, sentenced to seven years' imprisonment
12 November 1976	David Lane	Cambridge	Con	Appointed Chairman of the Commission for Racial Equality
5 January 1977	Roy Jenkins	Birmingham Stechford	Lab	Appointed President of the European Commission
16 June 1977	Brian Walden	Birmingham Ladywood	Lab	In order to become a broadcast journalist on Weekend World
6 April 1978	Peter Rawlinson	Epsom and Ewell	Con	Retiring from the Commons; was made a life peer
24 October 1979	Geoffrey Dodsworth	South West Hertfordshire	Con	Medical advice
1 November 1982	Bob Mellish	Bermondsey	Ind	Left the Labour Party in opposition to the selection of his successor; to become vice-chairman of the London Docklands Development Corporation
17 December 1985	James Molyneaux	Lagan Valley	UUP	Seeking re-election in protest at the Anglo-Irish Agreement
17 December 1985	Roy Beggs	East Antrim	UUP	Seeking re-election in protest at the Anglo-Irish Agreement
17 December 1985	Harold McCusker	Armagh	UUP	Seeking re-election in protest at the Anglo-Irish Agreement
17 December 1985	William Ross	Londonderry	UUP	Seeking re-election in protest at the Anglo-Irish Agreement
17 December 1985	John Taylor	Strangford	UUP	Seeking re-election in protest at the Anglo-Irish Agreement
17 December 1985	James Kilfedder	North Down	UPUP	Seeking re-election in protest at the Anglo-Irish Agreement
17 December 1985	Jim Nicholson	Newry and Armagh	UUP	Seeking re-election in protest at the Anglo-Irish Agreement
17 December 1985	William McCrea	Mid Ulster	DUP	Seeking re-election in protest at the Anglo-Irish Agreement
24 June 1986	John Golding	Newcastle-under-Lyme	Lab	Elected General Secretary of the National Communications Union
18 October 1988	Bruce Millan	Glasgow Govan	Lab	Appointed a European Commissioner
18 May 1989	Stuart Holland	Vauxhall	Lab	In order to take up a lectureship at the European University Institute
20 January 1995	Neil Kinnock	Islwyn	Lab	Appointed a European Commissioner
28 June 1999	Alastair Goodlad	Eddisbury	Con	Appointed British High Commissioner to Australia

== Since 2000 ==
Date	Member	Constituency	Party	Reason for resignation
23 October 2000	Betty Boothroyd	West Bromwich West	Speaker	Retiring as Speaker of the House of Commons.
22 June 2004	Terry Davis	Birmingham Hodge Hill	Lab	Appointed Secretary-General of the Council of Europe.
27 June 2007	Tony Blair	Sedgefield	Lab	Appointed Envoy of the Quartet on the Middle East.
18 June 2008	David Davis	Haltemprice and Howden	Con	Seeking re-election in protest to the Counter-Terrorism Act 2008.
8 June 2009	Ian Gibson	Norwich North	Lab	Alleged misuse of allowances led to his being ruled ineligible for selection as a Labour candidate by an NEC panel.
13 January 2010	Iris Robinson	Strangford	DUP	Ill health; followed allegations about her personal life.
8 February 2011	Eric Illsley	Barnsley Central	Lab	Pleaded guilty to false accounting in relation to claims for parliamentary expenses.
2 March 2012	Marsha Singh	Bradford West	Lab	Ill health.
22 October 2012	Alun Michael	Cardiff South and Penarth	Lab	To contest the Police and Crime Commissioner election for South Wales Police Force Area.
5 November 2012	Denis MacShane	Rotherham	Lab	Standards and Privileges Committee of the House of Commons recommended that he be suspended from the service of the House for six months, for knowingly submitting false invoices.
5 February 2013	Chris Huhne	Eastleigh	Lib Dem	Pleaded guilty to perverting the course of justice.
30 April 2014	Patrick Mercer	Newark	Ind	Elected as Conservative, but had quit the whip at the commencement of investigations on 31 May 2013. The Standards Committee of the House of Commons agreed a report recommending he be suspended from the service of the House for six months for breaking the rule against paid advocacy.
30 September 2014	Mark Reckless	Rochester and Strood	Con	To seek re-election as a UKIP candidate.
9 May 2016	Sadiq Khan	Tooting	Lab	Elected as Mayor of London.
26 October 2016	Zac Goldsmith	Richmond Park	Con	Seeking re-election having pledged to do so should the Government endorse a third runway at Heathrow Airport.
23 January 2017	Tristram Hunt	Stoke-on-Trent Central	Lab	To direct the Victoria and Albert Museum.
16 January 2018	Barry McElduff	West Tyrone	SF	Became embroiled in a controversy over the Kingsmill massacre on social media.
28 October 2019	John Mann	Bassetlaw	Lab	Nomination to House of Lords announced in 2019 Prime Minister's Resignation Honours. No by-election held due to the 2019 general election being called.
16 March 2021	Mike Hill	Hartlepool	Lab	Pending sexual harassment tribunal.
10 May 2021	Tracy Brabin	Batley and Spen	Lab Co-op	Election as Mayor of West Yorkshire.
3 May 2022	Imran Ahmad Khan	Wakefield	Con	Criminal conviction for sexual assault. Elected as Conservative in 2019, suspended from the party in June 2021 pending a trial. Expelled after he was convicted in April 2022.
21 October 2022	Chris Matheson	City of Chester	Lab	Independent Expert Panel parliamentary watchdog recommended he be suspended for "serious sexual misconduct".
30 November 2022	Rosie Cooper	West Lancashire	Lab	To take up the role of chair of Mersey Care NHS Foundation Trust.
12 June 2023	Boris Johnson	Uxbridge and South Ruislip	Con	Resignation after being handed draft results of investigation into allegations he misled Parliament over Partygate.
29 August 2023	Nadine Dorries	Mid Bedfordshire	Con	Resigned regarding a dispute relating to not receiving a peerage in Johnson's resignation honours. The appointment came 81 days after she announced her resignation "with immediate effect".
8 January 2024	Chris Skidmore	Kingswood	Con	Resigned over disagreements with the Government's policy on net zero.
17 March 2025	Mike Amesbury	Runcorn and Helsby	Lab	Resigned after receiving a suspended prison sentence for assaulting a constituent.
14 May 2026	Stephen Gethins	Arbroath and Broughty Ferry	SNP	Resigned after being elected to the Scottish Parliament for Dundee City East, and as per the Scottish Elections (Representation and Reform) Act 2025, individuals are banned from holding both a seat in the Scottish Parliament and the House of Commons.
18 May 2026	Josh Simons	Makerfield	Lab	Resigned to trigger a by-election in order for Andy Burnham to stand for election to the House of Commons.
1 September 2026	Sir Keir Starmer	Holborn and St Pancras	Lab	Resigned after retiring as Prime Minister, to focus on world affairs.

== See also ==
=== Office still in use ===
- List of stewards of the Manor of Northstead

=== Offices no longer in use ===
- List of Stewards of the Manor of East Hendred
- List of Stewards of the Manor of Hempholme
- List of Stewards of the Manor of Old Shoreham
- List of Stewards of the Manor of Poynings
