= List of stewards of the Manor of Northstead =

Procedural device to allow British MPs to resign

Crown Steward and Bailiff of the Manor of Northstead
- Incumbent; Vacant since 13 August 2026
- Appointer: Chancellor of the Exchequer

The office of Crown Steward and Bailiff of the Manor of Northstead functions as a procedural device to allow a member of Parliament (MP) to resign from the House of Commons of the United Kingdom. The House of Commons, by its own resolution, does not allow its members to resign their seats. To leave the House, an MP is instead appointed to an office that disqualifies them from membership; the appointment itself effects the resignation, and the MP does not have to accept the office. Under section 4 of the House of Commons Disqualification Act 1975, the stewardships of the Manor of Northstead and of the Chiltern Hundreds are specifically designated as disqualifying offices for this purpose. The appointment is traditionally made by the chancellor of the exchequer.

The office was first used in this way on 20 March 1844 to allow Sir George Henry Rose, MP for Christchurch, to resign his seat. Before the disqualification was placed on its modern statutory footing, it rested on the older rule that appointment to an "office of profit under the Crown" vacated a member's seat, employed as a legal fiction to circumvent the prohibition on resignation; several other such offices were also used historically. The position was reworked in 1861 by William Ewart Gladstone, who was worried about the honour conferred by appointment to people such as Edwin James, who had fled to the United States over £100,000 in debt. As such, the letter by the chancellor was rewritten to omit any references to honour. Appointees to the offices of Steward of the Manor of Northstead and Steward of the Chiltern Hundreds are alternated so that two MPs can resign at once (as happened on 23 January 2017 when Tristram Hunt and Jamie Reed resigned). However, every new appointment revokes the previous one, so there is no difficulty in situations in which more than two resign, such as the 1985 walkout of Ulster Unionist MPs when several separate appointments were made on a single day. If a resigning MP wishes to contest the following by-election, as Douglas Carswell did in 2014, they need to resign the stewardship to avoid further disqualification.

The position of steward of the Manor of Northstead is vacant after Nigel Farage, leader of Reform UK, was reelected as an MP for Clacton.

== Key to party abbreviations ==
Party	Abbreviation
All-for-Ireland League	AFIL
Coalition Conservative	Co Con
Coalition Liberal	Co Lib
Conservative Party	Con
Democratic Unionist Party	DUP
Home Rule League	HRL
Independent	Ind
Irish National Federation	INF

Party	Abbreviation
Irish Parliamentary Party	IPP
Unspecified Irish Nationalist (pre-1922) party	Nat
Irish Unionist Alliance	IUA
Labour Party (UK)	Lab
Liberal Party (pre-1988)	Lib
Liberal Nationals	L Nat
Liberal Unionist Party	LU
National Labour	N Lab

Party	Abbreviation
Plaid Cymru	PC
Reform UK	Ref
Scottish National Party	SNP
Sinn Féin	SF
Ulster Unionist Party	UUP
Unionist Party	UP
Whig	Whig

== Up to 1899 ==
Date	Name	Constituency	Party	Reason for resignation	Ref
20 March 1844	George Henry Rose	Christchurch	Con		
21 January 1846	Francis Murphy	Cork City	Whig		
5 February 1846	The Lord Henniker	East Suffolk	Con	In anticipation of being raised to the peerage as Baron Hartismere|	
22 November 1852	James Emerson Tennent	Lisburn	Con	Appointed secretary to the Board of Trade|	
27 December 1852	Edward Howard	Morpeth	Whig		
15 August 1853	John Charles Herries	Stamford	Con		
27 January 1854	Robert Inglis	Oxford University	Con		
13 February 1854	William Edward Powell	Ceredigion	Con		
5 May 1854	Henry Tufnell	Plymouth Devonport	Whig		
July 1854	Francis Charles Lawley	Beverley	Whig	Found to have been using his position as secretary to the Chancellor of the Exchequer for insider trading|	
26 March 1855	William Philip Price	Gloucester	Whig	Resigned to accept a contract for supplying huts to the army in the Crimea|	
25 May 1855	Thomas Phinn	Bath	Whig	Appointed Second Secretary to the Admiralty|	
22 January 1856	John Blackett	Newcastle-upon-Tyne	Whig		
23 January 1856	Viscount Dalrymple	Wigtownshire	Whig		
23 May 1856	The Lord Waterpark	Lichfield	Whig		
5 January 1857	Robert Price	Hereford	Whig		
23 February 1857	John MacGregor	Glasgow	Whig		
27 July 1857	William Egerton	North Cheshire	Con		
26 August 1857	George Byng	Tavistock	Whig	To allow him to stand for the vacant Middlesex parliamentary seat|	
1 December 1857	Edward Dering	East Kent	Whig		
December 1857	Charles Compton Cavendish	Buckinghamshire	Whig	In anticipation of being raised to the peerage as Baron Chesham|	
2 February 1859	George Alexander Hamilton	Dublin University	Con	Appointed Assistant Secretary to the Treasury|	
8 February 1859	John Townsend	Greenwich	Whig		
16 February 1859	Viscount Ebrington	Marylebone	Whig		
25 February 1859	Samuel Warren	Midhurst	Con	Appointed a Master in Lunacy under the Lunacy Act 1845|	
6 August 1859	William Michell	Bodmin	Lib		
12 August 1859	Ralph Grey	Liskeard	Lib		
25 July 1860	John Arthur Wynne	Sligo	Con		
10 April 1861	Edwin James	Marylebone	Lib	Resigned and fled to the United States with massive debts|	
18 June 1861	Henry White	Longford	Lib		
24 July 1861	Lord John Russell	City of London	Lib	In anticipation of being raised to the peerage as Earl Russell|	
27 January 1862	Henry Butler-Johnstone	Canterbury	Con		
25 April 1862	William Johnson Fox	Oldham	Lib		
23 January 1863	Charles Moody	West Somerset	Con		
11 February 1863	Jonathan Richardson	Lisburn	Con		
8 May 1863	Daniel O'Connell	Tralee	Lib		
28 July 1863	Richard Monckton Milnes	Pontefract	Lib	In anticipation of being raised to the peerage as Baron Houghton|	
6 February 1864	William Coningham	Brighton	Lib	Ill-health	
6 April 1864	William Garnett	Lancaster	Con		
6 March 1865	T. H. S. Sotheron-Estcourt	North Wiltshire	Con		
21 February 1866	Charles Wood	Ripon	Lib		
20 March 1866	James Lindsay	Wigan	Con		
2 May 1866	Stafford Northcote	Stamford	Con	Resigned to contest North Devon|	
19 July 1866	Edward Kerrison	Eye	Con	To allow him to stand for election to one of the East Suffolk parliamentary seats; he resigned again in 1867 becoming a Steward of the Chiltern Hundreds	
5 February 1867	Taverner Miller	Colchester	Con		
8 March 1867	Meaburn Staniland	Boston	Lib		
6 June 1867	Henry Gridley	Weymouth and Melcombe Regis	Lib	Ill-health	
12 August 1867	George Julius Poulett Scrope	Stroud	Lib		
12 February 1868	Alexander Beresford Hope	Stoke-on-Trent	Con		
3 April 1868	Alexander Henry Campbell	Launceston	Con		
14 April 1868	Arthur Walsh	Leominster	Con		
22 April 1868	Samuel Morton Peto	Bristol	Lib	Gave up his seat after being declared bankrupt; had previously resigned from Norwich in 1854 by becoming Steward of Hempholme	
9 August 1869	George Traill	Caithness	Lib		
7 February 1870	Anthony Lefroy	Dublin University	Con		
15 February 1870	William Scott	Roxburghshire	Lib		
9 February 1871	Joshua Westhead	City of York	Lib		
6 February 1872	George Loch	Wick Burghs	Lib		
5 February 1875	George Elliot	Chatham	Con	Appointed Commander-in-Chief of HMNB Portsmouth|	
8 February 1876	Richard Fellowes Benyon	Berkshire	Con		
9 February 1876	John Burgess Karslake	Huntingdon	Con		
4 August 1876	Robert Meek Carter	Leeds	Lib		
23 February 1877	James Henry Deakin	Launceston	Con		
17 January 1878	Donald Robert Macgregor	Leith Burghs	Lib		
25 February 1878	Henry Munro-Butler-Johnstone	Canterbury	Con		
8 March 1878	Ralph Neville-Grenville	Mid Somerset	Con		
4 May 1878	John Gilbert Talbot	West Kent	Con		
20 July 1878	Henry Ferguson Davie	Haddington Burghs	Lib		
3 August 1878	John Malcolm	Boston	Con		
5 December 1878	George Sandford	Maldon	Con		
10 March 1879	Ralph Shuttleworth Allen	East Somerset	Con		
18 February 1880	Benjamin Whitworth	Kilkenny City	HRL		
4 May 1880	Edward Knatchbull-Hugessen	Sandwich	Lib		
18 May 1880	Alexander Martin Sullivan	County Louth	HRL		
20 May 1880	Percy Bernard	Bandon	Con		
24 July 1880	John George Dodson	City of Chester	Lib	Resigned to contest Scarborough, which was vacated via the Chiltern Hundreds the previous day, in anticipation of his election being declared void on petition (as happened in August 1880)|	
22 January 1881	Joseph Foley	New Ross	HRL		
24 August 1881	Benjamin Rodwell	Cambridgeshire	Con		
6 February 1882	Charles Russell	Westminster	Con		
11 August 1882	David Wedderburn	Haddington Burghs	Lib		
15 September 1882	James Lysaght Finegan	Ennis	HRL		
16 February 1883	Ashton Wentworth Dilke	Newcastle-upon-Tyne	Lib		
1 March 1883	William Carington	Chipping Wycombe	Lib		
13 June 1883	Hampden Whalley	Peterborough	Lib		
20 June 1883	Charles James Murray	Hastings	Con		
14 August 1883	Samuel Ruggles-Brise	East Essex	Con		
16 November 1883	Mordaunt Bisset	West Somerset	Con		
11 February 1884	John Daly	Cork City	Nat		
20 February 1884	William Welby-Gregory	South Lincolnshire	Con		
5 June 1884	Lord Henry Douglas-Scott-Montagu	South Hampshire	Con		
20 June 1884	Peter Alfred Taylor	Leicester	Lib		
6 August 1884	Alexander Matheson	Ross and Cromarty	Lib		
23 October 1884	Samuel Williams	New Radnor	Lib		
14 November 1884	James Stewart	Greenock	Lib		
6 March 1885	George Anderson	Glasgow	Lib		
24 February 1886	Octavius Vaughan Morgan	Battersea	Lib		
7 August 1886	Michael Bass	Burton	Lib		
31 January 1887	Lord Algernon Percy	St. George's, Hanover Square	Con		
4 July 1887	Henry Eaton	Coventry	Con		
12 July 1887	Ernest Baggallay	Brixton	Con		
24 July 1887	Edward Russell	Glasgow Bridgeton	Lib		
7 February 1888	Arthur Cohen	Southwark West	Lib		
9 February 1888	Thomas Buchanan	Edinburgh West	Lib		
18 February 1888	William Evelyn	Deptford	Con		
7 March 1888	Charles James	Merthyr Tydvil	Lib		
16 April 1888	Stephen Mason	Mid Lanarkshire	Lib		
14 June 1888	Edward Joseph Kennedy	South Sligo	Nat		
4 August 1888	Lord Claud Hamilton	Liverpool West Derby	Con		
14 December 1888	Joseph Dodds	Stockton	Lib		
25 February 1889	Courtney Stanhope Kenny	Barnsley	Lib		
11 March 1889	John Hooper	South East Cork	IPP		
21 June 1889	Robert Preston Bruce	West Fife	Lib		
17 February 1890	Thomas Mayne	Mid Tipperary	IPP		
12 March 1890	John Sinclair	Ayr Burghs	Lib		
19 May 1890	Patrick O'Hea	West Donegal	IPP		
24 June 1890	William Sproston Caine	Barrow-in-Furness	Lib		
22 October 1891	John Redmond	North Wexford	IPP		
27 February 1893	Henri Josse	Great Grimsby	Lib		
2 June 1893	Peter McLagan	Linlithgowshire	Lib		
17 July 1893	John Deasy	West Mayo	INF		
30 October 1893	John Barry	South Wexford	INF		
15 March 1894	Stuart Rendel	Montgomeryshire	Lib		
26 April 1894	Charles Russell	Hackney South	Lib		
10 August 1894	Lord Walter Gordon-Lennox	Chichester	Con		
17 August 1894	James Whitehead	Leicester	Lib		
2 February 1895	Herbert Naylor-Leyland	Colchester	Con		
8 April 1895	John Sweetman	East Wicklow	IPP		
22 May 1895	Donald MacGregor	Inverness-shire	Lib		
22 June 1895	J. F. X. O'Brien	South Mayo	INF		
5 February 1896	John Shiress Will	Montrose Burghs	Lib	Resigned so that John Morley could be elected|	
22 March 1896	J. E. Kenny	Dublin College Green	IPP		
16 May 1896	John Pender	Wick Burghs	LU		
16 January 1897	Edward Hulse	Salisbury	Con		
20 February 1897	William Rawson Shaw	Halifax	Lib		
15 March 1898	Frederick Seager Hunt	Maidstone	Con		
30 April 1898	Harold Finch-Hatton	Newark	Con		
9 July 1898	Lord Arthur Hill	West Down	IUA		
10 August 1898	George Curzon	Southport	Con		
9 December 1898	Edmund Vesey Knox	Londonderry City	IPP		
1 February 1899	Arthur Dyke Acland	Rotherham	Lib		
11 February 1899	Hugh McCalmont	North Antrim	IUA		
16 June 1899	James Bevan Edwards	Hythe	Con		
26 June 1899	James Francis Oswald	Oldham	Con		
16 October 1899	Lionel Holland	Bow and Bromley	Con		
26 October 1899	Michael Davitt	South Mayo	INF	Resigned as he opposed the government's South Africa policy	

== 1900 to 1949 ==
Date	Name	Constituency	Party	Reason for resignation
26 January 1900	Sir John Maden	Rossendale	Lib	"... circumstances have arisen that render it impossible for me any longer to retain the trust which you have generously reposed in me ..."
10 February 1900	Sir Edward Clarke	Plymouth	Con	Requested to resign by his constituents in a disagreement over his views expressed
23 April 1900	Walter Clough	Portsmouth	Lib	Following a judgement against him in the Law Courts
3 July 1901	Oliver Young	Wokingham	Con	Ill-health
13 January 1902	Mark Oldroyd	Dewsbury	Lib	To concentrate on business interests
4 February 1902	Patrick McDermott	North Kilkenny	IPP	
10 April 1902	James Boyle	West Donegal	IPP	
29 April 1902	James Kenyon	Bury	Con	Ill-health
21 October 1902	Alfred Pease	Cleveland	Lib	Ill-health
12 February 1903	Sir John Kinloch, Bt	East Perthshire	Lib	"wished to be relieved of his Parliamentary duties at the earliest time convenient to the constituency"
26 February 1903	Lord Charles Beresford	Woolwich	Con	Appointed Commander of the Channel Fleet
12 May 1903	Matthew Minch	South Kildare	IPP	
8 March 1904	Sir William Mather	Rossendale	Lib	
1 June 1904	Paddy Logan	Harborough	Lib	
15 June 1904	John William Mellor	Sowerby	Lib	Ill-health
28 July 1904	George William Palmer	Reading	Lib	
11 February 1905	Richard Rigg	Appleby	Lib	Change of his political opinions different from the leadership of the Liberal Party
14 February 1906	Hon. Alban Gibbs	City of London	Con	To allow the former Prime Minister Arthur Balfour to stand as a candidate to re-enter parliament after he lost his seat in the 1906 Election.
19 March 1906	Francis Seymour Stevenson	Eye	Lib	On appointment as the Second Church Estates Commisioner
7 June 1906	Sir Edward Clarke	City of London	Con	Ill-health
13 October 1906	Charles Ramsay Devlin	Galway City	IPP	In order to travel to Canada
12 February 1907	James Bryce	Aberdeen South	Lib	Appointed Ambassador to the United States
27 April 1907	Charles Eric Hambro	Wimbledon	Con	To concentrate on business interests
28 May 1907	Charles Barrington Balfour	Hornsey	Con	
10 June 1907	Patrick O'Hare	North Monaghan	IPP	
4 July 1907	Sir James Kitson, Bt	Colne Valley	Lib	
21 August 1907	Harry Liddell	West Down	IUA	
30 January 1908	Charles Dolan	North Leitrim	IPP	
28 February 1908	Lord Arthur Hill	West Down	IUA	
27 April 1908	John Morley	Montrose Burghs	Lib	
1 June 1908	George Whiteley	Pudsey	Lib	
17 November 1908	Sir Carne Rasch, Bt	South East Essex	Con	Ill-health
11 February 1909	Sir Edward Boyle, Bt	Taunton	Con	Ill health.
8 April 1909	Thomas Kincaid-Smith	Stratford-on-Avon	Lib	To seek the decision of his constituents on the question of the adoption of military training.
12 May 1909	Sir Lewis McIver, Bt	Edinburgh West	LU	
21 February 1910	Sir Balthazar Foster	Ilkeston	Lib	In order to allow J. E. B. Seely to return to Parliament
3 February 1911	Sir John Fuller, Bt	Westbury	Lib	Appointed Governor of Victoria
13 March 1911	Thomas Sandys	Bootle	Con	
15 April 1911	Ernest Soares	Barnstaple	Lib	
26 June 1911	Archibald Corbett	Glasgow Tradeston	Lib	On being created 1st Baron Rowallan
28 June 1911	Aretas Akers-Douglas	St Augustine's	Con	On being created Viscount Chilston
5 July 1911	Moreton Frewen	North East Cork	AFIL	Objection to the Parliament Bill
20 July 1911	Edward Pickersgill	Bethnal Green South West	Lib	On appointment as a stipendiary magistrate
1 March 1912	John Arkwright	Hereford	Con	
8 March 1912	William Keswick	Epsom	Con	Ill-health
10 April 1912	James Morrison	Nottingham East	Con	
4 June 1912	Henry Wilson	Holmfirth	Lib	Ill health.
4 November 1912	Hon. William Peel	Taunton	Con	On becoming the 2nd Viscount Peel on the death of his father.
20 January 1913	The Marquess of Hamilton	Londonderry City	IUA	On becoming the 3rd Duke of Abercorn on the death of his father
1 May 1913	John Kebty-Fletcher	Altrincham	Con	Ill health.
17 June 1913	Eliot Crawshay-Williams	Leicester	Lib	On being divorced
11 February 1914	Ronald Munro-Ferguson	Leith Burghs	Lib	Appointed Governor-General of Australia
23 June 1914	John Gordon	Brighton	Con	Ill-health
11 February 1915	Gerald Kyffin-Taylor	Liverpool Kirkdale	Con	Military commitments in the 1st West Lancs. Brigade Royal Field Artillery
13 October 1915	Sir Lancelot Sanderson	Appleby	Con	On appointment as Chief Justice of the High Court of Judicature in Calcutta.
3 January 1916	Cecil Norton	Newington West	Lib	On becoming the 1st Baron Rathcreedan.
8 January 1916	Lord Charles Beresford	Portsmouth	Con	On becoming the 1st Baron Beresford.
18 February 1916	Hon. John Lyttelton	Droitwich	LU	
23 February 1916	Sir Wilfrid Lawson, Bt	Cockermouth	Lib	
24 February 1916	Thomas Taylor	Bolton	Lib	
13 March 1916	Francis Neilson	Hyde	Lib	
7 July 1916	Sir Edward Grey, Bt	Berwick-upon-Tweed	Lib	
21 August 1916	Hon. Harold Henderson	Abingdon	Con	Appointed military secretary to the Duke of Devonshire, who was to become Governor General of Canada in November 1916
16 October 1916	Godfrey Fetherstonhaugh	North Fermanagh	IUA	Ill-health
16 December 1916	Sir Max Aitken, Bt	Ashton-under-Lyne	LU	
21 December 1916	Sir Thomas Roe	Derby	Lib	On becoming the 1st Baron Roe.
21 December 1916	Sir Stuart Samuel, Bt	Whitechapel	Lib	
14 February 1917	Francis Newdegate	Tamworth	Con	Appointed Governor of Tasmania
24 March 1917	George Esslemont	Aberdeen South	Lib	Ill health
18 June 1917	Richard Chaloner	Liverpool Abercromby	Con	On becoming Baron Gisborough.
19 July 1917	Almeric Paget	Cambridge	Con	
15 January 1918	Sir Frederick Cawley, Bt	Prestwich	Lib	On becoming Baron Cawley
27 May 1918	Sir Gilbert Parker, Bt	Gravesend	Con	Ill-health
15 October 1918	Cecil Cochrane	South Shields	Lib	
13 February 1919	Hugh Anderson	North Londonderry	IUA	
18 August 1919	William Walker	Widnes	Co Con	
28 October 1919	Sir Ian Malcolm	Croydon South	Co Con	
20 November 1919	Sir Hildred Carlile, Bt	St Albans	Co Con	Ill-health
2 February 1920	Archibald Weigall	Horncastle	Co Con	On appointment as Governor of South Australia
11 February 1920	Sir Hallewell Rogers	Birmingham Moseley	Co Con	
16 February 1920	Sir Henry Dalziel, Bt	Kirkcaldy	Co Lib	
15 March 1920	Sir Auckland Geddes	Basingstoke	Co Con	Appointed Ambassador to the United States
2 June 1920	Albert Smith	Nelson and Colne	Lab	
14 July 1920	Thomas Richards	Ebbw Vale	Lab	
30 November 1920	William Abraham	Rhondda, West	Lab	
22 December 1920	Charles Pulley	Hereford	Co Con	"owing to the pressing demands of his own business on the Stock Exchange"
13 April 1921	Laurance Lyon	Hastings	Co Con	
27 April 1921	Hon. James Lowther	Penrith and Cockermouth	Co Con	
24 May 1921	Albert Illingworth	Heywood and Radcliffe	Co Lib	
27 May 1921	Noel Pemberton Billing	Hertford	Ind	
23 February 1922	Sir Eric Campbell Geddes	Cambridge	Co Con	
2 May 1922	Sir Arthur Du Cros, Bt	Wandsworth, Clapham	Co Con	
12 June 1922	Sir Archibald Williamson, Bt	Moray and Nairn	Co Lib	
12 February 1923	Herbert Pease	Darlington	Con	
14 February 1923	Sir Harry Mallaby-Deeley, Bt	Willesden, East	Con	
26 July 1923	Leslie Wilson	Portsmouth, South	Con	Appointed Governor of Bombay
18 January 1924	Sir Frederick Banbury, Bt	City of London	Con	
18 June 1924	William Campion	Lewes	Con	Appointed Governor of Western Australia
25 May 1925	Sir George Ambrose Lloyd	Eastbourne	Con	
11 November 1925	Hon. E. F. L. Wood	Ripon	Con	
14 April 1926	Sir Guy Gaunt	Buckrose	Con	Cited as co-respondent in the divorce case between Sir Richard Cruise and his wife
29 June 1926	Sir Patrick Hastings	Wallsend	Lab	
3 November 1926	Hon. Stanley Jackson	Howdenshire	Con	
4 November 1926	Sir Henry Curtis-Bennett	Chelmsford	Con	Sued for divorce by his wife
15 February 1927	William Wedgwood Benn	Edinburgh Leith	Lib	Leaving the Liberal Party
9 May 1927	Robert Gee	Bosworth	Con	
4 November 1927	Ronald McNeill	Canterbury	Con	
8 June 1928	Sir James Remnant, Bt	Holborn	Co Con	
20 June 1928	John Henry Whitley	Halifax	Lib	
11 November 1929	Sir Edward Iliffe	Tamworth	Con	
7 May 1930	Sir Albert Bennett	Nottingham, Central	Con	
16 January 1931	Hon. Henry Mond	Liverpool, East Toxteth	Con	
4 February 1931	Thomas Mardy Jones	Pontypridd	Lab	Found to have allowed his wife and daughter to use House of Commons rail travel vouchers
19 March 1931	Henry Snell	Woolwich, East	Lab	
1 May 1931	Sir Frank Nelson	Stroud	Con	To focus on business interests
25 February 1932	John Thom	Dunbartonshire	UP	On appointment as Puisne Judge of the High Court of Judicature of Allahabad
11 April 1932	Sir Rennell Rodd	St. Marylebone	Con	Decided to "retire from the strenuous life of Parliament"; he was aged in his early 70s
4 July 1932	Otho Nicholson	Westminster, Abbey	Con	
9 August 1933	The Earl Castle Stewart	Harborough	Con	Ill health.
23 April 1934	Alfred Chotzner	Upton	Con	Ill health.
28 January 1935	Godfrey Wilson	Cambridge University	Con	On appointment at Vice-Chancellor of Cambridge University
17 June 1935	Edward Grenfell	City of London	Con	On becoming Baron St Just
18 February 1936	Hon. Archibald Cochrane	Dunbartonshire	UP	On appointment as Governor of Burma
11 June 1936	Sir Alfred Butt, Bt	Wandsworth, Balham and Tooting	Con	
1 July 1936	Sir Henry Cautley, Bt	East Grinstead	Con	
13 January 1937	William Ray	Richmond	Con	
29 January 1937	Lord Hugh Cecil	Oxford University	Con	
14 April 1937	Roger Lumley	York	Con	On appointment as Governor of Bombay
27 May 1937	Sir Walter Preston	Cheltenham	Con	Ill-health
1 June 1937	Sir J. C. C. Davidson	Hemel Hempstead	Con	Retired following the resignation of Prime Minister Stanley Baldwin
7 June 1937	George Hamilton	Ilford	Con	Ill health.
2 May 1938	Michael Beaumont	Aylesbury	Con	
8 March 1939	Malcolm Barclay-Harvey	Kincardine and Western Aberdeenshire	UP	On appointment as Governor of South Australia
29 June 1939	Sir Herbert Cayzer, Bt	Portsmouth, South	Con	On being created Baron Rotherwick
11 October 1939	Sir Sam Tom Rosbotham	Ormskirk	N Lab	On reaching the age of 75
28 November 1939	Sir William Lane-Mitchell	Wandsworth, Streatham	Con	On reaching the age of 79
26 January 1940	David Williams	Swansea East	Lab	
7 February 1940	Jack Jones	West Ham, Silvertown	Lab	Ill health and failing eyesight.
2 April 1940	William Sanders	Battersea, North	Lab	Ill health.
1 June 1940	Hon. Glyn Mason	Croydon, North	Con	
24 June 1940	Charles Kerr	Montrose Burghs	L Nat	
12 July 1940	William Kelly	Rochdale	Lab	Ill health.
11 November 1940	Sir Mervyn Manningham-Buller, Bt	Northampton	Con	
10 February 1941	Sir Reginald Dorman-Smith	Petersfield	Con	On appointment as Governor of Burma.
9 June 1941	Sir Philip Colfox, Bt	Dorset, Western	Con	
18 August 1941	Sir Paul Latham, Bt	Scarborough and Whitby	Con	On being arrested and sent for court-martial
24 November 1941	James Guy	Edinburgh Central	Con	
9 April 1942	David Margesson	Rugby	Con	On being created Viscount Margesson
6 July 1942	Joseph Batey	Spennymoor	Lab	Ill-health
14 January 1943	Sir Patrick Spens	Ashford	Con	On appointment as Chief Justice of India
3 June 1943	John Gretton	Burton	Con	On being created Baron Gretton
17 January 1944	Sir Alfred Cooper Rawson	Brighton	Con	Ill-health
24 January 1944	Henry Hunloke	West Derbyshire	Con	"Too busy" serving with his Regiment to attend properly to parliamentary duties
6 March 1945	George Morrison	Combined Scottish Universities	L Nat	
10 May 1946	Jennie Adamson	Bexley	Lab	Appointed Deputy Chairman of the Unemployment Assistance Board
12 September 1946	Sir Ben Smith	Rotherhithe	Lab	Appointed Chairman of the West Midlands Divisional Coal Board, under the National Coal Board
11 October 1946	Tom Smith	Normanton	Lab	Appointed Labour director of the North-Eastern Divisional Coal Board, under the National Coal Board
22 October 1946	Noel Mason-MacFarlane	Paddington, North	Lab	Ill health
20 October 1947	Clifford Glossop	Howdenshire	Con	Ill health
29 January 1948	Henry Willink	Croydon, North	Con	Appointed Master of Magdalene College, Cambridge
6 April 1948	John Hanbury Martin	Southwark Central	Lab	Ill-health
8 February 1949	John Belcher	Sowerby	Lab	Found to have accepted gifts from a "fixer" to influence his conduct as a minister

== 1950 to 1999 ==
Date	Name	Constituency	Party	Reason for resignation
20 March 1950	Harry Morris	Sheffield, Neepsend	Lab	Vacating his seat so that Solicitor-General Sir Frank Soskice could return to Parliament
3 February 1951	Sir Ronald Cross, Bt	Ormskirk	Con	Appointed Governor of Tasmania
30 March 1951	Norman Bower	Harrow, West	Con	Ill-health
8 October 1952	Conolly Gage	Belfast South	UUP	Ill-health
12 January 1953	John Baker White	Canterbury	Con	Ill-health
31 January 1953	Walter Ayles	Hayes and Harlington	Lab	Ill-health
3 June 1953	Sir Ralph Glyn, Bt	Abingdon	Con	Created a Baron (coronation honours list); vacating his seat to allow an early election
14 October 1953	Malcolm Bullock	Crosby	Con	Ill-health
8 January 1954	Viscount Cranborne	Bournemouth, West	Con	Ill-health
12 February 1954	Christopher York	Harrogate	Con	Ill-health
5 November 1954	Richard Harden	Armagh	UUP	Giving up a political career in order to concentrate on farming the family estate
22 March 1955	Sir Richard Acland, Bt	Gravesend	Lab	Seeking re-election as a candidate opposed to British development of the hydrogen bomb
16 November 1956	Anthony Nutting	Melton	Con	Opposed to Government policy on the Suez Crisis
11 January 1957	Sir Anthony Eden	Warwick and Leamington	Con	Ill-health; had retired as Prime Minister
29 October 1957	Charles Waterhouse	Leicester, South East	Con	Concentrating on business life involving frequent visits to Africa
1 April 1958	Sir Hartley Shawcross	St. Helens	Lab	Unable to devote his full time to Parliamentary activities
24 November 1958	Ian Harvey	Harrow, East	Con	Charged with gross indecency with a Coldstream guardsman in St James's Park
8 June 1961	James Carmichael	Glasgow, Bridgeton	Lab	Ill-health
13 December 1961	Sir Geoffrey de Freitas	Lincoln	Lab	Appointed High Commissioner to Ghana
7 March 1962	Edward Wakefield	West Derbyshire	Con	Appointed High Commissioner to Malta
30 July 1963	Malcolm St Clair	Bristol, South East	Con	To allow Tony Benn, who won the previous election but was disqualified due to inheriting an unwanted peerage, to regain his seat after being allowed to disclaim the peerage
19 March 1965	Aubrey Jones	Birmingham, Hall Green	Con	Appointed Chairman of the Prices and Incomes Board
5 December 1966	Frank Cousins	Nuneaton	Lab	Concentrating on work as General Secretary of the Transport and General Workers' Union
25 October 1967	Aidan Crawley	West Derbyshire	Con	Appointed Chairman of London Weekend Television
25 July 1968	Oliver Crosthwaite-Eyre	New Forest	Con	Ill-health
2 April 1970	Will Owen	Morpeth	Lab	Charged under the Official Secrets Act
3 February 1971	Walter Alldritt	Liverpool, Scotland	Lab	Appointed Regional Secretary, National Union of General and Municipal Workers
16 October 1972	Dick Taverne	Lincoln	Lab	Seeking re-election on leaving the Labour Party
16 February 1973	Maurice Foley	West Bromwich	Lab	Appointed Deputy Director General for Development by the European Community
11 February 1976	Selwyn Lloyd	Wirral	Speaker	Retiring as Speaker of the House of Commons
12 October 1976	Edward Short	Newcastle-upon-Tyne, Central	Lab	Appointed Chairman of Cable & Wireless
5 January 1977	Christopher Tugendhat	City of London and Westminster South	Con	Appointed a European Commissioner
5 April 1977	David Marquand	Ashfield	Lab	Appointed Chief Advisor to the President of the European Commission
25 July 1977	John Cordle	Bournemouth East	Con	Found in contempt of the House (Poulson scandal)
6 November 1978	John Davies	Knutsford	Con	Ill-health
5 May 1982	Bruce Douglas-Mann	Mitcham and Morden	Lab	Seeking re-election on joining the Social Democratic Party
19 January 1984	Eric Varley	Chesterfield	Lab	Appointed Executive Deputy Chairman of Coalite plc
17 December 1985	Ian Paisley	North Antrim	DUP	Seeking re-election in protest at the Anglo-Irish Agreement
17 December 1985	Clifford Forsythe	South Antrim	UUP	Seeking re-election in protest at the Anglo-Irish Agreement
17 December 1985	Ken Maginnis	Fermanagh and South Tyrone	UUP	Seeking re-election in protest at the Anglo-Irish Agreement
17 December 1985	Peter Robinson	Belfast East	DUP	Seeking re-election in protest at the Anglo-Irish Agreement
17 December 1985	Martin Smyth	Belfast South	UUP	Seeking re-election in protest at the Anglo-Irish Agreement
17 December 1985	Cecil Walker	Belfast North	UUP	Seeking re-election in protest at the Anglo-Irish Agreement
17 December 1985	Enoch Powell	South Down	UUP	Seeking re-election in protest at the Anglo-Irish Agreement
17 April 1986	Matthew Parris	West Derbyshire	Con	Appointed as a presenter of Weekend World
1 October 1986	Robert Kilroy-Silk	Knowsley North	Lab	Appointed as a presenter of Day To Day
31 December 1988	Leon Brittan	Richmond	Con	Appointed a European Commissioner
16 May 1994	Bryan Gould	Dagenham	Lab	Appointed Vice-Chancellor of the University of Waikato
27 October 1997	Piers Merchant	Beckenham	Con	Revelations of an affair with a 17-year-old nightclub hostess

== Since 2000 ==
Date	Name	Constituency	Party	Reason for resignation
10 January 2000	Cynog Dafis	Ceredigion	PC	Elected a member of the National Assembly for Wales
21 November 2000	Dennis Canavan	Falkirk West	Lab	Elected a Member of the Scottish Parliament
8 September 2004	Peter Mandelson	Hartlepool	Lab	Appointed a European commissioner
4 June 2008	Boris Johnson	Henley	Con	Elected Mayor of London
30 June 2008	David Marshall	Glasgow East	Lab	Ill health
22 June 2009	Michael Martin	Glasgow North East	Speaker	Retiring as Speaker of the House of Commons
26 January 2011	Gerry Adams	Belfast West	SF	To stand in the 2011 Irish general election
1 April 2011	Peter Soulsby	Leicester South	Lab	To stand for election as Mayor of Leicester
29 August 2012	Louise Mensch	Corby	Con	To join her family in New York
22 October 2012	Tony Lloyd	Manchester Central	Lab	To stand for election as Police and crime commissioner for the Greater Manchester Police Force Area
2 January 2013	Martin McGuinness	Mid Ulster	SF	To end double-jobbing as Member of Parliament and Member of the Northern Ireland Assembly
15 April 2013	David Miliband	South Shields	Lab	To become head of the International Rescue Committee in New York
29 August 2014	Douglas Carswell	Clacton	Con	Seeking re-election, having joined the UK Independence Party
23 March 2016	Huw Irranca-Davies	Ogmore	Lab	To contest the 2016 Welsh Assembly election
12 September 2016	David Cameron	Witney	Con	Due to concerns that remaining a backbench MP following his resignation as Prime Minister on 13 July 2016 would be "a big distraction and a big diversion" from the work of the new government
4 November 2016	Stephen Phillips	Sleaford and North Hykeham	Con	"Significant policy differences" with the government regarding their approach to the UK leaving the European Union
23 January 2017	Jamie Reed	Copeland	Lab	To become Head of Development and Community Relations for Sellafield Ltd
9 May 2018	Heidi Alexander	Lewisham East	Lab	To become Deputy Mayor of London for Transport
4 November 2019	John Bercow	Buckingham	Speaker	Retiring as Speaker of the House of Commons
24 March 2021	Neil Gray	Airdrie and Shotts	SNP	To seek election at the 2021 Scottish Parliament election
5 November 2021	Owen Paterson	North Shropshire	Con	Breaching the rules against paid advocacy
4 May 2022	Neil Parish	Tiverton and Honiton	Con	Viewed pornography in the Palace of Westminster
10 November 2022	Kate Green	Stretford and Urmston	Lab	To become Deputy Mayor of Greater Manchester
12 June 2023	Nigel Adams	Selby and Ainsty	Con	Resignation in solidarity with Boris Johnson
19 June 2023	David Warburton	Somerton and Frome	Con	Allegations of sexual harassment and drug abuse
7 September 2023	Chris Pincher	Tamworth	Con	Allegations of sexual misconduct
25 March 2024	Scott Benton	Blackpool South	Con	Filmed appearing to offer lobbying favours for payment
23 January 2026	Andrew Gwynne	Gorton and Denton	Lab	Following his suspension from the Labour Party, he resigned due to "significant ill-health"
14 May 2026	Stephen Flynn	Aberdeen South	SNP	Resigned after being elected to the Scottish Parliament for Aberdeen Deeside and North Kincardine, and as per the Scottish Elections (Representation and Reform) Act 2025, individuals are banned from holding both a seat in the Scottish Parliament and the House of Commons.
8 July 2026	Nigel Farage	Clacton	Ref	Resigned to contest by-election after controversy over his finances.

== Dual appointments ==
Some former MPs have held both offices of Steward of the Manor of Northstead and of the Chiltern Hundreds at different times due to multiple resignations. These include:

- William Philip Price
- William Welby-Gregory
- Lord Charles Beresford
- John William Logan
- Boris Johnson

== See also ==
=== Office still in use ===
- List of stewards of the Chiltern Hundreds

=== Offices no longer in use ===
- List of stewards of the Manor of East Hendred
- List of stewards of the Manor of Hempholme
- List of stewards of the Manor of Old Shoreham
- List of stewards of the Manor of Poynings
