= Resignation from the House of Commons of the United Kingdom =

UK parliamentary procedure

As a constitutional convention, members of Parliament (MPs) sitting in the House of Commons of the United Kingdom are not formally permitted to resign their seats. To circumvent this prohibition, MPs who wish to step down are instead appointed to an "office of profit under the Crown"; by law, such an appointment disqualifies them from sitting in the House of Commons. For this purpose, a legal fiction has been maintained whereby two unpaid sinecures are considered to be offices of profit: Steward and Bailiff of the Chiltern Hundreds, and Steward and Bailiff of the Manor of Northstead.

Since the passage of the House of Commons Disqualification Act 1975, "offices for profit" are no longer disqualifying in general, but the explicit list of hundreds of disqualifying offices contained in the act now includes the two stewardships so that this convention can be continued. It is rare for an MP to be nominated to a legitimate office of profit on the disqualifying list; no MPs have lost their seat by being appointed to an actual office since 1981, when Thomas Williams became a judge.

== Offices used for disqualification ==
Members of Parliament (MPs) wishing to give up their seats before the next general election are appointed to an office which causes the MP to be disqualified from membership. Historically, all "offices of profit under the Crown" could be used for this purpose. Only two are still in use:

- Crown Steward and Bailiff of the three Chiltern Hundreds of Stoke, Desborough and Burnham
- Crown Steward and Bailiff of the Manor of Northstead

The stewardships are unpaid positions that provide no benefits and carry no responsibilities. The Chiltern Hundreds last required an actual Steward in the 16th century. The main property of the Manor of Northstead was described in 1600 as "unfit for habitation" after "it fell down". The stewardships have been maintained as nominal offices of profit solely as a legal fiction to meet the requirements of the House of Commons Disqualification Act 1975 and its predecessors.

The offices are used alternately, making it possible for two members to resign at the same time. When more than two MPs resign at a time—for example, when 15 Ulster Unionist MPs resigned in protest at the Anglo-Irish Agreement on 17 December 1985—the resignations are, in theory, not simultaneous but spread throughout the day, enabling each member to hold one of the offices for a short time. The former office-holder may subsequently be reelected to Parliament.

== History ==
=== Origins ===
Resignation from the House of Commons has never been allowed in theory, although five MPs were allowed to resign in the early 17th century on grounds of ill health. On 2 March 1624 N.S., Parliament formalized the prohibition by passing a resolution "that a man, after he is duly chosen, cannot relinquish". At the time, serving in Parliament was considered an obligation to be borne rather than a position of power and honour. Members had to travel to Westminster over a primitive road system, a real problem for those who represented more distant constituencies. An MP could not effectively tend to personal business at home while he was away at Parliament, yet MPs were unpaid until 1911.

Originally, the disqualification of office holders from Parliament came about as part of the long struggle to ensure that Parliament would remain free from undue influence on the part of the monarch. Since anyone receiving a salary from the Crown could not be truly independent, the House of Commons passed a resolution on 30 December 1680 stating that an MP who "shall accept any Office, or Place of Profit, from the Crown, without the Leave of this House ... shall be expelled [from] this House." The prohibition was strengthened over the following decades to bar MPs from simultaneously holding certain offices. However, MPs were able to hold crown stewardships until 1740, when Sir Watkin Williams-Wynn became Steward of the Lordship and Manor of Bromfield and Yale and was deemed to have vacated his Commons seat. The Irish House of Commons largely followed the procedure of the English Commons; however, whereas in England the prohibition on MPs holding offices under the crown continued to rest on resolutions, the Parliament of Ireland passed an act in 1793 to enforce it.

=== Development of procedure ===
After the precedent set in 1740, it became possible for MPs to step down by being appointed to a crown stewardship. The procedure was invented by John Pitt, who wanted to vacate his seat for Wareham in order to stand for Dorchester, as he could not be a candidate while he was still an MP. Moreover, it quickly became apparent that if ministers of the Crown were to be meaningfully responsible to Parliament, they needed to be able to sit in the House of Commons. For this reason, someone appointed to an office of profit was only disqualified from continuing to sit in the House of Commons; it was possible for someone already in office to be (re-)elected to Parliament without relinquishing the office.

Pitt wrote to Prime Minister Henry Pelham in May 1750, reporting he had been invited to stand in Dorchester, and asking for "a new mark of his Majesty's favour [to] enable me to do him these further services". Pelham wrote to William Pitt (the elder) indicating that he would intervene with King George II to help. On 17 January 1751, Pitt was appointed to the office of Steward of the Chiltern Hundreds, and was then elected unopposed for Dorchester. The Manor of Northstead was first used for resignation on 6 April 1842 by Patrick Chalmers, Member for the Montrose District of Burghs.

The Chancellor may in theory deny an application. The last time this happened was in 1842, to Viscount Chelsea, who had arranged to resign his Reading seat and campaign for Thomas Mills, in return for Mills' dropping an election petition alleging bribery at the 1841 election. The Chancellor, Henry Goulburn, said that to grant Chelsea's request would be to condone electoral malpractice. In the debate over expelling the fugitive James Sadleir in 1856, the Government committed to refusing any potential application he would make. After Edwin James was appointed to the Chiltern Hundreds upon fleeing to the United States with a £10,000 debt in the 1860s, the letter of appointment was revised to omit the customary mention of the position as one of honour. When Charles Bradlaugh took the Chiltern Hundreds in 1884 to seek a vote of confidence from his constituents, Lord Randolph Churchill and the Conservative press were highly critical of the Gladstone government for allowing Bradlaugh a new opportunity to demonstrate his popularity with the electors of Northampton.

Sections 24 and 25 of the Succession to the Crown Act 1707 listed ministerial offices as offices of profit. When an MP became a government minister, including Prime Minister, they also lost their seat in the House of Commons. Therefore, Ministers were required to regain their seats in Parliament by winning a ministerial by-election. The Re-election of Ministers Act 1919 made it unnecessary to be re-elected within nine months of a general election, and the Act was amended in 1926 to abolish ministerial by-elections entirely.

=== Sinn Féin resignations ===
On 20 January 2011, Sinn Féin MP Gerry Adams submitted a letter of resignation to the Speaker, but did not apply for a Crown office, which would be politically unacceptable for a Sinn Féin politician. On 26 January, a Treasury spokesperson said "Consistent with long-standing precedent, the Chancellor has taken [the letter] as a request to be appointed the Steward and Bailiff of the Manor of Northstead and granted the office." Although David Cameron said during Prime Minister's Questions that Adams had "accepted an office for profit under the Crown", Adams denied this; he continued to simply reject the title, albeit not its effect of removal from office.

Another Sinn Féin MP, Martin McGuinness, resigned and was formally appointed as Steward and Bailiff of the Manor of Northstead on 2 January 2013, leading to the 2013 Mid Ulster by-election. McGuinness also said that he rejected the title.

== Present status ==
=== Law ===
The law relating to resignation is now codified and consolidated in section 4 of the House of Commons Disqualification Act 1975:

For the purposes of the provisions of this Act relating to the vacation of the seat of a member of the House of Commons who becomes disqualified by this Act for membership of that House, the office of steward or bailiff of Her Majesty's three Chiltern Hundreds of Stoke, Desborough and Burnham, or of the Manor of Northstead, shall be treated as included among the offices described in Part III of Schedule 1 to this Act.

Schedule 1 lists actual offices that are disqualifying for membership in the House of Commons. Under Section 6, anyone appointed to those offices is prohibited from being elected to the House or continuing to sit in the House. However, the Stewardships of the Chiltern Hundreds and the Manor of Northstead are only included in Schedule 1 for the purpose of vacating the seat. Stewards can still be elected to the House of Commons after taking up their appointments.

=== Notice and orders ===
An MP applies for the office to the Chancellor of the Exchequer, who usually then signs a warrant appointing the MP to the Crown office. The appointee holds the office until such time as another MP is appointed, or they apply to be released. Sometimes this can be a matter of minutes, as on an occasion when three or more MPs apply on the same day. Once released, they are again free to seek election to the House of Commons.

When an MP is appointed to the post, the Treasury releases a public notice: "The Chancellor of the Exchequer has this day appointed [named individual] to be Steward and Bailiff of the (Three Hundreds of Chiltern / Manor of Northstead)."

After the Speaker has been notified, the appointment and resulting disqualification is noted in the Vote and Proceedings, the Commons' daily journal of proceedings:

Notification, laid upon the Table by the Speaker, That Mr Chancellor of the Exchequer had today appointed [named individual], Member for [named constituency], to be (Steward and Bailiff of the Three Hundreds of Chiltern / Steward and Bailiff of His Majesty’s Manor of Northstead).

Thereafter, the former MP's party (or the Government, if they were independent, their party has no other MPs or the party is abstentionist) moves for a writ of election to be issued calling for a by-election. The resulting order is in the following form:

Ordered, That the Speaker do issue his Warrant for the Clerk of the Crown to make out a new writ for the electing of a Member to serve in this present parliament for the [County Constituency] of [named area] in the room of the [Right Honourable] [named individual], who since election for the said [County Constituency] has been appointed to the (Office of Steward and Bailiff of His Majesty's Three Chiltern Hundreds of Stoke, Desborough and Burnham in the County of Buckingham/Office of Steward and Bailiff of His Majesty's Manor of Northstead in the County of York).

The wording of these announcements may vary.

== Former offices ==
Other offices formerly used for the same purpose are:

- Steward and Bailiff of the Manor of East Hendred, Berkshire. This stewardship was first used for parliamentary purposes in November 1763 by Edward Southwell, and was in more or less constant use until 1840, after which it disappeared. This manor comprised copyholds, the usual courts were held, and the stewardship was an actual and active office. The manor was sold by public auction in 1823, but in some manner the Crown retained the right of appointing a steward for seventeen years afterwards.
- Steward of the Manor of Hempholme, Yorkshire. This manor appears to have been of the same nature as that of Northstead. It was in lease until 1835. It was first used for parliamentary purposes in 1845 and was in constant use until 1865. It was sold in 1866.
- Escheator of Munster. Escheators were officers commissioned to secure the rights of the Crown over property which had legally escheated (forfeited) to it from those who had held land from the crown and had recently died (or been legally attainted). In Ireland mention is made of escheators as early as 1256. In 1605 the escheatorship of Ireland was split into four, one for each province, but the duties soon became practically nominal. The escheatorship of Munster was first used for parliamentary purposes in the Irish Parliament from 1793 to 1800, and in the united Parliament (24 times for Irish seats and once for a Scottish seat) from 1801 to 1820. After 1820 it was discontinued and finally abolished in 1838.
- Steward of the Manor of Old Shoreham, Sussex. This manor belonged to the Duchy of Cornwall. It was first used for parliamentary purposes in 1756, and then, occasionally, until 1799, in which year it was sold by the Duchy to the Duke of Norfolk.
- Steward of the Manor of Poynings, Sussex. This manor reverted to the Crown on the death of Lord Montague about 1804, but was leased until about 1835. It was only twice used for parliamentary purposes, in 1841 and 1843.
- Escheator of Ulster. This appointment was used in the united Parliament three times, for Irish seats only; the last time in 1819.
  - February 1801: William Talbot (Kilkenny City)
  - March 1804: John Claudius Beresford (Dublin City)
  - February 1819: Richard Nevill (Wexford)
- Steward of the Honour of Otford, Kent. Used once in 1742 for Lord Middlesex (East Grinstead).
- Chief Steward and Keeper of the Courts of the Honour of Berkhamsted, Hertfordshire, Buckinghamshire, and Northampton (part of the Duchy of Cornwall). Used once in 1752 for Henry Lascelles (Northallerton).
- Steward of the Manor of Kennington, Surrey. Used once in 1757 for Thomas Duckett (Calne).
- Steward of the Manor of Shippon, Berkshire. Used once in 1765 for Thomas Watson (Berwick-upon-Tweed).
- A different kind of appointment, the militia agency, has also been used. For example, in 1770 Jervoise Clarke Jervoise was appointed to the office of agent to the regiment of militia of the county of Sussex, as a consequence of him not being able to be appointed to the customary stewardships at that time. Similar offices were used on at least two more occasions.

== See also ==
- List of United Kingdom by-elections (2010–present)
- List of stewards of the Chiltern Hundreds (1751–present)
- List of stewards of the Manor of East Hendred (1763–1840)
- List of stewards of the Manor of Hempholme (1845–1865)
- List of stewards of the Manor of Northstead (1844–present)
- List of stewards of the Manor of Old Shoreham (1756–1799)
- List of stewards of the Manor of Poynings (1841–1843)
- List of Escheators of Connaught and list of Escheators of Leinster (used for resignation from the Irish House of Commons)
- House of Lords

== Sources ==
- Hicks, Edward (11 September 2019). "Resignation from the House of Commons" (PDF). Briefing Papers (06395). House of Commons Library.
