= Will O'Brien =

Will O'Brien may refer to:

- Will O'Brien, a character in the 2003–2005 TV series Mile High
- Will O'Brien, one of the founders of the American fintech company BitGo in 2011
- Will O'Brien, one of the interviewees in the 2014 documentary Print the Legend
- Will O'Brien, an Australian football player in the 2025 Port Adelaide Football Club season
- Will O'Brien, a character in "A More Perfect Union", a 2016 episode of the TV series Person of Interest

== See also ==
- William O'Brien (disambiguation)
