= List of Escheators of Connaught =

This is a list of the Members of Parliament appointed as Escheator of Connaught, a notional 'office of profit under the crown' which was used to resign from the Irish House of Commons.

The escheator was originally responsible for the administration of escheat /ɪsˈtʃiːt/, a common law doctrine that transfers the real property of a person who has died without heirs to the crown or state.

The office was formerly substantive. It was founded in 1605, when the escheatorship for Ireland was divided among the provinces of Connaught, Leinster, Munster, and Ulster.

== Members of the Irish House of Commons ==
- 1693: Robert Saunders (Cavan)
- 1742: St John Bowden (substantive officer)
- 1799: Hon. Charles Knox (Dungannon)

In 1838, all of the Irish escheatorships were abolished by the Lord Lieutenant of Ireland.

== See also ==
- Escheator
- Resignation from the British House of Commons
