= William O'Brien =

William O'Brien may refer to:

== Politicians ==
- William O'Brien (Irish nationalist politician) (1852–1928), Irish journalist and politician
- William O'Brien, 2nd Earl of Inchiquin (c. 1640–1692), Governor of Jamaica
- William O'Brien (Australian politician) (1882–1953), New South Wales politician
- William O'Brien (Fine Gael politician) (1918–1994), Irish Fine Gael TD and Senator from County Limerick
- William O'Brien (Minnesota politician) (1930–2007), American politician
- William O'Brien (Nova Scotia politician) (1782–1854), political figure in Nova Scotia
- William O'Brien (Rhode Island politician) (born 1969), American state legislator in Rhode Island
- William O'Brien (trade unionist) (1881–1968), Irish Labour TD and trade union leader
- William Edward O'Brien (1831–1914), lawyer, farmer, editor and political figure in Ontario, Canada
- William H. O'Brien (1871–?), Wisconsin state assemblyman
- William J. O'Brien (politician) (1836–1905), United States Representative from Maryland, 1873–1877
- William L. O'Brien (born 1951), former Speaker of the New Hampshire House of Representatives
- William Smith O'Brien (1803–1864), Irish Conservative and Repeal MP and Young Ireland revolutionary
- William Smith O'Brien (American politician) (1862–1948), U.S. Representative from West Virginia
- Bill O'Brien (British politician) (1929–2025), British Labour MP for Normanton, 1983–2005
- Billy O'Brien (politician) (1929–2012), American politician in the Virginia House of Delegates

== In sports ==
- William O'Brien (American football) (1923–2000), head football coach for the Southern Illinois Salukis
- William O'Brien (footballer), Scottish footballer
- William O'Brien (racing driver) (born 1959), American racing driver
- Parry O'Brien (William Patrick O'Brien, 1932–2007), American shot-put innovator
- William O'Brien, National League baseball umpire in 1876
- Willie O'Brien (1929–2015), English footballer
- Bill O'Brien (American football, born 1924) (1924–2005), American football halfback
- Bill O'Brien (American football) (born 1969), American football coach
- Bill O'Brien (footballer, born 1877) (1877–1942), Australian rules footballer for Collingwood
- Bill O'Brien (footballer, born 1887) (1887–1943), Australian rules footballer for St Kilda
- Bill O'Brien (footballer, born 1905) (1905–1988), Australian rules footballer for South Melbourne
- Billy O'Brien (baseball) (1860–1911), Major League Baseball first baseman
- Billy O'Brien (footballer) (born 1995), Welsh football goalkeeper

== Other people ==
- William O'Brien, 2nd Marquess of Thomond (1765–1846), Irish peer
- William O'Brien, 3rd Earl of Inchiquin (1662–1719), Irish peer
- William O'Brien, 4th Earl of Inchiquin (1700–1777), founder of the Royal Cork Yacht Club in 1720
- William O'Brien (actor) (1740–1815), Irish actor in the company of David Garrick at Drury Lane
- William O'Brien (judge) (1832–1899), Irish judge
- William O'Brien (police officer) (1944–2016), American police officer
- William O'Brien (Royal Navy officer) (1916–2016), British admiral
- William O'Brien, President, BATS Global Markets
- William B. O'Brien, founder and the president of the World Federation of Therapeutic Communities also co-founder of Daytop
- William David O'Brien (1878–1962), auxiliary bishop of Chicago, Illinois, USA
- William J. O'Brien (Medal of Honor) (1899–1944), United States Army officer during World War II
- William J. O'Brien, inventor of the Decca Navigator System
- William P. O'Brien (police commissioner) (1891–1960), American police officer
- William S. O'Brien (1825–1878), American businessman
- Bill O'Brien (actor), Director of Theatre and Musical Theatre for the National Endowment for the Arts; actor
- Tim O'Brien (author) (William Timothy O'Brien, born 1946), American author
- Billy Porter (criminal) (William O'Brien, 1850–?), American burglar and underworld figure in New York City
- William O'Brien (archaeologist), Irish professor of archaeology in University College Cork.
- Billy O'Brien, film director whose work includes I Am Not a Serial Killer (film) (2016)
- Billy O'Brien, child actor who appeared in films including The Lone Trail (1932)

== Other uses ==
- SS William O'Brien, steam cargo ship built in 1914–1915 by New York Shipbuilding Company of Camden, foundered in April 1920

== See also ==
- Will O'Brien (disambiguation)
- William O'Bryan (1778–1868), English preacher
