= Office of profit =

Post providing financial gain to the holder

An office of profit means a position that brings to the person holding it some financial gain, or advantage, or benefit. It may be an office or place of profit if it carries some remuneration, financial advantage, benefit etc.

It is a term used in a number of national constitutions to refer to executive appointments. A number of countries forbid members of the legislature from accepting an office of profit under the executive as a means to secure the independence of the legislature and preserve the separation of powers.

== Origin ==
The English Act of Settlement 1701 and Act of Union 1707 are an early example of this principle. The Act of Settlement provided that

no person who has an office or place of profit under the King, or receives a pension from the Crown, shall be capable of serving as a member of the House of Commons;

== Australia ==
Section 44(iv) of the Constitution of Australia provides that anyone who holds an "office of profit under the Crown" is disqualified from sitting in or being elected to Federal Parliament. This provision has been subject to interpretation by the High Court of Australia, sitting as the Court of Disputed Returns. In 2018, the Court of Disputed Returns introduced a two-limbed test to determine whether an office was "under the Crown":

- An office is "under the Crown" if appointment is made "at the will of the executive government of the Commonwealth or of a State", even if the government does not control the office-holder's tenure or remuneration
- If appointment is not made "at the will" of the government, an office is still "under the Crown" if the government exercises "effective control over holding or profiting from the office"

== India ==
=== Law ===
The term is used in Article 58 (2), 66 (4), 102 (1)(a) and 191 (1) of the Indian Constitution which bars a member of the Indian Parliament from holding an office that would give its occupant the opportunity to gain a financial advantage or benefit. It refers to a post under central/state government which yields salaries, perks and other benefits. The actual amount of profit gained during the violation has no bearing on its classification. India had the Parliament (Prevention of Disqualification) Act, 1950, 1951, and 1953 exempting certain posts from being recorded as offices of profit. All these Acts were replaced by the Parliament (Prevention of Disqualification) Act, 1959. By virtue of section 3 of the said Act, certain offices did not disqualify their holders from being members of Parliament. A person is disqualified from Lok Sabha if he or she holds an office of profit except some 56 officers now would not be regarded as the offices of profit for this purpose. The law was again amended in 2006.

The representatives cannot hold an office of profit under section 9 of the Representation of the People Act, 1951 and Article 191 (1)(a) of the Constitution also.

== United Kingdom ==
In the United Kingdom, the principle has been eroded. The executive sits in the legislature, and from the nineteenth century ministries were invariably led by members of parliament (MPs, in the House of Commons) or peers (members of the House of Lords).

Until 1919, MPs who were appointed to ministerial office lost their right to sit in the House of Commons and had to seek re-election in a ministerial by-election.

The rule survives in the House of Commons Disqualification Act 1975 which specifies a number of state positions that make an individual ineligible to serve as a Member of Parliament.

The last vestige of the rule can be seen through the process of resignation from the House of Commons. By virtue of a resolution of the House of Commons of 1624, no MP can resign his or her seat. An MP who wishes to resign has first to accept an office of profit under the Crown, thus vacating their seat. Members who wish to retire ask to be appointed to the office of Crown Steward and Bailiff of the Chiltern Hundreds, or Crown Steward and Bailiff of the Manor of Northstead.

While these ancient posts have no responsibilities attached to them, they fulfill the requirements of the law (since 1975, by being named explicitly as disqualifying) and disqualify members from sitting in Parliament, enabling their retirement.

== United States ==
The U.S. Constitution prohibits a Member of Congress from being appointed to an executive office under two circumstances: if the executive office was created during that Member's term in Congress, or if the compensation for that executive office was increased during that Member's term in Congress (but see the Saxbe fix). The U.S. Constitution also prohibits an executive officer from being a Member of Congress. Specifically, Article I, Section 6, Clause 2 provides:

No Senator or Representative shall, during the Time for which he was elected, be appointed to any civil Office under the Authority of the United States, which shall have been created, or the Emoluments whereof shall have been encreased during such time; and no Person holding any Office under the United States, shall be a Member of either House during his Continuance in Office.

The U.S. Constitution does not define the term "office of profit." In fact, that term is not even used in the above-mentioned provision. However, the term "office of profit" is referred to in three other provisions.

First, a person who is convicted upon impeachment faces two restrictions: 1) Removal from office; and 2) Disqualification to hold an office honor, trust or profit. Specifically, Article I, section 3, clause 7 provides:

Judgment in Cases of Impeachment shall not extend further than to removal from Office, and disqualification to hold and enjoy any Office of honor, Trust or Profit under the United States: but the Party convicted shall nevertheless be liable and subject to Indictment, Trial, Judgment and Punishment, according to Law.

Second, a person holding an office of trust, or an office of profit, may receive presents, emoluments, offices, or titles from foreign powers with the consent of Congress. Specifically, Article I, section 9, clause 8 provides:

No Title of Nobility shall be granted by the United States: And no Person holding any Office of Profit or Trust under them, shall, without the Consent of the Congress, accept of any present, Emolument, Office, or Title, of any kind whatever, from any King, Prince or foreign State.

Third, a person holding an office of trust, or an office of profit, is prohibited from serving as a presidential elector. Specifically, Article II, section 1, clause 2 provides:

Each State shall appoint, in such Manner as the Legislature thereof may direct, a Number of Electors, equal to the whole Number of Senators and Representatives to which the State may be entitled in the Congress: but no Senator or Representative, or Person holding an Office of Trust or Profit under the United States, shall be appointed an Elector.

== Bibliography ==
- Achary, P.D.T. (2006). Law & Practice Relating to Office of Profit. Bharat Law House. ISBN 978-81-7737-114-7. This treatment by a Secretary General of the Lok Sabha covers the concept in the Indian and British contexts.
