= Mirza Abu Taleb Khan =

Indian traveller of iranian ethnicity

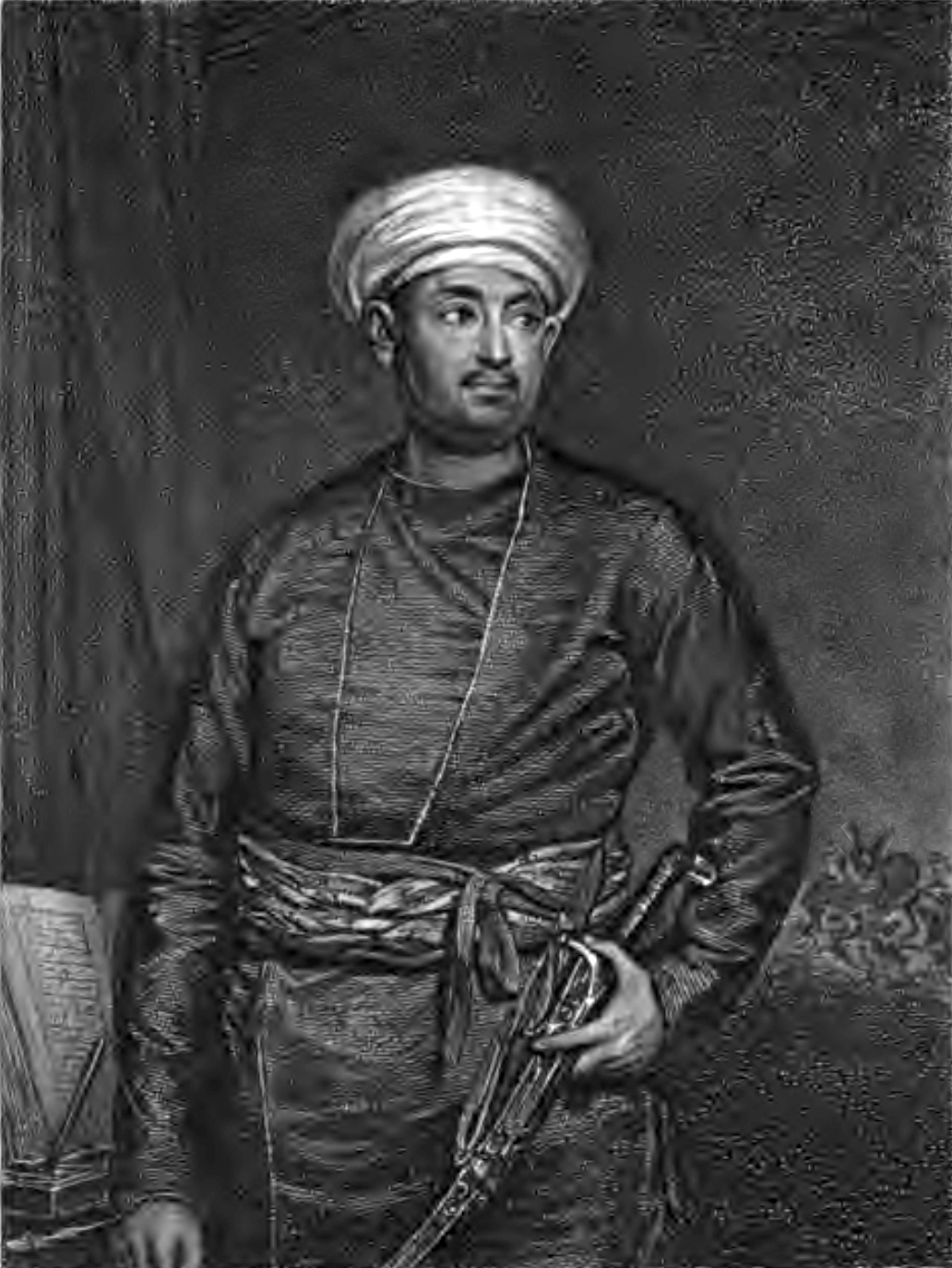
Engraving of Mirza Abu Taleb Khan, based on a portrait by James Northcote

Mirza Abu Taleb Khan (Persian: میرزا ابوطالب خان; more formally Mirzá Abú Muhammad Tabrízí Isfahání, میرزا ابومحمد تبریزی اصفهانی, known as The Persian Prince during his stay in London and as Abú Tálib Londoni once back in India (Note: In Persian naming, Mirza is either an honorific to identify patriarchal lineage to royal aristocracies, or alternatively an honorific denoting a secretary. Khan is, or is derived from, a title for an honoured person, albeit one increasingly incorporated as a family name. It is probable, per his formal name, that our subject's given names are Abú Muhammad, family name Tabrízí or Taleb of the Isfahání region, identified as a Mirza and a Khan. Hajy as part of his father's name indicates that Mohammed Beg Khan has made the Muslim pilgrimage to Mecca. In this article, Abu Taleb is used as a shortened name for the subject. More minor variations such as Taleb and Talib reflect different styles of transliteration of Persian into English.) 1752–1805/1806) (Note: Two different dates and two different places of death are found in the sources. Willasey-Wilsey specifies 1805. Elliot and Dowson specify 1805 and Lucknow. Both Sen and Haq specify 1806; The New American Cyclopaedia specifies 1806 and Calcutta .) was an Indian tax-collector and administrator of Iranian stock, notable for a memoir of his travels in Britain, Europe and Asia Minor, Masir Talib fi Bilad Afranji, written between circa 1799 and 1805.

The book's title is translated as The Travels of Taleb in the Regions of Europe and was reprinted in the West as Travels of Mirza Abu Taleb Khan in Asia, Africa and Europe; it is one of the earliest by an Indian travel writer about the West, and has been described as 'perhaps the most significant "reverse travelogue" published in Europe during the Romantic era". He wrote all his works in Persian.

== Biography ==
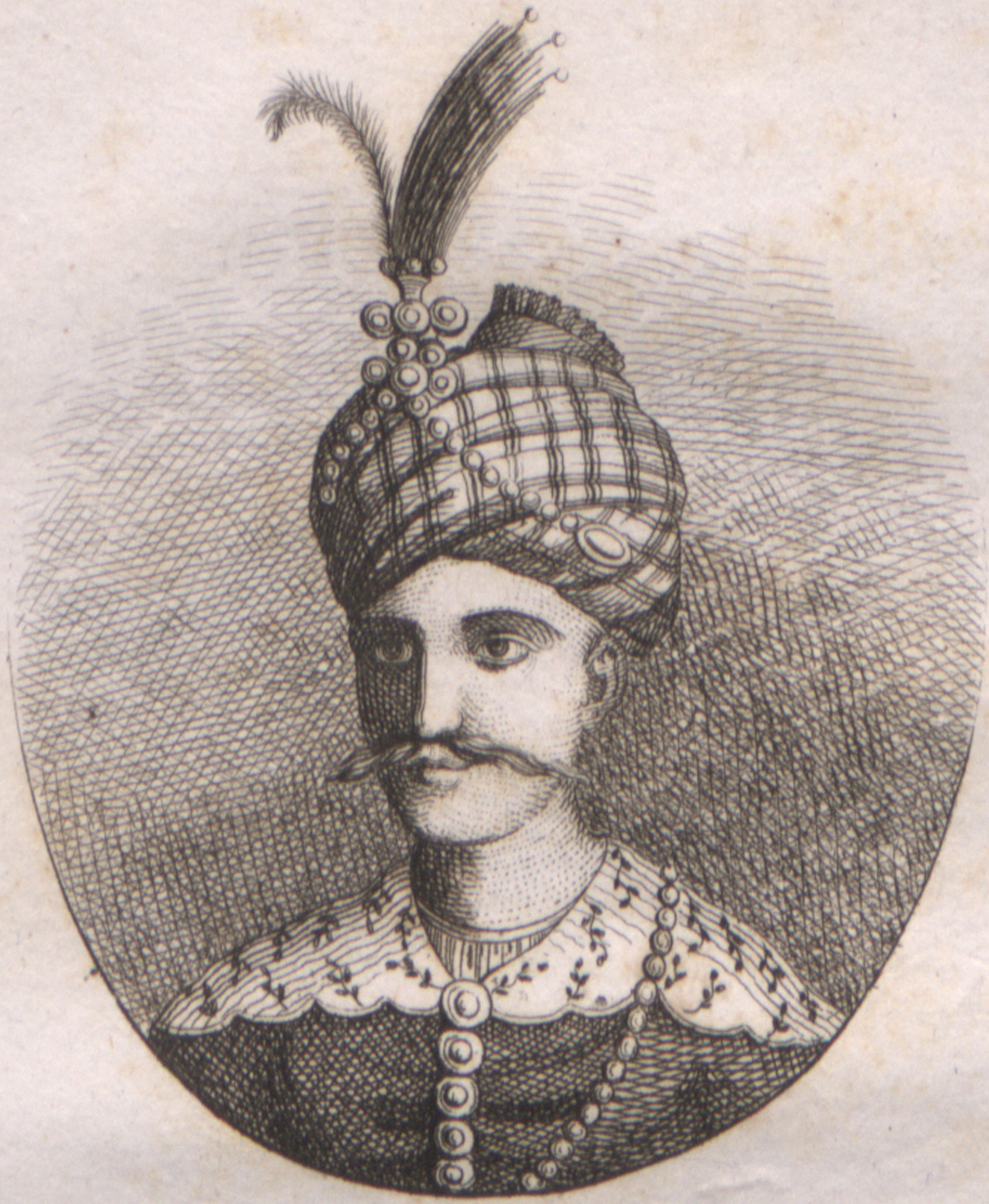
Portrait of Mirza Abu Taleb Khan

=== Oudh and Bengal ===
Much of what is known of Abu Taleb's background comes from his memoirs. By his description, his Iranian father Hajji Mohammed Beg (died 1768) was born in Abbasabad in the Isfahan Province of Persia, but fled to Lucknow in Oudh State, northern India, in fear of the 'tyranny' of Nader Shah. There he was 'admitted to the friendship' of Safdarjung, the Subadar Nawab of Oudh and was in time appointed assistant to the deputy-governor of Oudh, Safdarjung's nephew Mohammed Culy Khan. His appointment did not survive Safdarjung's death in 1754; the new Nawab, Safdarjung's son Shuja-ud-Daula had Mohammed Culy Khan executed and Hajy Mohammed Beg Khan fled to Murshidabad, West Bengal within a couple of years of Abu Taleb's birth in Lucknow in 1752.

Abu Taleb and his mother remained in Lucknow under the protection of the Nawab - "although Nabob Shujaa ad Dowleh was much displeased at my father's conduct, he nevertheless, recollecting the connexion between our families, supplied my mother with money for her expenses and have her strict injunctions to let me have the very best education." They moved to Murshidabad in 1766, but in 1768, within about 18 months of their arrival, Hajy Mohammed Beg Khan died. Abu Taleb had been married into the family of 'Muzaffer Jung - Nabob of Bengal' and spent some time in that prince's service, remaining away from Oudh until, in 1775, after the death of Shuja-ud-Daula and the accession of his son Asaf-ud-Daula, he was invited by the prime minister, Mokhtiar-ud-Daula, to take up the position of Aumildar of the Etawah district. The role combined tax-collector, Lord-Lieutenant and local military controller, but ceased within a couple of years upon the death of Abu Taleb's patron Mokhtiar, and the appointment of Hyder Beg Khan as his replacement.

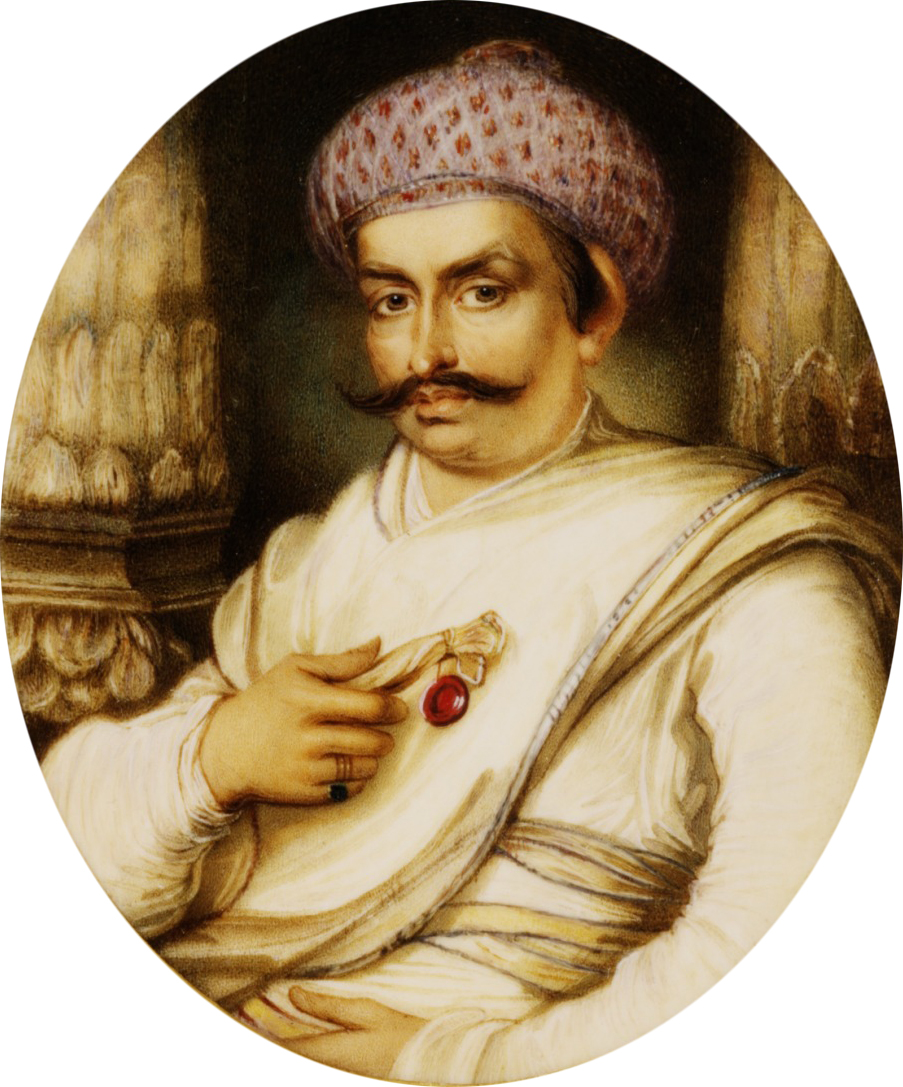
Hyder Beg Khan, Asaf-ud-Daula's minister and Abu Taleb's foe

Abu Taleb spent a year in Lucknow, after which he took up a first appointment with the East India Company - already well involved in Oudh affairs - to assist Colonel Alexander Hanney, the company's tax-collector at Gorakhpur; this he did for three years until Hanney returned to Europe, whereupon Abu Taleb retired again to a year of unemployment in Lucknow. Relations between the Company and Oudh were in this period strained, including during the 1781–1782 third period of Nathaniel Middleton office as Resident, and, according to Abu Taleb, the State's tax-collection system was in sufficient disarray that Zamindars, notably Balbhadra Singh, were refusing to make any payments (all Hyder Beg Khan's fault, according to Abu Taleb.) A military action by the Nawab and the Company against Singh failed (again, Hyder Beg Khan's fault!) and, Abu Taleb says, Warren Hastings, the then Governor General, instructed Middleton to send for Abu Taleb as a person who might be able to bring Singh under control. After briefly playing hard-to-get, Mizra agreed to assist and from circa 1782-1784 Abu Taleb campaigned against, defeated and killed Singh. Middleton had been withdrawn from Lucknow, and Hastings resigned in 1784, leaving Abu Taleb somewhat exposed, but surviving on an allowance from the Nawab of 6,000 rupees per annum; his bête noire Hyder Beg Khan was still in place and appeared to have the confidence of the new Governor General, Sir John Macpherson.

By 1787, Hyder Beg Khan had stopped Abu Taleb's allowance, which precipitated a decision on Abu Taleb's part to leave Lucknow for Calcutta, the seat of East India Company government. Initial overtures to Sir Charles Cornwallis, who succeeded Macpherson as Governor General, were poorly timed; Cornwallis's attention was focussed on Tipu Sultan and the Third Anglo-Mysore War, and it was only at the 1792 conclusion of that engagement that Cornwallis responded, sending Abu Taleb back to Lucknow with letters of recommendation to Asaf-ud-Daula and George Frederick Cherry, the Resident. Abu Taleb's expectation of a resumption of employment was dashed by disagreements between the Nawab and the Resident severe enough to necessitate the withdrawal of the latter from Lucknow; in 1795 Abu Taleb again found it expedient to remove to Calcutta. Although John Shore made encouraging noises, several years of deteriorating Company relations with Oudh, the 1797 death of Asaf-ud-Daula, the brief reign of Wazir Ali Khan with its delayed culmination in the Massacre of Benares all served to render Abu Taleb unemployed, separated from his family, increasingly poor and depressed.

=== Khan's travels ===
It was at this very low period in Abu Taleb's life that, in 1799, an unexpected offer was made to him by David Thomas Richardson, an East India Company officer returning to London for health reasons. Richardson suggested that Abu Taleb accompany him and undertake a grand-tour of Europe; Abu Taleb promptly accepted. It is unclear whether Richardson's offer arose from personal friendship, or if the hand of the East India Company was involved. Tim Willasey-Wilsey suggests that the company was making an investment in Abu Taleb with a view to his potential later utility in Oudh. This reading of the situation may rest in some small part on Charles Stewart's English language translation of Abu Taleb's Persian language travel memoir, which sees Richardson offering to pay Abu Taleb's expenses. That translation is disputed by Gita Hashemi, who translates the key passage in the book as Abu Taleb agreeing to Richardson's suggestion, but booking and paying for his own passage. Equally, it is clear that Abu Taleb was involved in the political intrigues of Oudh, and both were regarded whilst en route as having confidential motives for their travel; and the unprecedented nature of the trip is itself grounds for reasonable suspicion in the context of the company's anticipation of annexation of Oudh State.

Khan and Richardson departed Calcutta on 7 February 1799, making it as far as Cape Town in South Africa where, in despair about conditions on their ship, they remained for some months awaiting the opportunity of a more congenial conveyance; they were well-received, and came within the social circle of Lady Anne Barnard. The pair left Cape Town in late September to arrive in Cork, Ireland in December 1799. Finding that Cornwallis was now Lord Lieutenant and Commander-in-Chief in Ireland, the pair travelled overland to Dublin, where Abu Taleb visited and presumably made representations to Cornwallis. It is clear that work in the early 1770s with Nathaniel Middleton had damaged Abu Taleb's standing in Oudh, where he was depicted by rivals as supporting British interests at the cost of those of the Nawab; and it is most likely that Abu Taleb sought recompense from the company. Whilst in Dublin he also met Sake Dean Mahomed, a Bengali living in Ireland who had in 1794 published The Travels of Dean Mahomet, which perhaps served as a model for Abu Taleb's work.

Supplied by Cornwallis with letters of recommendation, Abu Taleb now proceeded to London, arriving on 21 January 1800, where he remained and was to a large degree lionised by London society as The Persian Prince. He was presented to Charlotte of Mecklenburg-Strelitz, George III's queen who is said to have commanded him "frequently to court", and became a sought-after social celebrity dubbed 'The Persian Prince', whose movements and meetings were reported by newspapers. He was received by and met with the great and good, such as James Christie, John Debrett and Josiah Wedgwood; and of perhaps more moment met with key political figures such as Henry Dundas, then Secretary of State for War, and directors of the East India Company. As notably, Abu Taleb delighted in meeting with the wives and daughters of his contacts.

Abu Taleb departed England on 7 June 1802, visiting France, where he met with Antoine Isaac Silvestre de Sacy and Louis-Mathieu Langlès, both orientalists, and received invitations, frustrated by illness, to visit Talleyrand and Napoleon. He proceeded to Constantinople, meeting with Selim III, the Sultan and from there overland though Kurdistan and Persia, visiting the Shia shrines of Karbala and Najaf, before returning to Calcutta in August 1803. Willasey-Wilsey suggests that this leg of his journey was designed to burnish his Muslim credentials, as part of the joint Khan and Company plans for his future.

Abu Taleb found himself employment upon his return as an administrator in Bundelkhand, and devoted his time to writing an account of his travels, which he circulated in very limited numbers as Masir Talib fi Bilad Afranji, before his untimely death in 1805 or 1806.

== Travels of Mirza Abu Taleb Khan ==
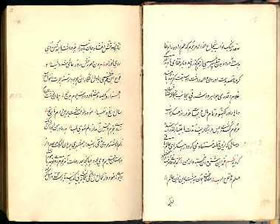
Scan of the Persian language Masir Talib fi Bilad Afranji by Mirza Abu Taleb Khan

The Persian title of the book is a play on words, employing talib - one who wishes - to contrast with Taleb and connote "Taleb/Talib’s trajectory", or "the path of wishfulness" or "the path of aspiration", and which encompasses the book's dual functions as travel guide and as a discussion of the spiritual purpose of travelling.

Taleb sets out his purpose in writing the book in its preface: to describe, for the benefit of his countrymen, the 'curiosities and wonders he saw', noting that many of the 'customs, inventions, sciences and ordinances of Europe' might be used to good effect in Asia. To this end, the book both chronicles his travels, but also provides discrete chapters on subject-matter of interest to him, including "the arts and sciences, mechanical inventions, the lifestyles of the different classes, the system of government, the East India Company, the judiciary, the financial system, the defects of character and the virtues of the English ..on Europe [and] England's conflict with France, and ... on England's overseas conquests."

Amrit Sen has discussed issues of autoethnography arising in Khan's work, noting the tension between his admiration for, and criticism of, the west; and his use of the coloniser's language both to identify with Europeans but also critique them; this leading to ambiguity about Khan's "oriental" persona. He is fascinated by western engineering, factories, bridges and shipyards, and understands the link between Europe's prosperity and its industrial revolution. He praises the industry and efficiency of English people, and their honour and relative learning. Equally, he critiques the English lack of faith and a range of deplorable characteristics, such as their pride, insolence, and excessive fondness for luxury. Sen asserts that it is possible to read Abu Taleb's book as a series of comparisons praising the virtues of the east above the west: "the Muslims of Cape Town are kind and superior; the savages of Andaman are preferable to his European shipmates; Oxford is almost like the ancient Indian temples; the Quazis are superior to the English jury system – which is frightening and often prone to mistakes ... Abu Taleb praises the English 'equality of all' before the law and yet proceeds to suggest that this 'equality is more in appearance than in reality'. He attacks the British legal system as corrupt and convoluted."

Despite such a reading, Abu Taleb's book was noticed by and promulgated by India's English colonisers: Sen notes this as "a fascinating insight into the operation of the colonial machinery" A copy of Abu Taleb's Persian language text found its way to Charles Stewart, who translated it into English and published it in 1810. A second English edition was published in 1814, and its preface recounts - in part by way of seeking to assure readers of the authenticity of the book - that the Bengal Government had caused the Persian language original to be published, 'convinced of the policy of disseminating such a work amongst the Natives of the British Dominions of the East'. Abu Taleb's son, Mirza Hussein Ali, who entered into the company's service at Fort William College, assisted in the publication of the Persian language version, editions of which were published in 1812, 1827 and 1836.

More recent versions include a 1972 reprint by Sona Publications, New Delhi, and a contemporary edition, designed for the academic market, published in 2008 by Broadview Press.

== Works ==
Mirza Abu Taleb Khan's known works include:

- Lubbu-s Siyar wa Jahánnumá (The Essence of Biographies, and the World-Reflecting Mirror ) c. 1793–94
- Masir Talib fi Bilad Afranji, (The Travels of Taleb in the Regions of Europe) c. 1805
- Travels of Mirza Abu Taleb Khan in Asia, Africa and Europe 1810, 1814

Besides these, Elliot and Dowson assert that he was the author of 'several other treatises, a Biography of the Poets, ancient and modern, and', quoting the Zubdatu-l Gharaib of Muhammad Riza, '"himself indulged in versification, especially on the subject of the females of England, who aspire to equality with the Angels of Paradise, and he was always expatiating on the heart-ravishing strains of the women of that country, who used to sing at the public assemblies"'.

== See also ==
- Tafazzul Husain Kashmiri
- Dean Mahomed
