= Greek Vulgate =

Expression used in Christianity

Vulgata editio simply meaning a "common text" of the Bible; the following works have been called the Greek Vulgate over the years, particularly in older scholarship before the 20th century:

- It was the name that Frederick Nolan used for the Textus Receptus in his An Inquiry into the Integrity of the Greek Vulgate, or Received Text of the New Testament published in 1815.
- It was the name that Thomas Shore used for the Septuagint, as did others such as Ado of Vienne and Bellarmin.
- It was the name of any so-called "κοινή έκδοσις" (equivalent to "Vulgata editio") Greek texts, including non-Hexaplaric texts of the Septuagint.
