= Thomas Shore (writer) =

Thomas Shore (1793–1863) was a writer.

== Life ==
Shore was born in 1793 to the Reverend Thomas William Shore and Juliana Mackworth (born Praed) of Otterton in Devon. He was a nephew of John Shore, 1st Baron Teignmouth. He taught Earl Canning and the second Earl Granville. Shore was the author of 'The Churchman and the Freethinker' (1863).

He was the father of three notable writers. The eldest (Margaret) Emily Shore died young and is known for her diary. Emily taught her two younger sisters Louisa Catherine Shore and Arabella Shore. Shore also had at least two other children who were boys.
