= Frederick John Shore =

English East India Company official (1799–1837)

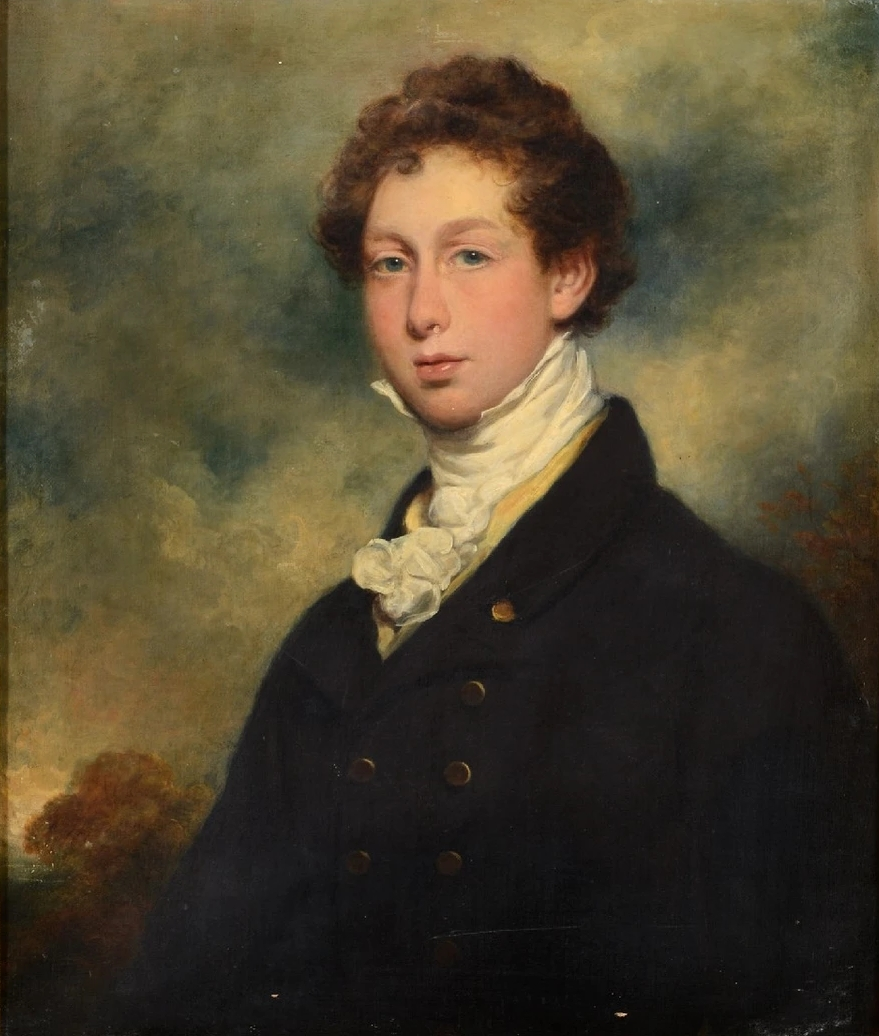
Portrait c. 1820 by Arthur William Devis (1762 - 1822)

Frederick John Shore (31 May 1799 – 29 May 1837) was a civil servant and judge who worked in the East India Company service in India. He was a son of John Shore, 1st Baron Teignmouth (1751–1834). Unusual for the period, Shore was openly critical of East India Company rule in India. He was particularly vocal against the idea of using English as the sole language in India and wrote in defence of local language use. He published under the pen name "A friend to India" in the India Gazette, a Calcutta periodical.

== Biography ==
Shore was born in England, the second son of John Shore, 1st Baron Teignmouth and Charlotte née Cornish (1759-1834). He was baptized at St George Hanover Square, Middlesex on 26 November. He came to India in 1817 as a writer (a junior clerk) and then became an assistant to the secretary of the board of commissioners. He joined the Bengal Civil Service in 1818 and became joint magistrate at Bulandshahr. In 1822 he became superintendent of Dehra Dun, in 1832 Civil & Sessions judge at Fatehgarh, Farrukhabad and from 1836 was Civil Commissioner and Political Agent of the Sagar and Nerbudda Territories. He used his experience on the ground in his administration, overriding the government issued guidance of the Cornwallis code. He married Charlotte Mary Cornish (1800-1883) of Devonshire, daughter of his mother's brother, in 1830 and they had three children. His daughter Louisa Sara Floyer (1830–1909) was involved in introducing knitting and needlework into girls' education at the elementary school level in Lincolnshire.

=== India ===
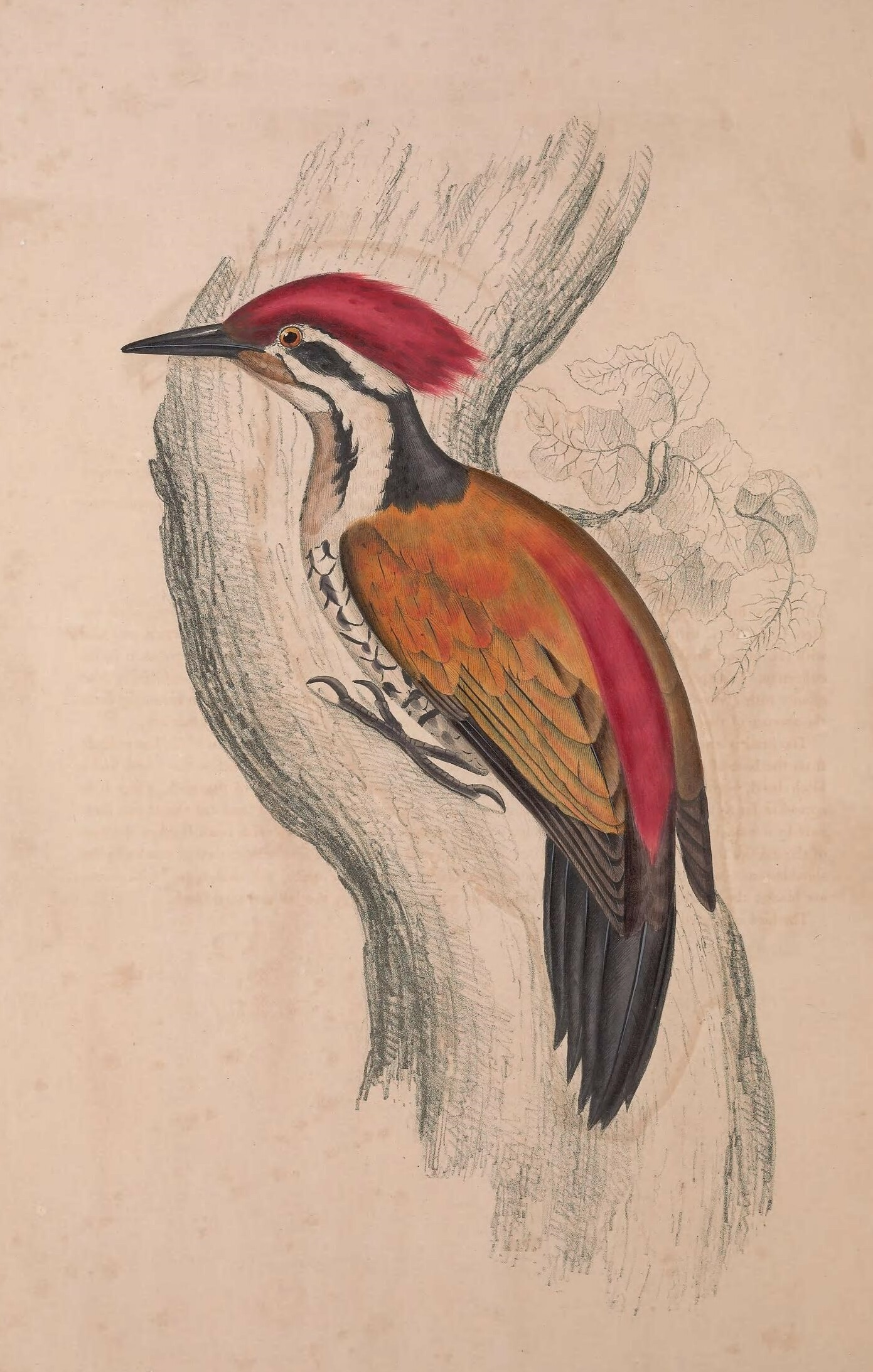
Dinopium shorii, painting by Elizabeth Gould

Shore's first civil service posting was at Fatehgarh in 1820 serving as a junior assistant to the Revenue Board of Commissioners. Most of the work was actually done by Indian munshis and he wrote home that the whole work was a "farce". The farmers protested the level of taxation and revenue targets were not achieved.

Shore wrote anonymous essays in the India Gazette, a Calcutta newspaper, from January 1832 to October 1835. The opinion pieces included a defence of vernacular languages. He saw the government as being bent on replacing local languages with English. These notes were republished in 1837 under the title Notes on Indian Affairs published in two volumes. In it he was outspokenly critical of English administration. He noted the economic condition of the people: "But the halcyon days of India are over; she has been drained of a large proportion of the wealth she once possessed, and her energies have been cramped by a sordid system of misrule to which the interests of millions have been sacrificed for the benefit of the few." .... "The gradual impoverishment of the people and country, under the mode of rule established by the British Government, has hastened their (old merchant princes') fall." He was critical of English ignorance of native languages (one of the chapters was titled "Of the Injustice of Compelling the People of India to Adopt a Foreign Language and Character") and considered the judicial system to be a mockery of justice. He was in favour of having a native nobility manage agricultural lands. Shore wore Indian ("mussalman") clothes to court which led to a government order being issued against his practice.

Shore served as joint-magistrate of Bulandshahr where he was involved in policing and dealing with the local gurjars. In 1822 he was posted Joint Magistrate, succeeding George Stockwell, and Assistant Collector to Dehra Dun. In order to supply drinking water, he had set up a well near the magistrate's office dug 228 feet deep at the cost of Rs 11,000. It was built with great effort and at least two lives were lost in making it. It continues to be called Shore's well. In 1823 he had convict labour build roads around Dehra Dun. At Fatehgarh he had a treadmill to grind corn which was powered by jail labour. The mill house was outside the jail premises but the shaft of the treadmill passed through the wall. This experiment in 1832 which costed Rs 1087 for the government was declared a failure. He had an Indian mistress in Dehra Dun by whom he had a daughter who was christened as Maria in 1825 by chaplain Henry Fisher. He sometimes dressed himself in muslim costume and travelled around the city on horseback, writing home jokingly that he had taken the name of 'Ibn al-Rīsh wa Bārūt' (‘Son of Beard and Gunpowder’).

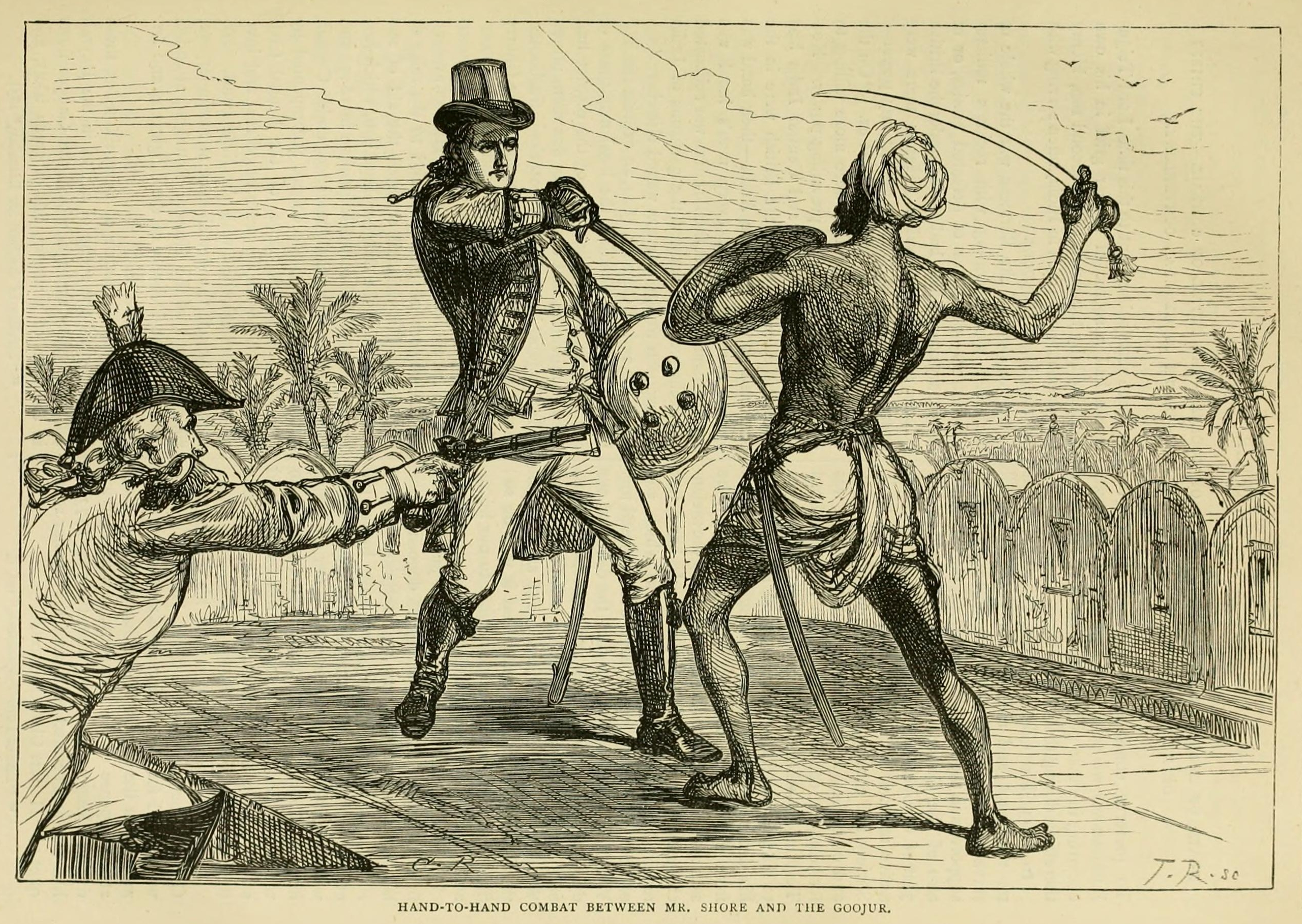
An 1891 illustration depicting Shore fighting a gurjar. Shore was injured in the fight and was saved by Frederick Young who shot the gurjar.

In October 1824 Rivers Francis Grindall (1786-1832), the magistrate of Saharanpur sent a letter requesting armed support as a gurjar leader named Kallua or Kallu sardar (who also called himself Raja Kalyan Singh) and his assistant Kowar Singh had taken over a mud fort called Koonja Ghurry (now Kunja Bahadurpur village in Roorkee district - 29.8886°N 77.7740°E) and had sworn by Kali to put an end to the rule by foreigners after assembling 800 men. Frederick Young brought 350 of his Sirmoor Battalion made up of gurkha soldiers along with Shore, lieutenant Henry De Bude, and Dr J. F. Royle. During the raid Shore was involved in a sword fight and received two deep cuts on his chest before his assailant was put down by Young with a pistol shot. A biography by Young's daughter claims that Shore had an arrow in his neck. Nearly 200 were killed in the fighting and Kallua was captured and publicly hanged in Saharanpur.

Captain Mundy described him in 1827 as "A tall handsome man with a long beard, and dressed in Mussalman costume. A great shikarri, the verandahs and rooms of his house filled with stuffed animals. He had two tame bears which sat either side of him at meals, and ate their food out of wooden bowls." Shore was a keen naturalist who collected bird specimens and John Gould examined his manuscript notes and drawings of birds from India. He was assisted in taxidermy by Lieutenant John Fisher of the Sirmoor Battalion’s who also owned a set of Latham's General History of Birds. Shore hoped to send his natural history collection to his sister. In his book he noted that he drew his first bird on 10 May 1827. Gould noted in his Birds of Asia that "but for whose premature death the ornithology of India would have been far better known to us" About 195 of watercolour plates of the birds and notes issued as an appendix to Latham's birds are in the Blacker Wood Library. He spent his summers in Dehra Dun and hunted in what is now Mussoorie. The woodpecker Dinopium shorii was named after him by Nicholas Aylward Vigors who examined a specimen exhibited by Frederick's brother C. J. Shore at the Zoological Society of London.

Shore suffered poor health following the injuries from his fight at Koonja but lived for thirteen more years until his sudden death at Spence's Hotel in Calcutta. He is buried in the North Park Street Cemetery, Calcutta.

Bird illustrations and notes by Shore

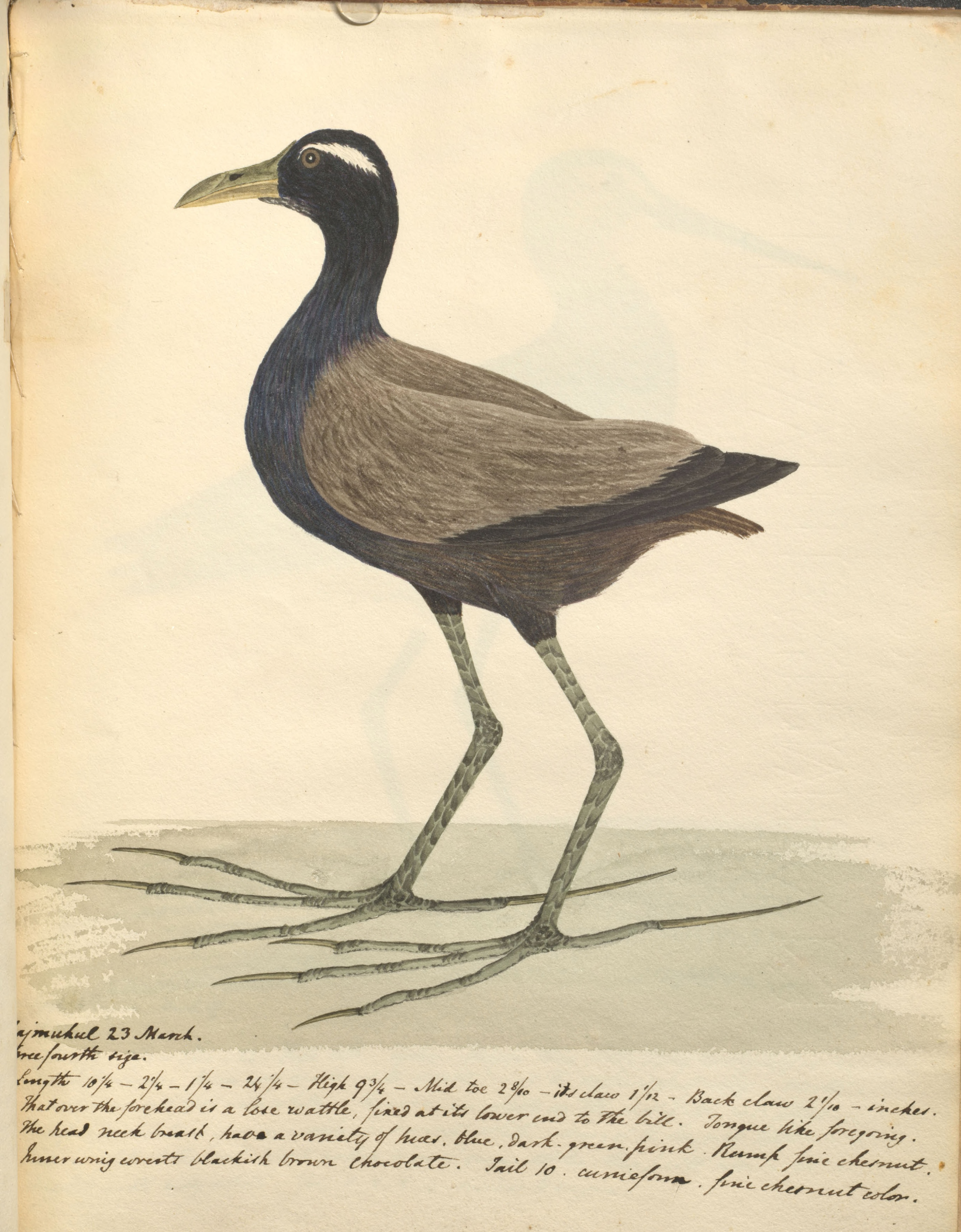

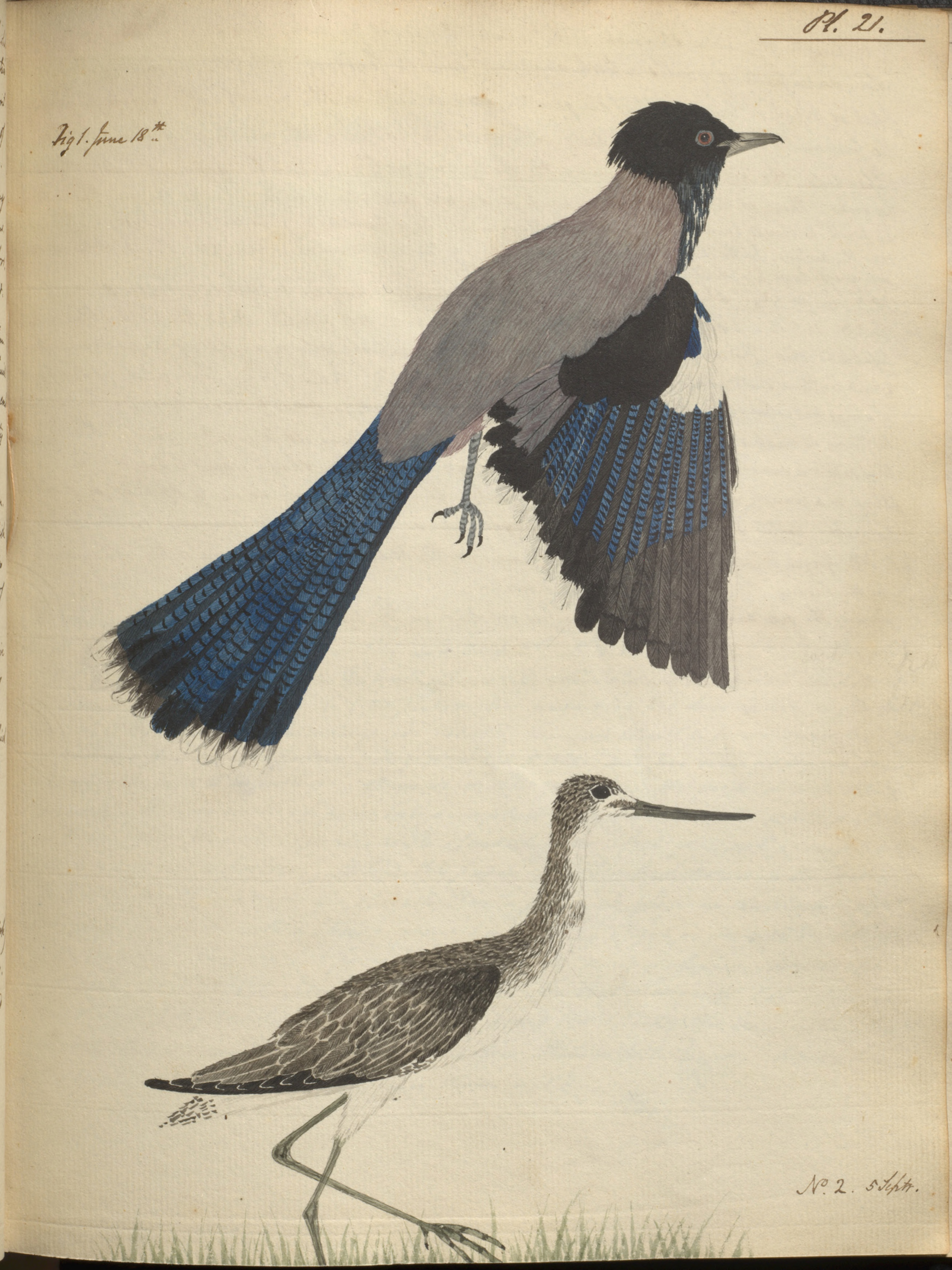

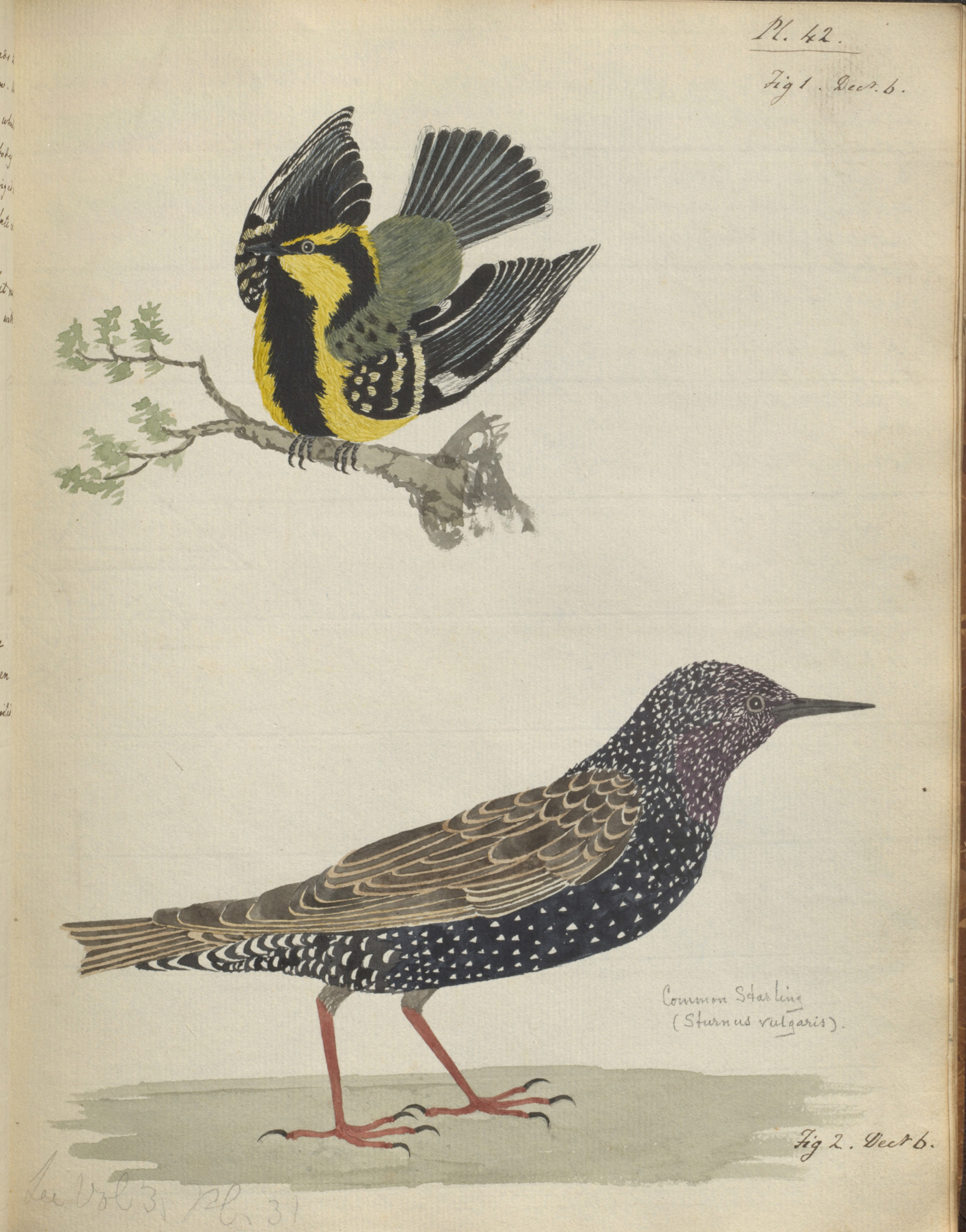

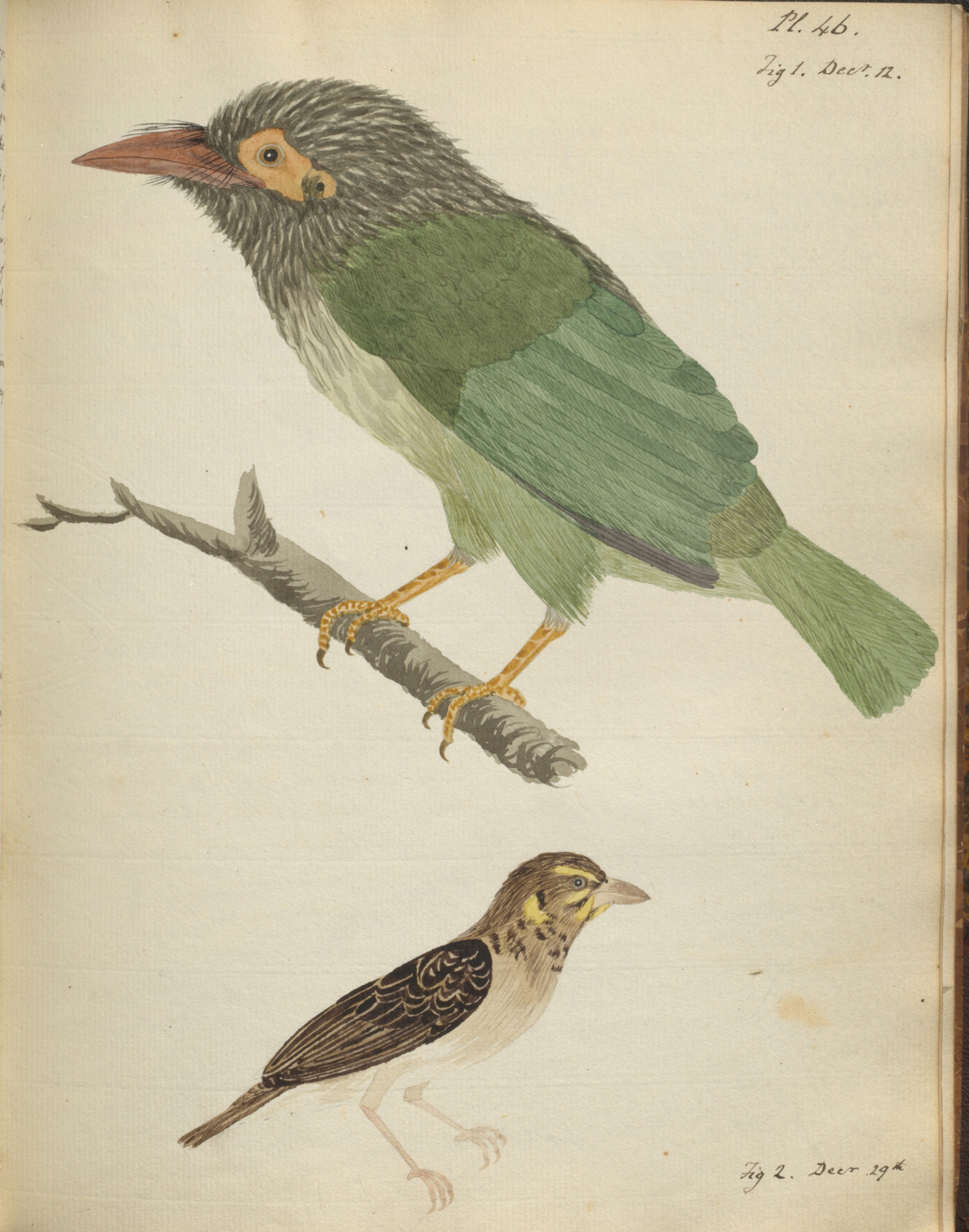

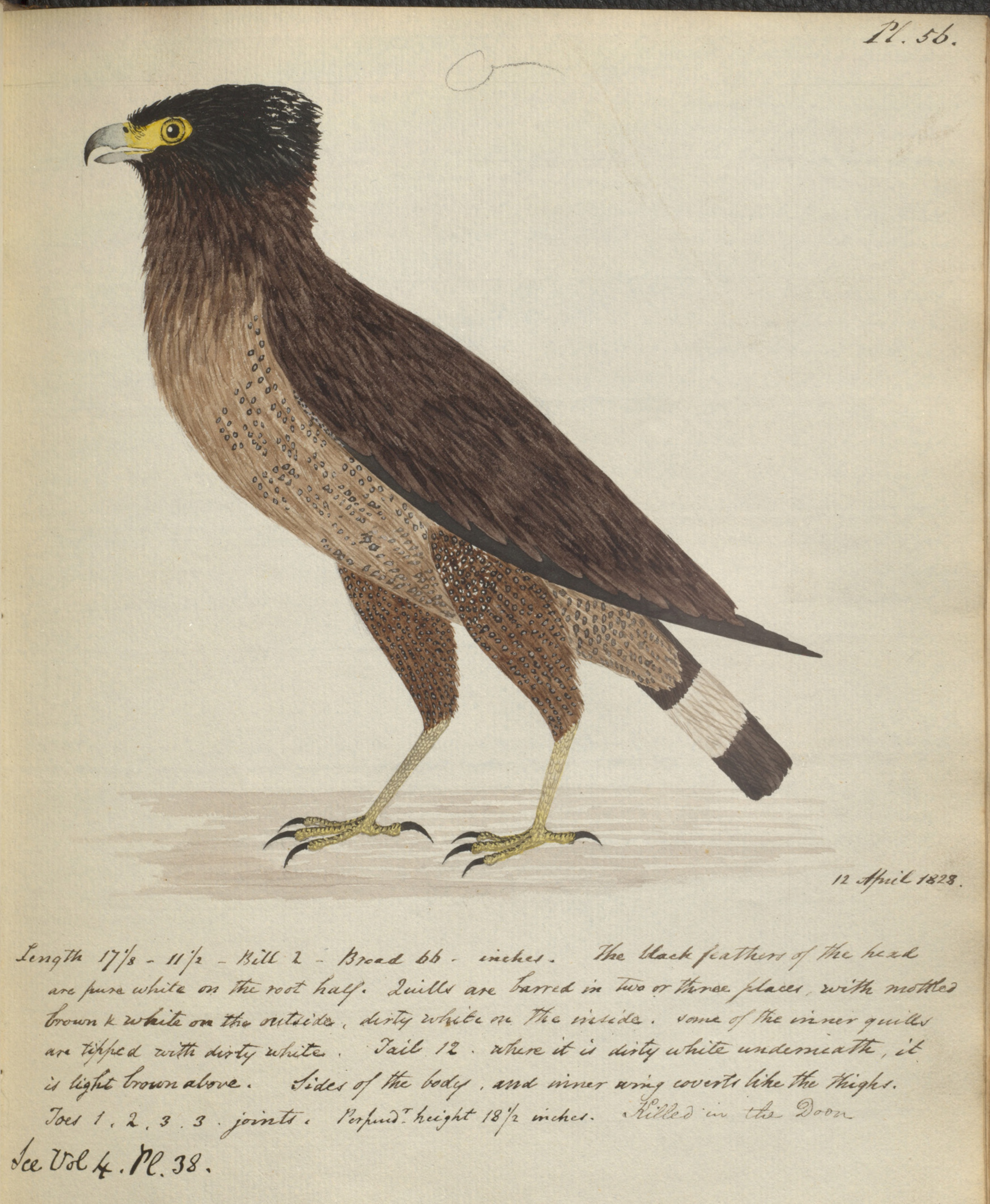

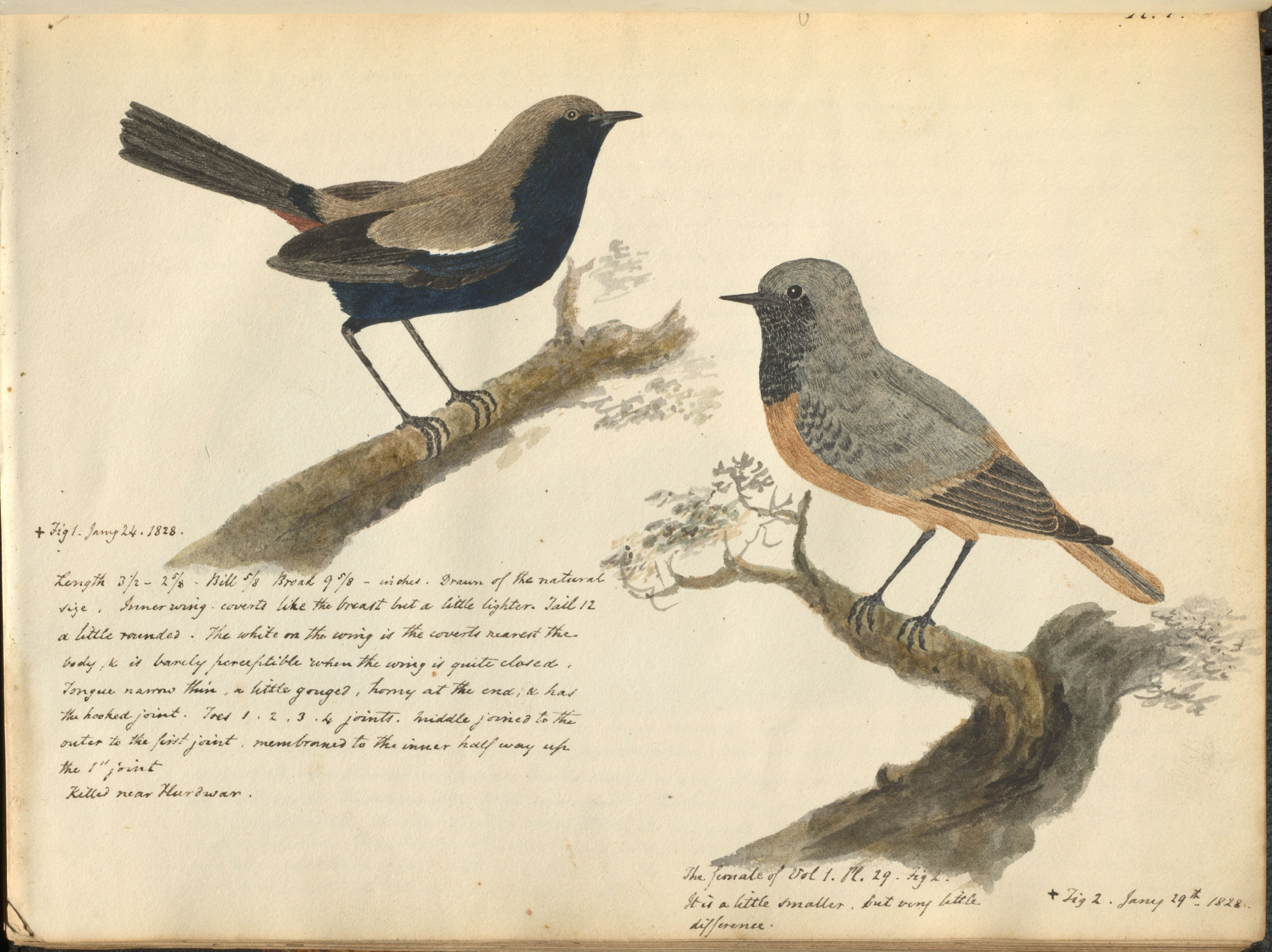

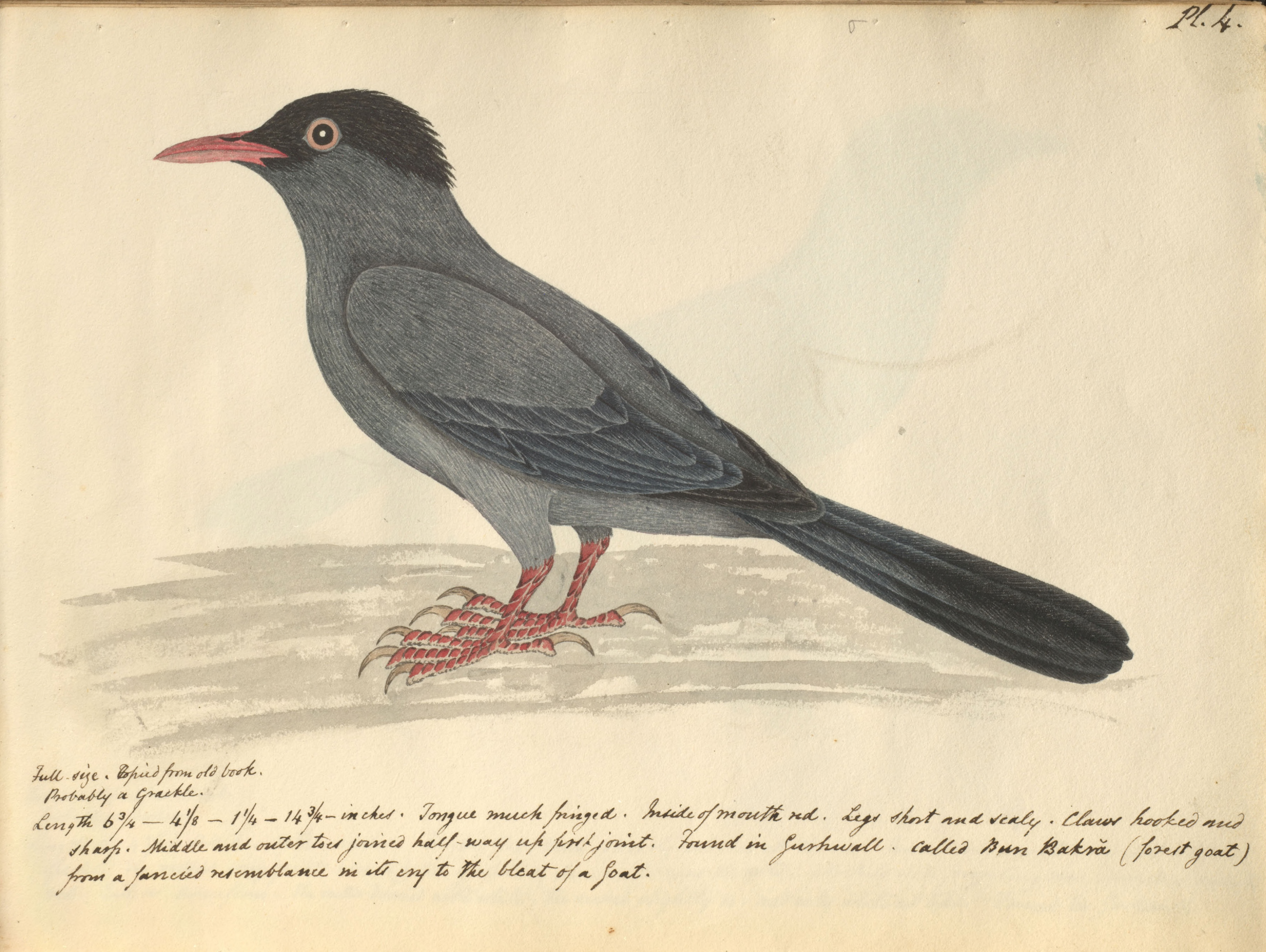

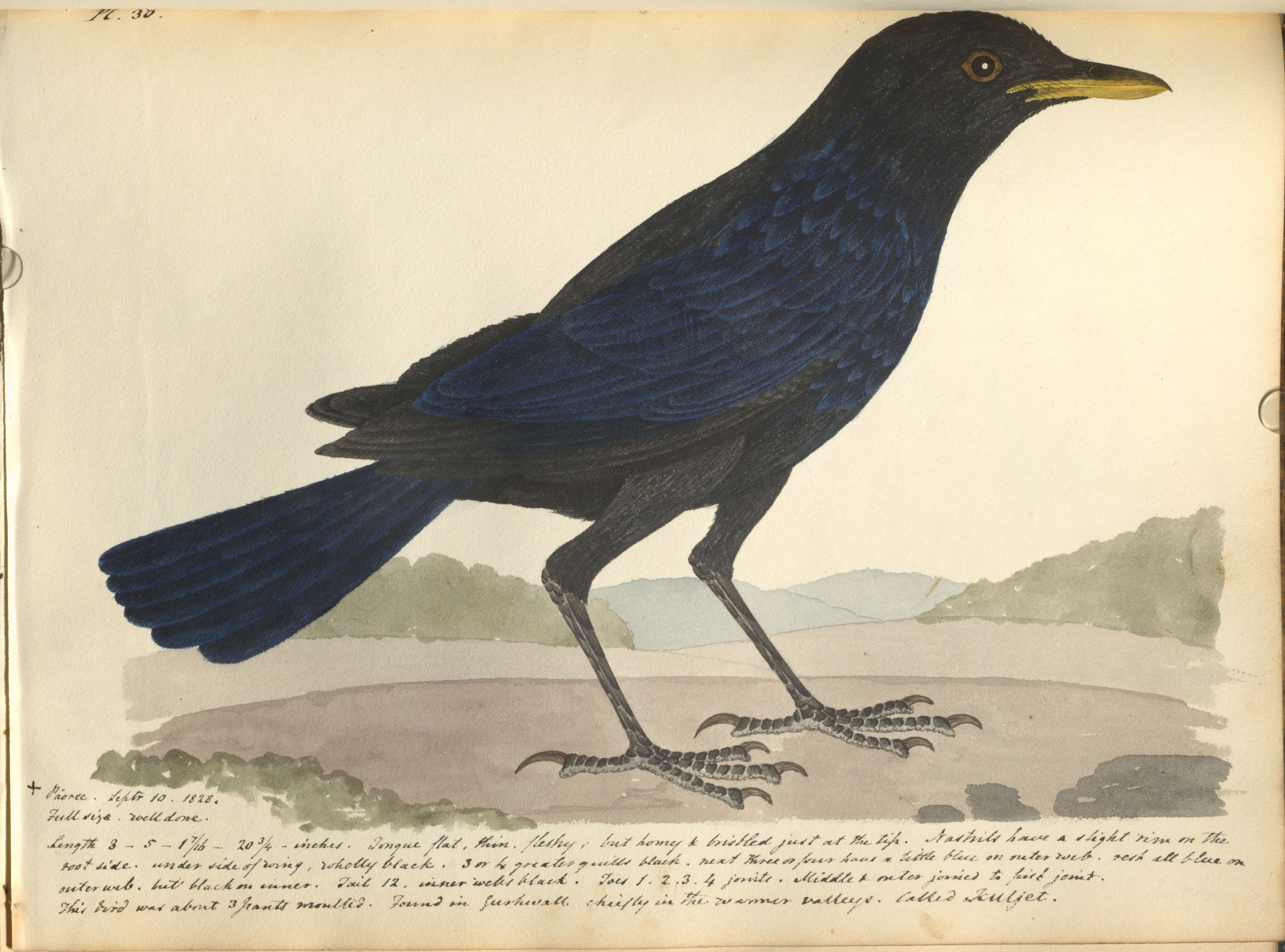

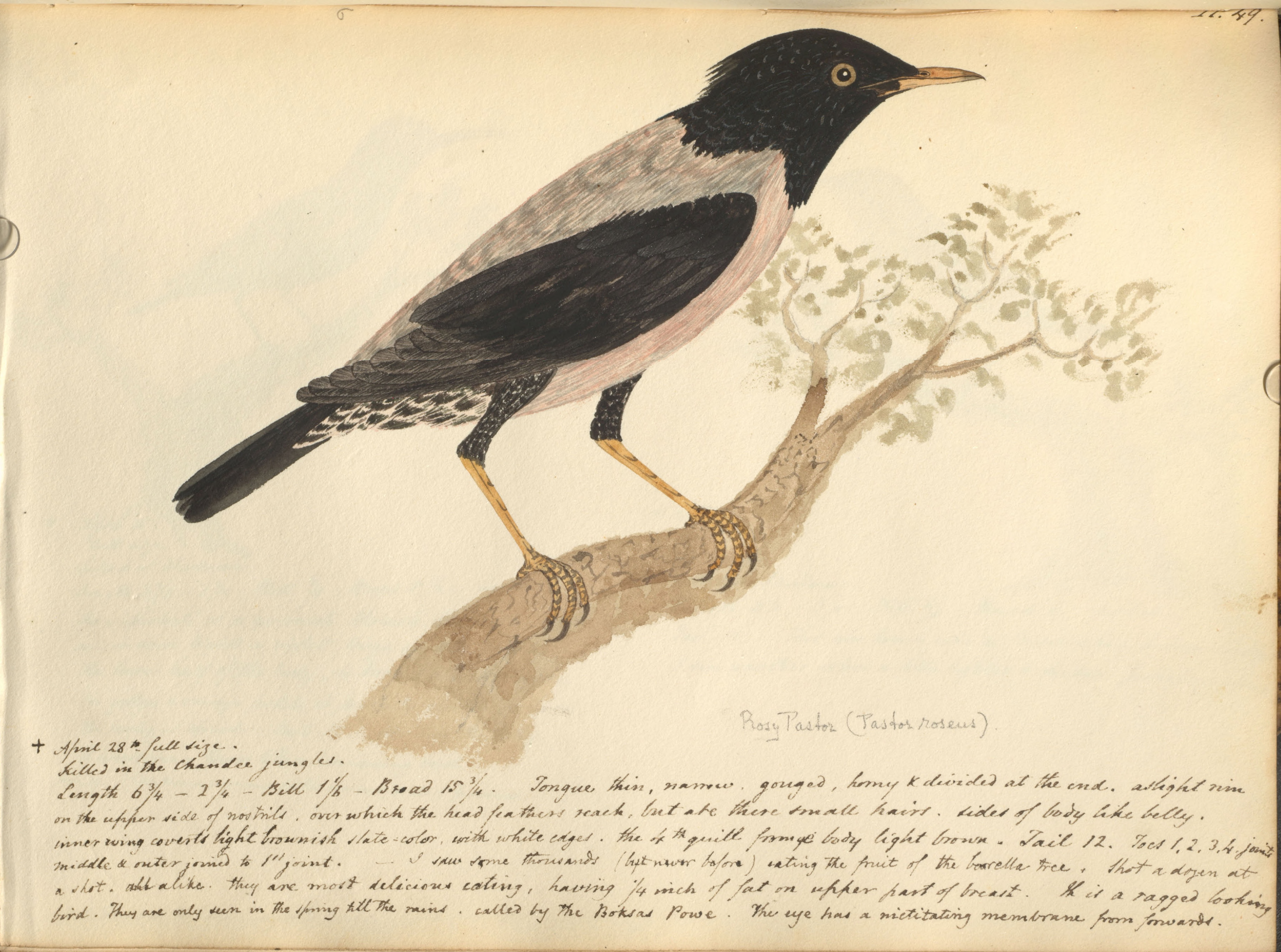

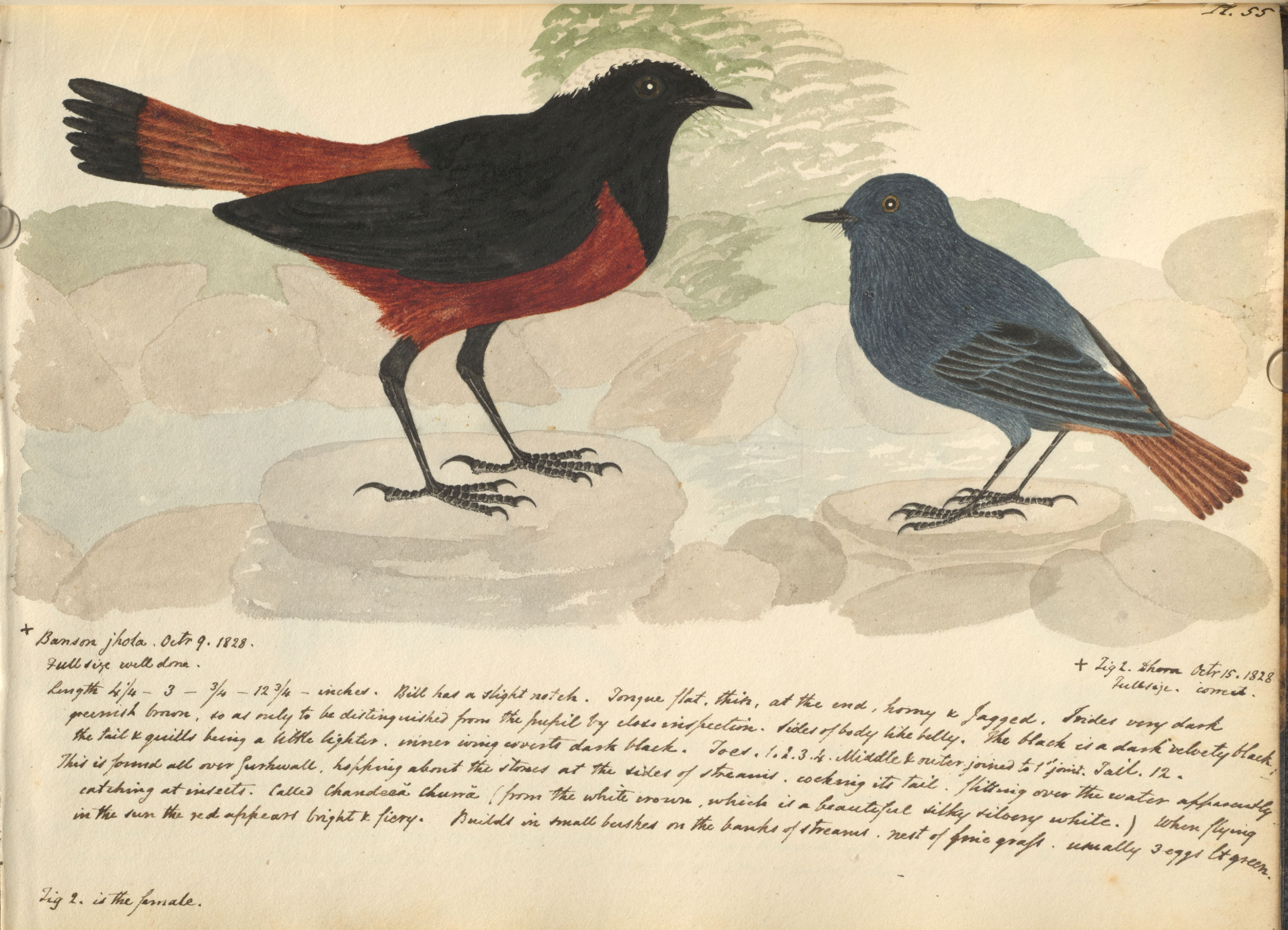

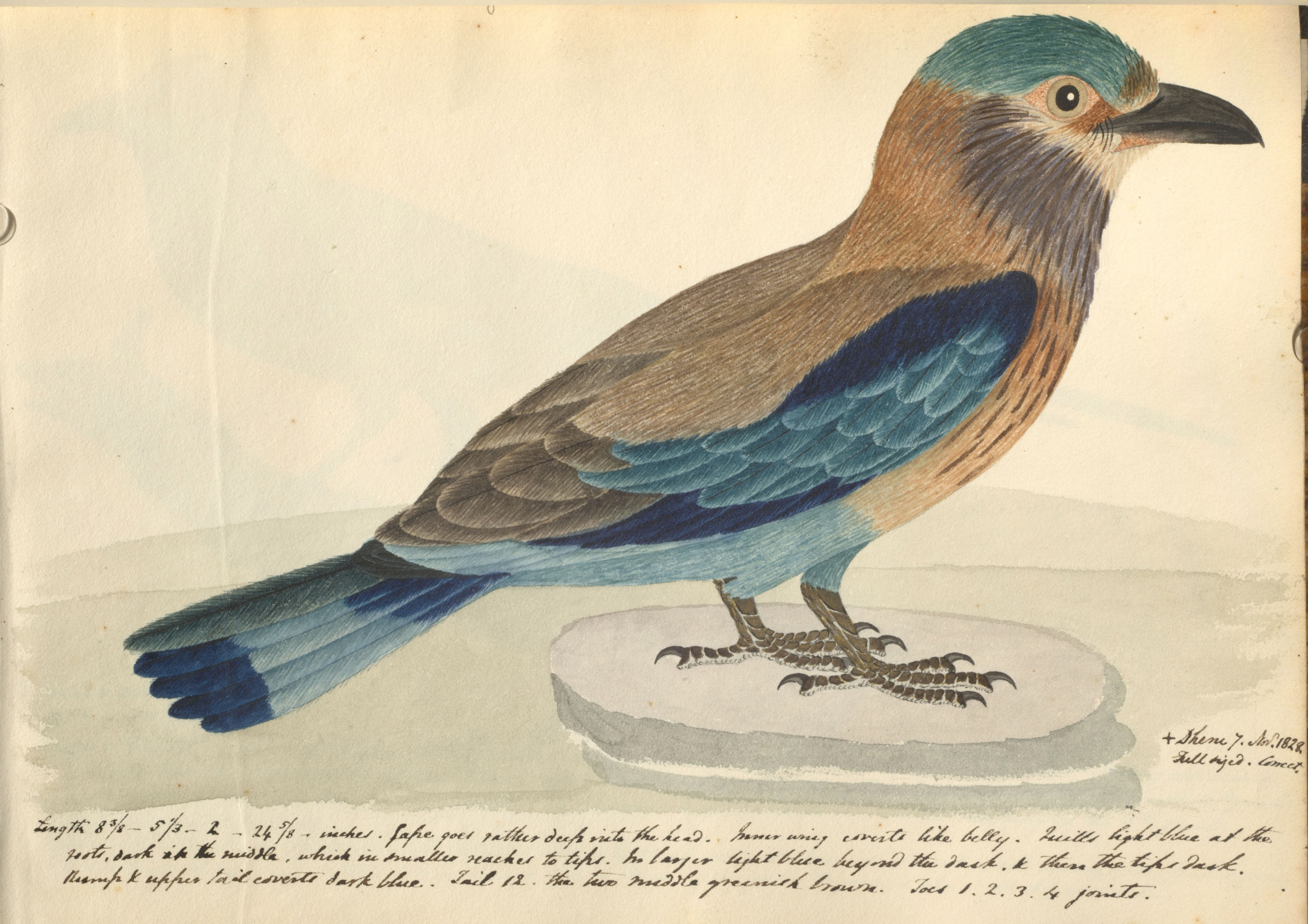

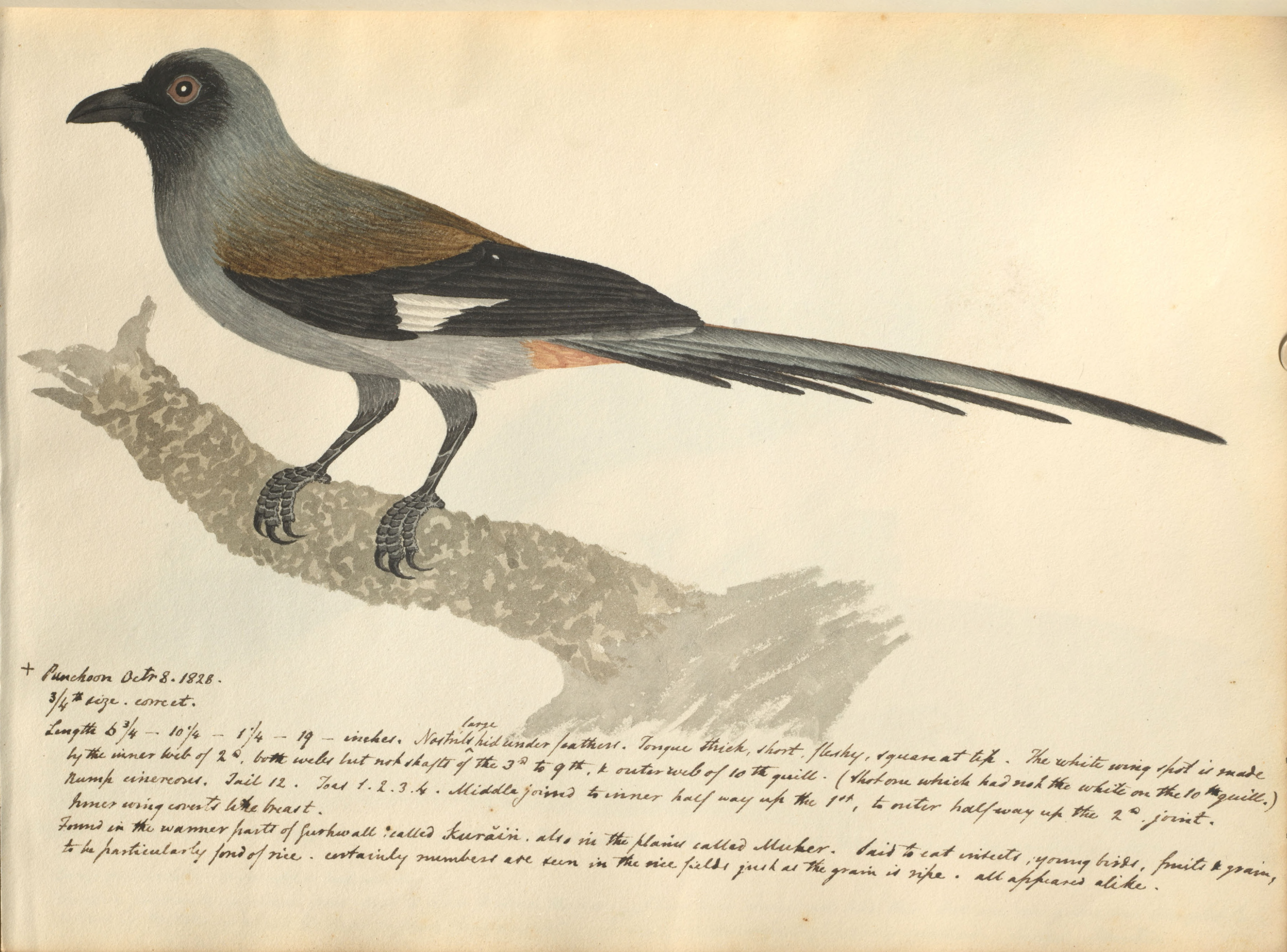

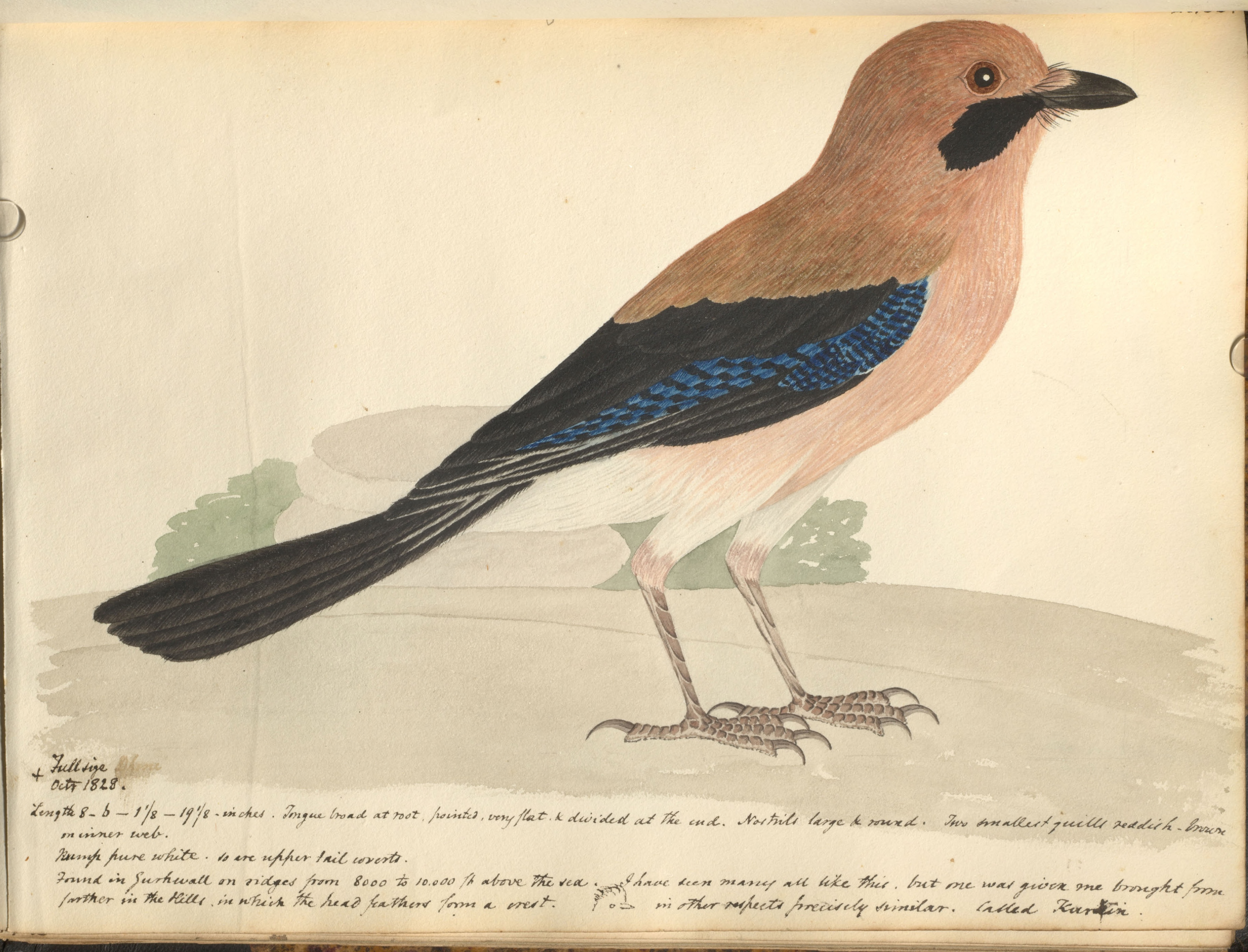

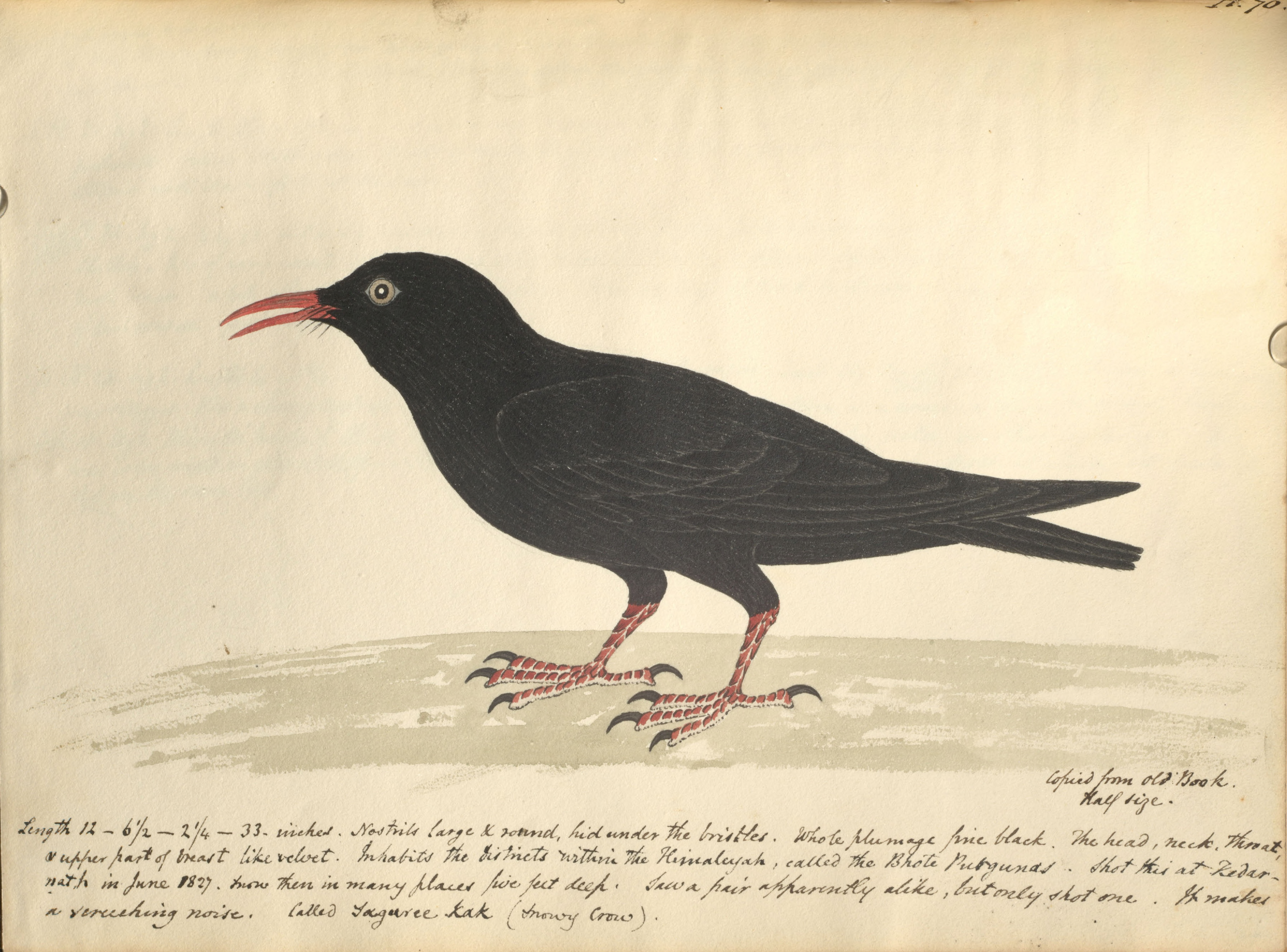
