= Emily Shore =

British writer

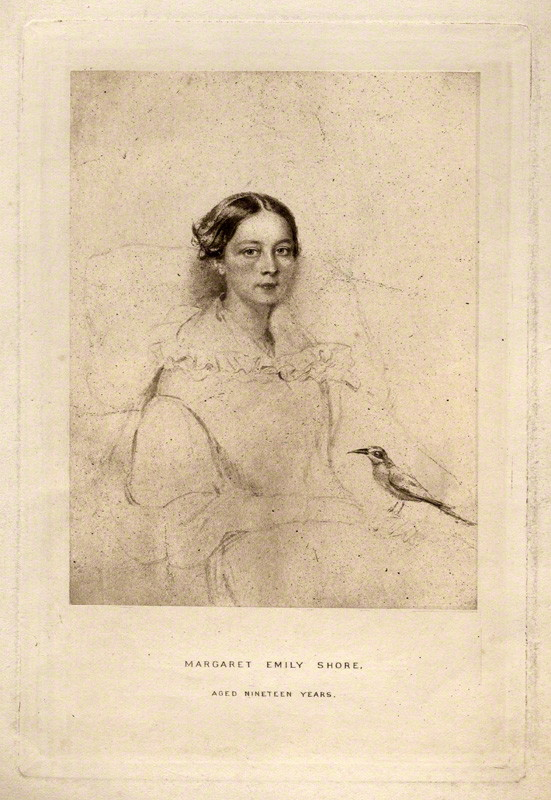
Margaret Emily Shore unknown artist, engraving, (circa 1838)

(Margaret) Emily Shore (25 December, 1819–1839) was a young English diarist.

== Life ==
Margaret Emily Shore was born in Bury St Edmunds, Suffolk on Christmas Day, 1819 to Thomas Shore and his wife, Margaret Ann (née Twopenny). She was the eldest of 5 children: having two younger sisters, Arabella (b.1822); Louisa (b.1824), and brothers, Richard (b.1821), and Mackworth (b.1825). She kept a journal from the age of eleven until her death from consumption at the age of nineteen. Her diary is less a diary and more a journal, as she herself called it: recording her thoughts on a wide range of subjects. Margaret – who went by the name of Emily – was credited with educating her two younger sisters, Arabella and Louisa Catherine Shore.

Emily Shore moved to Funchal, Madeira, with her family at the end of her life in search of a healthier climate. She died there in 1839. Her final journal is a descriptive account of life in Funchal.

Extracts of her journal were published by her sisters Louisa and Arabella in 1891, more than fifty years after her death. A second edition was published in 1898. Today only some parts of her journal are extant, but in 1991 it was discovered that Arabella had left two of her sister's journals to the British Museum. These journals are now in the United States, as they were not delivered at the time. These journals reveal that Emily's autobiography was, to a degree, converted into a biography by her then elderly sisters.

== Legacy ==
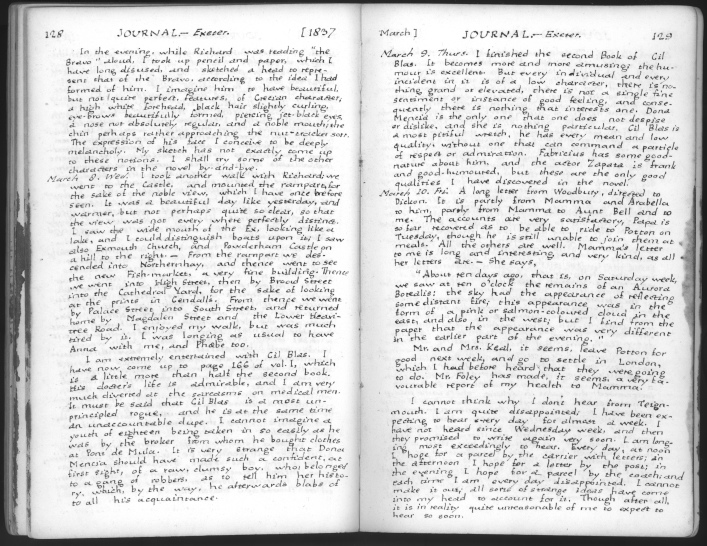
Margaret EMILY Shore - her journal - a sample

The University of Virginia Press have digitized Emily Shore's diaries to show how her sisters censored her original thoughts, what Emily Shore herself censored in her diary, and what was actually cut out of the original diary.

Alternative country band The Handsome Family recorded a song based on the diaries, "Emily Shore 1819–1839", on their 1996 album Milk and Scissors.
