= Abbasabad, Isfahan =

Abbasabad عباس اباد
- Village
- Location within Iran
- Coordinates: 32°31′12″N 51°52′52″E
- Country: Iran
- Province: Isfahan
- County: Isfahan
- Bakhsh: Central
- Rural District: Baraan-e Jonubi

Population (2006)
  - Total: 141
- Time zone: UTC+3:30 (IRST)
  - Summer (DST): UTC+4:30 (IRDT)

Abbasabad (Persian: عباس اباد, also Romanized as ‘Abbāsābād; also known as Qezel Dang) is a village in Baraan-e Jonubi Rural District, in the Central District of Isfahan County, Isfahan Province, Iran. At the 2006 census, its population was 141, in 23 families.

It was the birthplace of Mirza Abu Taleb Khan, whose travel memoirs are an early example of those from the east visiting the west.
