= Frederick Young (East India Company officer) =

British Indian Army officer

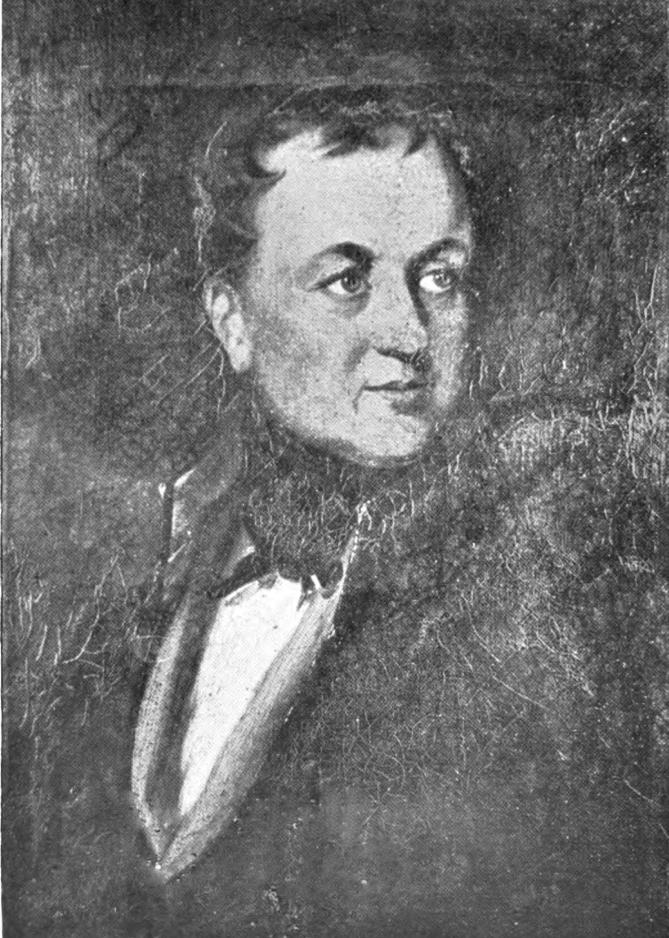
An oil-painting by L. Reynolds Gwatkin, 1839

Frederick Young (30 November 1786 – 22 May 1874) was an East India Company army officer from Ireland who became the founder of the Sirmoor Battalion later 2nd King Edward VII's Own Gurkha Rifles (The Sirmoor Rifles), the first Gurkha regiment to fight for the British. He also established a hunting lodge in Mussoorie along with Frederick John Shore which was a precursor to the development of the area as a British settlement. He is considered as the founder of the British settlement at Mussoorie.

== Life and work ==
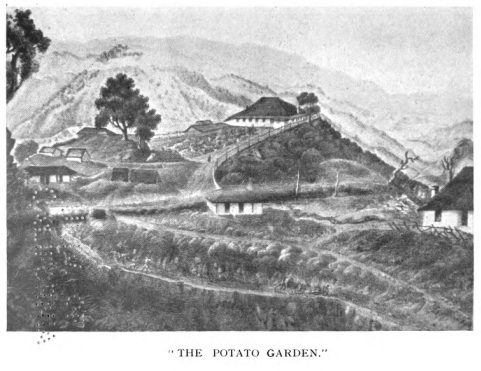
A picture of Young's potato garden in Mussoorie

Young was born in Greencastle, near Moville, on the Inishowen peninsula, in north County Donegal, Ireland. He came from an old family of Presbyterian landlords who came to Culdaff in the 17th century as tenants of the Marquis of Donegal. His father was Rev. Gardiner Young (1745-1822) who served as Rector in Moville and Coleraine. His mother was Catherine Richardson and Frederick Harvey, Bishop of Derry was his godfather. (Note: Jenkins:3.)

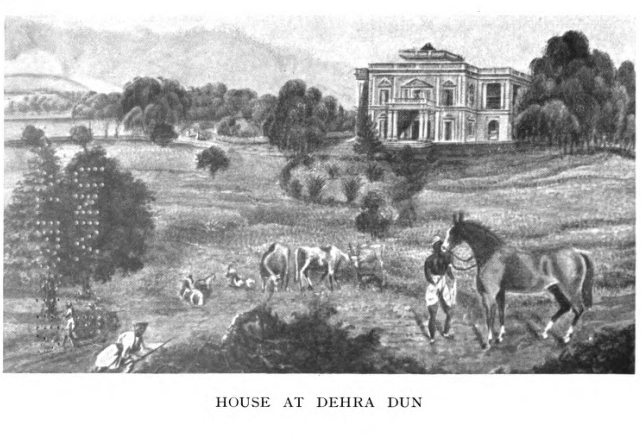
Young's home in Dehra Dun

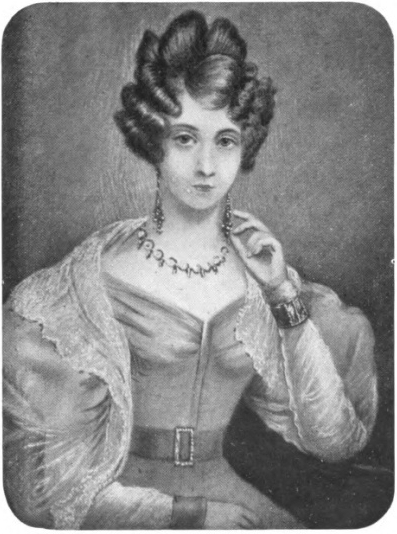
Jeanette Young in 1825

Young went to India at the age of 15, and joined the East India Company army as an ensign. He served initially under General Lake in central India, seeing action in the Second Anglo-Maratha War (1803-05). (Note: Jenkins:8-11.) He then became an Aide-de-Camp to Sir Rollo Gillespie and served in Java. (Note: Jenkins:28-39.) In 1814 he followed Gillespie into Nepal to wrest control from the gurkhas of the Kathmandu Valley. Gillespie was killed in the Battle of Nalapani, dying in the arms of Young. Command was then transferred to General David Ochterlony. During the Nepal war Young was briefly held prisoner by the gurkhas who supposedly appreciated his bravery. (Note: Jenkins:40-49.) A campaign at Jaithak fort where Young was involved was successful and the gurkhas were defeated. He was able to convince the gurkhas to serve the English and he founded the Sirmoor Regiment at Nahan in Sirmoor State in 1815. He was promoted from Lieutenant to Captain in 1821, Major in 1826, and Lt. Col. in 1830. He served as a political agent for Dehra Dun from 1829 which also became the home of the regiment. The regiment of about 3000 soldiers was to prompt Young to say that "I came there one man, and I came back three thousand". They saw action during the Third Mahratta War and played a major role at Delhi during 1857. (Note: Jenkins:51-59.) Young also assisted Frederick John Shore during the campaign against a gurjar leader in 1824 at Saharanpur. (Note: Jenkins:59-61.) In December 1849 Young was diverted from Dinapore to Darjeeling to prepare for an invasion of Sikkim following the hostage situation involving the botanist Joseph Hooker. (Note: Jenkins:148-150.)

Young was a keen sport hunter and along with Frederick Shore he set up a hunting lodge near Mussoorie on a slope at Camel's back. This area was later to become an important British settlement in the hills. Young built a bungalow in Mussoorie called “Mullingar” after his home in Ireland. Young introduced tea and potato cultivation into the region. (Note: Jenkins:63-64.) He retired with the rank of Major General in 1854 (promoted to General in 1865) (Note: Jenkins:175.) to live in Fairy Hill, Bray, Ireland. He married Jeanette Jamesina (13 February 1808, Berhampore – 10 April 1852, died in Dinapore, buried in Calcutta) daughter of Colonel John Jenkins Bird in 1825 (Note: Jenkins:71.) and they had eight children. He died at The Albany, his Dublin townhouse aged 88.

== Other sources ==
- Young, Amy (1924). Three Hundred Years in Inishowen. Belfast.
- Bonner, Brian (1972). Our Inishowen Heritage. Dublin.
- Harkin, Michael (1935). Inishowen its History, Tradition and Antiquities. Carndonagh.
