= John Shore, 1st Baron Teignmouth =

Governor-General of India

The Right Honourable The Lord Teignmouth
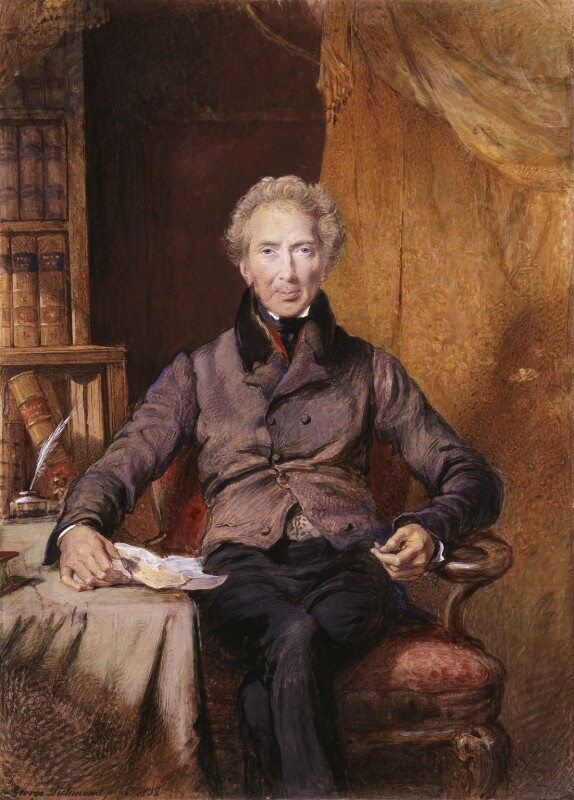
- Watercolour by George Richmond, 1832

Governor-General of the Presidency of Fort William
- In office October 1793 – March 1798
- Monarch: George III
- Preceded by: The Earl Cornwallis
- Succeeded by: Sir Alured Clarke (Acting Governor-General)

Personal details
- Born: 5 October 1751 St James's, London
- Died: 14 February 1834 (aged 82) Portman Square, London
- Resting place: St Marylebone Parish Church
- Spouse: Charlotte Cornish (m. 1786)
- Children: 9, including Charles John
- Education: Harrow School

John Shore, 1st Baron Teignmouth (5 October 1751 – 14 February 1834) was a British official of the East India Company who served as Governor-General of Bengal from 1793 to 1798. In 1798 he was created Baron Teignmouth in the Peerage of Ireland. Shore was the first president of the British and Foreign Bible Society. A close friend of the orientalist Sir William Jones (1746–1794), Shore edited a memoir of Jones's life in 1804, containing many of Jones's letters.

== Early life ==
Born in St. James's Street, Piccadilly, on 5 October 1751, he was the elder son of Thomas Shore of Melton Place, near Romford, an East India Company employee, by his wife Dorothy, daughter of Captain Shepherd of the company's naval service. At the age of fourteen Shore was sent to Harrow School. In his seventeenth year Shore was moved to a commercial school at Hoxton for the purpose of learning bookkeeping, to take up an opportunity made for him by the merchant Frederick Pigou, a family friend. Towards the close of 1768 he sailed for India as a writer in the East India Company's service.

Soon after his arrival in Kolkata, then called Calcutta, in May 1769 Shore was appointed to the secret political department, in which he remained for about twelve months. In September 1770 he was nominated assistant to the board of revenue at Murshidabad. Shore at the age of 19 suddenly found himself invested with the civil and fiscal jurisdiction of a large district; he also studied languages.

In 1772 Shore went to Rajshahi as first assistant to the resident of the province. In the following year he acted temporarily as Persian translator and secretary to the board at Murshidabad. In June 1775 he was appointed a member of the revenue council at Calcutta. He continued to hold that post until the dissolution of the council at the close of 1780. Though he revised one of the bitter philippics launched by Philip Francis against Warren Hastings, and is said to have written one of the memorials against the supreme court and Sir Elijah Impey, he was appointed by the governor-general to a seat in the committee of revenue at Calcutta, which took the place of the provincial council.

== Revenue official ==
Shore gained the confidence of Hastings by attention to his duties. Besides superintending the collection of the revenues, he devoted much of his time to the adjudication of exchequer cases. He acted as revenue commissioner in Dacca and Behar, and he drew up plans for judicial and financial reforms. Deploring the lavish profusion of the governor-general, Shore communicated his views of the financial situation to John Macpherson, who, instead of privately imparting them to Hastings, inserted them as a minute into the records of the Supreme Council. As a result of what was seen as a breach of confidence, Shore resigned his seat on the board.

In January 1785 Shore returned to England in the company of Hastings. While in England, on 14 February 1786 he married Charlotte, the only daughter of James Cornish, a medical practitioner at Teignmouth.

Having been appointed by the Court of Directors to a seat on the Supreme Council, Shore returned to India, and on 21 January 1787 he took his seat as a member of the government of Bengal. Many of the reforms instituted by Charles Cornwallis were attributable to Shore's influence in the council. In the summer of 1789, Shore completed the ten-yearly settlement of the revenues of Bengal, Bihar, and Odisha. Though Shore recommended caution and further inquiry, and protested against rigidity, his decision in favour of the proprietary rights of the zamindars was ratified by Cornwallis and formed the basis of the much discussed Permanent Settlement.

In December 1789, Shore embarked for England, where he arrived in April 1790. He is said to have refused the offer of a baronetcy on the ground of "the incompatibility of poverty and titles". On 2 June 1790 he was examined as a witness in the trial of Warren Hastings with regard to the transactions of the committee of revenue at Calcutta, and he testified to his friend's popularity among the Indians.

== Governor-general ==
Shore was appointed by the court of directors governor-general of India in succession to Cornwallis on 19 September 1792, and was created a baronet on 2 October following; Edmund Burke protested vainly. Shore embarked for India at the end of the month. On 10 March 1793 he arrived at Calcutta, where he remained without official employment or responsibility until the departure of Cornwallis. He succeeded to the government on 28 October 1793.

The period of Shore's rule as governor-general was comparatively uneventful. His policy was attacked as temporising and timid. He acquiesced in the invasion by the Marathas of the dominions of Ali Khan Asaf Jah II, the Nizam of Hyderabad; he permitted the growth of a French subsidiary force in the service of more than one native power; he thwarted Lord Hobart's efforts for extending the sphere of British influence; and he looked on while Tipu Sahib was preparing for war. In these matters Shore faithfully obeyed his instructions.

Though he showed weakness in dealing with the mutiny of the officers of the Bengal army, he boldly settled the question of the Oudh succession, when he substituted Saadat Ali Khan II for Wazir Ali Khan, albeit at the cost of the Massacre of Benares. As a reward for his services Shore was created Baron Teignmouth, of Teignmouth in the peerage of Ireland by letters patent executed at Dublin on 3 March 1798.

== Later life ==
Resigning the government into the hands of Sir Alured Clarke, Teignmouth left India in March 1798. On 4 April 1807 he was appointed a member of the board of control, an office to which no salary was attached, and four days afterwards was sworn a member of the privy council. He occasionally transacted business at the board of control, or at the Cockpit, where as a privy councillor he sometimes decided Indian appeals with Sir William Grant and Sir John Nicholl. But he occupied the most of his time in religious and philanthropic matters, though he nominally remained a member of the board until February 1828.

Teignmouth never took his seat in the Irish House of Lords, nor was he elected a representative peer after the union. He was twice examined before the House of Commons on Indian affairs, on 18 June 1806 and on 30 March 1813. In consequence of the order of the House of Commons for Teignmouth's attendance on the first occasion, the House of Lords on 19 July 1806 passed a resolution maintaining the privilege of peerage as apart from the privilege of parliament. This resolution, however, was not communicated to the Commons; and on the second occasion the order of the Commons for Teignmouth's attendance was not questioned by the Lords.

Shore became a prominent member of the Clapham sect: from 1802 to 1808 he lived at Clapham. He then moved to London, where he passed the remainder of his days. He was elected the first president of the British and Foreign Bible Society on 14 May 1804, and held that office until the end of his life. He took an active part in the various controversies in the Society, and gave his decision in favour of the exclusion of the apocryphal books from all editions of the Bible issued by the society. He died at his house in Portman Square on 14 February 1834, aged 82, and was buried in Marylebone parish church, where a monument was erected to his memory.

Teignmouth was elected president of the Royal Society of Literature, but declined the office in favour of Bishop Burgess.

== Works ==
Teignmouth was a close friend of Sir William Jones, whom he succeeded as president of the Asiatic Society of Bengal on 22 May 1794. On that occasion he delivered an address on the 'Literary History' of his predecessor (London, 1795), which was frequently reprinted, and has been translated into Italian. Three of his contributions to the society are printed in 'Asiatick Researches' (ii. 307–22, 383–7, iv. 331– 350). He translated in three manuscript volumes the Persian version of an abridgment of the 'Jôg Bashurst,' but later destroyed them in consequence of the little encouragement which his translations of Persian versions of Hindu authors received. He wrote a number of articles for the Christian Observer, and the earlier annual reports of the Bible Society were written by him. He was also the author of some mediocre verse. He published:

- ‘Memoirs of the Life, Writings, and Correspondence of Sir William Jones,’ London, 1804. This passed through several editions, and formed vols. i. and ii. of ‘The Works of Sir William Jones,’ which were edited by Lady Jones (London, 1807, 13 vols.)
- ‘Considerations on the Practicability, Policy, and Obligation of communicating to the Natives of India the Knowledge of Christianity. With Observations on he “Prefatory Remarks” to a pamphlet published by Major Scott Waring. By a late Resident in Bengal,’ London, 1808. Reply to John Scott-Waring.
- 'A Letter to the Rev. Christopher Wordsworth, D.D., in reply to his Strictures on the British and Foreign Bible Society,' London, 1810.
- 'Thoughts on the Providence of God,' London, 1834 (anon.)

A portrait of Teignmouth was painted by Arthur William Devis.

== Family ==
Teignmouth had three sons and six daughters by his wife, who died on 13 July 1834. He was succeeded in the title by his eldest son, Charles John Shore. His second son, Frederick John, married Charlotte Mary Cornish of Devonshire in 1830. His second daughter, Anna Maria, married Sir Thomas Hill. Another daughter, Caroline Dorothea, married Rev. Robert Anderson (their eldest daughter, Florence Caroline, married Lord Alwyne Compton). Shore was great-uncle to the poet Louisa Catherine Shore.

Coat of arms of John Shore, 1st Baron Teignmouth
| Crest A stork regardant with a stone in its dexter claw Proper. Escutcheon Argent a chevron Sable between three holly leaves Vert. Supporters Two storks regardant Proper. Motto Perimus Licitis (We Die In A Good Cause) |

Government offices
| Preceded by The Marquess Cornwallis | Governor-General of India; 1793–1798 | Succeeded by Sir Alured Clarke, acting |
Peerage of Ireland
| New creation | Baron Teignmouth; 1798–1834 | Succeeded by Charles Shore |
Baronetage of Great Britain
| New creation | Baronet (of Heathcote); 1792–1834 | Succeeded by Charles Shore |
