= Louisa Catherine Shore =

English poet

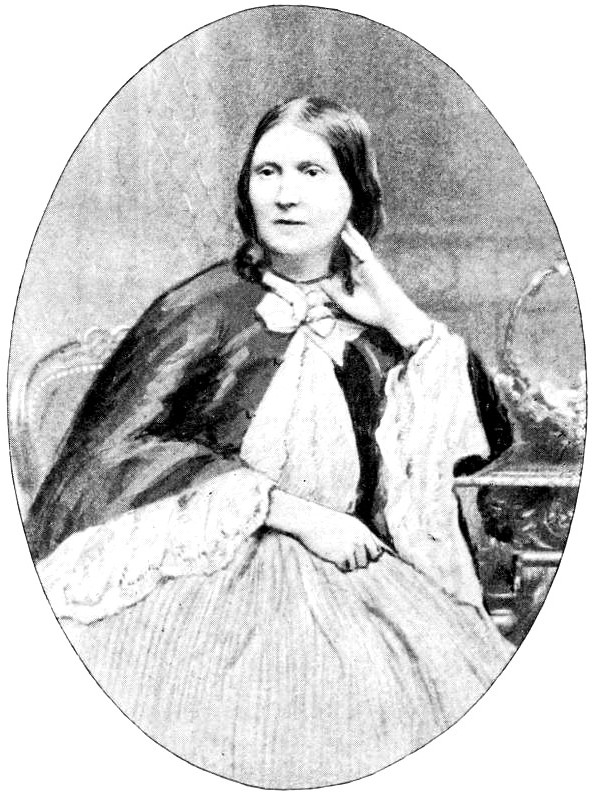
Louisa Catherine Shore

Louisa Catherine Shore (February 1824, Potton, Bedfordshire – 24 May 1895 Wimbledon, England) was an English poet. She was an active writer who often worked with her sister, Arabella Susanna Shore. They were both taught by their elder sister, who died young, but is now known as a diarist.

== Biography ==
Louisa Catherine Shore was the youngest daughter of three daughters and two sons of Margaret Anne Twopeny and Thomas Shore. Louisa Shore and her two sisters, (Margaret) Emily Shore and Arabella Susanna Shore, were intelligent with a passion for learning and an interest in literature. Emily who died young was the tutor to her two younger sisters. She is now a noted diarist. Louisa Shore often worked as a writer with her sister Arabella Shore. The first composition Louisa Shore wrote was War Music which was a poem on the Crimean War. Arabellla sent this poem in to The Spectator without her knowledge and then the two sisters came to an agreement and the composition was reprinted as War Lyrics.

== Other literary works ==
The two remaining sisters composed many other literary productions together such as Gemma of the Isles, a Lyrical Poem in 1859, Fra Dolcino, and other Poems in 1871 and Elegies and Memorials in 1890. In their last production together, Louisa Shore published two elegies, one was for the loss of her oldest sister Margaret Emily Shore who suffered from tuberculosis and the other was for her brother Mackworth Charles Shore who was lost at sea in 1860. The two sisters published a selection from Margaret Emily Shore's Journal and it proves how talented a writer she was. Louisa and Arabella were supporters of the cause of women, Louisa was also a Liberal and a suffragist. In April 1874, Louisa Shore submitted an article for the Westminster Review, which discussed the women's movement and it was reprinted several times. In this pamphlet, she discusses with verve the nature of contemporary marriage.

Shore's literary works reflect the feminist art movement because her poems often reflect women's experiences. In her younger days, Louisa Shore spent time in Fulham where she met the actress Fanny Kemble and the author Sara Coleridge. She traveled around France and stayed in Paris for three years. In 1861, Shore published Hannibal which is a two-part drama with five acts in each two part verse. This drama received excellent reviews from The Athenaeum and The Saturday Review. In the later life, she resided at Orchard Pyle, Poyle with her sister Arabella. On 24 May 1895, Catherine Louisa Shore died at 16 Hillside in Wimbledon, at the age of seventy one. She was cremated at Woking Crematorium in Wimbledon. Her sister Arabella, published a memoir of her and her works.

== Works ==
- War Lyrics, 1855
- Gemma of the Isles, a Lyrical Poem, 1859
- Hannibal: a Poem in two Parts, published separately in 1861
- Fra Dolcino, and Other Poems, 1871
- Elegies and Memories, 1890
- Poems, (1897)

A selection of her unpublished poems was edited, after her death, by her sister in 1896, with an appreciative notice by Mr. Frederic Harrison, and a reissue of some of her dramas and poems appeared in 1897
