= Wazir Ali Khan =

Asif Jah Mirza Wazir Ali Khan
- Nawab of Oudh; Marhoom-wa-Muqfoor (Note: Posthumous title)
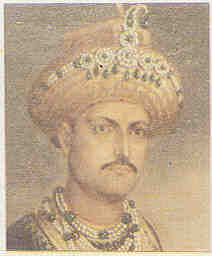

5th Nawab of Awadh
- Reign: 21 September 1797 – 21 January 1798
- Coronation: 21 September 1797, Lucknow
- Predecessor: Asaf-ud-Daula
- Successor: Saadat Ali Khan
- Born: 19 April 1780; Lucknow, Kingdom of Awadh
- Died: 15 May 1817 (aged 37); Fort William, British India
- Burial: Kasia Bagan, Kolkata, India
Names
- Asif Jah Mirza Wazir Ali Khan
- House: Nishapuri
- Dynasty: Awadh
- Religion: Shia Islam

Wazir Ali Khan (19 April 1780 – 15 May 1817) was the fifth Nawab of Kingdom of Awadh from 21 September 1797 to 21 January 1798 and the adopted son of Asaf-ud-Daulah.

== Life ==
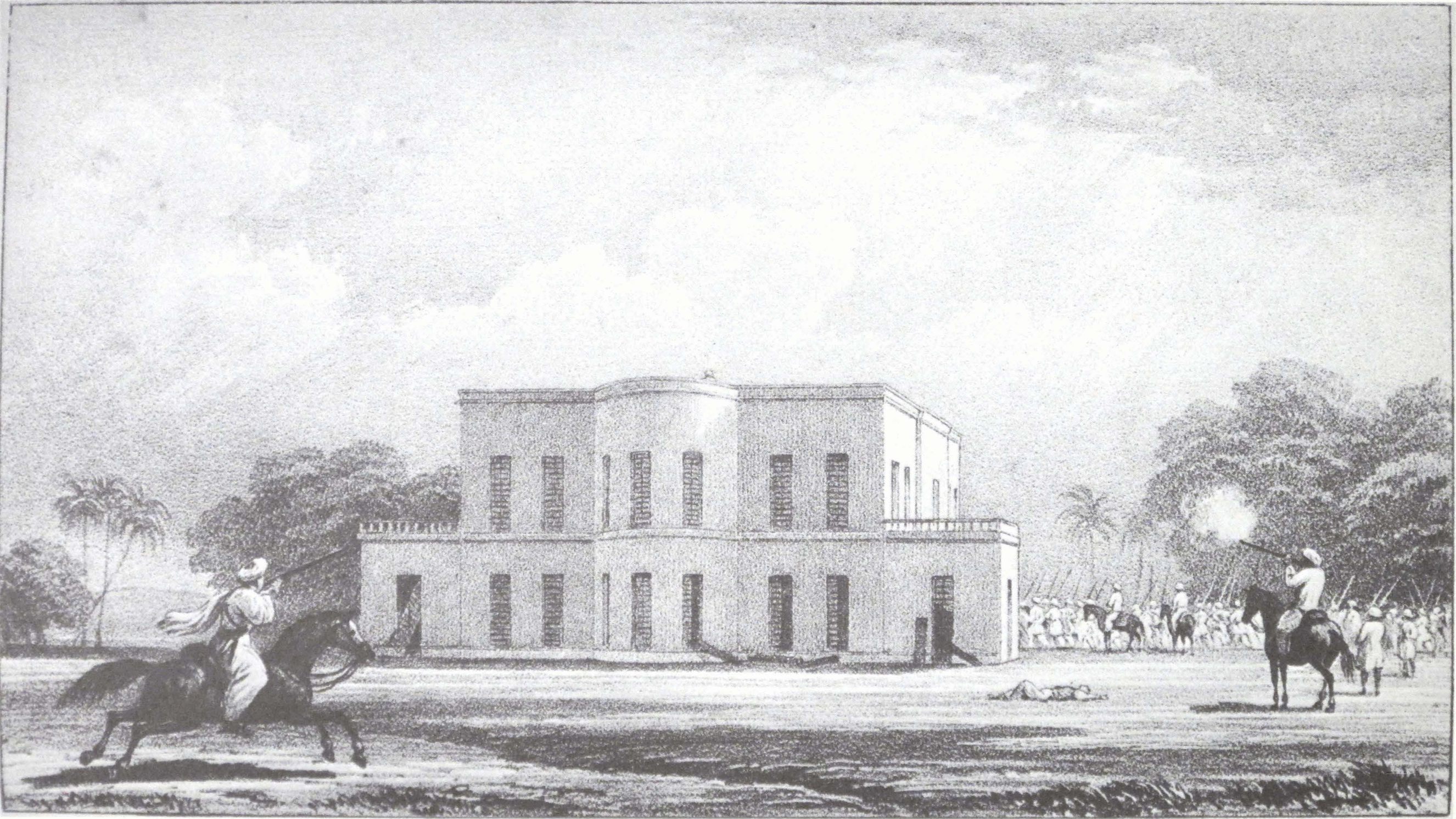
Attack on Samuel Davis' House (14 January 1799)

Asaf-ud-Daulah, who had no son, adopted Ali, the son of his sister. At 13 years of age, Ali was married at the cost of £300,000 in Lucknow.

After the death of his surrogate father in September 1797, he ascended to the throne (musnud), with the support of the British. Within four months they accused him of being disloyal. Sir John Shore (1751–1834) then moved in with 12 battalions and replaced him with his uncle Saadat Ali Khan.

Ali was granted a pension of 300,000 Rupees and moved to Benares. The government in Calcutta decided that he should be removed further from his former realm. George Frederick Cherry, a British resident, relayed this order to him on 14 January 1799 during a breakfast invitation at which Ali had appeared with an armed guard. During the ensuing argument, Ali struck Cherry a blow with his saber, whereupon the guards killed the resident and two more Europeans. They then set out to attack the house of Samuel Davis, the Magistrate of Benares, who defended himself on the staircase of his house with a pike until rescued by British troops. The affair became known as the Massacre of Benares.

Subsequently, Ali assembled a rebellious army of several thousand men. A quickly assembled force commanded by General Erskine moved into Benares and "restored order" by 21 January. Ali fled to Azamgarh then to Butwal, Rajputana where he was granted asylum by the Raja of Jaipur. On the request of Richard Wellesley, 1st Marquess Wellesley, the Raja turned Ali over to the British on the condition that he neither be hanged nor be put in fetters. Ali surrendered to the British authorities in December 1799 and was placed in rigorous confinement at Fort William, Calcutta.

The colonial government complied with this: Ali spent the rest of life – 17 years – in an iron cage in Fort William in the Bengal Presidency. He was buried in the Muslim graveyard of Kasi Baghan.

== Children ==
- Mirza Jalaluddin Haidar Ali Khan Bahadur born 1798, married and got Issue
  - Nawab Mubarak ud-Daula, who moved to Ottoman Empire
- Mirza Muhammad Ali Khan
- Sahibzadi Saadatunnisa Begum

== Timeline ==
Preceded by Asaf ad-Dowla Amani	Nawab Wazir al-Mamalik of Oudh; 21 September 1797 – 21 January 1798	Succeeded by Yamin ad-Dowla Nazem al-Molk Sa`adat `Ali Khan II Bahadur

== Literature ==
- Baillie, Laureen (Hrsg.): Indian Biographical Archiv; München, ISBN 3-598-34104-0, Fiche 492
- Davis, John Francis (1795–1890); Vizier Ali Khan; or, The massacre of Benares: a chapter in British Indian history .. (1871) (Orig. 1844)
- Higginbotham, J. J.; Men Whom India has Known. 1874
- Ray, Aniruddha; Revolt of Vizir Ali of Oudh at Benares in 1799; in: Proceedings of the Indian History Congress, 49th Session, Karnatak University, Dharwad, 1988: S 331–338
- Kartoos by Habib Tanvir
