= Massacre of Benares =

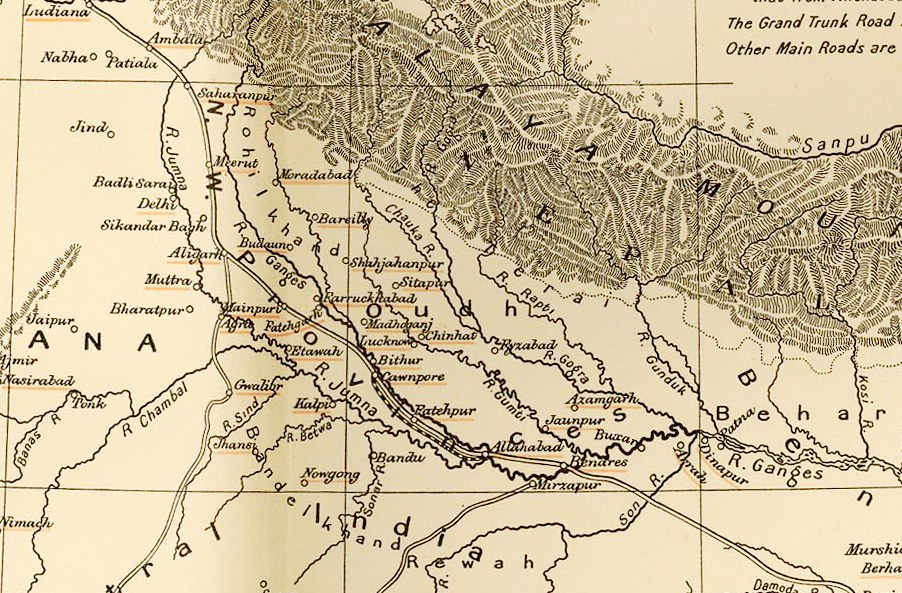
Oudh, on an 1857 map

The Massacre of Benares is the name given to the minor and unsuccessful insurrection of Wazir Ali Khan, deposed Nawab of Awadh, at Benares in northern India in 1799, in which five British East India Company officials and civilians were murdered. Wazir Ali's uprising resulted in his imprisonment for the remainder of his life.

== Background ==
Oudh State, the Kingdom of Oudh, or Awadh, was a princely state in the Awadh region of north-central India during the British Raj, occupying the plain of the Ganges and immediately south and west of Nepal. Its capital was Lucknow, one of the richest of the northern Indian cities. The British Resident in Lucknow, up until July 1796, was George Frederick Cherry; the role of the Resident was to gather intelligence and, to the extent possible, shape events such that they favoured the interests of the East India Company. Cherry excelled as a spy-master and was inevitably associated with, or interested in, the intrigues of the Nawab's court and state, to the extent that he was withdrawn to Benares in 1796 for his own safety having made sufficient enemies locally.

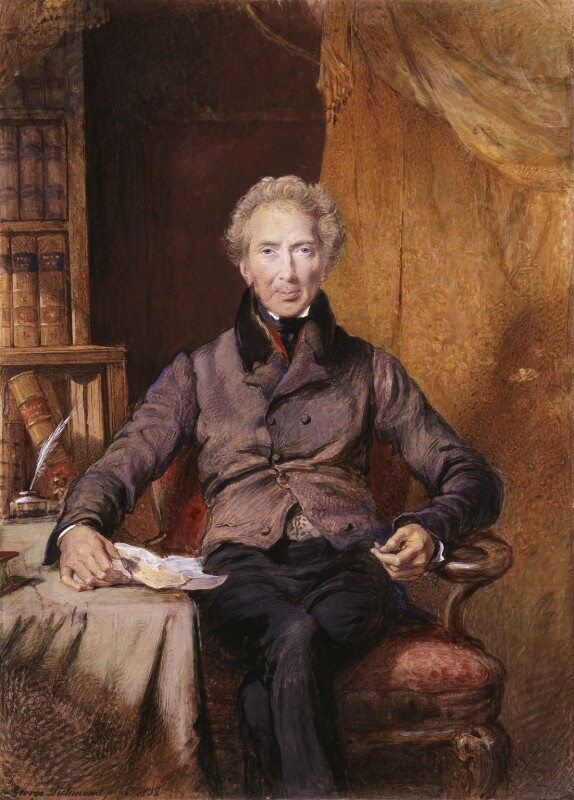
Sir John Shore, Governor-General of India

By September 1797, when Oudh's ruler, Asaf-ud-Daula, died, it was a vassal state to the British in the form of the East India Company, which more directly controlled all Indian territory surrounding Oudh. The British, under the Governor-Generalship of Sir John Shore, felt themselves 'compelled' to take a hand in the succession, the choice appearing to rest between Wazir Ali Khan, the adopted son of Asaf-ud-Daula, or his uncle, Saadat Ali Khan II, half-brother of Asaf-ud-Daula and lineal descendant of Shuja-ud-Daula, the Nawab preceding Asaf-ud-Daula. Initially satisfying themselves that Wazir Ali was the heir apparent, the British selected him as Nawab; but quickly came to regret their decision when it became plain that the 17-year old Ali did not intend to co-operate with British wishes. Notably, he demoted and isolated Zehseen Ali Khan, a minister who under Asaf-ud-Daula was identified as being sympathetic to the British; and he acted in a threatening fashion when Shore visited Lucknow.

Conveniently, within the first months of his reign, Almas Ali Khan, perhaps the second ranking individual in Oudh came forwards making allegations against Wazir Ali Khan; that there was something improper about his adoption - his mother having been bought by Asaf-ud-Daula - and that he was profligate and calculated to ruin the country. Almas Ali expressed apprehension - presumably to John Lumsden, Cherry's replacement - lest the Governor-General hear all of the details of Wazir Ali's conduct, and suggested that British troops, allied with the Begum, Asaf-ud-Daula's mother, would be sufficient to depose Wazir Ali. The British considered the matter and found that as both Almas Ali Khan and the Begum admitted the spurious claim of Wazir Ali, there could be 'no shadow of a pretext for objecting to the claim of Saadat Ali Khan on the grounds of right.

The East India Company concluded a treaty with Saadat Ali Khan - probably on very uneven terms, Saadat being in no position to negotiate terms - under which he would be elevated. On 21 January 1798 Saadat Ali Khan entered Lucknow with the Governor-General and an escort of British troops, where he was invested as Nawab by the Begum - under considerable duress from the Governor-General, who made it clear that if she refused, she would be undermined by him choosing another to perform the role. With little support from the court, which looked largely to the begum, and the antipathy of the British, it was clear to Wazir Ali that he lacked the means to resist, and so entered into an agreement to take a pension of a lac and a half, and retire to Benares, a town on the southern border of Oudh.

== Wazir Ali's insurrection ==
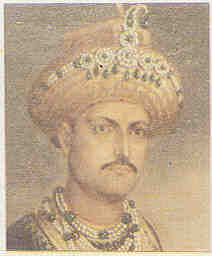
Wazir Ali Khan

The wisdom of requiring the deposed Wazir Ali to reside 'in the hallway of his own country' was called into question from the outset. The young Ali was far from satisfied with his lot, and indications before 1799, and evidence of later enquiries suggests he was plotting against the British and with a view to regaining his lost position. Nevertheless, it took until January 1799 before the British determined to require him to move to Calcutta. It fell to George Cherry, now resident at Benares, to manage Ali throughout 1798 and, when the Calcutta decision was made, to communicate it to him.

Ali appears to have been informed of his fate in the early part of January 1799, and his all of remonstrances fell on the deaf ears of the British, in the form of Cherry. Appearing to acquiesce to the situation, he gave it out that he would relocate on the 15 or 16 January. On 13 January Cherry was informed that Ali would visit him the following morning, and on the 14th Ali appeared at breakfast time, leading a more-or-less normal 200-strong entourage. Cherry escorted Khan and three supporters into his house, where Ali took the opportunity to complain loudly about his lot, to assert promises broken by the British, and to blame Cherry for failing to look after his interests. Then, in what looked like a choreographed movement, an associate, Waris Ali, restrained the sitting Cherry from behind his seat, Wazir Ali Khan struck Cherry with his sword, and Cherry was further struck by others of Ali's party. Cherry managed to struggle out of the house, but was quickly killed. Two of Cherry's colleagues were also killed: his secretary, Mr. Evans, was stabbed, escaped outside, and was shot whilst seeking to flee; Captain Conway, who resided with Cherry, arrived at the property and was killed by Wazir Ali's attendants.

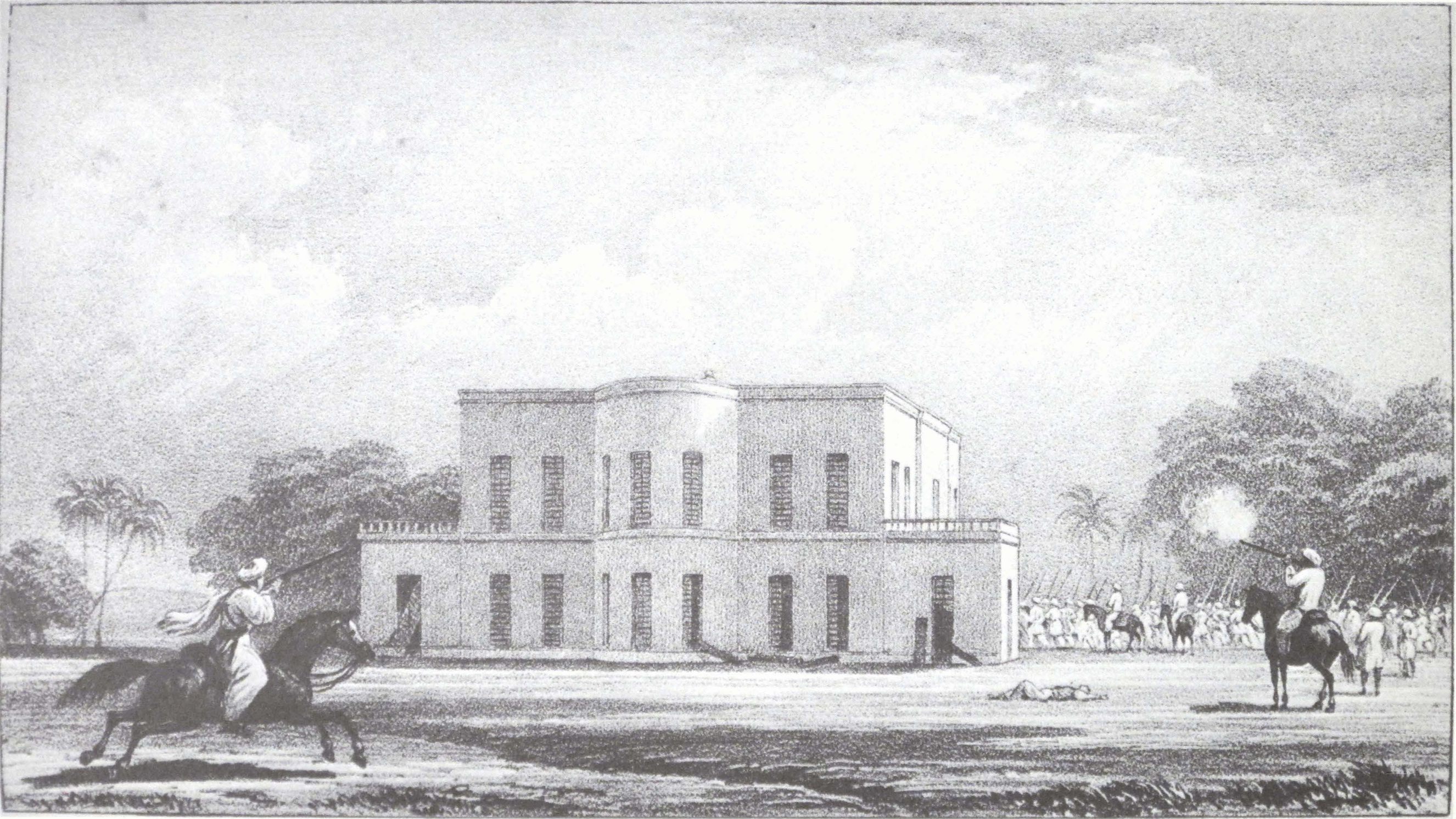
Wazir Ali's supporters attacking Samuel Davis's house

Wazir Ali and entourage next sought to attack the Magistrate of Lucknow, Samuel Davis; on their way they came across a civilian, the unfortunate Mr. Robert Graham, and cut him to pieces. Davis got brief warning of the imminent danger when Ali's followers opened fire on Davis's sentries, and managed to get his family up onto the terraced roof of his property, which was reached from a narrow staircase ascending through the ceiling. He had not time to gather weapons beyond a pike, but over the course of 90 minutes managed to fend off attempts by Ali's followers to gain access to the roof by judicious jabbing of anyone getting within a pike's-length. Wazir Ali appears within this timescale to have decided to move on to the centre of Benares, and Davis's house was eventually cleared by members of his Indian police force together with sepoys.

As news of events spread, the European population of the town hid themselves away as best they could, but Wazir Ali and supporters had little time to make mischief - though they managed to kill a Mr. Hill, a European shop-keeper, and set fire to a number of properties - before a Cavalry detachment under General Erskine arrived in the town at about 11am. Ali, with supporters, retired towards his fortified house, not before the loss of one of Erskine's troopers, who falling from his horse was hacked to death. Further immediate annoyance from Ali was curtailed by the arrival of infantry troops, although his men wounded a number of soldiers before falling back to the shelter of the garden his house, which was promptly besieged by Erskine's soldiers. Some further casualties arose as troops sought to regain control of the town, including the deaths of two of Erskine's orderlies.

Erskine now brought field artillery to bear on Ali's house, demolishing a defensive tower and doing other damage; but during the night of the 14–15 January, Ali, most of his horsemen and a number of foot soldiers escaped to the north. He spent the best part of a year hiding in forests on the slopes of the first rank of Himalayas to the north-east of Oudh, and unsettling the Gorakhpur area of Oudh. Ali's situation was bleak, not least his inability to forage sufficient resources to maintain his supporters, who faded away. Towards the end of the year he sought refuge with Pratap Singh of Jaipur, Rajah of Jaipur, who turned him over to the British authorities on condition Ali was not executed nor fettered. Ali was imprisoned for the remainder of his life.

Papers relating to the Massacre of Benares are held in the National Archives.
