= Trabolgan Holiday Village =

Holiday village in County Cork, Ireland

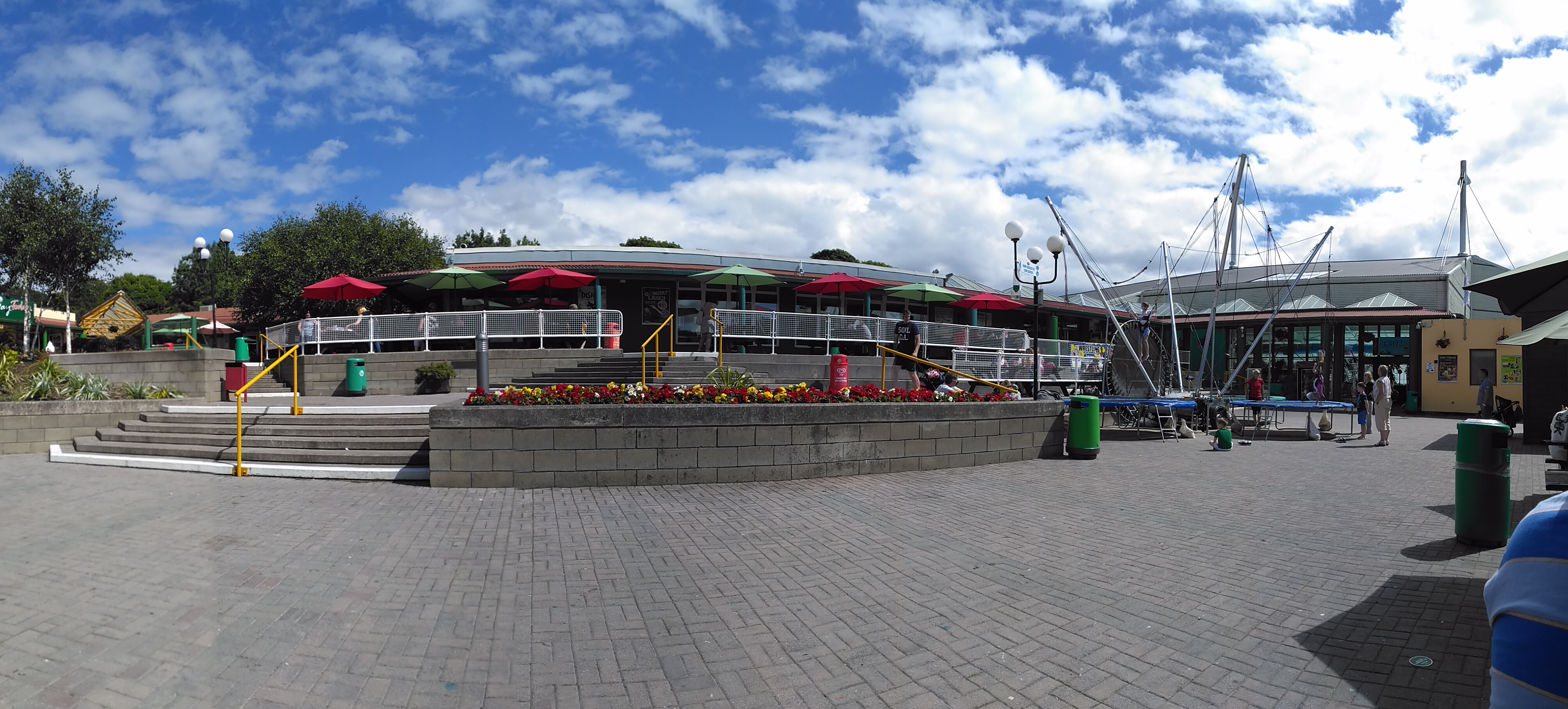
- Panorama of the amenities centre at Trabolgan Holiday Village

- Location within Ireland
- Location: Whitegate, Midleton, County Cork
- Coordinates: 51.798691°N 8.235810°W
- Subsequent names: Trabolgan
- Campus size: 140 acres (0.57 km^{2})
- Residences: 344
- Restaurants: 2
- Facilities: Indoor sports complex, an indoor swimming pool
- Established: 29 June 1985; 41 years ago
- Website: www.trabolgan.com

Trabolgan (Irish: Trá Bholgan, meaning 'strand of Bolgan') is a self catering holiday village on a 140-acre (0.57 km^{2}) site which was a former country estate in the civil parish of Trabolgan, County Cork, Ireland. The holiday camp was registered on 1 May 1984 and officially opened on 29 June 1985.

== History ==
=== Roche family ===
Trabolgan House was the seat of the Roche dynasty from the middle of the seventeenth-century up until 1880, when the family was forced to sell the house and most of the Trabolgan Estate. The head of the Roche family was elevated to the Peerage of Ireland as Baron Fermoy in 1856, when Edmond Burke Roche was created the 1st Baron Fermoy. Trabolgan House itself was largely rebuilt in the Georgian style circa 1780, with the house being significantly extended during the nineteenth-century.

=== Pontin's Trabolgan ===
Trabolgan was first opened as a holiday camp in 1948 by Pontin's, which built over 100 chalets, a dance hall and an outdoor swimming pool. The development was initially successful at attracting British holiday-makers.

=== Scoil na nÓg ===
Trabolgan was not successful in the longer term however, and it was converted into a boy's boarding school, Scoil na nÓg, operated by Gaedhealachas Teo from 1959 to 1973.

=== Trabolgan Holiday Village ===
In 1975, the Trabolgan estate was purchased by a Dutch Coal and Metal Industry Pension Fund and a small holiday development consisting of 30 houses, bar and clubhouse was opened in 1980, catering mainly for the continental market. The decision to extend the village to include a Main Centre and a wide range of facilities was taken in 1983, and building was completed in 1985; the village was officially opened on 29 June 1985 by Michael McNulty, the Director General of Bord Fáilte, and W.L. Van Leeuwen, the Director of Trabolgan Homes. The site changed hands several times, and was put up for sale in 2000 and purchased by Trevor Hemmings in 2002 to operate as Trabolgan Holiday Village.

== See also ==
- Imokilly, location within Ireland
- Trabolgan, a racehorse owned by Trevor Hemmings
