= Thomas Chambers (British politician) =

British politician

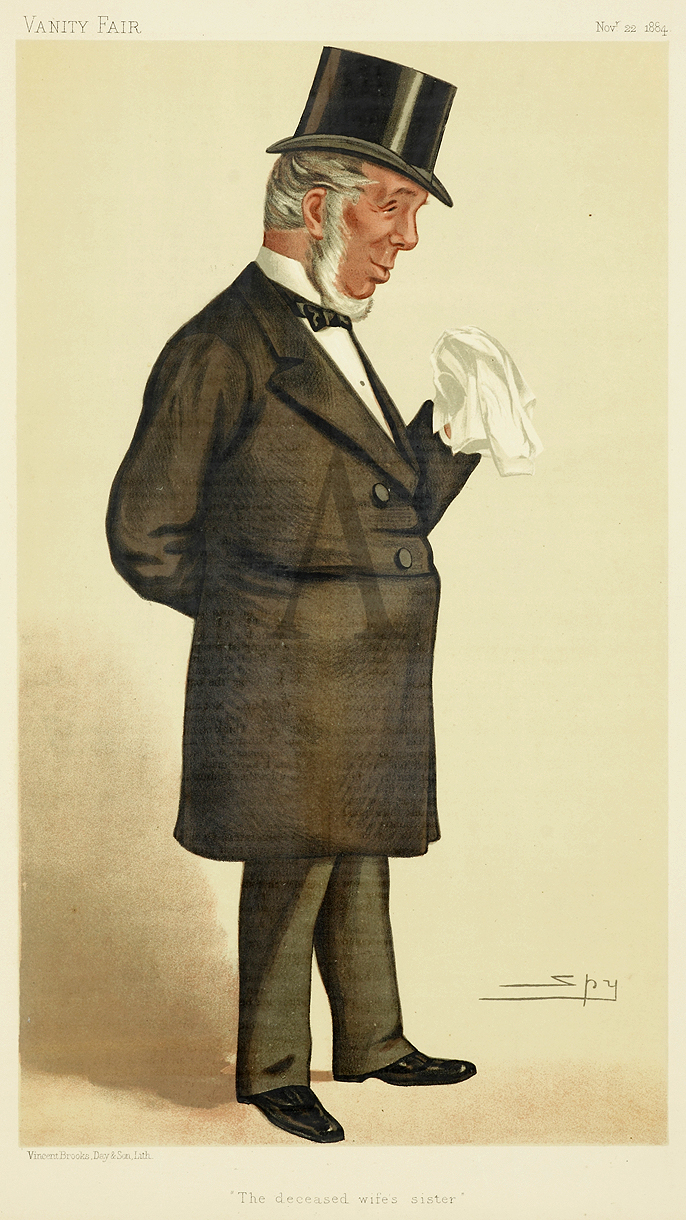
"The deceased wife's sister" Chambers as caricatured by Spy (Leslie Ward) in Vanity Fair, November 1884

Sir Thomas Chambers (17 December 1814 – 24 December 1891) was an English Liberal Party politician who sat in the House of Commons in two periods between 1852 and 1885.

== Life ==
Chambers was the son of Thomas Chambers of Hertford and his wife Sarah. He was educated at Clare College, Cambridge and called to the bar at Middle Temple in 1840.

In 1852 Chambers was elected member of parliament for Hertford but lost the seat in 1857. He was a Common Serjeant of London, from 1857 to 1878 and was a Lieutenant for the City of London. In 1861 he became a Q.C. and a Bencher of his Inn.

In 1865 Chambers was elected MP for Marylebone. He was knighted on 14 March 1872, and in 1872 became Treasurer of Middle Temple. He was President of the National Chamber of Trade from 1874 to around 1880, Recorder of London from 1878 to 1891 and Steward of Southwark in 1884. In parliament he was an advocate of the inspection of Convents and the legalisation of marriage with a deceased wife's sister. He held his seat at Marylebone until 1885.

Chambers died at the age of 77 and was buried at All Saints', Hertford.

== Family ==
Chambers married Diana White, who was the niece and adopted daughter of John Green of Hertford in 1851. They had three daughters:

1. Selina Mary (1852–1932) married Richard Knight Causton 10 Aug 1871 at St Mary's, Bryanston Square, London.
2. Diana Gertrude (1853–1923) Unmarried
3. Eleanor Mary Ann (1856–1929) married Sir Francis Roxburgh 24 Jan 1888 at St Mary's, Bryanston Square, London.

Parliament of the United Kingdom
Preceded by Lord Fermoy; Harvey Lewis	Member of Parliament for Marylebone; 1865 – 1885; With: Harvey Lewis to 1865; William Forsyth 1865–1874; Daniel Grant 1874–1885	Constituency divided
