= William Horne (British politician) =

British barrister and politician

Sir William Horne (2 December 1773 – 13 July 1860) was a British barrister and Liberal politician.

== Background and education ==
The son of the Reverend Thomas Horne of Chiswick, Horne studied law at Lincoln's Inn, being called to the bar in 1798.

== Legal and political career ==
In 1812, Horne was elected as a Whig Member of Parliament for Helston in Cornwall. He only served as the town's MP for a single term, and was unseated at the next election in 1818. On losing his seat, he returned to the law, becoming a king's counsel and bencher of Lincoln's Inn. He distinguished himself in the courts of chancery, and was briefly attorney-general to Queen Adelaide.

On 26 November 1830, Horne was appointed Solicitor General for England and Wales, at which time he was knighted. The office required him to hold a seat in parliament, and he was duly returned as member for Bletchingley on 18 February 1831. Parliament was dissolved in April of the same year, and in the ensuing general election he became member for Newton, Isle of Wight. His tenure in this seat was also brief, as it was abolished in the following year by the Great Reform Act. Horne became one of two MPs for the newly enfranchised parliamentary borough of Marylebone, London. In November of the same year he was promoted to Attorney General for England. Horne's opposition to capital punishment and ambitions to reform the courts led to conflict with the Lord Chancellor, Lord Brougham. He resigned from the office in February 1834, returning to private practice, and did not stand at the subsequent election in 1835. In 1839 he was appointed a Master in Chancery, an office he held until 1853.

== Family ==
Horne married Ann Hesse of Bedfordshire in 1799. They had a large family. Horne died at his London home, 49 Upper Harley Street, on 13 July 1860, aged 87.

Parliament of the United Kingdom
Preceded by Sir John St Aubyn; Lord Dufferin and Claneboye	Member of Parliament for Helston; 1812–1818; With: Hugh Hammersley	Succeeded by Lord James Townshend; Harrington Hudson
Preceded by Robert William Mills; Charles Tennyson	Member of Parliament for Bletchingley; 1831; With: Charles Tennyson	Succeeded by Hon. John Ponsonby; Charles Tennyson
Preceded by Hon. Charles Anderson-Pelham; Hudson Gurney	Member of Parliament for Newtown; 1831–1832; With: Hudson Gurney	Constituency abolished
New constituency	Member of Parliament for Marylebone; 1832–1835; With: Edward Portman 1832–1833; Sir Samuel Whalley 1833–1835	Succeeded by Sir Henry Bulwer; Sir Samuel Whalley
Legal offices
Preceded by Sir Edward Sugden	Solicitor General for England and Wales; 1830–1832	Succeeded by Sir John Campbell
Preceded by Sir Thomas Denman	Attorney General for England and Wales; 1832–1834	Succeeded by Sir John Campbell
