= Samuel Whalley =

British politician

Sir Samuel St. Swithin Burden Whalley (15 July 1799 – 3 February 1883) was a British Radical politician.

Born into a Lancashire family "of great antiquity", he was the son of Samuel Whalley of Weddington Hall, Warwickshire, and was educated at Clare Hall, Cambridge, gaining his bachelor's degree in 1822 and master's in 1825. In 1827 he was knighted, at which date he was living in Devon.

== Member of parliament for Marylebone ==
By the 1830s Whalley was living in the St John's Wood area of the parish of St Marylebone, a rapidly developing suburb of London. In 1832 Whalley sought to be nominated as a candidate for the newly enfranchised constituency of Marylebone, London. There was opposition to his candidacy as he was virtually unknown in the area. Questions were also raised about the manner in which he had obtained his knighthood, which was felt to have been in exchange for supporting the election of the Tory, Sir Nicholas Tindal as MP for Cambridge University.

Although he failed to be selected on this occasion, a by-election occurred in the following year when one of the sitting members of parliament resigned. He was successfully nominated, and he described himself as "not backed by either church or aristocracy but... the representative of industry". He promised to be a "pure and independent" member, and set out his political views: he was in favour of "a rigid system of economy in all branches of the state" and "a revision of the system of tithes, and the appropriation of the surplus revenues of the church to the education of the people". He also advocated the abolition of slavery, reduction of taxation, destruction of monopolies, a secret ballot, and a three-year parliamentary term.

The by-election was held on 20 March 1833, and Whalley secured a convincing win over his Tory opponent. He characterised his election as the "proud aristocracy of the country conquered by the will of the people". He was re-elected at the next general election in 1835. He was a strong supporter of the reforming Municipal Corporations Bill, attacking the attempts of the House of Lords to weaken the legislation.

In 1837 he was again returned as member for Marylebone. However, a petition was lodged against his election. In February 1838 an election court declared his election null and void, as he had not been qualified to be a candidate due to an "insufficient estate". Whalley did not contest another election.

== Marriages and death ==
Whalley was twice married. In 1830 he married Amelia Webb who died in 1835. His second marriage was to the Hon. Harriet Rose Trench, of Moate and Woodlawn, County Galway, Ireland in 1853. In his later years, he lived in Nice, France, where he died 3 February 1883.

Parliament of the United Kingdom
Preceded by Sir William Horne; Edward Portman	Member of Parliament for Marylebone; 1833–1838; With: Sir William Horne 1833–1835; Sir Henry Bulwer 1835–1837; Sir Benjamin Hall 1837–1838	Succeeded by The Lord Teignmouth; Sir Benjamin Hall
