= William Forsyth (barrister) =

Scottish lawyer and politician

William Forsyth QC, MP in 1875

William Forsyth QC (25 October 1812 – 26 December 1899) was a Scottish lawyer and Conservative Member of Parliament (MP).

== Early life and education ==
He was born at Greenock in Renfrewshire, son of merchant Thomas Forsyth, of Birkenhead, and Jane Campbell, daughter of John Hamilton, of Deer Park, near Greenock, from a landed gentry family of Scottish origin that had settled at Wilton, Herefordshire. His brother was the diplomat Sir Douglas Forsyth.

He was educated at Sherborne School and Trinity College, Cambridge, where he graduated B.A. in 1834. He was admitted at the Inner Temple in 1834 and called to the Bar in 1839.

== Career ==
Forsyth's Indemnity Act 1866
- Act of Parliament
- Parliament of the United Kingdom
- Long title: An Act to indemnify William Forsyth Esquire, One of Her Majesty's Counsel, from any penal Consequences which he may have incurred by sitting or voting as a Member of the House of Commons while holding the Office of Standing Counsel to the Secretary of State in Council of India.
- Citation: 29 & 30 Vict. c. 20
- Territorial extent: United Kingdom

Dates
- Royal assent: 30 April 1866
- Commencement: 30 April 1866 (Note: The Acts of Parliament (Commencement) Act 1793.)
- Repealed: 11 August 1875
Other legislation
Repealed by	Statute Law Revision Act 1875

Status: Repealed

Text of statute as originally enacted

He became a Bencher of the Inner Temple in 1857, Queen's Counsel in 1857 and Treasurer in 1872. He worked on the Midland Circuit. He was Standing Counsel to the Secretary of State for India 1859 to 1874. He was elected as MP for Cambridge at the 1865 general election but was unseated in April 1866, being disqualified as holding an office of profit under the Crown. He was later MP for Marylebone from 1874 to 1880.

He wrote a number of books on historical and legal subjects, including History of Trial By Jury (1852), Life of Cicero (1864), The Novels and Novelists of the Eighteenth Century (1871) and Hannibal in Italy (1872). He was also editor of several magazines. Forsyth was a member of the Canterbury Association from 1 May 1848 to 22 April 1850, when he resigned. In 1849, the chief surveyor of the Canterbury Association, Joseph Thomas, named Lake Forsyth for him.

He died at Knightsbridge, Middlesex, and was buried in Brookwood Cemetery in Surrey. His will probated at £18,667 in 1899.

== Family ==
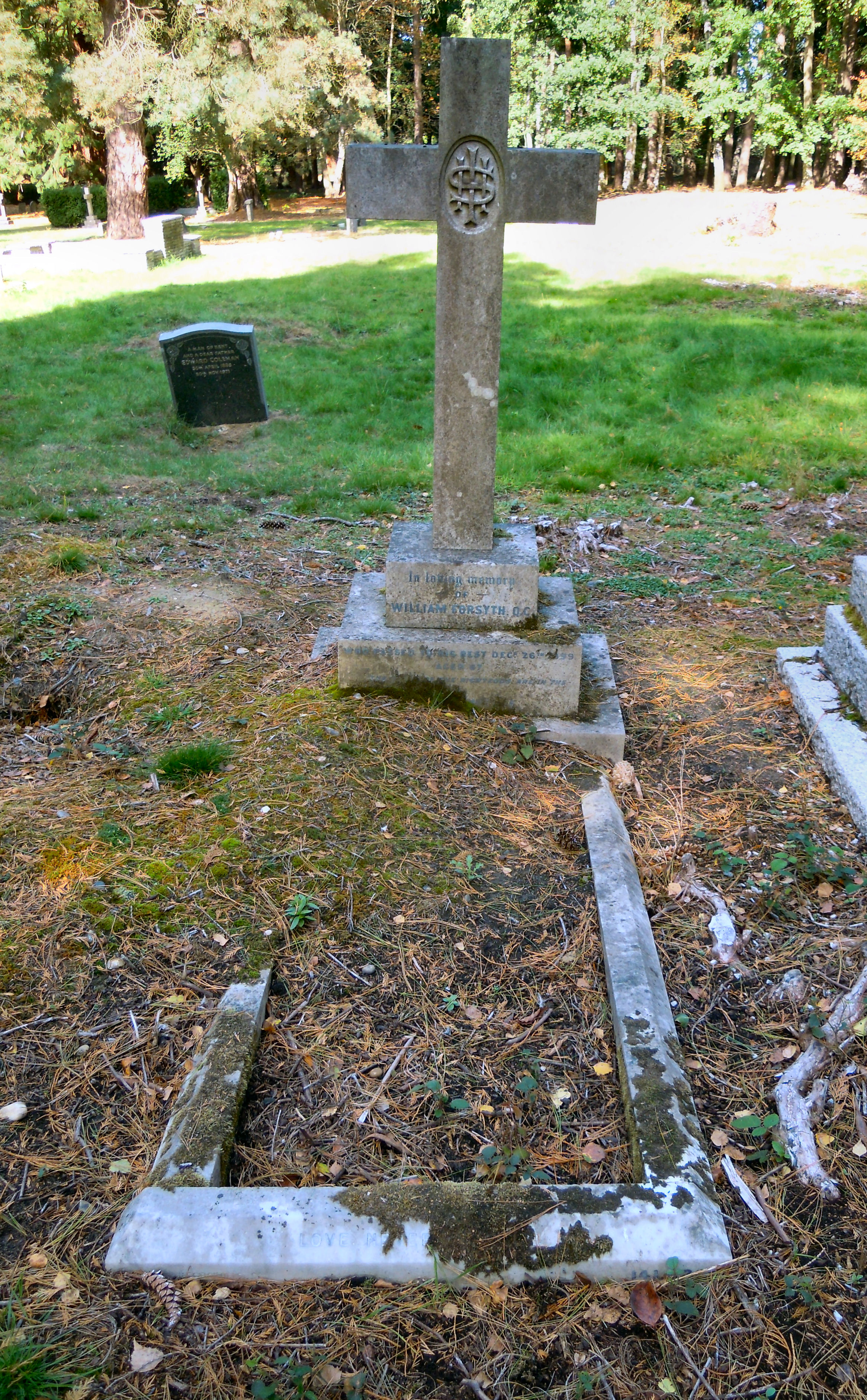
Forsyth's grave in Brookwood Cemetery

Forsyth was married twice. He was firstly married to Mary Lyall (daughter of George Lyall and Margaret Ann Edwards) (1819–1864), in 1843, by whom he had six children (two sons and four daughters). He remarried to Georgina Plummer in 1866; they also had children. His descendants and spouses of descendants include Doreen Knatchbull, Baroness Brabourne, James Stanhope, 7th Earl Stanhope and John Hamilton Wedgwood.

== Notes ==
Parliament of the United Kingdom
Preceded by Francis Powell; Kenneth Macaulay	Member of Parliament for Cambridge; 1865 – 1866; With: Francis Powell	Succeeded by Francis Powell; John Eldon Gorst
Preceded by Sir Thomas Chambers; Harvey Lewis	Member of Parliament for Marylebone; 1874 – 1880; With: Sir Thomas Chambers	Succeeded by Sir Thomas Chambers; Daniel Grant
