= Daniel Grant (politician) =

English printer and politician

Daniel Grant (26 September 1826 - ?) was an English printer and Liberal politician who sat in the House of Commons from 1880 to 1885.

Grant was the son of Captain Daniel Grant of South Shields. He was educated at the Upper School of the Royal Hospital Greenwich. He founded the printing firm of Grant and Co of Turnmill Street, Clerkenwell and was principal partner for many years. He was a member of the Sylvan Debating Club.

In 1868 and 1874 Grant stood unsuccessfully for parliament at Marylebone. At the 1880 general election he was elected one of two Members of parliament for Marylebone and held the seat until 1885. Following the Redistribution of Seats Act 1885 the old constituency of Marylebone was divided into a number of single-member constituencies. At the 1885 general election Grant was the Liberal candidate at Marylebone East, but was defeated by his Conservative opponent, Lord Charles Beresford.

Parliament of the United Kingdom
Preceded by William Forsyth; Thomas Chambers	Member of Parliament for Marylebone; 1880 – 1885; With: Thomas Chambers	Constituency divided
