= Marylebone (constituency) =

Parliamentary constituency in the United Kingdom, 1832–1885

- Former borough constituency for the House of Commons
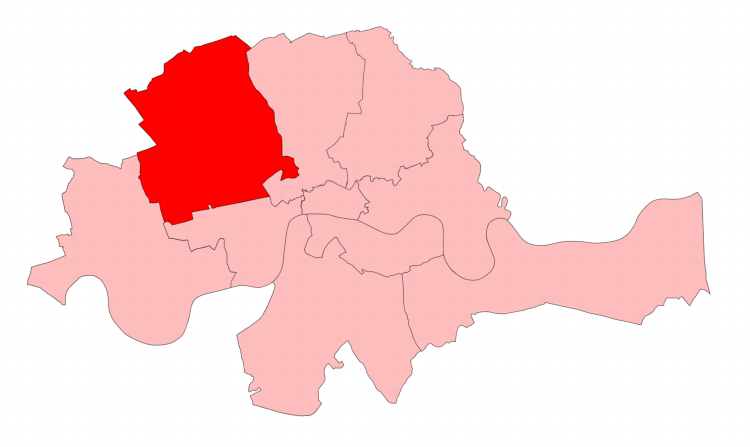
- The London urban seats including new, 1832, ones taking parts of Middlesex, Surrey and West Kent. Akin to the Metropolitan Board of Works Area (after 1889 the mainstay of the County of London)

1832–1885
- Seats: two
- Created from: Middlesex
- Replaced by: Marylebone East, Marylebone West, Paddington North, Paddington South, St Pancras East, St Pancras North, St Pancras South and St Pancras West

Marylebone was a parliamentary constituency in Middlesex, England from 1832 to 1885. The parliamentary borough formed part of the built up area of London, and returned two members to the House of Commons of the UK Parliament and was created under the Reform Act 1832. It was abolished by the Redistribution of Seats Act, 1885 which split it into 8 seats.

== Boundaries ==
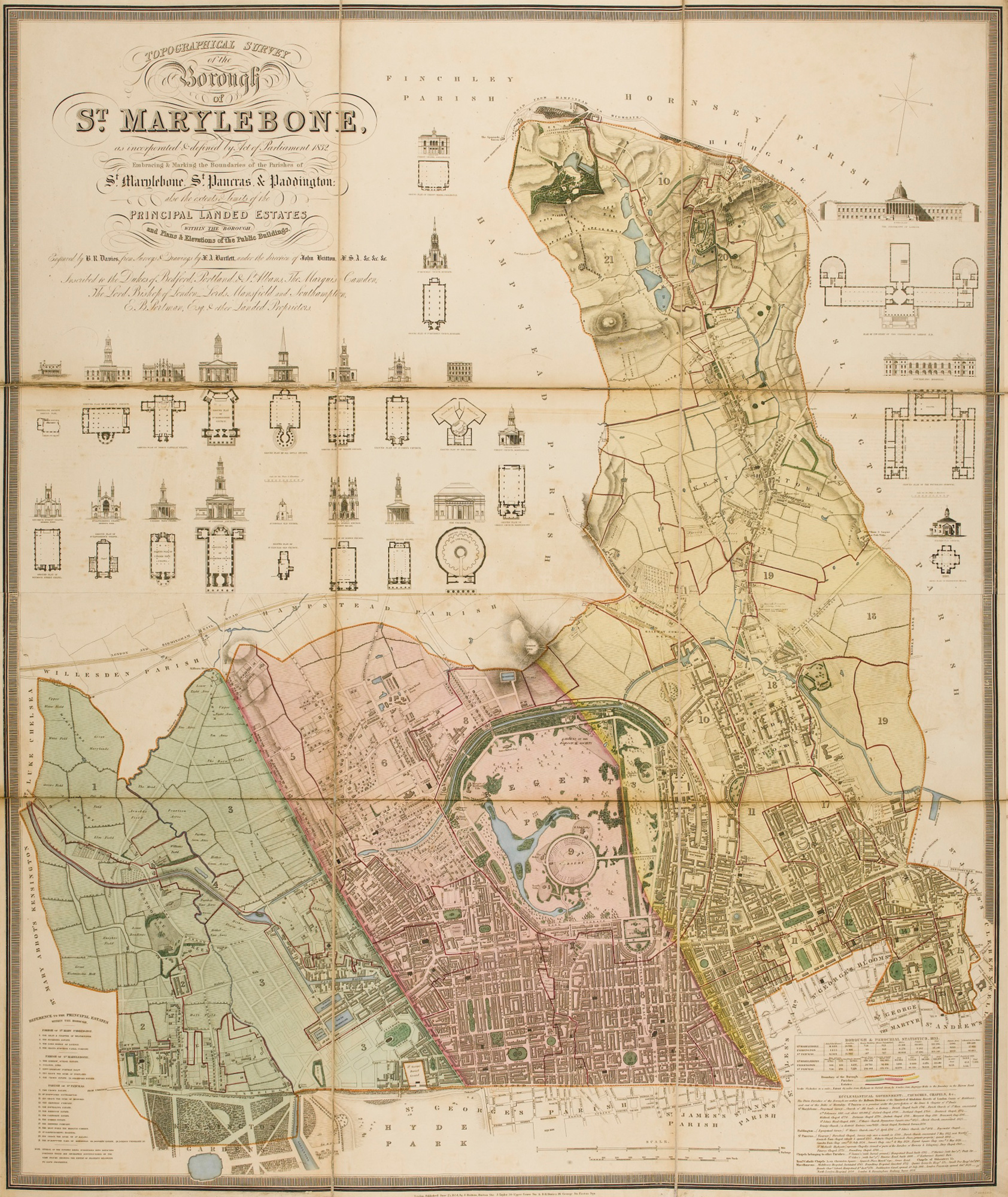
Marylebone in the Metropolitan area, showing boundaries used from 1868 to 1885.

Marylebone was one of five parliamentary boroughs in the metropolitan area of London enfranchised in 1832. The listed civil parishes (succeeding the parish vestries in all civil, secular matters) are respectively tinted pink, green and yellow on the inset map. The constituency was defined as consisting of three civil parishes in Middlesex:

- Saint Marylebone
- Paddington
- Saint Pancras

The commissioners appointed to fix its boundaries recommended that the part of Saint Pancras north of the Regent's Canal should be omitted thus remain in the parliamentary county of Middlesex being a still a largely rural projection. The inhabitants of St. Pancras, however, petitioned parliament for the inclusion of the entire parish, and this was accepted.

In 1885 the entity was split into eight new single-member divisions:

- Marylebone East
- Marylebone West
- Paddington North
- Paddington South
- St. Pancras East
- St. Pancras North
- St. Pancras South
- St. Pancras West.

== Members of Parliament ==
Election	First member	First party	Second member	Second party
1832	Edward Portman	Whig	Sir William Horne	Whig
1833 by-election	Sir Samuel Whalley ^{1}	Radical	Sir William Horne	Whig
1835	Sir Samuel Whalley ^{1}	Radical	Sir Henry Bulwer	Whig
1837	Sir Samuel Whalley ^{1}	Radical	Sir Benjamin Hall, Bt	Whig
1838 by-election	Charles Shore ^{2}	Conservative	Sir Benjamin Hall, Bt	Whig
1841	Sir Charles Napier	Radical	Sir Benjamin Hall, Bt	Whig
1847	Lord Dudley Stuart	Whig	Sir Benjamin Hall, Bt	Whig
1854 by-election	Hugh Fortescue	Whig	Sir Benjamin Hall, Bt	Whig
February 1859 by-election	Edwin James	Radical	Sir Benjamin Hall, Bt	Whig
1859	Edwin James	Liberal	Sir Benjamin Hall, Bt	Liberal
July 1859 by-election	Edwin James	Liberal	Edmond Roche ^{2}	Liberal
1861 by-election	Harvey Lewis	Liberal	Edmond Roche ^{2}	Liberal
1865	Harvey Lewis	Liberal	Sir Thomas Chambers	Liberal
1874	William Forsyth	Conservative	Sir Thomas Chambers	Liberal
1880	Daniel Grant	Liberal	Sir Thomas Chambers	Liberal
1885	constituency abolished			

Notes

- ^{1} Election of Whalley in 1837 declared void on petition, as he could not prove his eligibility.
- ^{2} A peer of Ireland.

== Elections ==
Turnout, in multi-member elections, is estimated by dividing the number of votes by two. To the extent that electors did not use both their votes, the figure given will be an underestimate.

Change is calculated for individual candidates, when a party had more than one candidate in an election or the previous one. When a party had only one candidate in an election and the previous one change is calculated for the party vote.

=== Elections in the 1830s ===
General election 1832: Marylebone (2 seats)
Party	Candidate	Votes	%	±%
Whig	Edward Portman	4,317	39.1	
Whig	William Horne	3,320	30.0	
Radical	Samuel Whalley	2,165	19.6	
Chartist	Thomas Murphy	913	8.3	
Radical	Leslie Grove Jones	316	2.9	
Majority		1,135	10.4	
Turnout		6,076	68.3	
Registered electors		8,901		
Whig win (new seat)				
Whig win (new seat)				

Portman resigned by accepting the office of Steward of the Chiltern Hundreds, causing a by-election.

By-election, 20 March 1833: Marylebone
Party	Candidate	Votes	%	±%
Radical	Samuel Whalley	2,869	48.7	+26.2
Tory	Henry Thomas Hope	2,055	34.9	New
Whig	Charles Murray †	791	13.4	−55.7
Chartist	Thomas Murphy	172	2.9	−5.4
Majority		814	2.2	N/A
Turnout		5,887	66.1	−2.2
Registered electors		8,901		
Radical gain from Whig		Swing	+41.0	

† Murray was the government-approved candidate, but withdrew from the contest prior to the completion of polling.

General election 1835: Marylebone (2 seats)
Party	Candidate	Votes	%	±%
Radical	Samuel Whalley	2,956	37.1	+17.5
Whig	Henry Bulwer	2,781	34.9	+4.2
Whig	William Horne	1,862	23.3	−6.7
Radical	Gilbert Ainslie Young	378	4.7	+1.8
Turnout		5,000	64.5	−3.8
Registered electors		7,752		
Majority		175	13.8	N/A
Radical gain from Whig		Swing	+9.4	
Majority		919	11.6	+1.2
Whig hold		Swing	−2.7	

General election 1837: Marylebone (2 seats)
Party	Candidate	Votes	%	±%
Whig	Benjamin Hall	3,512	31.2	−3.7
Radical	Samuel Whalley	3,350	29.8	−7.3
Conservative	Charles Shore	2,952	26.3	New
Radical	Gilbert Ainslie Young	764	6.8	+2.1
Whig	William Horne	662	5.9	−17.4
Turnout		7,057	65.1	+0.6
Registered electors		10,843		
Majority		162	1.4	−10.2
Whig hold		Swing	−0.6	
Majority		398	3.5	−10.3
Radical hold		Swing	+1.6	

Whalley's election was declared void on petition, due to him having insufficient estate to qualify, causing a by-election.

By-election, 3 March 1838: Marylebone
Party	Candidate	Votes	%	±%
Conservative	Charles Shore	4,166	51.3	+25.0
Whig	William Ewart	3,762	46.4	+9.3
Radical	Thomas Perronet Thompson	186	2.3	−34.5
Majority		404	4.9	N/A
Turnout		8,114	68.8	+3.7
Registered electors		11,799		
Conservative gain from Radical		Swing	+29.7	

=== Elections in the 1840s ===
General election 1841: Marylebone
Party	Candidate	Votes	%	±%
Whig	Benjamin Hall	4,661	28.9	−8.2
Radical	Charles Napier	4,587	28.5	−8.1
Conservative	Benjamin Bond Cabbell	3,410	21.2	+8.1
Conservative	James Hamilton	3,383	21.0	+7.9
Chartist	William Villiers Sankey	61	0.4	New
Turnout		8,234	71.2	+6.1
Registered electors		11,570		
Majority		74	0.4	−1.0
Whig hold		Swing	−8.1	
Majority		1,177	7.3	+3.8
Radical hold		Swing	−8.1	

General election 1847: Marylebone
Party	Candidate	Votes	%	±%
Whig	Dudley Stuart	5,367	35.7	N/A
Whig	Benjamin Hall	5,343	35.5	+6.6
Conservative	James Hamilton	3,677	24.4	+3.2
Radical	William Shee	662	4.4	−24.1
Chartist	Robert Owen	1	0.0	−0.4
Majority		4,705	31.3	N/A
Majority		1,666	11.1	+10.7
Turnout		7,525 (est)	48.0 (est)	−23.2
Registered electors		15,662		
Whig gain from Radical		Swing	+15.4	
Whig hold		Swing		

=== Elections in the 1850s ===
General election 1852: Marylebone
Party	Candidate	Votes	%	±%
Whig	Benjamin Hall	Unopposed		
Whig	Dudley Stuart	Unopposed		
Registered electors		19,710		
Whig hold				
Whig hold				

Hall was appointed President of the General Board of Health, requiring a by-election.

By-election, 16 August 1854: Marylebone
Party	Candidate	Votes	%	±%
Whig	Benjamin Hall	Unopposed		
Whig hold				

Stuart's death caused a by-election.

By-election, 20 December 1854: Marylebone
Party	Candidate	Votes	%	±%
Whig	Hugh Fortescue	6,919	62.4	N/A
Whig	Jacob Bell	4,166	37.6	N/A
Majority		2,753	24.8	N/A
Turnout		11,085	55.7	N/A
Registered electors		19,892		
Whig hold				

Hall was appointed First Commissioner of Works, requiring a by-election.

By-election, 28 July 1855: Marylebone
Party	Candidate	Votes	%	±%
Whig	Benjamin Hall	Unopposed		
Whig hold				

General election 1857: Marylebone
Party	Candidate	Votes	%	±%
Whig	Benjamin Hall	Unopposed		
Whig	Hugh Fortescue	Unopposed		
Registered electors		20,851		
Whig hold				
Whig hold				

Fortescue resigned, causing a by-election.

By-election, 25 February 1859: Marylebone
Party	Candidate	Votes	%	±%
Radical	Edwin James	6,803	67.0	N/A
Radical	Frederick Romilly	3,354	33.0	N/A
Majority		3,449	34.0	N/A
Turnout		10,157	59.6	N/A
Registered electors		20,490		
Radical gain from Whig				

General election 1859: Marylebone
Party	Candidate	Votes	%	±%
Liberal	Edwin James	5,029	46.6	N/A
Liberal	Benjamin Hall	4,663	43.2	N/A
Conservative	Edward Stanley	1,102	10.2	New
Majority		3,561	33.0	N/A
Turnout		5,948 (est)	29.0 (est)	N/A
Registered electors		20,490		
Liberal hold				
Liberal hold				

Hall succeeded to the peerage, becoming Lord Llanover and causing a by-election.

By-election, 7 July 1859: Marylebone
Party	Candidate	Votes	%	±%
Liberal	Edmond Roche	4,219	55.4	N/A
Liberal	William Lyon	2,318	30.4	N/A
Liberal	Lothian Sheffield Dickson	1,083	14.2	N/A
Majority		1,901	25.0	−8.0
Turnout		7,620	37.2	+8.2
Registered electors		20,490		
Liberal hold				

=== Elections in the 1860s ===
James' resignation caused a by-election.

By-election, 19 April 1861: Marylebone
Party	Candidate	Votes	%	±%
Liberal	Harvey Lewis	5,269	51.1	N/A
Conservative	Robert Carden	2,612	25.3	+15.1
Liberal	George Wingrove Cooke	2,369	23.0	N/A
Liberal	John Clark Marshman	65	0.6	N/A
Liberal	Harper Twelvetrees	1	0.0	N/A
Majority		2,657	25.8	−7.2
Turnout		10,316	49.1	+20.1
Registered electors		21,022		
Liberal hold		Swing		

General election 1865: Marylebone
Party	Candidate	Votes	%	±%
Liberal	Harvey Lewis	7,159	40.3	N/A
Liberal	Thomas Chambers	6,488	36.5	N/A
Liberal	Edmond Roche	4,121	23.2	N/A
Majority		2,367	13.3	−19.7
Turnout		8,884 (est)	37.7 (est)	+8.7
Registered electors		23,588		
Liberal hold		Swing	N/A	
Liberal hold		Swing	N/A	

General election 1868: Marylebone
Party	Candidate	Votes	%	±%
Liberal	Harvey Lewis	9,782	29.8	−10.5
Liberal	Thomas Chambers	9,444	28.7	−7.8
Liberal	Humphry Sandwith	5,591	17.0	N/A
Liberal	Daniel Grant	4,058	12.3	N/A
Conservative	Thomas Parkyns	3,989	12.1	New
Majority		3,853	11.7	−1.6
Turnout		18,427 (est)	51.8 (est)	+14.1
Registered electors		35,575		
Liberal hold		Swing		
Liberal hold		Swing		

=== Elections in the 1870s ===
General election 1874: Marylebone
Party	Candidate	Votes	%	±%
Conservative	William Forsyth	9,849	37.5	+25.4
Liberal	Thomas Chambers	8,251	31.4	+2.7
Liberal	Daniel Grant	7,882	30.0	+17.7
Liberal	Thomas Hughes	294	1.1	N/A
Majority		9,555	36.4	N/A
Majority		7,588	1.4	−10.3
Turnout		18,063 (est)	58.8 (est)	+7.0
Registered electors		30,740		
Conservative gain from Liberal		Swing	+7.6	
Liberal hold		Swing	−11.4	

=== Elections in the 1880s ===
General election 1880: Marylebone
Party	Candidate	Votes	%	±%
Liberal	Daniel Grant	14,147	27.2	−2.8
Liberal	Thomas Chambers	14,003	27.0	−4.4
Conservative	Charles Allanson-Winn	11,890	22.9	+4.1
Conservative	Frederick Seager Hunt	11,888	22.9	+4.1
Majority		2,113	4.1	N/A
Turnout		25,964 (est)	73.1 (est)	+14.3
Registered electors		35,535		
Liberal gain from Conservative		Swing	−3.5	
Liberal hold		Swing	−4.3	

- Constituency abolished (1885)
