= Benjamin Hall, 1st Baron Llanover =

British politician and reformer

The Right Honourable Lord Llanover of Llanover and Abercarn PC
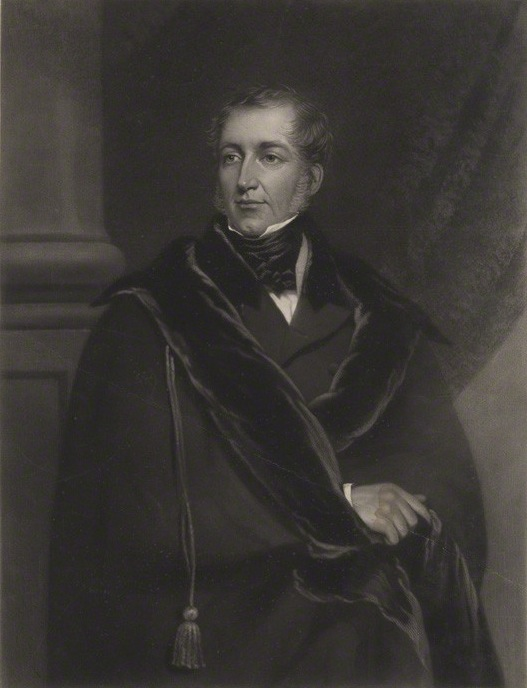

First Commissioner of Works
- In office 21 July 1855 – 21 February 1858
- Monarch: Queen Victoria
- Prime Minister: Viscount Palmerston
- Preceded by: Sir William Molesworth
- Succeeded by: Lord John Manners

President of the Board of Health
- In office 14 October 1854 – 13 August 1855
- Monarch: Queen Victoria
- Prime Minister: The Earl of Aberdeen; Viscount Palmerston
- Preceded by: New office
- Succeeded by: William Cowper

Member of the Privy Council
- In office 14 November 1854 – 22 July 1856
- Monarch: Queen Victoria

Lord Lieutenant of Monmouthshire
- In office 9 November 1861 – 27 April 1867
- Monarch: Queen Victoria
- Preceded by: Capel Hanbury Leigh
- Succeeded by: Henry Somerset, 8th Duke of Beaufort

Deputy Lord Lieutenant of Monmouthshire
- In office Unknown – 8 November 1861
- Monarch: Queen Victoria

Sheriff of Monmouthshire
- In office 1826
- Monarch: William IV
- Preceded by: James Proctor of Chepstow
- Succeeded by: William Addams Williams

Personal details
- Born: 8 November 1802 14 Upper Gower Street, London, England
- Died: 27 April 1867 (aged 64) 9 Great Stanhope Street, Mayfair, Middlesex, England
- Resting place: St Bartholomew's Churchyard, Llanover, Monmouthshire, Wales
- Party: Whig 1831-1859 / Liberal 1859-1867
- Spouse: Augusta Waddington (m. 1823)
- Education: Christ Church, Oxford

Benjamin Hall, Baron Llanover (8 November 1802 – 27 April 1867) was a Whig / Liberal politician and social, church, health and local government reformer who served in the House of Commons from 1831 until his elevation to the peerage in 1859. As President of the Board of Health in 1854–1855 he was a minister in the Cabinet and thereafter occupied the non-Cabinet position of First Commissioner of Public Works until 1858. In 1859 he was made a Peer as Lord Llanover of Llanover and Abercarn and served in the House of Lords until his death in 1867. He was a Minister under Lords Aberdeen and Palmerston and was a member of the Privy Council.

He was a prominent reformer whose primary focus in parliamentary debates was on church reform, local government and sanitation. He was the United Kingdom's first Minister of Health, playing an import role in the development of modern systems for the management of health and sanitation in London and later, as First Commissioner for Works, established the Metropolitan Board of Works, the first metropolis-wide government for London. He also oversaw the completion of the new Houses of Parliament and is today chiefly remembered as the person after whom Big Ben, the largest bell in its Elizabeth Tower, is named.

== Early life ==
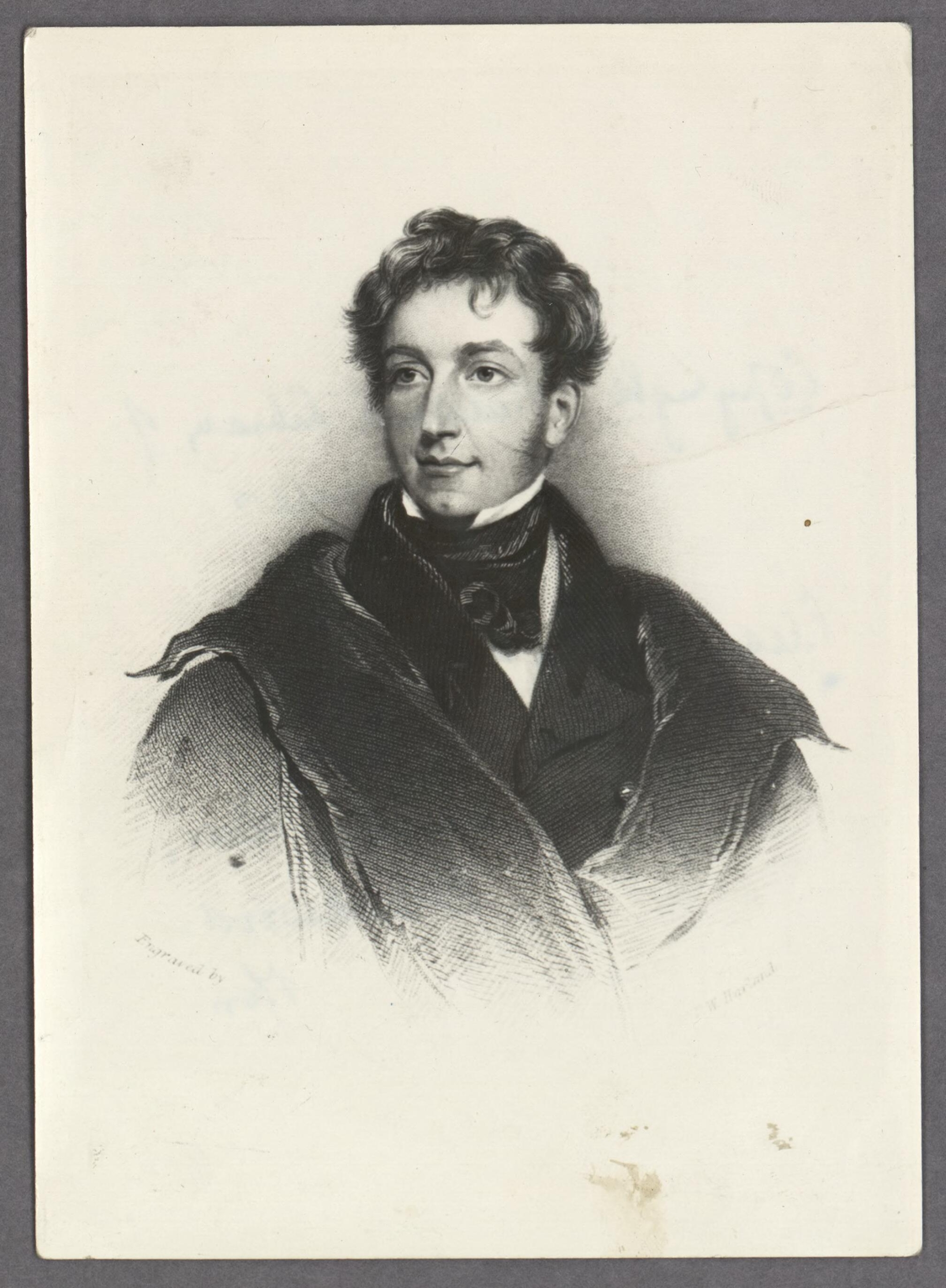
Benjamin Hall, 1841

Lord Llanover was the eldest son of Benjamin Hall, a Welsh ironmaster and Member of Parliament, and Charlotte, the daughter of Richard Crawshay, a prominent ironmaster and pioneer of the Industrial Revolution in Wales and, in his time, one of the wealthiest men in the United Kingdom. When Hall was five, his parents came to live in the Abercarn estate. The estate included two properties which were close to the river, a manor-house beside it and a small Georgian house on the wooded hill above it. Fraser (1962) documented about Hall's son in the estate: 'Here young Benjamin developed the brilliant markmanship, for which he was afterwards noted. Here, too, he became an accomplished horseman and whip, and learned to be a skilful angler, for there was salmon and trout fishing in the Ebbw, the Afon Gwyddon, the Afon Carn, and other tributory streams.

Hall attended a preparatory school (location unknown) and, at the age of 11, in Westminster School, London, in which life was 'unbelievably rough'. The pupils slept and worked in a long room which were heated by three open fires, which is where the distinction between juniors and seniors came into play - the seniors sat closed to the fires, while excluding the juniors. Also 'a junior's life was one of domestic drudgery and even servitude.' After six years Hall left Westminster School and in 1820 entered Christ Church, Oxford, from which he matriculated Christ Church, Oxford in 1820. (Note: Hall met Augusta Waddington of Llanover House because their families 'were on intimate terms at least as early as 1815.' (Fraser 1962a) However, the young couple needed to wait until Hall came of age before they could marry, which they did on 4 December 1822. (Fraser 1962a) Initially the couple lived in rented accommodation in the area of Newport. But upon the death of his father-in-law in 1828, they moved to Llanover. (Gurden-Williams 2008))

Thereafter he travelled in the United Kingdom and Europe and in 1826, at the age of only 24, served a year in the ceremonial role of Sheriff of Monmouthshire. During his travels he visited New Lanark, the model settlement and social experiment managed by Robert Owen, a philanthropist and social reformer. The visit is said to have influenced Hall's management of his own estates in Wales and his general views on the direction of social reform. Upon his return he took up the oversight of his estates at Llanover and Abercarn and served as a Magistrate. From the time of his marriage to Augusta Waddington in 1823, and under her influence, he also became interested in the revival of the Welsh language and culture, a cause the couple championed throughout their lives.

== Member of Parliament for Monmouth Boroughs and Marylebone ==
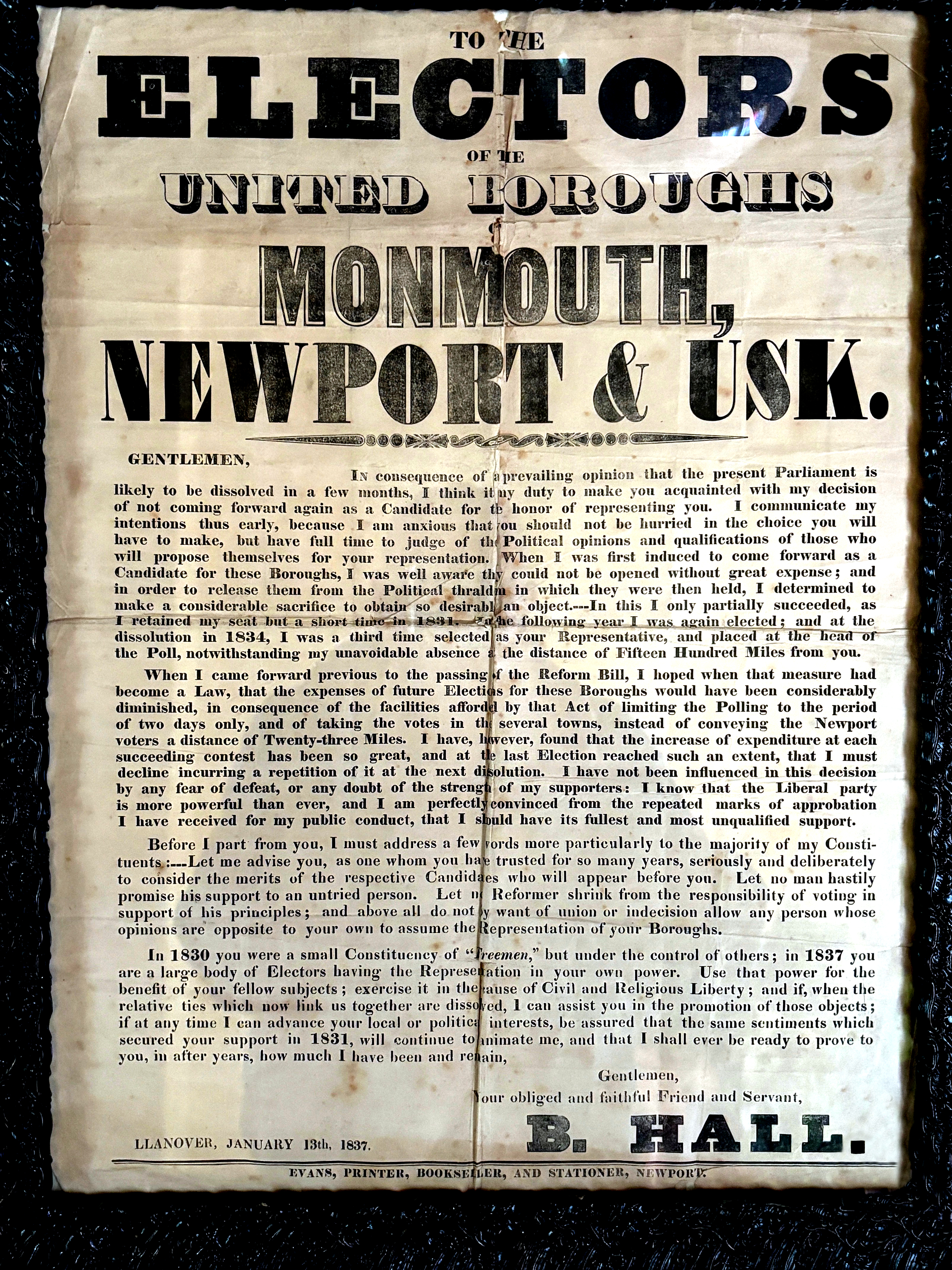
1837 election poster

In 1830 he entered politics, standing for election to the Monmouth Boroughs seat in Parliament. In so doing he took on the powerful and conservative Somerset family, headed by the Duke of Beaufort, which had since the time of Henry the VIII dominated Monmouthshire politics and controlled the seat in the House of Commons. At the time Monmouth Boroughs was held by the Marquis of Worcester, son and heir to the Duke. In the General Election of April–June 1831 Hall took the seat from Lord Worcester. His platform was pro-reform against a sitting MP who had publicly announced his opposition to the Reform Bill which Hall, in his first actions in the House of Commons, supported during its first and second readings in June and July 1831. However, Lord Worcester disputed the loss of his seat on the grounds of wrongful appointment of new burgesses in Newport who had voted in the election and, following an investigation by a committee of the House, he was reinstated as MP for Monmouth in July 1831, with Hall losing his seat.

In the election of December 1832 he again contested the Borough of Monmouth against Lord Worcester whom he once more defeated. He was reelected in January 1835, this time surviving another petition contesting the validity of his support. For the election of 1837 he switched his seat to the Marylebone constituency in London which he continued to represent until his elevation to the peerage in 1857.

As an MP Hall was a noted reformer focusing particularly on social issues and reform of the church and local government. He was also an early opponent of the death penalty and in his first years in Parliament supported the passing of the Slavery Abolition Act 1833.

=== Religious tolerance and reform of the established church ===
Although an Anglican, he was known for his tolerance of other faiths and defence of the rights of Catholics, Jews and dissenters at a time when such views were not held by the majority. He had a reputation for taking up such causes in Parliament, criticising what he believed to be the failings of the leadership of the established church and was an outspoken proponent of church reform. His attitudes and the reasons for his reputation as a vehement critic of the Church are well reflected in a speech delivered during an 1850 debate on remuneration and housing of the Anglican clergy, also published as a pamphlet under the title "A letter to the Archbishop of Canterbury on the state of the Church". In his speech and pamphlet he emphasised the disparities in stipends, where some bishops received over £50,000 per year while the lower clergy were paid as little is £40 per annum, and a situation where nearly £144,000 had been spent on bishops palaces with only £5,295 allocated for housing of what he called the "working clergy".

In this same debate, he dealt with what he regarded as the many other abuses of the considerable property holdings of the church and how they were used to enrich senior clergy rather than being applied to religious purposes. Other issues covered included nepotism in church appointments, non-residence of clergy in their parishes and pluralism, a practice whereby a clergyman was appointed to more than one parish, receiving stipends from each and then employing curates to serve in the parishes in which he did not reside, pocketing the difference between income from the 'living' and the lower wages he paid to curates.

As a promoter of Welsh culture and language, he also campaigned for the appointment of Welsh speaking Anglican clergy and bishops in Wales and for Welsh Bishops to be resident in their diocese.

He also spoke out against the practice of barring Jewish MPs from taking their seats because they objected to taking the oath of allegiance due to its wording requiring them to acknowledge being Christian.

As himself the grandson of a senior clergyman, Rev Dr Benjamin Hall (1742–1825), a Canon in and Chancellor of Llandaff Cathedral, many of his views on the church would have been anathema to his grandfather who was a substantial pluralist who simultaneously held three livings and two prebendaries, earning a handsome income from distant parishes that he could rarely if ever have visited.

=== Chartism and Irish unrest ===
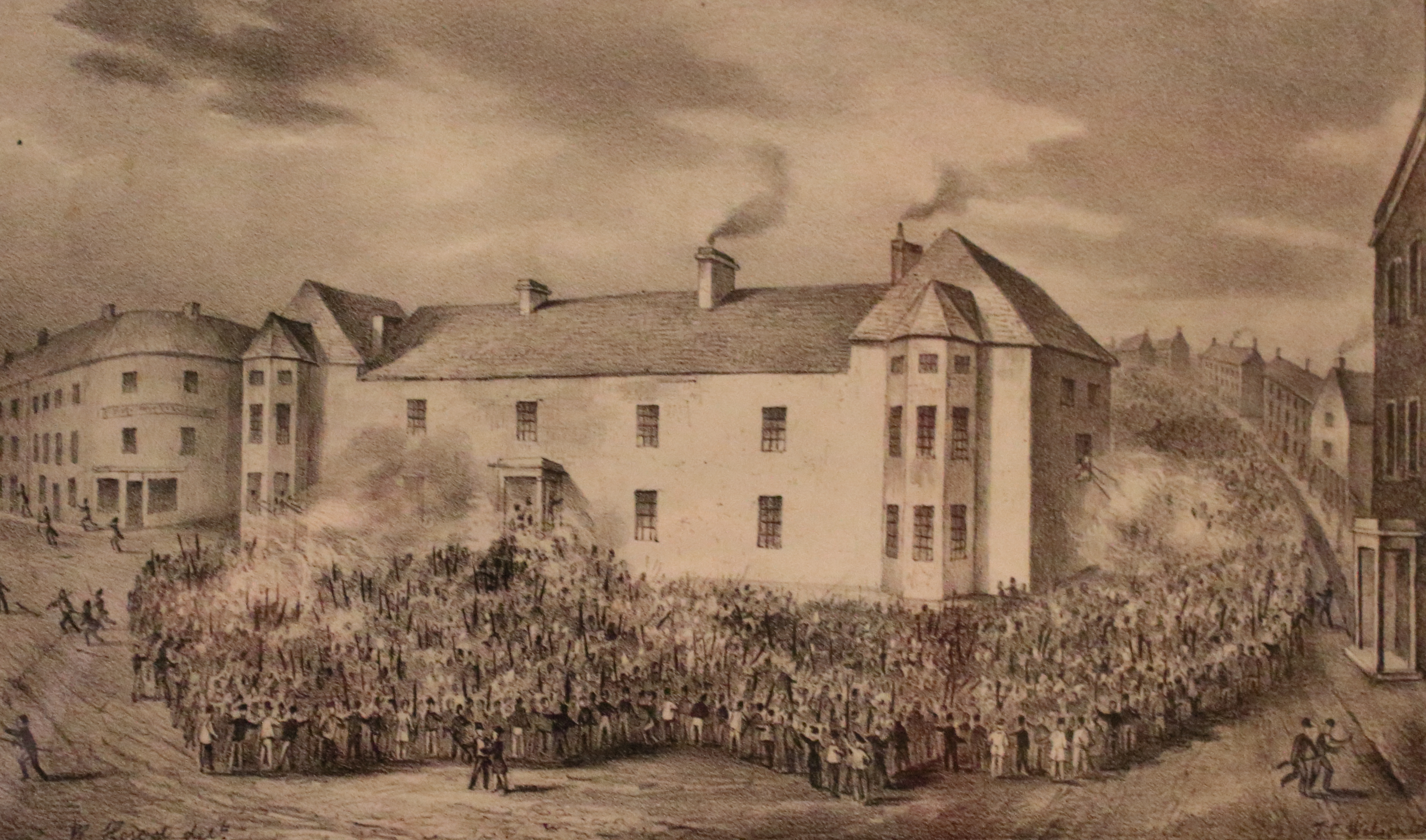
Scene from the Newport Rising in 1839

While a critic of the Chartists and their agenda, following the Chartist unrest of 1839, he showed understanding and sympathy for the underlying causes of the discontent, but no support for acts of violent rebellion. He was one of the few to speak in support of John Frost, the leader of the Newport Rising, during his 1840 trial for high treason.

By the time of the European revolutions of 1848, which in the United Kingdom manifested themselves through further Chartist unrest and the Young Ireland rebellion, he remained firmly opposed to violence, condemning the leaders of the Irish unrest as maniacs and propagators of "falsehood and hypocrisy" and those of the Chartists as "contemptible and hateful".

In June 1852 he was involved in an incident in the House of Commons where he was assaulted by the Irish Chartist MP Feargus O'Connor.

=== The Corn Laws and famine in Ireland ===
From the 1830s up to the time of their repeal in 1846, and despite being a large landholder, he opposed the Corn Laws which protected agricultural interests, but led to higher food prices in urban areas. He was a member of the Anti–Corn Law League which campaigned for repeal of the laws. On the matter of relief for Ireland during the course of the Irish Famine, which was exacerbated by the impact of the Corn Laws, he campaigned hard for Irish landlords to be taxed in the same way as their English counterparts and generally to equitably contribute to famine relief. He introduced a private member's bill on 17 March 1848, to extend the existing income tax to Ireland. George Moore, MP for famine-stricken Mayo, spoke against it. Moore referred to a letter he had received from a gentleman in the Clifton district of County Galway: 'The workhouse has become a murderous bastille, the deaths being thirty-six in a week: yet hundreds of wretched creatures were wandering about the streets, stretched by the walls, or squatting beneath doors. ... He had seen one woman, who had died in the streets with her breast eaten out by dogs!... From such a state of things the hon. Gentleman the Member for Marylebone proposed to extract his income-tax.' Hall's bill received the support of 130 MPs but was successfully opposed by 218.

=== Local government and sanitary services ===
From the early 1850s, he started to raise matters concerning local government, in particular the need to improve sanitation and the efficiency of the governance of London. In 1850 he commenced his criticism of the Corporation of London which, unlike municipal authorities in other large cities, had been exempted from the provisions of the Municipal Corporations Act 1835. Reform of the corporation was his major focus over the following period. In March 1853 he gave notice in Parliament of his intention to introduce a bill to reform the London Corporation, something he eventually achieved during his tenure as First Commissioner for Public Works. This threat appears to have encouraged the government to set up a commission to investigate reform of London's system of government.

During debate in the Commons on the Public Health Bill in 1854 he was a vocal critic of the management and operations of the Board of Health, the instrument set up by the Public Health Act 1848, and in particular the conduct of the leading commissioner, fellow social reformer, Edwin Chadwick. This criticism focused on the failure of the Public Health Act to provide a significant role for local government and the side-lining by Chadwick and the third Commissioner, Dr Thomas Southwood Smith, of the First Commissioner of Works, who represented the government on the Board. He was particularly concerned about the way in which Chadwick and Southwood Smith set a programme that frequently put the Board at odds with local government and how, in his opinion, this made it ineffective.

=== Baronet ===
Following publication of Queen Victoria's Coronation Honours List on 16 August 1838, he was made a Baronet in the style of "Sir Benjamin Hall of Llanover Court, Monmouth".

== President of the Board of Health ==
After the passing of the Public Health Bill into law in August 1854 he was appointed President of a reconstituted Board of Health. Previously it had nominally fallen under the First Commissioner for Public Works, but the changes of 1854 expanded the number of Commissioners and created the position of "President", giving the Board equal status to bodies such as the Board of Trade which were also committees of the Privy Council and whose presidents were members of the Cabinet. The President of the Board of Health was therefore a Cabinet Minister, making Benjamin Hall the United Kingdom's first 'Minister of Health', a title by which he was also referred to.

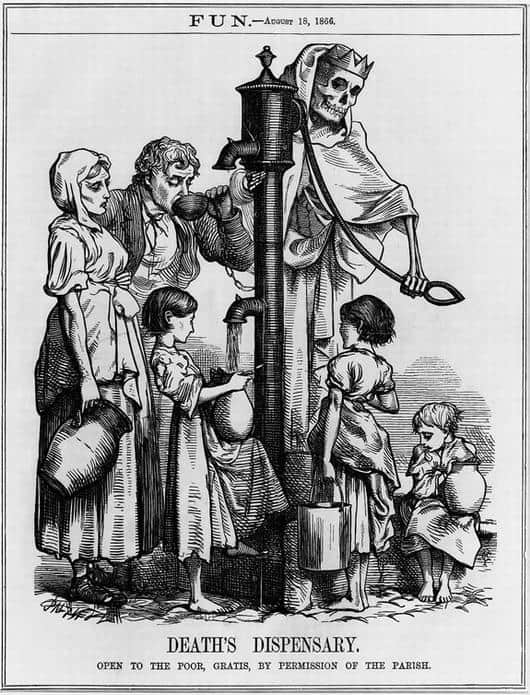
Public pumps as the agent for the waterborne spread of cholera during the 1866 London epidemic

Very shortly after his appointment there was a new and serious outbreak of cholera in the Broad Street neighbourhood of Soho in London that spread to other parts of the city. Unusually for someone in his position, he made house to house inspections of affected areas in order to fully understand the situation and its causes. This led him to adopt new measures that, according to his biographer, Maxwell Fraser, meant that "... the loss of life was far less than in previous cholera epidemics". However, he was a miasmatist: he subscribed to the eventually discredited Miasma theory, which wrongly held that cholera was transmitted in the air. By carefully studying this cholera outbreak Dr John Snow conclusively proved his theory that cholera was spread by the use of contaminated water.

During the 1854 cholera outbreak the Board of Health had been frustrated in its efforts to limit the spread of the disease by the intransigence of the many and fragmented authorities responsible for managing sanitation and implementing instructions of the Board. In a study after the epidemic the Board found that there had been more cases of the disease in parishes where its instructions had been ignored. On 29 January 1855, Sir Benjamin addressed a letter to the Home Secretary and Prime Minister explaining these problems and setting out his observations and those of medical experts. He made it clear that the spread of the disease was localised around areas where there were "Open ditches as sewers. Want of sewers. Badly constructed sewers... sub-soil saturated with filth. Want of house drainage. Absence of any organised daily system of cleaning ... Bad water ... Lastly ... multiplicity of local authorities ..." He went on to say that "The first and most obvious necessity in the metropolis is to sweep away the existing chaos of local jurisdiction."

While it was to take him a few more years to bring legislation that would reform the government of London, following the 1855 epidemic Benjamin Hall introduced and succeeded in having passed into law further and comprehensive amendments to the Public Health Act. These allowed for decentralisation of responsibility for sanitary services and infrastructure through the establishment of local sanitary boards. The amendments also provided for the employment of officials to ensure the implementation of the measures set out in the Act and permitted the government to intervene in sanitary matters in situations where a local board did not exist or was ineffective. Notably it also introduced regulations governing the construction of houses in order to ensure that they were properly ventilated, insulated, drained and provided with appropriately located sanitary facilities.

He also introduced a bill, which on 14 August 1855, a few weeks after his departure as Minister of Health, was signed into law as the new Nuisances Removal Act for England 1855 (18 & 19 Vict. c. 121). This legislation combined and improved two previous acts, the Nuisances Removal and Diseases Prevention Act 1848 (11 & 12 Vict. c. 123) and the Nuisances Removal and Diseases Prevention Amendment Act 1849 (12 & 13 Vict. c. 111), providing local authorities in England with powers to ensure the fitness for consumption of food produce through measures which required that premises used for processing, storage and sale were suitable and ensured that the produce remained hygienic. It also controlled the discharge of effluents from such premises and provided for the appointment of committees and inspectors to enforce its provisions.

=== Member of the Privy Council ===
On 14 November 1854 he was sworn in as a member of the Privy Council at Windsor Castle. This was by virtue of his presidency of the Board of Health, but with appointments being for life, he would have continued to serve in this capacity until his death in 1867.

== First Commissioner of Works ==
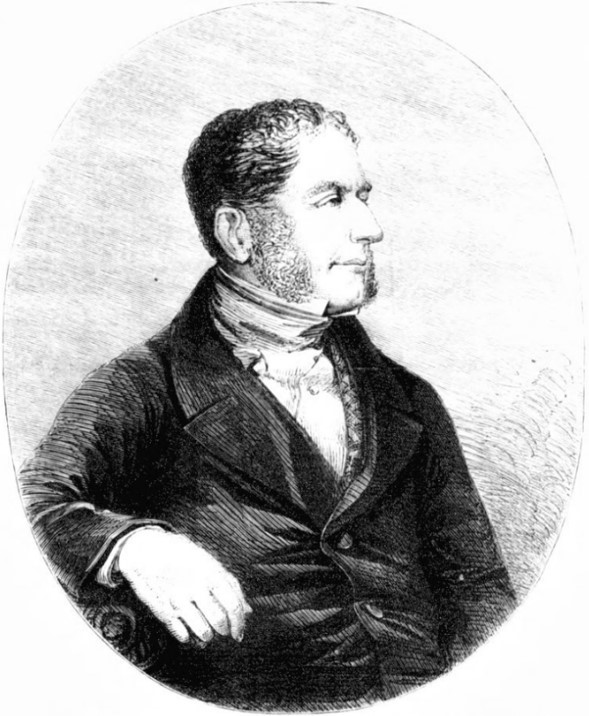
The Right Honourable Sir Benjamin Hall, First Commissioner of Works, January 1858

On 21 July 1855 he was appointed First Commissioner of Works (Also referred to as "Chief Commissioner of Works" and "Minister of Public Works"). During his tenure this was a non-cabinet portfolio and he was responsible for the Board of Works and its associated bureaucracy, the Office of Works and Public Buildings.

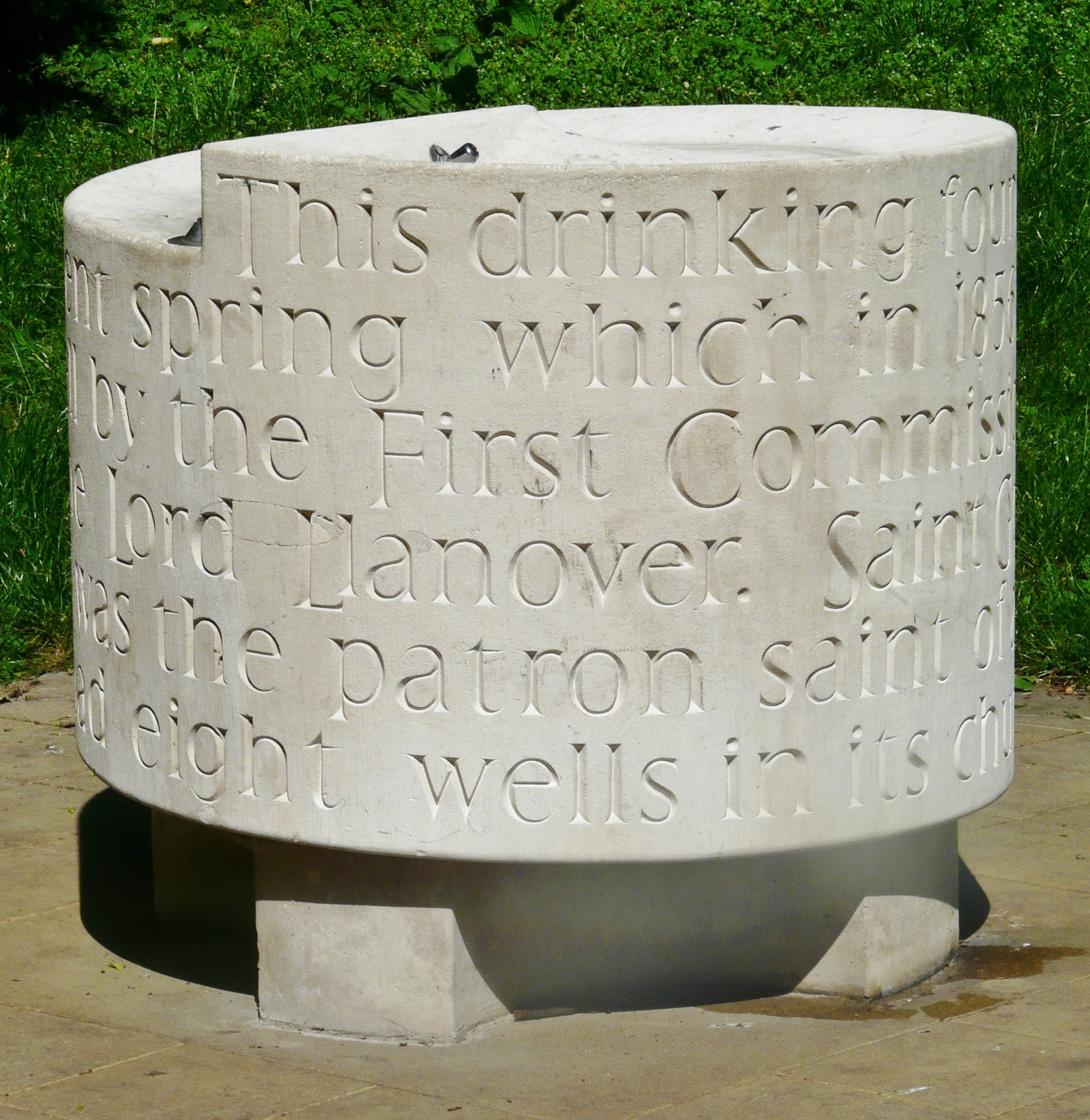
St Govor's Well drinking fountain, Kensington Gardens, London, 2014

During his two and a half year tenure in this position he did much to improve public parks and roads in London in particular and oversaw the final stages of completion of the new Houses of Parliament. Evidence of his improvement of parks remains through the presence of St Govor's Well in Kensington Gardens, a drinking fountain which he had erected and named after the patron saint of the church at Llanover. (This site is associated with the fictional character Peter Pan, being mentioned in James Barrie's children's novel The Little White Bird.) However, his singular and most noted achievement was the creation of the first unified system of government for the metropolis of London.

Another notable achievement as First Commissioner of Works was a transformation and improvement of the efficiency of the bureaucracy that supported his area of responsibility. On his arrival at what was known as the "Office of Works and Public Buildings", in his own words, he found that despite the required 10am-4pm work hours and six day week, "The Secretary had not attended for two years ... the Surveyor was of doubtful sanity and also absent, but that the Deputy Surveyor attended 'sometimes on Friday' ... while the clerks of works attended on the second Tuesday of each month". The finances of the Board of Works were also subject to over 2000 audit queries.

=== Establishment of the Metropolitan Board of Works ===
He had become convinced of the necessity of transformation of the system of government of London since he had begun to take up issues of local government from 1850 and his experience as Minister of Health had brought home to him the necessity of achieving this. In October 1854, shortly after taking up the health portfolio, he commenced work on a bill that would create the first city-wide form of government for London. The bill was informed by the report of a royal commission of the preceding year that had looked into governance and the state of the city, but ultimately differed quite substantially in many of its provisions.

During his work on health and sanitation he had become familiar with the state of the city's facilities and realised that they could only be properly managed, and further epidemics avoided, if there was coordination of construction of infrastructure and its management throughout the metropolis. At the time the city was made up of a number of independent boroughs and vestries that were unable to coordinate their efforts due to fierce protection of vested interests. These included the particularly powerful City Corporation which had successfully fended off previous attempts at reform. Recommendations of the royal commission included creation of seven new municipalities in the place of the multitude of existing authorities, but was considered too costly and likely to be firmly opposed by those who wished to retain the status quo.

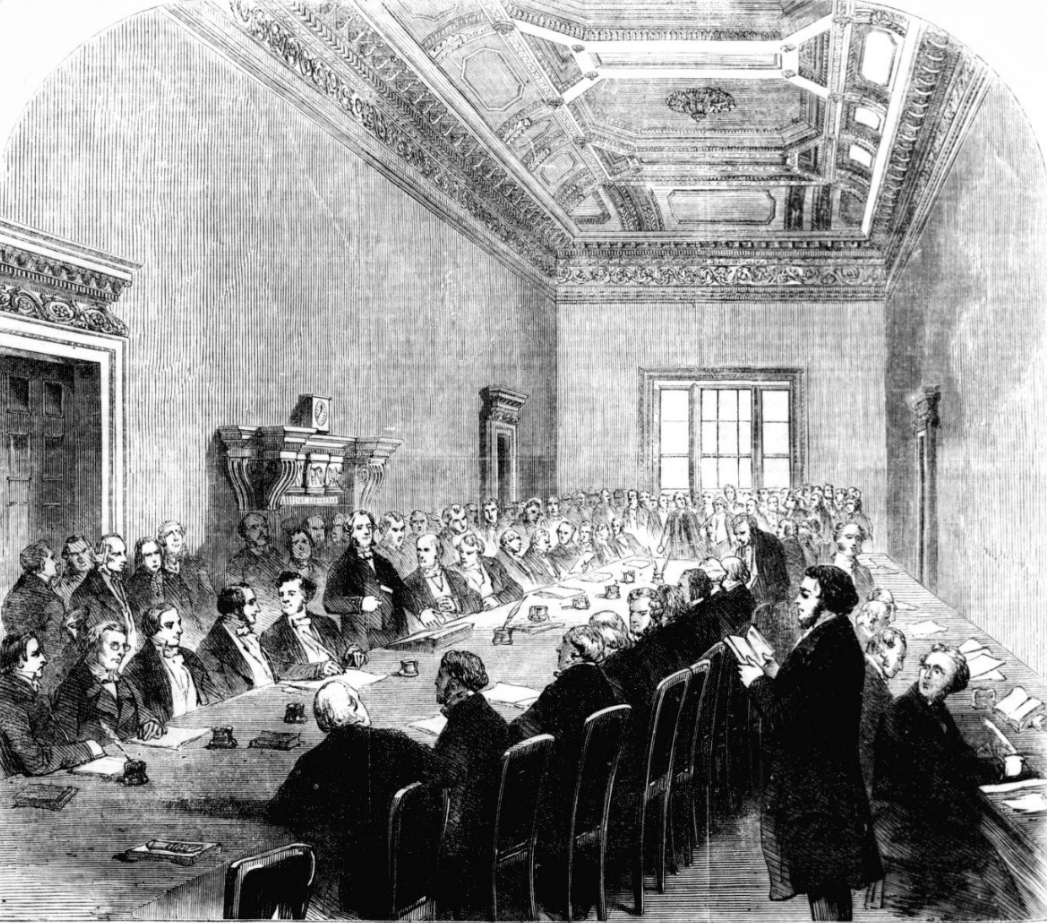
Meeting of the Metropolitan Board of Works in the Banqueting Hall, Burlington House, London, 1856

On 16 March 1855 he introduced his bill on local management in the metropolis with a speech in the House of Commons. In it he supported the royal commission's idea of establishing a Metropolitan Board of Works that would have oversight of major public works throughout the greater city and some oversight of district bodies within its areas of operation. In order to work around vested interests the board was to be made up of members appointed by the 39 existing vestries and boroughs, rather than directly elected by voters, thus ensuring that members of existing bodies who were opposed to reform could have fewer objections. The new Board was funded by transfer of receipt of coal duties previously received by the London Corporation. The metropolitan area included parts of the counties of Middlesex, Kent and Surrey. On 16 August 1855 the bill was signed into law as the Metropolis Management Act 1855. Over the following three decades the Metropolitan Board of Works markedly improved the general state of the greater London area, including sanitary services, roads, paving and lighting and their state of maintenance.

When introducing his bill for establishment of the Metropolitan Board of Works, Sir Benjamin Hall had promised the introduction of further reforms of municipal government that would go beyond matters of public works. Over the following decades several attempts were made to expand the powers of the board into other areas and reduce the number of authorities responsible for local government in London, but until the establishment of the London County Council in 1889 all failed.

Concerning his achievement of a unified system of metropolitan government for London, Sir Gwilym Gibbon and Reginald Bell, in their 'History of the London County Council', state that "For his work in this alone, [Sir Benjamin Hall] will always stand high in the history of London".

=== Big Ben ===
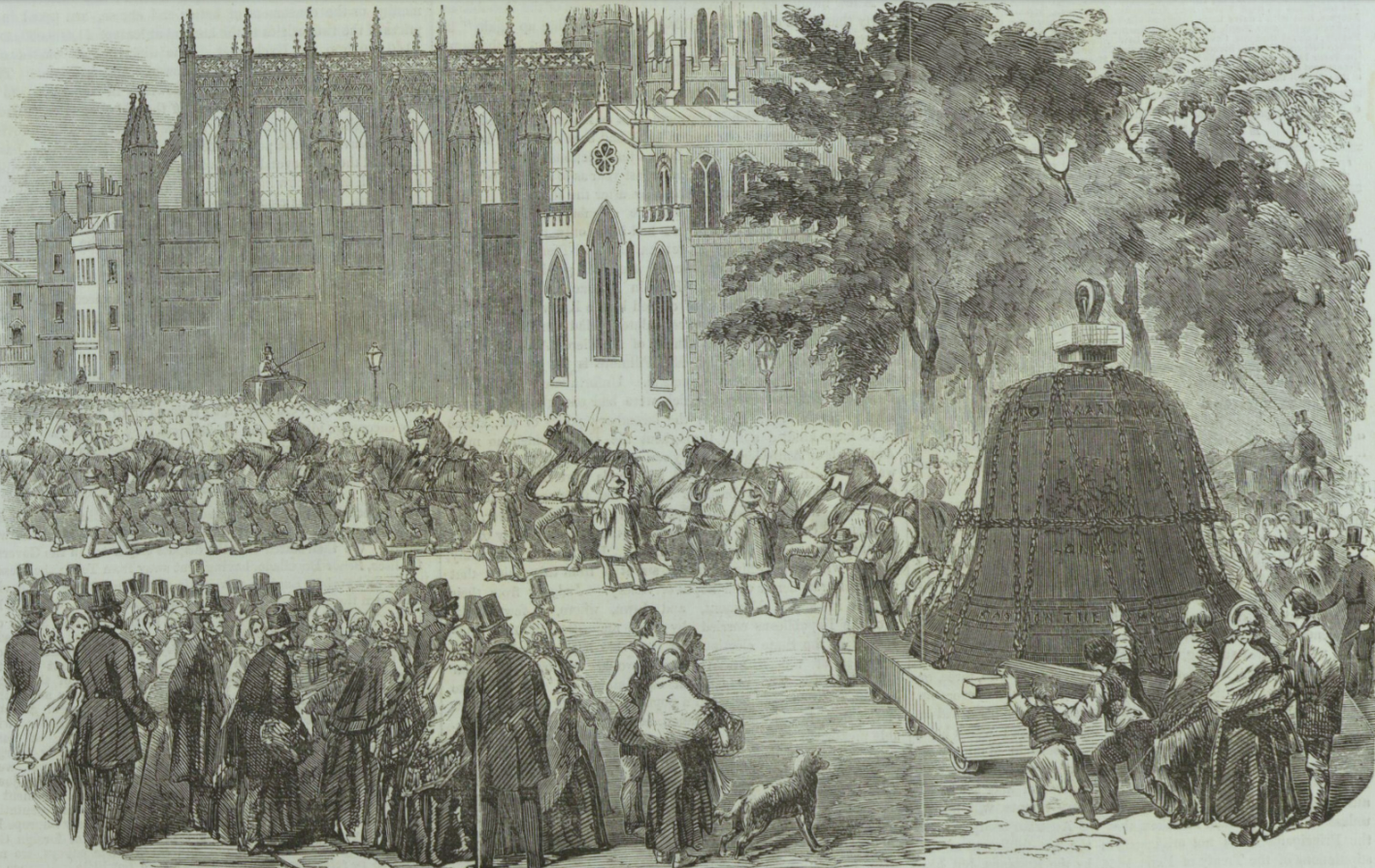
The first version of the Big Ben Bell on its way to Parliament, October 1856

At over 6 ft 4 in (1.93 m) tall, Sir Benjamin was known as "Big Ben". At the time of the installation of the first casting of the famous and largest bell in the Elizabeth Tower of the Houses of Parliament in 1856, he was in his capacity as First Commissioner of Works responsible for the works and the bell came to be called "Big Ben" in his honour. The following year the bell cracked and had to be recast, but retained its name despite the fact that he was no longer Commissioner of Works.

== Baron Llanover of Llanover and Abercarn ==
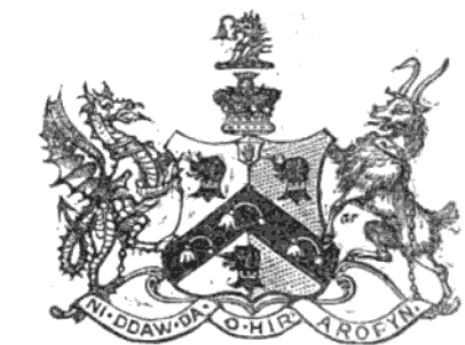
Coat of arms as Lord Llanover

After the collapse of the government in February 1858 Benjamin Hall sat on the opposition benches, but following the election of May 1859 and the victory of a coalition of Whigs, Radicals, Peelites and a grouping of Irish MPs that formed the first Liberal Party government, he had hopes of returning to office and it was for a time rumoured that he would be offered the position of Home Secretary. On 16 June he was summoned by the Prime Minister and instead of a ministry was offered a barony with elevation to the House of Lords. He took the title of Baron Llanover of Llanover and Abercarn, the names of his estates in Monmouthshire. This effectively marked the end of his career in politics as in the House of Lords he was never as active as he had been in the Commons and seldom contributed to debate.

== Ideology ==
The 'Imperial Dictionary of Universal Biography' says that "His political liberalism was of a very advanced kind" and in a profile in the Monmouthshire Merlin in 1854 he is characterised as "one of the most independent members of the House of Commons – the most liberal and most consistent ... an upright honourable honest man ... regardless of the transient glare of popularity...." whose speeches were delivered with an "exceedingly good humor".

A man of his times, his attitude as a wealthy reformer is well captured by the following quotation from his own writings: "It gives me great pleasure always to see a liberal man ... possessed of a large income ... it lies in such a man's (power) to do either harm or good as he chooses, and as so many seem almost to prefer the former, it is a blessing to the lower classes when they find their superior act upon the latter principle".

A lifelong proponent of Welsh culture and language, he clearly regarded himself as a Welshman and, despite spending a large part of his life in London and expending much effort on improving the quality of life of residents of that city, in his writings he always referred to "the English" in a way that defined him differently. This appears to have been an issue of identity rather than a political expression of Welsh nationalism.

== Personal life ==
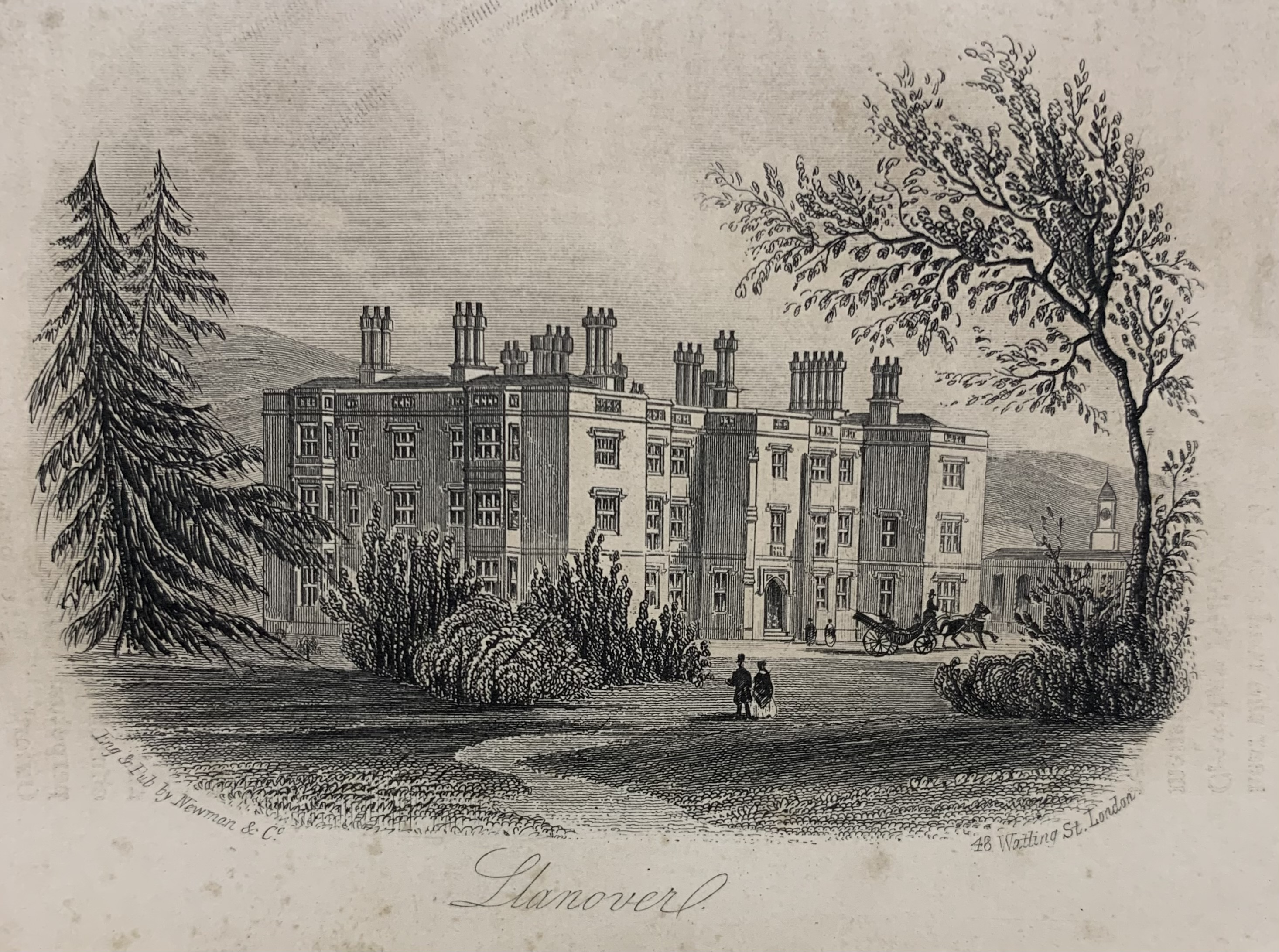
Llanover House, Monmouthshire. The home of Benjamin and Augusta Hall (Lord and Lady Llanover)

On 4 November 1823, he married Augusta Waddington the daughter and heiress of Benjamin Waddington. She was a promoter of Welsh culture and language and the home they built on the Llanover Estate in Monmouthshire was a centre for associated activities. They had two sons, neither of whom survived into adulthood, and a daughter, Augusta Charlotte Elizabeth, who married the wealthy Catholic John Herbert (12 Nov 1846) and was the mother of Ivor Herbert, 1st Baron Treowen. (Note: "England and Wales Birth Registration Index, 1837-2008," database, FamilySearch (https://familysearch.org/ark:/61903/1:1:2NQ7-DW8 : 1 October 2014), Ivor John Cradock Herbert Herbert, 1851; from "England & Wales Births, 1837-2006," database, findmypast (http://www.findmypast.com : 2012); citing Birth Registration, Abergavenny, Monmouthshire, England, citing General Register Office, Southport, England.)

Although tolerant of other beliefs, Augusta Herbert's parents were concerned regarding the attitudes of their more conservative tenants towards a future Catholic landlord. The Herberts were not agreeable to the suggestion that one of their sons be raised as an Anglican heir and the Llanover's turned to Benjamin Hall's sister, Charlotte Berrington's family, agreeing that her son, Arthur, would inherit their estates. He began to take on some of the responsibilities for their management, but after a time he and Lord Llanover disagreed on a suitable marriage partner for Arthur and Arthur declined to follow his uncle into politics and did not share his liberal convictions. As a result, the relationship between the Llanovers and Berringtons broke down and the Llanover and Abercarn estates were ultimately left to the Herberts.

On 27 April 1867 Lord Llanover died at his home in Mayfair, London aged 64, whereupon the baronetcy and barony became extinct. A keen hunter throughout his life, he lost an eye in a hunting accident in 1848. His death was the result of a facial tumour caused by a shooting accident in November 1866. He was buried in the family tomb in St Bartholomew's Church, Llanover.

== Notes ==
Parliament of the United Kingdom
Preceded by Marquess of Worcester	Member of Parliament for Monmouth; 1831	Succeeded by Marquess of Worcester
Preceded by Marquess of Worcester	Member of Parliament for Monmouth; 1832–1837	Succeeded by Reginald Blewitt
Preceded by Sir Henry Bulwer; Sir Samuel Whalley	Member of Parliament for Marylebone; 1837–1859; With: Sir Samuel Whalley 1837–1838; Charles Shore 1838–1841; Sir Charles Napier 1841–1847; Lord Dudley Stuart 1847–1854; Viscount Ebrington 1854–1859; Edwin James 1859	Succeeded by Edwin James; The Lord Fermoy
Political offices
New office	President of the Board of Health; 1854–1855	Succeeded by William Cowper
Preceded by Sir William Molesworth, Bt	First Commissioner of Works; 1855–1858	Succeeded by Lord John Manners
Honorary titles
Preceded by Capel Hanbury Leigh	Lord Lieutenant of Monmouthshire; 1861–1867	Succeeded by The Duke of Beaufort
Baronetage of the United Kingdom
New title	Baronet (of Llanover-court); 1838–1867	Extinct
Preceded by Bellew baronets	Hall baronets of Llanover; August 1838	Succeeded by Clayton-East baronets
Peerage of the United Kingdom
New title	Baron Llanover; 1859–1867	Extinct
