= Henry Bulwer, 1st Baron Dalling and Bulwer =

British Liberal politician, diplomat and writer (1801–1872)

Baron Dalling and Bulwer
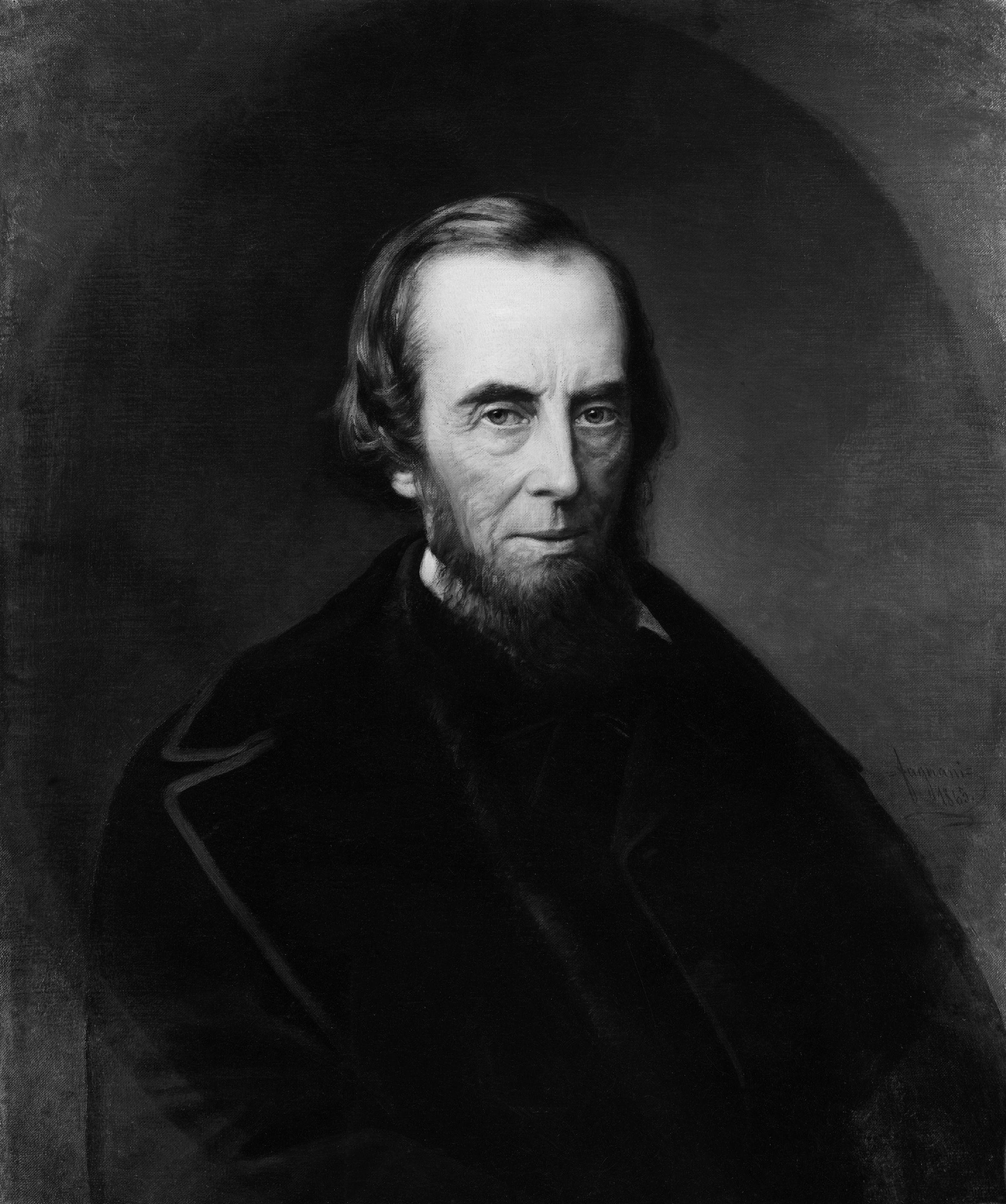
- Portrait by Joseph (Giuseppe) Fagnani

Member of Parliament for Wilton
- In office 1830–1831
- Preceded by: John Penruddocke; Edward Baker
- Succeeded by: John Penruddocke; James Dawkins

Member of Parliament for Coventry
- In office 1831–1835
- Preceded by: Thomas Fyler; Edward Ellice
- Succeeded by: Edward Ellice; William Williams

Member of Parliament for Marylebone
- In office 1835–1837
- Preceded by: Sir William Horne; Sir Samuel Whalley
- Succeeded by: Sir Samuel Whalley; Sir Benjamin Hall

Member of Parliament for Tamworth
- In office 1868–1871
- Preceded by: Sir Robert Peel, Bt; John Peel
- Succeeded by: Sir Robert Peel, Bt; John Peel

Personal details
- Born: William Henry Lytton Earle Bulwer; 13 February 1801 London, England
- Died: 23 May 1872 (aged 71) Naples
- Party: Liberal
- Spouse: Georgiana Wellesley (m. 1848)
- Parent(s): William Earle Bulwer; Elizabeth Barbara Warburton-Lytton
- Education: Trinity College, Cambridge; Downing College, Cambridge

William Henry Lytton Earle Bulwer, 1st Baron Dalling and Bulwer, GCB, PC (13 February 1801 – 23 May 1872) was a British Liberal politician, diplomat and writer.

== Background and education ==
Bulwer was the second son of General William Bulwer and his wife, Elizabeth Barbara, daughter of Richard Warburton-Lytton. He was an elder brother of Edward Bulwer-Lytton, 1st Baron Lytton, uncle of Robert Bulwer-Lytton, 1st Earl of Lytton, Viceroy of India, 1876–1880, and the uncle of Sir Henry Ernest Gascoyne Bulwer. He was educated at Harrow School, Trinity College and then the recently founded Downing College, both at Cambridge. After graduating and touring the continent, he joined the Life Guards in 1824 and exchanged to the 58th Regiment of Foot two years later.

== Diplomatic and political career ==
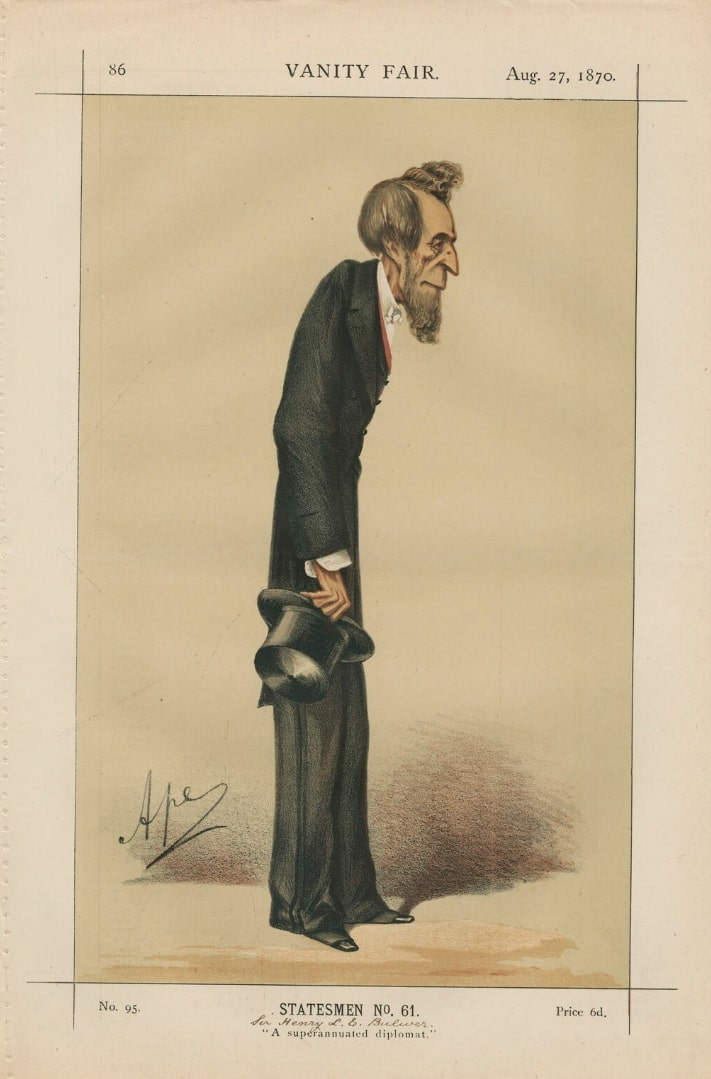
"A superannuated diplomat" Bulwer as caricatured by Ape (Carlo Pellegrini) in Vanity Fair, August 1870

After having unsuccessfully contested Hertford in 1826, Bulwer joined the Diplomatic Service in 1827 and was sent to Berlin in August that year, to Vienna in April 1829 and then to The Hague in April 1830. In July 1830, he entered the House of Commons as MP for the rotten borough of Wilton and was sent to Brussels the following month to report on the Belgian Revolution. A year later, he was returned for Coventry, again in 1833, then for Marylebone in 1835.

At a meeting in Sydney on 29 May 1835, Australian statesman William Wentworth discussed a proposal of Bulwer's for a colonial committee to be formed which would act through a Parliamentary Advocate, for which Bulwer nominated himself, to represent New South Wales. The meeting resolved to raise £2,000 to fund the position by establishing the Australian Patriotic Association, Australia's first political party.

That year, Bulwer planned to join General Evans, who was raising a legion to help Isabella II of Spain in the First Carlist War, but was instead sent back to the newly independent Belgium as secretary of legation. When a general election was called two years later on the death of William IV, Bulwer decided not to contest his current seat for Marylebone and after having commuted between Parliament and his diplomatics posts for seven years, decided to become a full-time diplomat and was sent to Constantinople.

A year later, Bulwer was due to go to St Petersburg after accepting a new post there, but caught a fever just before leaving Istanbul and instead went back to London. Upon his arrival, the government was embroiled in the Bedchamber Crisis and because of the delays involved, Bulwer did not take up his post in Russia and was instead sent to Paris in June 1839. After having dealt with the poor Anglo-French relations prior to the London Straits Convention, Bulwer was sent to Madrid in November 1843 and served there until Narváez instructed him to leave in 1848, after being accused of implicating liberal risings against the former's conservative government. By now a diplomatic embarrassment in Europe, the British government formally showed its support of Bulwer by making him a KCB that year, but sent him far from Europe, to Washington a year later.

Bulwer enjoyed his three years in America, having been promoted to GCB during his office, but wished to return to Europe and so was posted to Florence, Tuscany, in 1852. His two years in Italy were largely uneventful and ill health forced him back to London in 1854. He was granted a pension a year later and it was at this time that he and his wife separated. When his health improved, Bulwer was in Eastern Europe from 1856 to 1858. In 1858, he succeeded Lord Stratford de Redcliffe as Ambassador to the Ottoman Empire and his wife joined him. He significantly contributed to the indebtedness of the Ottoman regime. This was his final diplomatic post before his semi-retirement in 1865.

On his return to England, Bulwer went back to politics and successfully contested Tamworth in 1868. He returned to literature after his retirement and was also raised to the peerage as Baron Dalling and Bulwer, of Dalling in the County of Norfolk, in 1871.

== Personal life ==
Lord Dalling and Bulwer married the Honourable Georgiana, youngest daughter of Henry Wellesley, 1st Baron Cowley and a niece of the Duke of Wellington, at Hatfield House in December 1848. They had no children. On his return from a trip to Egypt in 1872, Bulwer died suddenly in Naples, aged 71, when the barony became extinct. His will was valued at less than £5,000. His estranged widow died in August 1878, aged 61.

A Freemason, he became the first district grand master for Turkey under the United Grand Lodge of England in 1862.

== Principal works ==
- Ode on the Death of Napoleon; Lines on the Neapolitan Revolution; and Other Poems. 1822
- An Autumn in Greece; Comprising Sketches of the Character, Customs, and Scenery of the Country; with a View of Its Present Critical State. In Letters, Addressed to C.B. Sheridan, Esq. 1826
- France, Social, Literary, Political. 1834
- The Monarchy of the Middle Classes. France, Social, Literary, Political, Second Series. 1836
- Historical characters: Talleyrand, Cobbett, Mackintosh, Canning 2 vols. 1868
- The Life of Henry John Temple, Viscount Palmerston: With Selections from His Diaries and Correspondence. 1870
- Sir Robert Peel. An Historical Sketch. 1874

== Notes ==
Parliament of the United Kingdom
Preceded by John Penruddocke; Edward Baker	Member of Parliament for Wilton; 1830–1831; With: John Penruddocke	Succeeded by John Penruddocke; James Dawkins
Preceded by Thomas Fyler; Edward Ellice	Member of Parliament for Coventry; 1831–1835; With: Edward Ellice	Succeeded by Edward Ellice; William Williams
Preceded by Sir William Horne; Sir Samuel Whalley	Member of Parliament for Marylebone; 1835–1837; With: Sir Samuel Whalley	Succeeded by Sir Samuel Whalley; Sir Benjamin Hall
Preceded by Sir Robert Peel, Bt; John Peel	Member of Parliament for Tamworth; 1868–1871; With: Sir Robert Peel, Bt	Succeeded by Sir Robert Peel, Bt; John Peel
Diplomatic posts
Preceded by Hon. George Jerningham (Chargé d'Affaires)	British Ambassador to Spain; 1844–1848	Succeeded by John Hobart Caradoc, 2nd Baron Howden
Preceded by Richard Pakenham	British Minister to the United States; 1849–1852	Succeeded by Sir John Crampton
Preceded by James Hudson	British Minister to Tuscany; 1852–1854	Succeeded by The Marquess of Normanby
Preceded by The Viscount Stratford de Redcliffe	British Ambassador to the Ottoman Empire; 1858–1865	Succeeded by The Lord Lyons
