= Harvey Lewis (politician) =

Irish lawyer and politician

John Harvey Lewis (1814 – 23 October 1888) was an Irish-born lawyer and Liberal politician who sat in the House of Commons of the United Kingdom from 1861 to 1874.

== Background ==
Lewis was the son of William Lewis of Harlech, County Dublin and his wife Dora Cassidy, daughter of John Cassidy of Monasterevin, County Kildare. He was educated at Trinity College, Dublin graduating BA in 1835 and MA in 1838. He was called to the bar in Ireland in 1838 and was in practice until 1850. He was a Deputy Lieutenant of Middlesex and Tower Hamlets and a J.P. for Middlesex and Westminster. He was High Sheriff of Kildare in 1857.

== Political career ==
Lewis stood for parliament unsuccessfully at Hull in 1859. He was elected Member of Parliament for Marylebone at a by-election in April 1861. He held the seat until 1874. He was described as "in favour of the principle of non-intervention and opposed to the present pressure that the income-tax has upon professional men and traders."

== Personal life ==
Lewis married firstly in 1840, Emily Ball daughter of George Ball of Richmond Hill, Surrey. She died in 1850 and he married secondly in 1855 his housekeeper Jane Isabella Brown, daughter of William Brown. Lewis died at the age of 74. He left no children. Jane Isabella Lewis died in 1904 but under the terms of her will a legacy was later used to fund the construction of a private ward at the Royal Victoria Eye and Ear Hospital in Dublin. The ward was named the Harvey Lewis Wing in memory of John Harvey Lewis.

== Arms ==
Coat of arms of Harvey Lewis

Notes
Granted 13 May 1856 by Sir John Bernard Burke, Ulster King of Arms.
Crest
Out of a ducal coronet Proper a plume of five ostrich feathers alternately Gules and Azure charged with a chevron Or.
Escutcheon
Sable a chevron Ermine charged with a mullet Gules between three spear heads Argent.
Motto
Bidd Llu Hebb Llydd

Parliament of the United Kingdom
Preceded by Edwin James; Lord Fermoy	Member of Parliament for Marylebone; 1861 – 1874; With: Lord Fermoy to 1865; Thomas Chambers from 1865	Succeeded by William Forsyth; Thomas Chambers
