= Charles Shore, 2nd Baron Teignmouth =

British politician (1796–1885)

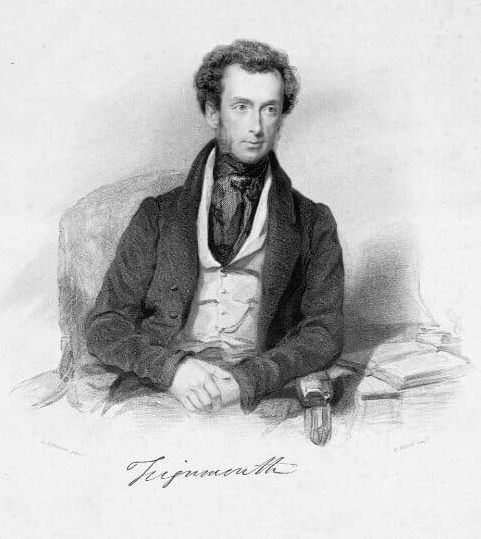

Charles John Shore, 2nd Baron Teignmouth FRS (13 January 1796 – 18 September 1885) was a British Conservative politician.

== Background and education ==
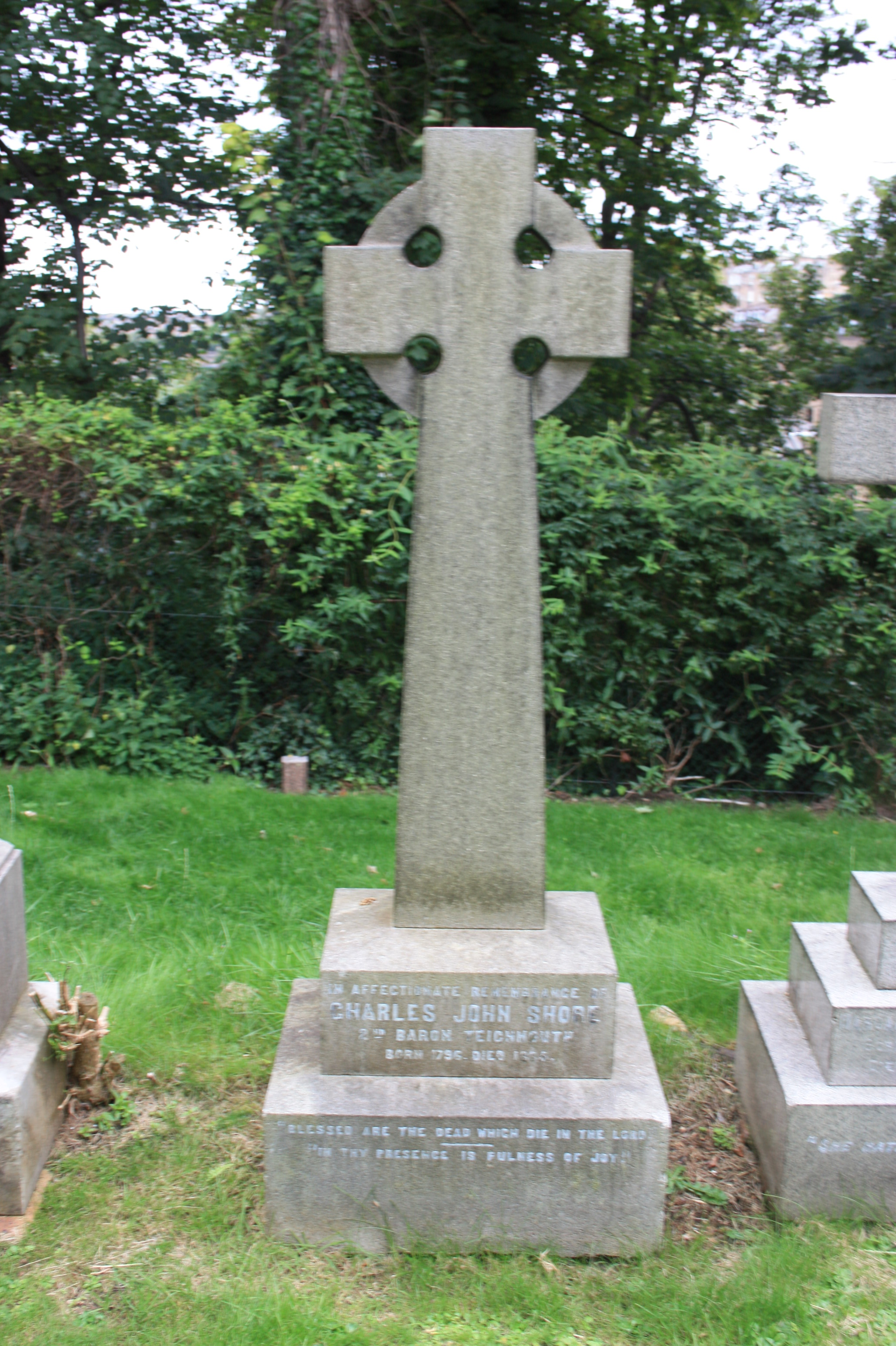
The grave of Charles John Shore, Dean Cemetery, Edinburgh

Charles John Shore was born in Calcutta in India, the son of John Shore, 1st Baron Teignmouth and Charlotte, only daughter of James Cornish, a medical practitioner at Teignmouth. He was educated at a private school in Clapham and, from 1808, a school in Chobham, Surrey. He then entered Trinity College, Cambridge, where he was the third President of the Cambridge Union Society.

On his death at 89 years of age he was buried in Dean Cemetery in western Edinburgh. The grave lies in the south-west spur.

== Family ==
On 8 December 1838 he married Caroline, fifth daughter of William Browne of Tallantine Hall, Cumberland, who bore him three sons and three daughters. [5]

== Political career ==
Lord Teignmouth served as MP for Marylebone from 1838 to 1841. He came third in the poll in the 1837 General Election, but took his seat on 3 March 1838, after Sir Samuel Whalley's election was declared void.

In June 1834 he was elected a Fellow of the Royal Society.

His autobiography, Reminiscences of Many Years, was published in 1878.

== Arms ==
Coat of arms of Charles Shore, 2nd Baron Teignmouth
Crest A stork regardant with a stone in its dexter claw Proper. Escutcheon Argent a chevron Sable between three holly leaves Vert. Supporters Two storks regardant Proper. Motto Perimus Licitis (We Die In A Good Cause)

Parliament of the United Kingdom
Preceded by Samuel Whalley; Benjamin Hall	Member of Parliament for Marylebone; 1838 – 1841; With: Benjamin Hall	Succeeded by Charles John Napier; Benjamin Hall
Peerage of Ireland
Preceded by John Shore	Baron Teignmouth; 1834–1885	Succeeded by Charles James Shore
