= Edwin James (barrister) =

English lawyer, MP & actor (1812-1882)

Edwin John James
- Born: John Edwin James; 1812; London, England
- Died: 4 March 1882 (aged 69–70); 11 Bayley Street, Bedford Square, London
- Resting place: Highgate Cemetery
- Spouses: Marianne Hilliard (m. 1861; div. 1863) Eliza Wilson (née Pepper) (m. 1868; died 1882)
- Relatives: Harvey Christian Combe (great-uncle)

Edwin John James (c.1812 – 4 March 1882) was an English lawyer who also practised in the United States, a Member of Parliament and would-be actor. Disbarred in England and Wales for professional misconduct, he ended his life in poverty. He was the first ever Queen's Counsel to suffer disbarment.

== Early life and education ==
His parents were John James, a solicitor and secondary of the City of London, and his wife Caroline née Combe, niece of Harvey Christian Combe.

He unsuccessfully attempted to establish a career as an actor at an early age, taking lessons from John Cooper. He played at a private theatre in Gough Street, Gray's Inn Road, London and appeared as George Barnwell in The London Merchant at Cooper's Theatre Royal, Bath. But, he lacked the natural good looks to succeed in the theatre, being said by one Cyrus Jay to have "the appearance of a prize fighter". He turned to the law to become a barrister, being called to the bar by the Inner Temple in 1836. He was a student and admirer of Charles James Fox and followed his style at the Bar with great fidelity.

== Career ==
James practised on the Home circuit and his most famous cases included:

- The successful prosecution of poisoner William Palmer in 1856.
- The successful defence of Simon Bernard, who was tried in 1858 for complicity with Felice Orsini in his plot to assassinate Napoleon III of France. James aroused controversy with his defence that Bernard had intended to kill a person other than Napoleon III. John Simon was James's junior at the trial.
- The Canadian appeal case of the fugitive slave John Anderson.

James was made QC in 1850 but was not elected a bencher of the Inner Temple as was customary. This may have been because of the Establishment's distaste for his radical sympathies and the nature of his practice. The Spectator described him as:

... a leader in all actions for seduction, breach of promise of marriage, assault, and false imprisonment, and in all cases that involved the reputation of an actress or a horse.

The New York Times noted that:

Mr. James was a man of very brilliant parts and great ability, and was at one time considered by the late Lord Chancellor Campbell the best nisus prius jury lawyer at the English Bar.

James was appointed Recorder of Brighton in 1855, by that time enjoying an income of £7,000 per year (£477,000 at 2003 prices). In 1859 he was elected Liberal MP for Marylebone.

As an MP, he was a loyal supporter of Palmerston and favoured the introduction of a ballot for parliamentary elections and the abolition of church taxes to support the state church. His radicalism went beyond the mainstream. He spoke in public in support of democracy and against Napoleon III, and spent part of 1859 at the camp of Giuseppe Garibaldi.

== Scandal ==
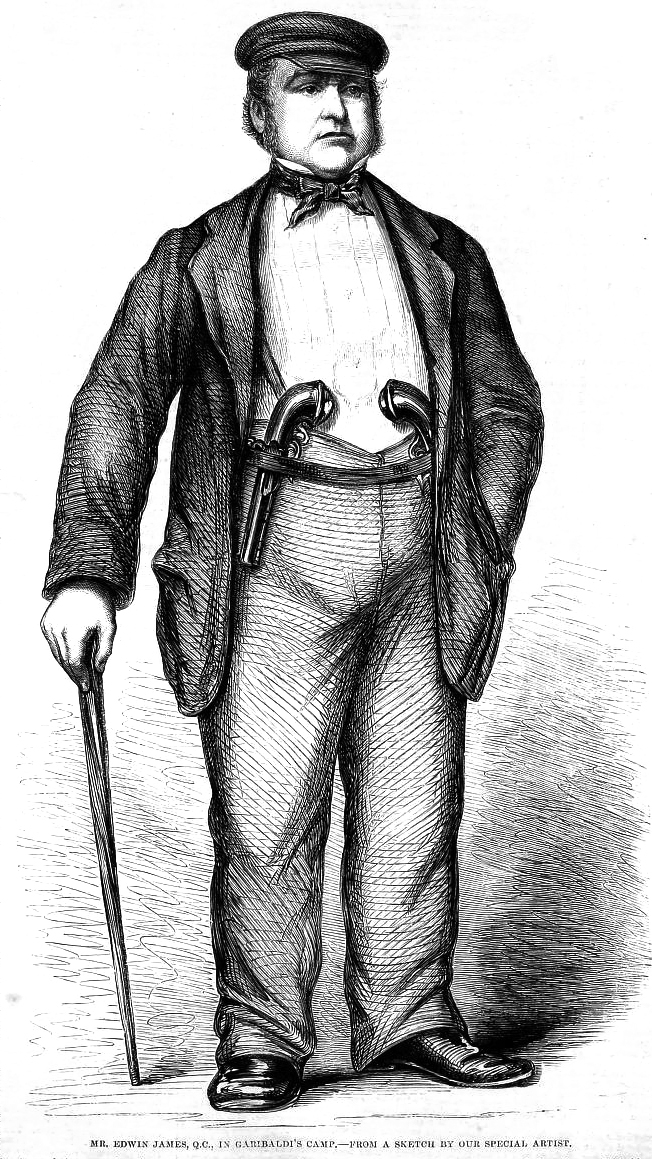
Mr Edwin James QC in Garibaldi's Camp - From a sketch by our special artist, Illustrated London News, 13 October 1860

James’s reputation suffered by his alleged bribery of voters in his campaign on behalf of John Jervis in the Horsham constituency in 1847.

Early in 1861, James was reputedly on the point of being appointed Attorney General but on 9 April 1861, he suddenly resigned all his public offices, stating that he needed to devote his time to his professional career. It came to light that he was in dire financial difficulties, owing £100,000 (£7.5 million at 2003 prices) and under investigation by his Inn. It was established that he had:

- Led Lord Worsley, the young son of Lord Yarborough, into debts of £35,000 (£2.6 million at 2003 prices) in 1857 and 1860;
- Obtained £20,000 (£1.6 million at 2003 prices) from Mr Fryar, a solicitor and his election advisor, by misrepresentation in 1853; and
- Borrowed £1,250 (£94,000 at 2003 prices) from a witness he was to cross-examine in return for a promise of light questioning.

Yarborough apparently persuaded James to resign his public offices in order to protect Worsley.

== Disbarment and after ==
Disbarred on 18 June 1861, James soon emigrated to the U.S. and was admitted to the bar in New York. There he was lauded as a leader of the English Bar, and he commented publicly on matters of public controversy, such as the Trent Affair. The British press suggested that the New York Bar were well aware of his disbarment in England.

When James' earlier conduct did become known in America, an attempt was made to disbar him there; it failed when he denied the charges on oath and the judges were equally divided as to his culpability. He appeared to have resurrected his acting career, performing at the Winter Garden Theatre, New York in 1865.

He became an associate editor of the New York Clipper, a sporting and entertainment newspaper. He also worked as the publicity manager for Adah Menken, the actress known for her sensational performance in Mazeppa. He kept up a long correspondence with her until her death in Paris. He took American citizenship in 1866.

After returning to England in 1873, James failed to gain readmission to the bar of England and Wales. He also failed to be admitted as a solicitor or to be selected for Marylebone. He practised as a paralegal for the rest of his life but was in poor financial circumstances, and eventually relied on charity. A subscription for his pecuniary assistance was started among the legal profession in London shortly before his death.

== Personal life and character ==
On 9 July 1861 James married Marianne née Hilliard, "a widow lady of fortune", at the Embassy in Paris. They divorced in 1863, after having emigrated to the United States.

James became a naturalized United States citizen in 1866. In 1868 he married Eliza Wilson née Pepper. She had formerly been married to Joachim Hayward Stocqueler.

Mr. James is described by his old partner, Mr. Charles Blandy, as a gentleman of the most genial disposition and with an unlimited stock of anecdotes and store of experience. He was a scholar of the first grade, and his knowledge of art, literature, and the classics was as fresh as when he left college. He was odd in his personal tastes, and had a passionate fondness for dogs. He never became accustomed to American habits, and the lack of caste in society was a source of great annoyance to him. He was a man of powerful frame, 6 feet high, with large features, and generally wore an inverness cape, a rough tweed suit, and hobnailed boots, his appearance being that of the typical English country gentleman.

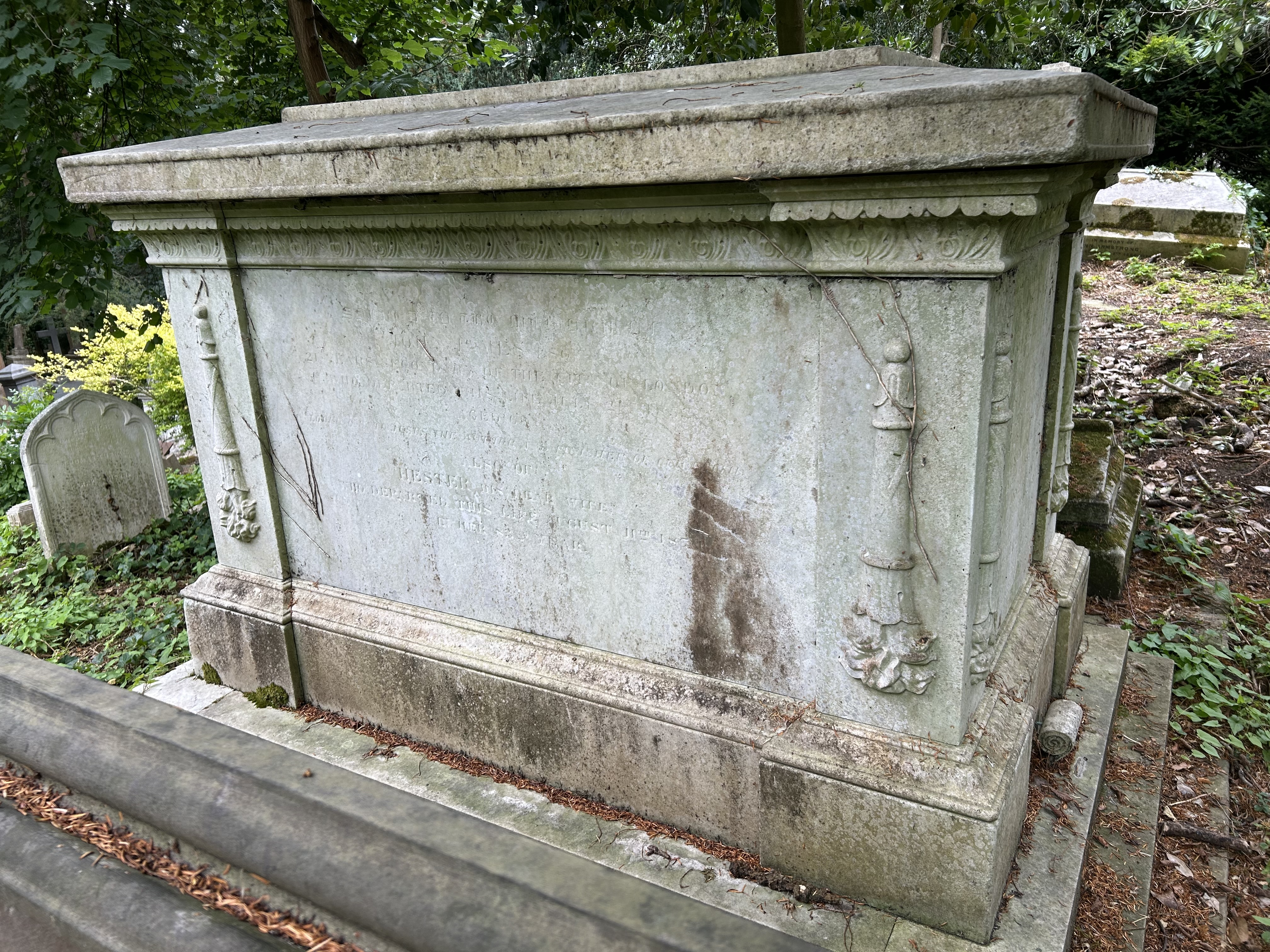
James family vault in Highgate Cemetery

John Edwin James died of bronchitis and pneumonia and was buried on 6 March 1882 in the James family vault in the western side of Highgate Cemetery.

== In popular culture ==
Edwin James served as a basis of the character Stryver in Charles Dickens's 1859 novel A Tale of Two Cities.

== Bibliography ==
=== Obituaries ===
- The Times, 7 March 1882, p.10 col.D
- New York Times, 7 March 1882, p.10
- Daily News, 7 March 1882, p.5
- Solicitors' Journal, 26 (1881–2), 301
- Law Times, 18 March 1882, p.358

=== By James ===
- James, E. J. (1842) The Act for the Amendment of the Law in Bankruptcy
- — (1858) The Speech of E. James in Defence of S. Bernard
- — (1867) The Bankrupt Law of the United States
- — (1872) The Political Institutions of America and England

=== About James ===
- [Anon.] (1859) Illustrated London News, 30 April 429
- [Anon.] (1861a) "The fall of Mr Edwin James", Saturday Review, 13 April 358–359
- [Anon.] (1861b) "Edwin James on the Trent Affair", Solicitors' Journal and Reporter, 8 February 253
- [Anon.] (1861–2) Law Magazine, new series, 12:263–86
- [Anon.] (1862a) "The disbarmment of Edwin James, Esq. Q.C.", Solicitors' Journal and Reporter, 14 December 103
- [Anon.] (1862b) "The Inner Temple benchers – Disbarment of Edwin James Q.C.", Law Magazine and Review, 12:266; 13:335–45
- [Anon.] (1862c) Annual Register, 140–43
- Boase, G. C. (1892). "James, Edwin John" . In Lee, Sidney (ed.). Dictionary of National Biography. Vol. 29. London: Smith, Elder & Co. pp. 206–207.
- — rev. Metcalfe, E. (2004) "James, Edwin John (1812–1882)", Oxford Dictionary of National Biography, Oxford University Press, accessed 27 Dec 2007 (subscription, Wikipedia Library access or UK public library membership required)
- Lewis, J.R. (1980). Certain Private Incidents, The Rise and Fall of Edwin James QC, MP. Newcastle upon Tyne: Templar North Publications.
- Knott, G. H. (1912). The Trial of William Palmer (Notable English Trials ed.). Edinburgh: William Hodge & Co. ISBN 0-665-85182-0.
- Pue, W. W. (1990). "Moral panic at the English Bar: Paternal vs. commercial ideologies of legal practice in the 1860s". Law and Social Inquiry. 15 (1): 49–118. doi:10.1111/j.1747-4469.1990.tb00275.x. S2CID 145788677., pp75–86
- Stenton, M., ed. (1976). Who's Who of British Members of Parliament: Volume I 1832–1885. London: The Harvester Press.

Parliament of the United Kingdom
Preceded by Viscount Ebrington; Sir Benjamin Hall, Bt	Member of Parliament for Marylebone; 1859–1861; With: Sir Benjamin Hall, Bt 1859; The Lord Fermoy 1859–1861	Succeeded by Harvey Lewis; The Lord Fermoy
