= Clayton baronets of Marden Park (1732) =

Escutcheon of the Clayton-East baronets of Marden Park

The Clayton baronetcy, of Marden Park in the County of Surrey, was created in the Baronetage of Great Britain on 13 January 1732 for William Clayton, Member of Parliament for Bletchingley. He was the nephew of Sir Robert Clayton, Lord Mayor of London in 1679.

Clayton was succeeded by his son Sir Kenrick Clayton, 2nd Baronet, who also represented Bletchingley in the House of Commons; his son Robert, the third Baronet, was Member of Parliament for Bletchingley, Surrey and Ilchester. He was childless and was succeeded by his first cousin Sir William Clayton, 4th Baronet, who was the son of William Clayton, younger son of 1st Baronet. Clayton notably served as High Sheriff of Buckinghamshire. His second son East was created a baronet, of Hall Place, in his own right in 1838 (see Clayton-East baronets of Hall Place (1838)). Clayton was succeeded by his eldest son Sir William Clayton, 5th Baronet. He was a General in the Army and fought at the Battle of Waterloo. He also represented Great Marlow in Parliament.

On his death the title passed to his grandson, the 6th Baronet, son of Captain William Capel Clayton. He was High Sheriff of Buckinghamshire and Norfolk. He was childless and on his death in 1914 the title passed to his second cousin Sir Gilbert Clayton-East, 3rd Baronet, Hall Place (see below for earlier history of this title), who became the seventh Baronet of Marden Park as well. In 1870 he had assumed the surname of Clayton-East in lieu of Gilbert-East. His grandson, the 9th/5th Baronet, assumed in 1932 by deed poll the surname of Clayton-East-Clayton in lieu of Clayton-East. However, on his early death the same year, the line of the second son of the fourth Baronet failed and the baronetcy of Hall Place became extinct. The late Baronet was succeeded in the baronetcy of Marden Park by his second cousin twice removed, the tenth Baronet. He was the son of Sir FitzRoy Augustus Talbot Clayton, son of Reverend Augustus Philip Clayton, fifth and youngest son of the 4th Baronet. As of 2021, the title is held by the 10th Baronet's great-grandson, the 13th Baronet, who succeeded his father in that year.

== Clayton, Clayton-East, Clayton-East-Clayton baronets, of Marden Park (1732) ==
- Sir William Clayton, 1st Baronet (died 1744)
- Sir Kenrick Clayton, 2nd Baronet (c. 1713 – 1769)
- Sir Robert Clayton, 3rd Baronet (c. 1740 – 1799)
- Sir William Clayton, 4th Baronet (1762–1834)
- General Sir William Robert Clayton, 5th Baronet (1786–1866)
- Sir William Robert Clayton, 6th Baronet (1842–1914)
- Sir Gilbert Augustus Clayton-East, 7th Baronet (1846–1925)
- Sir George Frederick Lancelot Clayton-East, 8th Baronet (1872–1926)
- Sir Robert Alan Clayton-East-Clayton, 9th Baronet (1908–1932)
- Sir Harold Dudley Clayton, 10th Baronet Clayton (1877–1951)
- Sir Arthur Harold Clayton, 11th Baronet Clayton (1903–1985)
- Sir David Robert Clayton, 12th Baronet Clayton (1936–2021)
- Sir Robert Philip Clayton, 13th Baronet Clayton (born 1975)

The heir apparent is the current holder's son, William Robert Clayton (born 2008).

== Title succession chart ==
Title succession chart, Clayton baronets (1732 and 1838 creations).

Clayton baronetcy of Marden Park
Sir William Clayton; 1st Baronet died 1744
Robert Clayton; 1706–1706	Robert Clayton; 1707–?	William Clayton; 1710–?	Sir Kenrick Clayton; 2nd Baronet c. 1713 – 1769	William Clayton; 1723–1783
Sir Robert Clayton; 3rd Baronet c. 1740 – 1799	Sir William Clayton; 4th Baronet; 1762–1834
Clayton-East baronetcy of Hall Place
Sir William Clayton; 5th Baronet; 1786–1866	Sir East Clayton-East; 1st Baronet; 1794–1851	John Clayton; 1796–1855	Rice Clayton; 1797–1879	Rev. Augustus Clayton; 1799–1871
William Clayton; 1818–1848	Henry Clayton; 1823–1857	Sir Gilbert Gilbert-East; 2nd Baronet; 1823–1866	Augustus Clayton-East; 1824–1845	Charles Clayton-East; 1826–1866	Frederick Clayton-East; 1828–?	John Clayton; 1833–1913	Richard Clayton; 1833–1914	George Clayton; 1840–1918	Francis Clayton; 1844–1905	Arthur Clayton; 1846–1922	Sir FitzRoy Clayton; 1834–1913
Sir William Clayton; 6th Baronet; 1842–1914	Charles Clayton; 1847–1886	Sir Gilbert Clayton-East; 7th and 3rd Baronet; 1846–1925	George Clayton-East; 1857–1898	Harold Clayton; 1867–1890	Kenrick Clayton; 1896–1909	Sir Harold Clayton; 10th Baronet; 1877–1951
Gilbert Clayton-East; 1869–1924	Sir George Clayton-East; 8th and 4th Baronet; 1872–1926	Sir Arthur Clayton; 11th Baronet; 1903–1985
Sir Robert Clayton- East-Clayton; 9th and 5th Baronet; 1908–1932	Sir David Clayton; 12th Baronet; 1936–2021
Clayton-East baronetcy of Hall Place extinct
Sir Robert Clayton; 13th Baronet born 1975
William Clayton born 2008

== Notes ==
Baronetage of Great Britain
Preceded by Wynne baronets	Clayton baronets of Marden Park; 13 January 1732	Succeeded by Brown baronets
