= Sir William Clayton, 1st Baronet =

English politician (??–1744)

Sir William Clayton, 1st Baronet (died 1744) of Marden Park, Surrey and later Harleyford, was an English politician who sat in the House of Commons from 1715 to 1744.

Clayton was the eldest surviving son of William Clayton of Hambleden, Buckinghamshire. He married Martha Kenrick, the daughter of John Kenrick, a London merchant. He was the nephew and heir of Sir Robert Clayton, a wealthy banker and former Lord Mayor of London who had bought the manor of Bletchingley in 1677, and with it control of both seats in the parliamentary borough of Bletchingley.

Clayton returned himself as a Member of Parliament (MP) for this rotten borough at the 1715 British general election. He was returned as MP again in 1722, 1727, 1734 and 1741. He voted with the Administration in all known divisions, except when he voted with the opposition in 1719 on the Peerage Bill and in 1730 on the Hessians.

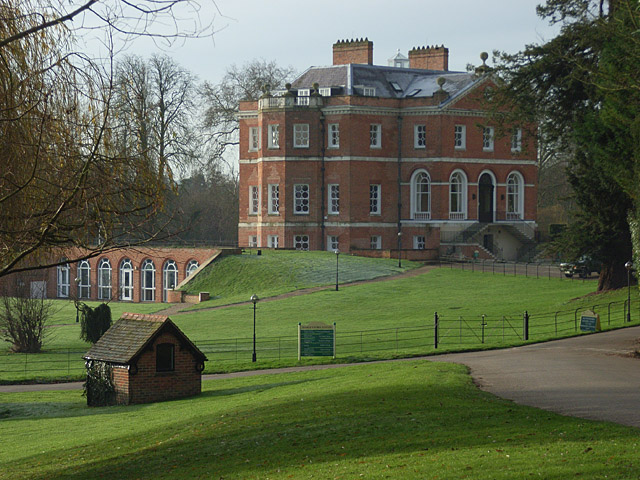
Sir William Clayton bought the Harleyford Estate in 1735.

Clayton was created a baronet of Marden in 1732. In 1735 he also bought the manor of Harleyford, near Great Marlow, which gave him control of one of the two parliamentary seats of the borough of Great Marlow.

Clayton died on 28 December 1744 leaving five sons and five daughters. He was succeeded in the baronetcy by his eldest son, Kenrick, who was in turn succeeded by his son Robert. Robert died childless, and the baronetcy passed to the 1st baronet's grandson William, who was the son of the first baronet's younger son William. Clayton's daughter Anne married John Thomas, who was a family tutor and later became Bishop of Rochester.

Parliament of the United Kingdom
Preceded by George Evelyn; Thomas Onslow	Member of Parliament for Bletchingley; 1715–1744; With: George Evelyn to 1724; Henry Herbert 1724–27; Sir Orlando Bridgeman, Bt from 1727	Succeeded by Sir Orlando Bridgeman, Bt; William Clayton (son)
Baronetage of Great Britain
New creation	Baronet (Marden Park); 1732–1744	Succeeded by Kenrick Clayton
