= Kenrick Clayton =

English politician (c.1713–1769)

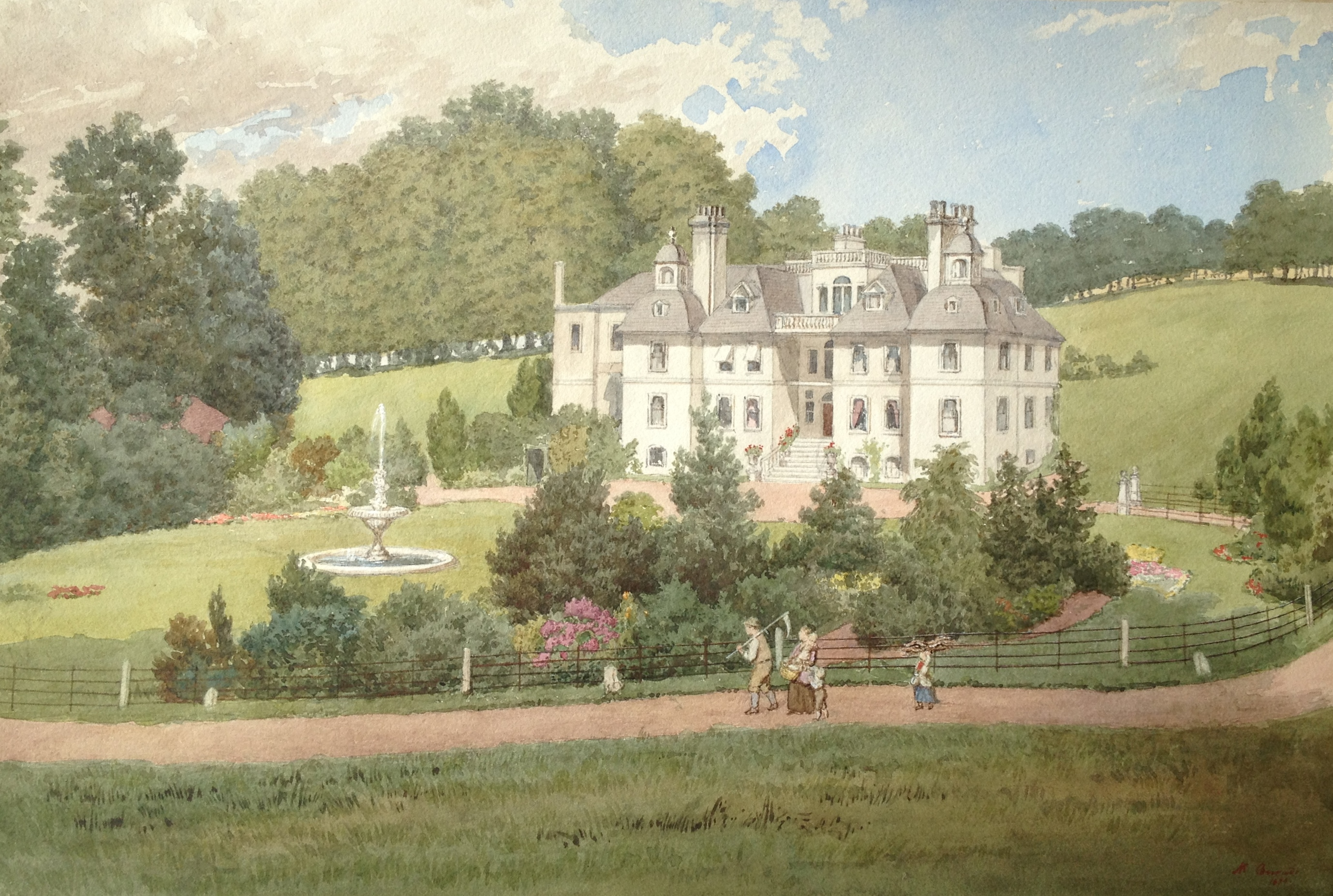
Marden Park, 1869

Sir Kenrick Clayton, 2nd Baronet (c. 1713 – 10 March 1769) of Marden Park, Surrey, was an English politician who sat in the House of Commons of Great Britain from 1734 to 1769.

Clayton was the eldest surviving son of Sir William Clayton, 1st Baronet (died 1744), and his wife Martha Kenrick, the daughter of John Kenrick, a London merchant. He was admitted at Corpus Christi College, Cambridge on 9 May 1732. He married Henrietta Maria Herring, daughter of Henry Herring, director of Bank of England on 13 February 1736.

Clayton's father inherited from his uncle, Sir Robert Clayton, the manor of Bletchingley, and thereby controlled both seats in the rotten borough of Bletchingley.

Clayton was returned with his father as Member of Parliament (MP) for Bletchingley on his father's interest at the 1734 British general election, and again at the 1741 British general election. He succeeded to the baronetcy on his father's death in 1744, and inherited his father's controlling interest both in Bletchingley and in the parliamentary borough of Great Marlow. He was returned at the subsequent general elections in 1747 and 1754 with his brother William. In about 1750 Lord Egmont describer the Claytons as 'strange people and not to be depended upon' but observed that their attendance was infrequent and they were irresolute in opposition. In 1753 Clayton applied for a church preferment for his brother-in-law Rev. John Thomas, which was granted the following year after Pelham had pointed out to Newcastle that he had a controlling interest in two parliamentary seats. He was returned for Bletchingly again in 1761 and in 1768 sat with his son Robert.

Clayton died on 10 March 1769 leaving a son and two daughters. He was succeeded in the baronetcy by his son Robert who died childless. The baronetcy then passed to Clayton's nephew William, son of his brother William.

Parliament of Great Britain
Preceded by Sir William Clayton, Bt; Sir Orlando Bridgeman, Bt	Member of Parliament for Bletchingley; 1734 – 1769; With: Sir William Clayton, Bt to 1745; William Clayton (brother) 1745–61; Charles Whitworth 1761–68 (Sir) Robert Clayton from 1768	Succeeded by Sir Robert Clayton, Bt; Frederick Standert
Baronetage of Great Britain
Preceded by William Clayton	Baronet (Marden Park); 1744 – 1769	Succeeded by Robert Clayton
