= John Kenrick =

John Kenrick may refer to:

- John Kendrick (American sea captain) (c.1740–1794), American sea captain, explorer and trader
- John Kenrick (MP) (1735–1799), British politician for Bletchingley
- John Kenrick (historian) (1788–1877), British classical period historian
- John Kenrick (theatre writer) (born 1959), American theatre writer and film historian
