= Philip Francis (politician) =

British politician, pamphleteer and colonial administrator (1740–1818)

Sir Philip Francis GCB
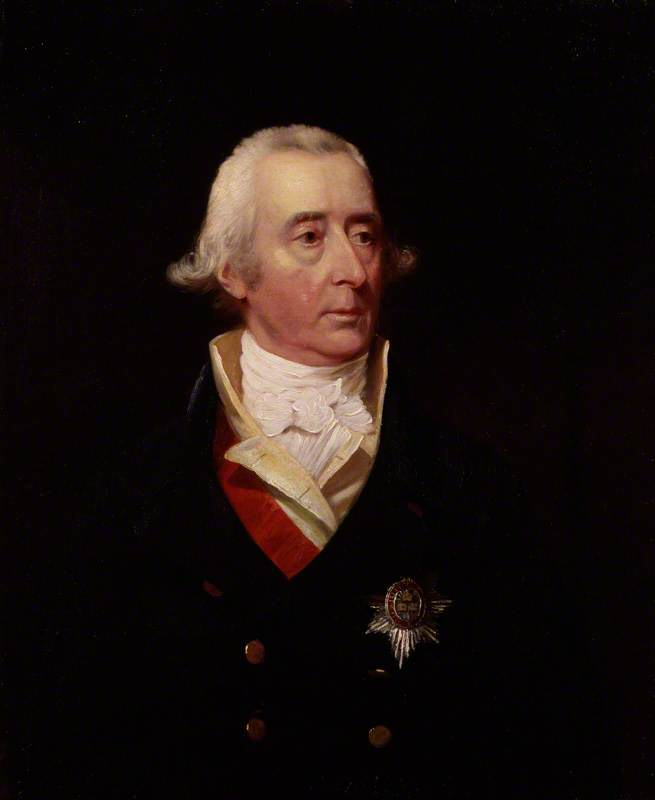
- Portrait by James Lonsdale, c. 1808

Councilor on the Supreme Council of Bengal
- In office 20 October 1774 – 3 December 1780

Member of Parliament for Appleby
- In office 1802–1807
- Preceded by: Robert Adair
- Succeeded by: Viscount Howick

Member of Parliament for Bletchingley
- In office 1790–1796
- Preceded by: John Kenrick
- Succeeded by: Sir Lionel Copley, Bt

Member of Parliament for Yarmouth
- In office 1784–1790
- Preceded by: Sir Thomas Rumbold, Bt
- Succeeded by: Edward Rushworth

Personal details
- Born: 22 October 1740 Dublin, Kingdom of Ireland (present-day Ireland)
- Died: 23 December 1818 (aged 78)
- Party: Whig

Sir Philip Francis, GCB (22 October 1740 – 23 December 1818) was a British Whig politician, pamphleteer and colonial administrator best known for being the possible identity of the anonymous writer Junius. A strong opponent of East India Company official Warren Hastings, Francis' accusations against him led to Hastings' impeachment by the Parliament of Great Britain.

== Early life ==
Born in Dublin, he was the only son of Dr Philip Francis (c. 1708–1773), a man of some literary celebrity in his time, known by his translations of Horace, Aeschines and Demosthenes. He received the rudiments of an excellent education at a free school in Dublin, and afterwards spent a year or two (1751–1752) under his father's roof at Skeyton Rectory, Norfolk, and elsewhere, and for a short time he had Edward Gibbon as a fellow-pupil. In March 1753, he entered St Paul's School, London, where he remained for three and a half years, becoming a proficient classical scholar.

In 1756, immediately on his leaving school, he was appointed to a junior clerkship in the secretary of state's office by Henry Fox (afterwards Lord Holland), with whose family Dr Francis was at that time on intimate terms; and this post he retained under the succeeding administration. In 1758 he was employed as secretary to General Bligh in the expedition against Cherbourg; and in the same capacity he accompanied the Earl of Kinnoull on his special embassy to the court of Portugal in 1760.

In January 1769 Philip Francis returned to London from a 'riotous fortnight' in Bath where he lived as a 'raike'; later that year he became one of the original shareholders in the project to build a new Assembly Rooms in the city.

== Entry into politics ==
In 1761, he became personally known to William Pitt the Elder who, recognising his ability and discretion, made use of his services as private amanuensis from time to time. In 1762 he was appointed to a principal clerkship in the war office, where he formed a warm friendship with Christopher D'Oyly, Deputy-Secretary at War, whose dismissal from office in 1772 was hotly resented by Junius. On 27 February 1762 he married Elizabeth Macrabie, the daughter of a retired London merchant. His daughter, Catherine Francis (d. 11 September 1823) married George James Cholmondeley (b. 22 February 1752, d. 5 November 1830), the son of Mary Woffington.

His official duties brought him into direct relations with many who were well versed in the politics of the time. In 1763 the great constitutional questions arising out of the arrest of Wilkes began to be sharply canvassed. It was natural that Francis, who from a very early age had been in the habit of writing occasionally to the newspapers, should be eager to take an active part in the discussion, though his position as a government official made it necessary that his intervention should be carefully disguised.

== Political career ==
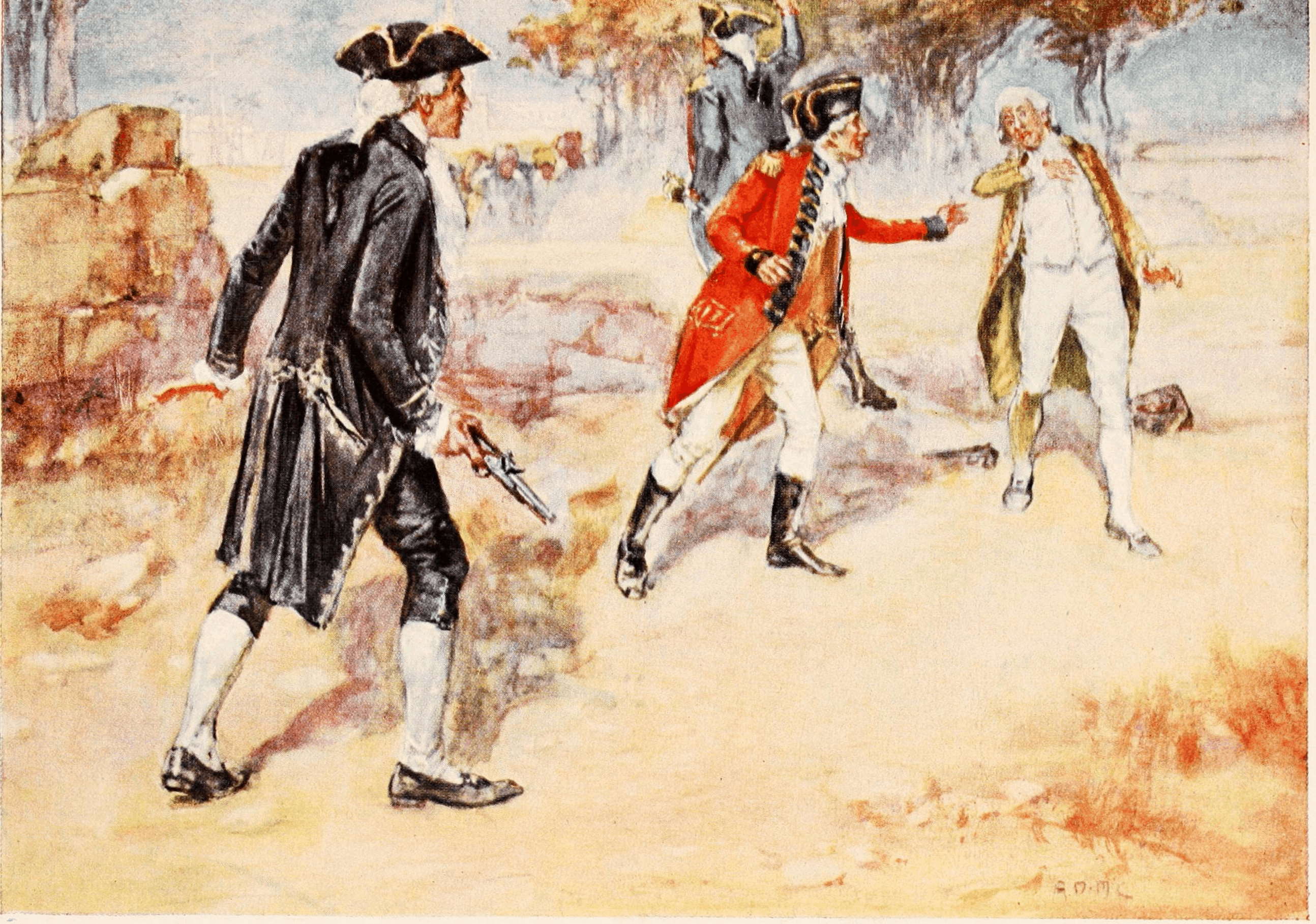
Duel between Warren Hastings and Philip Francis.

He is known to have written to the Public Ledger and Public Advertiser, as an advocate of the popular cause, on many occasions about and after the year 1763; he frequently attended debates in both Houses of Parliament, especially when American questions were being discussed; and between 1769 and 1771 he is also known to have been favourable to the scheme for the overthrow of the Grafton government and afterwards of that of Lord North, and for persuading or forcing Lord Chatham into power. In January 1769 the first of the Letters of Junius appeared, and the series continued till 21 January 1772. They had been preceded by others under signatures such as "Candor", "Father of Candor", "Anti-Sejanus", "Lucius", and "Nemesis".

The authorship of the letters has been assigned to Francis on a variety of grounds, including a computer-aided analysis of the Junius texts in the 1960s. Comparing stylistic patterns from the letters with attributed writings of the period allowed a reasonable statistical conclusion to be drawn that Francis was by far the most likely author. Some evidence to support the claim of Sir Philip Francis is given in Macaulay's History of England in which Macaulay mentions the likely reference to Henry Luttrell, who although obscure to the British of the 1770s, would have been well known to the Irish and particularly to Sir Philip Francis who spent the early part of his life near Luttrellstown.

In March 1772 Francis finally left the war office, and in July of the same year he left England for a tour through France, Germany and Italy, which lasted until the following December. On his return he was contemplating emigration to New England, when in June 1773 Lord North, on the recommendation of Lord Barrington, appointed him a member of the newly constituted supreme council of Bengal at a salary of 10,000 pounds per annum. Along with his colleagues Monson and Clavering he reached Calcutta in October 1774, and a long struggle with Warren Hastings, the governor-general, immediately began. These three, actuated probably by petty personal motives, combined to form a majority of the council in harassing opposition to the governor-general's policy; and they even accused him of corruption, mainly on the evidence of Nuncomar.

The death of Monson in 1776, and of Clavering in the following year, made Hastings again supreme in the council. But a dispute with Francis, more than usually embittered, led in August 1780 to a minute being delivered to the council board by Hastings, in which he stated that he judged of the public conduct of Mr Francis by his experience of his private, which he had found to be "void of truth and honor"; such an opinion was aggravated by the various affairs Francis had during his stay in Calcutta, including one with Catherine Grand. A duel was the consequence, in which Francis received a dangerous wound.

The duel between Warren Hastings and Phillip Francis took place in the early hours of 17 August 1780 on the western edge of one of Hastings' summer houses in Calcutta. The two duellists, accompanied by their seconds, stood 14 paces apart with their pistols at the ready. It was at this point, Hastings' second noted, that 'both gentlemen were unacquainted with the modes usually observed on these occasions', in that Francis and Hastings were unfamiliar with how to operate their pistols. Francis stated he had never fired one in his life, while Hastings said he could only remember doing so once. As a result, both had to have their weapons loaded for them by their seconds and Francis had to borrow both a ball and a primer from Hastings, who then allowed Francis the first shot. Francis, with some uncertainty, fired his pistol several times without success, his second again having to intervene. Eventually, Francis' pistol did fire at Hastings but missed, leaving his opponent unscathed. Following this, Hastings fired at Francis and pierced his right side. With Francis lying on the ground, the two then joined hands and expressed regret towards what had happened.

Though Francis' recovery was rapid and complete, he did not choose to prolong his stay abroad. He arrived in England in October 1781, and was received with little favour.

Little is known of the nature of his occupations during the next two years, except that he was untiring in his efforts to procure first the recall, and afterwards the impeachment, of his hitherto triumphant adversary. In 1783 Fox produced his India Bill, which led to the overthrow of the coalition government. In 1784 Francis was returned to the House of Commons as Member of Parliament (MP) for the borough of Yarmouth, Isle of Wight; and although he took an opportunity to disclaim every feeling of personal animosity towards Hastings, this did not prevent him, on the return of the latter in 1785, from doing all in his power to bring forward and support the charges which ultimately led to the impeachment resolutions of 1787. Although excluded by a majority of the House of Commons from the list of the managers of that impeachment, Francis was nonetheless its most energetic promoter, supplying his friends Edmund Burke and Richard Sheridan with all the materials for their eloquent orations and burning invectives.

At the general election of 1790 he was returned member for Bletchingley. He sympathised warmly and actively with the French revolutionary doctrines, expostulating with Burke on his vehement denunciation of the same. In 1793 he supported Earl Grey's motion for a return to the old constitutional system of representation, and so earned the title to be regarded as one of the earliest promoters of the cause of parliamentary reform; and he was one of the founders of the Society of the Friends of the People.

== Later life ==
The acquittal of Hastings in April 1795 disappointed Francis of the governor-generalship, and in 1798 he had to submit to the additional mortification of a defeat in the general election. He was once more successful, however, in 1802, when he sat for Appleby, and it seemed as if the great ambitions of his life were about to be realised when the Whig party came into power in 1806. His disappointment was great when the governor-generalship was, owing to party exigencies, conferred on Sir Gilbert Elliot (Lord Minto); he declined, it is said, soon afterwards the government of the Cape, but accepted a KB. Though re-elected for Appleby in 1806, he failed to secure a seat in the following year; and the remainder of his life was spent in comparative privacy.

Among the later productions of his pen were, besides the Plan of a Reform in the Election of the House of Commons, pamphlets entitled:

- Proceedings in the House of Commons on the Slave Trade (1796),
- Reflections on the Abundance of Paper in Circulation and the Scarcity of Specie (1810),
- Historical Questions Exhibited (1818), and
- Letter to Earl Grey on the Policy of Great Britain and the Allies towards Norway (1814).

His first wife, by whom he had six children, died in 1806, and in 1814 he married his second wife, Emma Watkins, who long survived him, and who left voluminous manuscripts relating to his biography. In his domestic relations he was exemplary, and he lived on terms of mutual affection with a wide circle of friends.

=== Bibliography ===
For the evidence identifying Francis with Junius see the article Identity of Junius, and the authorities there cited.

- Memoirs of Sir Philip Francis, with Correspondence and Journals, by Joseph Parkes and Herman Merivale (2 vols., London, 1867);
- The Francis Letters, edited by Beata Francis and Eliza Keary (2 vols., London, 1901);
- James Fitzjames Stephen, The Story of Nuncomar and the Impeachment of Sir Elijah Impey (2 vols., London, 1885);
- Lord Macaulay's Essay on Warren Hastings;
- George Bruce Malleson, Life of Warren Hastings (London, 1894);
- G. W. Forrest, The Administration of Warren Hastings, 1772–1785 (Calcutta, 1892);
- Leslie Stephen, article on Francis in the Dictionary of National Biography vol. xx.

For Francis's influence on Bengal and his rivalry with Hastings, see "Chapter 3: The Personality and Politics of Philip Francis" in Ranajit Guha, A Rule of Property for Bengal, Duke Univ. Press, 1996.

== Arms ==
Coat of arms of Philip Francis
Notes Granted 24 November 1806 Crest Out of a ducal coronet Or a demi-lion rampant Sable charged on the shoulder with a shamrock Or holding in his paws a garb of the last. Escutcheon Per bend sinister Sable and Or a lion rampant counterchanged charged on the shoulder with a shamrock counterchanged of the field. Orders Order of the Bath (appointed Knight Companion in 1806, converted to Knight Grand Cross in 1815)

== Sources ==
Parliament of Great Britain
Preceded by Sir Thomas Rumbold, Bt; Edward Morant	Member of Parliament for Yarmouth; 1784–1790; With: Edward Morant to 1787; Thomas Clarke Jervoise from 1787	Succeeded by Edward Rushworth; Thomas Clarke Jervoise
Preceded by John Kenrick; Sir Robert Clayton, Bt	Member of Parliament for Bletchingley; 1790–1796; With: Sir Robert Clayton, Bt	Succeeded by Sir Lionel Copley, Bt; John Stein
Parliament of the United Kingdom
Preceded by Robert Adair; John Courtenay	Member of Parliament for Appleby; 1802–1807; With: John Courtenay	Succeeded by Viscount Howick; James Ramsay Cuthbert
