= Charles Whitworth (MP) =

British politician (c. 1721 – 1778)

Sir Charles Whitworth

Member of Parliament for Saltash
- In office 1775–1778 Serving with Grey Cooper
- Preceded by: Thomas Bradshaw; Grey Cooper
- Succeeded by: Grey Cooper; Henry Strachey

Member of Parliament for East Looe
- In office 1774–1775 Serving with John Buller
- Preceded by: John Buller; John Burling
- Succeeded by: John Buller; Thomas Graves

Member of Parliament for Minehead
- In office 1768–1774 Serving with Henry Fownes-Luttrell
- Preceded by: Henry Shiffner; The Earl of Thomond
- Succeeded by: Henry Fownes-Luttrell; John Fownes Luttrell

Member of Parliament for Bletchingley
- In office 1761–1768 Serving with Sir Kenrick Clayton
- Preceded by: Sir Kenrick Clayton; William Clayton
- Succeeded by: Sir Kenrick Clayton; Robert Clayton

Member of Parliament for Minehead
- In office 1747–1761 Serving with Percy Wyndham-O'Brien, Daniel Boone
- Preceded by: Thomas Carew; John Periam
- Succeeded by: Henry Shiffner; The Earl of Thomond

Personal details
- Born: c. 1721
- Died: 21 August 1778 (aged 56–57)
- Spouse: Martha Shelley (m. 1749; died 1778)
- Relations: Charles Whitworth, 1st Baron Whitworth (uncle); Sir Henry Russell, 2nd Baronet (grandson); Charles Russell (grandson)
- Parent(s): Francis Whitworth; Joan Windham
- Education: Westminster School

Sir Charles Whitworth (c. 1721 – 21 August 1778) was a British politician who sat in the House of Commons for 31 years from 1747 to 1778. He was known for his expertise in statistics and finance.

== Early life ==
Whitworth was the son of Joan Windham of Clarewell, Gloucestershire, and Francis Whitworth, Member of Parliament for Minehead from 1723 to 1742 and was educated at Westminster School and at Lincoln's Inn. His paternal uncle was Charles Whitworth, 1st Baron Whitworth.

== Career ==
Whitworth represented the constituencies of Minehead from 1747 until 1761, and Bletchingley until 1768, in which year he was knighted. He then represented Minehead until 1774, East Looe until 1775 and Saltash until his death in 1778. He served in the army for a short time and was made lieutenant-governor of Gravesend and Tilbury for life in 1758. Whitworth was Chairman of Ways and Means from 1768 until his death.

The major contribution made by Sir Charles to the statistics of Great Britain consisted of the production of the first complete Balance of Trade (Visible trade) for the country together with individual commercial accounts of Great Britain and all known countries during the period 1697–1773, a major task he completed two years before his death.

Whitworth was an active early member of the Society for the Encouragement of Arts, Manufactures and Commerce in 1754.

== Personal life ==
In 1749, Whitworth married Martha Shelley (d. 1786), the daughter of Richard Shelley, a commissioner of the stamp office. Together, they had three sons and four daughters, including:

- Charles Whitworth, 1st Earl Whitworth (1752–1825), who married Arabella Diana, Duchess of Dorset (née Cope), daughter of Sir Charles Cope, Bt. and widow of John Sackville, 3rd Duke of Dorset, in 1801.
- Catharine Whitworth (d. 1805), who married Philip Cade in 1761. They divorced in 1772 and she married Henry Aylmer, 4th Baron Aylmer, son of Henry Aylmer, 3rd Baron Aylmer, in 1774. After his death in 1785, she married Howell Price in 1787. She married Bowles sometime after 1787.
- Priscilla Whitworth (1759–1833), who married Sir Bellingham Graham, 6th Baronet, son of Sir Bellingham Graham, 5th Baronet, in 1785.
- Anna Barbara Whitworth (d. 1814), who married Sir Henry Russell, 1st Baronet, in 1782.

Sir Charles died on 22 August 1778.

=== Descendants ===
Through his youngest daughter Anna, he was a grandfather of Sir Henry Russell, 2nd Baronet, Charles Russell (MP for Reading), Francis Whitworth Russell (who married Jane Anne Catherine Brodie), Rev. Whitworth Russell (who married Frances Carpenter), George Lake Russell (who married Lady Caroline Pery, a daughter of the 1st Earl of Limerick), Katherine Russell (who married Henry Jones), Caroline Russell (who married Commander Henry Fortescue, grandson of the 2nd Baron Fortescue), Rose Aylmer Russell (who married Henry Porter), and Henrietta Russell (who married Thomas Greene of Whittington Hall, MP for Lancaster).

Parliament of Great Britain
Preceded by Thomas Carew; John Periam	Member of Parliament for Minehead; 1747–1761; With: Percy Wyndham-O'Brien 1747–54; Daniel Boone 1754–61	Succeeded by Henry Shiffner; The Earl of Thomond
Preceded by Sir Kenrick Clayton; William Clayton	Member of Parliament for Bletchingley; 1761–1768; With: Sir Kenrick Clayton	Succeeded by Sir Kenrick Clayton; Robert Clayton
Preceded by Henry Shiffner; The Earl of Thomond	Member of Parliament for Minehead; 1768–1774; With: Henry Fownes-Luttrell	Succeeded by Henry Fownes-Luttrell; John Fownes Luttrell
Preceded by John Buller; John Burling	Member of Parliament for East Looe; 1774–1775; With: John Buller	Succeeded by John Buller; Thomas Graves
Preceded by Thomas Bradshaw; Grey Cooper	Member of Parliament for Saltash; 1775–1778; With: Grey Cooper	Succeeded by Grey Cooper; Henry Strachey
