= John Nicholls (MP) =

English lawyer and politician

John Nicholls (c. 1745–1832) was an English lawyer and politician.

Nuchollas was the son of Frank Nicholls, who was a physician to King George II. His mother Elizabeth was a daughter of the physician Richard Mead.

He was educated at Exeter College, Oxford and at Lincoln's Inn, where he was called to the bar in 1767.

He married a granddaughter of Edmund Gibson, the Bishop of London from 1723 to 1748.

He was a Member of Parliament (MP) for Bletchingley from 1783 to 1787, and for Tregony from 1796 to 1802.

Parliament of Great Britain
Preceded by Sir Robert Clayton, Bt; John Kenrick	Member of Parliament for Bletchingley; 1783–1787; With: John Kenrick	Succeeded by Sir Robert Clayton, Bt; John Kenrick
Preceded by Matthew Montagu; Hon. Robert Stewart	Member of Parliament for Tregony; 1796–1800; With: Sir Lionel Copley, Bt	Succeeded by Parliament of the United Kingdom
Parliament of the United Kingdom
Preceded by Parliament of Great Britain	Member of Parliament for Tregony; 1801–1802; With: Sir Lionel Copley, Bt	Succeeded by Charles Cockerell; Marquess of Blandford
