= Lewis Bayly Wallis =

British politician

Lewis Bayly Wallis (1775 – 10 August 1848) was an officer in the British Army and briefly a Member of Parliament.

== Biography ==
He was born Lewis Bayly in 1775, the only son of Sir Nicholas Bayly, 2nd Baronet, by his second wife Anne Hunter. After his father's death in 1782 the London solicitor Albany Wallis became his guardian. On 31 December 1791 he joined the Army as a cornet in the 3rd Dragoon Guards, and became captain of an independent company of foot on 19 March 1793, transferring to Edmeston's Regiment of Foot (95th) on 16 November that year. He purchased his promotion to major in the 95th Foot in 1794 and was granted rank as a lieutenant-colonel on 2 February 1796.

In 1799 Sir Robert Clayton died. He was one of the members of Parliament for the rotten borough of Ilchester, and Bayly was returned to Parliament in his place on the nomination of Albany Wallis's business partner Richard Troward, who owned the seat. Wallis died on 3 September 1800, leaving Lewis Bayly as his heir, and on 17 September Bayly was granted a Royal Licence to assume the surname and arms of Wallis in addition to those of Bayly. Bayly Wallis was not an active MP and in April 1802 he sold his interest in the borough to Sir William Manners. He did not stand in the general election later that year.

On 3 June 1802 Bayly Wallis married Frances, widow of Lieutenant-Colonel Thomas Blacket Bosville and daughter of the painter Benjamin Wilson. They had one daughter, Louisa, who married her cousin Belford Hinton Wilson. In 1806 he was appointed Sheriff of Cardiganshire. Though on half-pay since 1798, he continued to advance in rank through the Army, becoming colonel on 1 January 1805, major-general on 25 July 1810, lieutenant-general on 12 August 1819 and general on 10 January 1837. On 10 August 1848 General Bayly Wallis died aboard his yacht at Rottingdean; his heir was his grandson Robert Belford Wallis-Wilson.

Parliament of Great Britain
Preceded by Sir Robert Clayton; William Dickinson	Member of Parliament for Ilchester; 1799–1800; With: William Dickinson	Succeeded by Parliament of the United Kingdom
Parliament of the United Kingdom
Preceded by Parliament of Great Britain	Member of Parliament for Ilchester; 1801–1802; With: William Dickinson	Succeeded by William Hunter; Thomas Plummer
Honorary titles
Preceded by John Lloyd Williams	High Sheriff of Cardiganshire; 1806	Succeeded by Thomas Smith
