= Harleyford Manor =

Country house in Buckinghamshire, England

Coordinates: 51.553267°N 0.808941°W

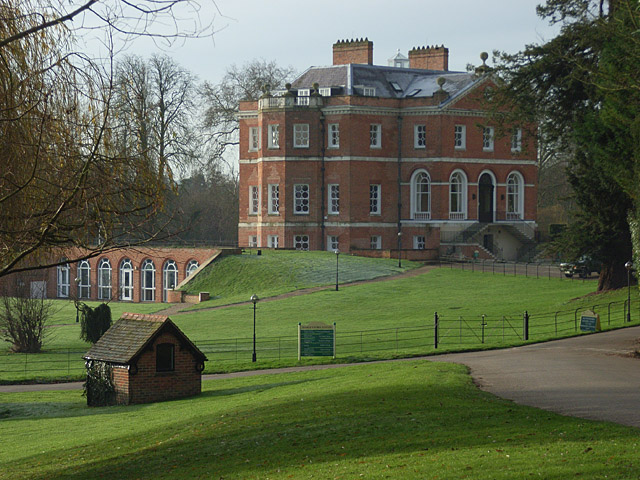
Harleyford Manor

Harleyford Manor is a country house near Marlow in Buckinghamshire.

The house is listed Grade I on the National Heritage List for England, and its gardens are also listed Grade II on the Register of Historic Parks and Gardens.

The urn to the south west of the house, the ice house to the north east, and the dairy to the north, and the temple to the north east are all listed Grade II.

In addition to the buildings, two statues of Robert Clayton, to the west and to the east of the house, are also listed Grade II.

== History ==
The house was designed by Sir Robert Taylor in the Georgian style and built for William Clayton, a Member of Parliament, in 1753. The house remained in the Clayton family until 1950. The present owners, who have owned the property since 1952, converted the property to office use in 1988. They operate a large marina and offer boat mooring services but plan to convert the property into flats.

== The Clayton family ==
The Clayton family who owned Harleyford Manor from the time it was built in 1753 until 1950 were notable wealthy landowners. William Clayton (1718-1783) who was the originator of the house was the second son of Sir William Clayton, 1st Baronet. He was a Member of Parliament for Bletchingley from 1745 to 1761, and for Great Marlow from 1761 to 1783.

He frequently entertained at Harleyford Manor and there are several historical documents which record these occasions. In 1759 Elizabeth Montagu, the notable social reformer made the following comments:

"On Wednesday we dined at Mrs. Clayton's at Harleyford. I think it the most agreeable situation I have seen on the Thames, I mean as a place of residence, every object speaks peace and plenty, the silver Thames glides at the foot of their garden, lofty trees crown the summit, they have fine prospects, sweet lawns, fine cornfields and distant villages."

The Royal family were also visitors to the house. In 1780 a letter records that the King, Queen, Princesses and Princes all visited Harleyford Manor. The King and Queen at this time were George III and Queen Charlotte. Two years later Queen Charlotte records a recent visit that she made to Harleyford Manor. She said.

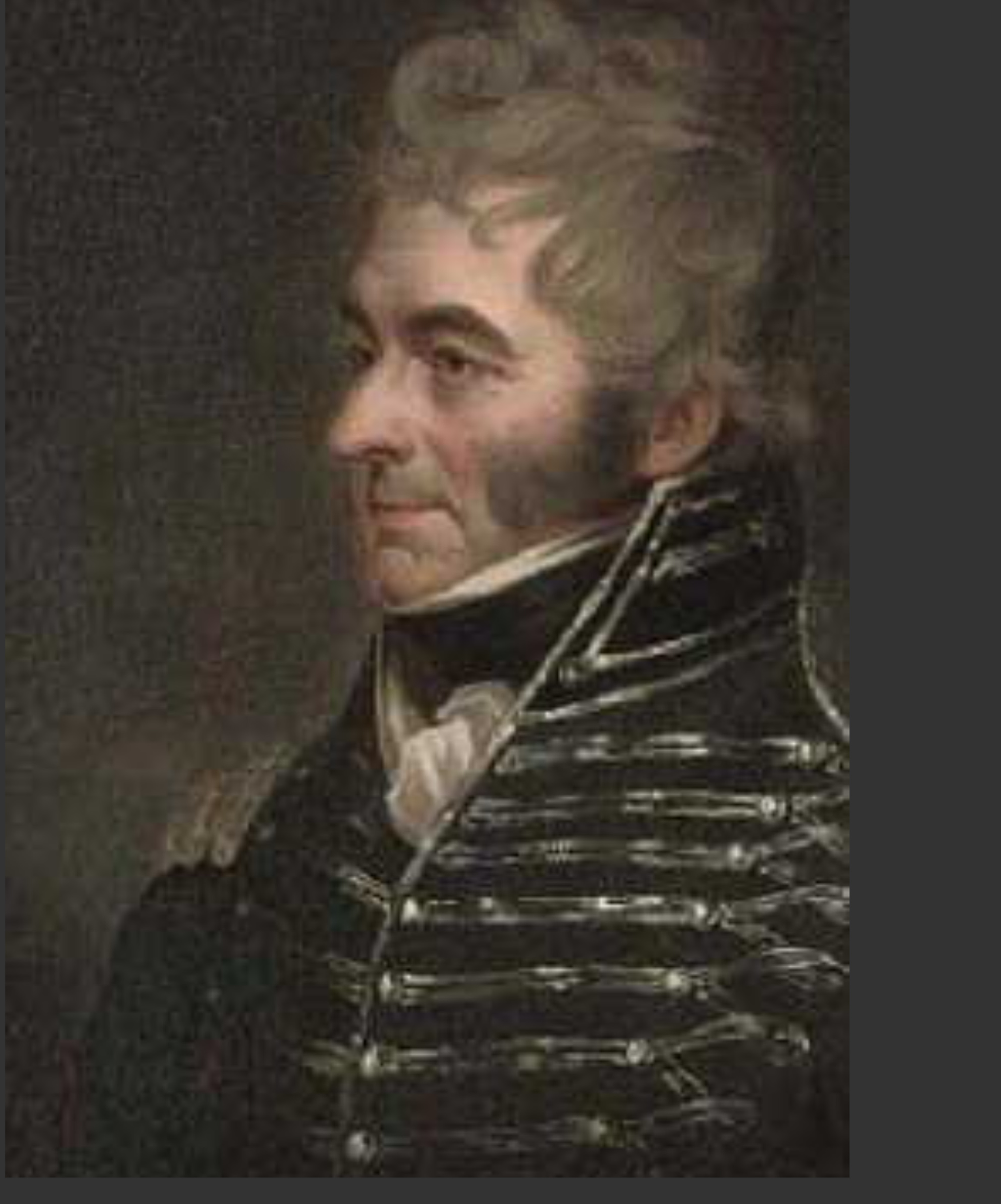
Sir William Clayton 4th Baronet (1762-1834)

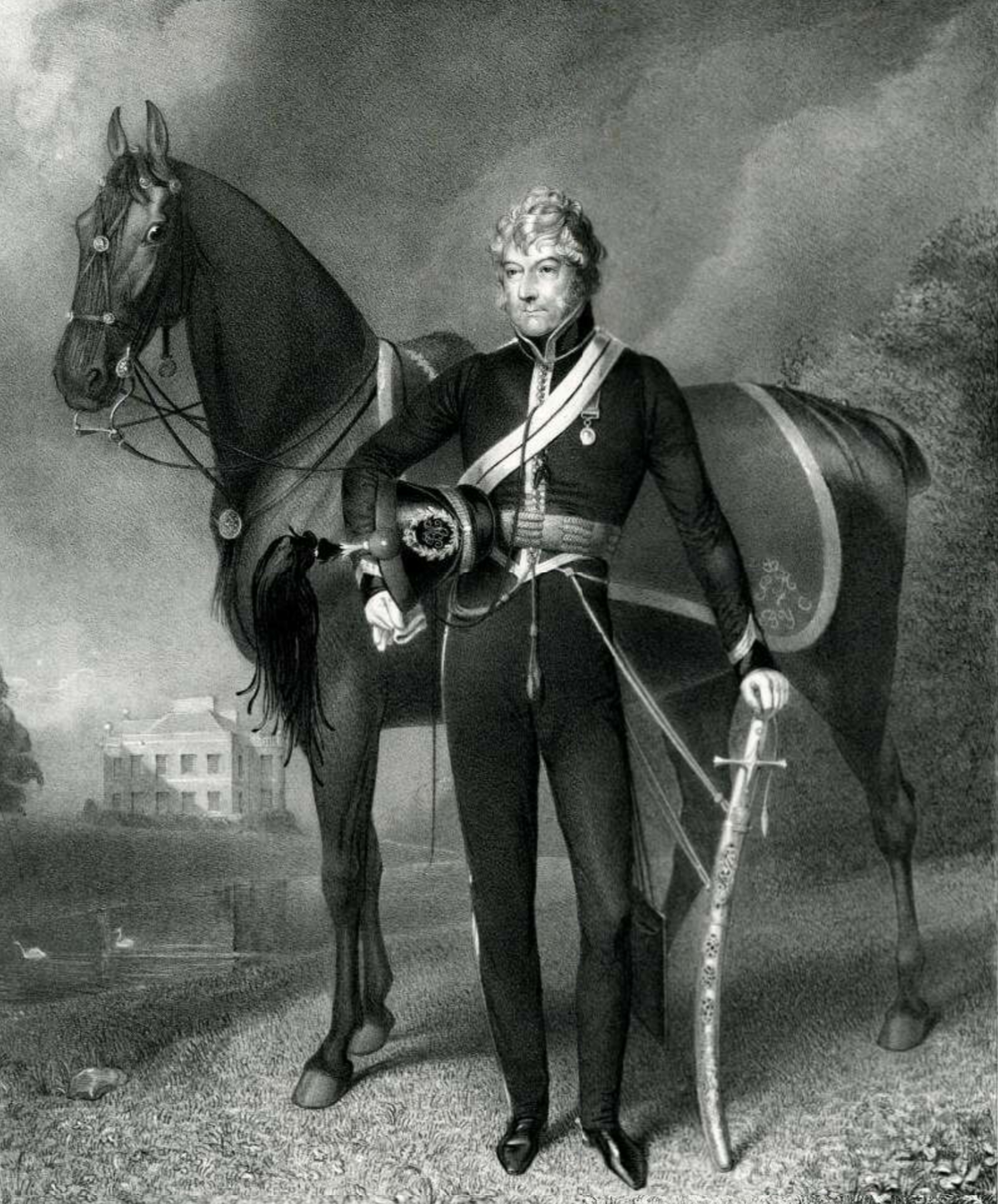
Sir William Claython, 4th Baronet at Harleyford Manor in 1800

"I saw Lady Louise Clayton (William Clayton's wife) in perfect Health both at Harleyford and upon (Windsor) Terrace. Their place is now in the greatest beauty. We went all round it the other day and admired it very much"

When William died in 1783 his son Sir William Clayton (1762-1834) 4th Baronet inherited the property. He was also a Member of Parliament and a wealthy landowner. In 1785 he married Lady Mary East, daughter of Sir William East, 1st Baronet of Hall Place, Berkshire. The couple had five sons and two daughters.

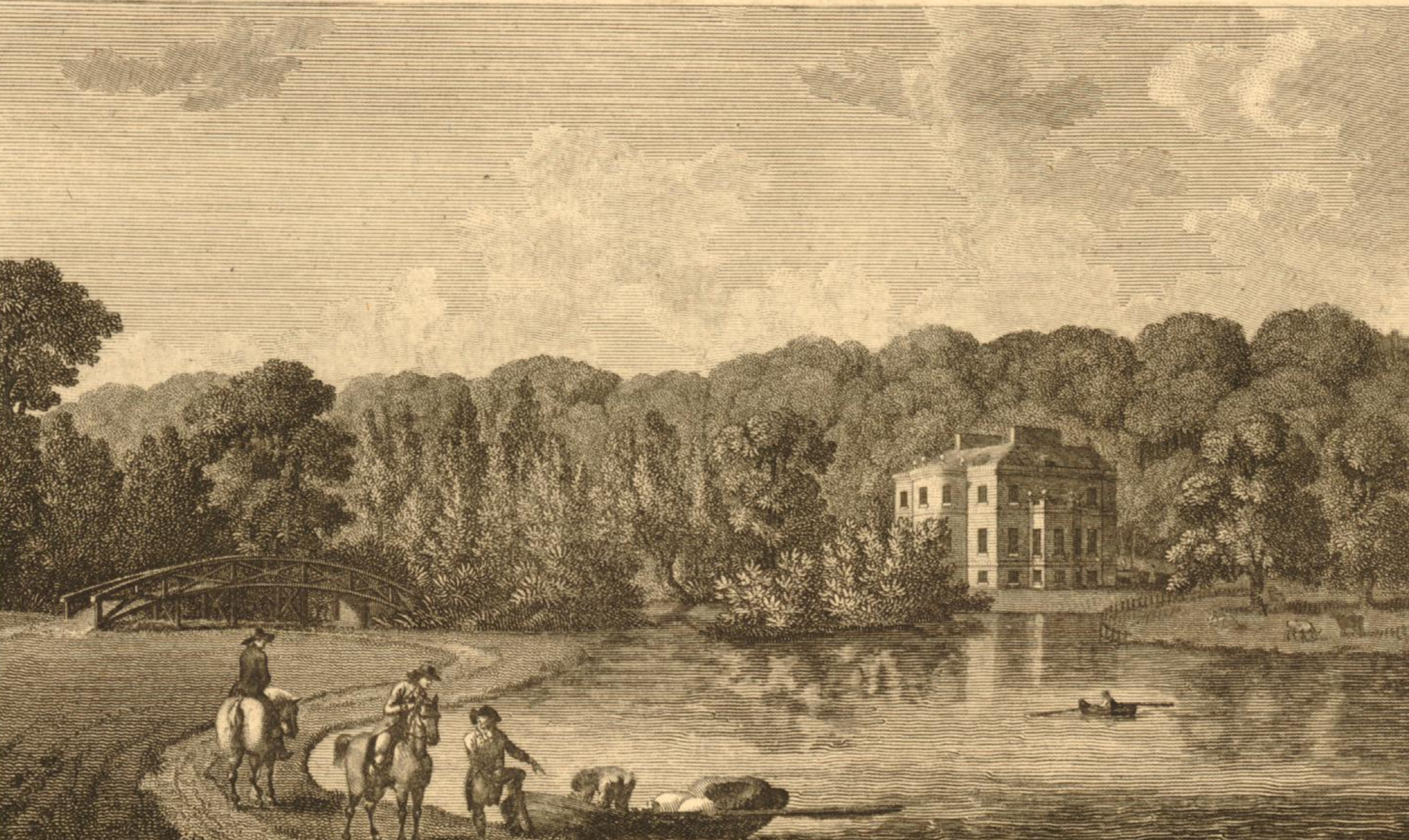
Engraving of Harleyford Manor in "the New Print Magazine" 1795

In 1795 a book called "The New Print Magazine : Being a Collection of Picturesque Views and Beautiful Scenes in the Several Counties of England and Wales" was published. It contained an engraving of Harleyford Manor which is shown.

William was in the 1st Regiment of Buckinghamshire Yeomanry Cavalry in about 1800 and he had several portraits of himself made in his uniform. Two of these are shown. One is a coloured portrait and the other is an engraving of him in front of Harleyford Manor.

When William died in 1834 his eldest son General Sir William Robert Claytonin (1786-1866) inherited the house. He had a prominent career in the army and in 1815 was at the Battle of Waterloo. In 1817 he married Alicia Hugh Massy, daughter. and heir of Lt.-Col. Hugh O'Donel, MP of Tralee. The couple had two sons and two daughters.

Sir William Robert Clayton (1842-1914) 6th Baronet married Aimee Gertrude Mackenzie who was the daughter of Edward Mackenzie of Fawley Court, Henley.

Sir Gilbert Augustus Clayton-East (1846-1925) passed the house to his son Sir George Frederick Lancelot Clayton East (1872-1926) when he died in 1925. His son was the owner for only one year as he died in 1926 and it was inherited by his son Sir Robert Alan Clayton-East-Clayton (1908-1932). He died young at the age of 24 leaving no children. The house was then inherited by his kinsman Sir Harold Dudley Philip Clayton (1877-1951). He sold the house in 1950.
