= Sir Robert Clayton, 3rd Baronet =

English politician

Sir Robert Clayton, 3rd Baronet (c. 1740 – 10 May 1799) was an English politician.

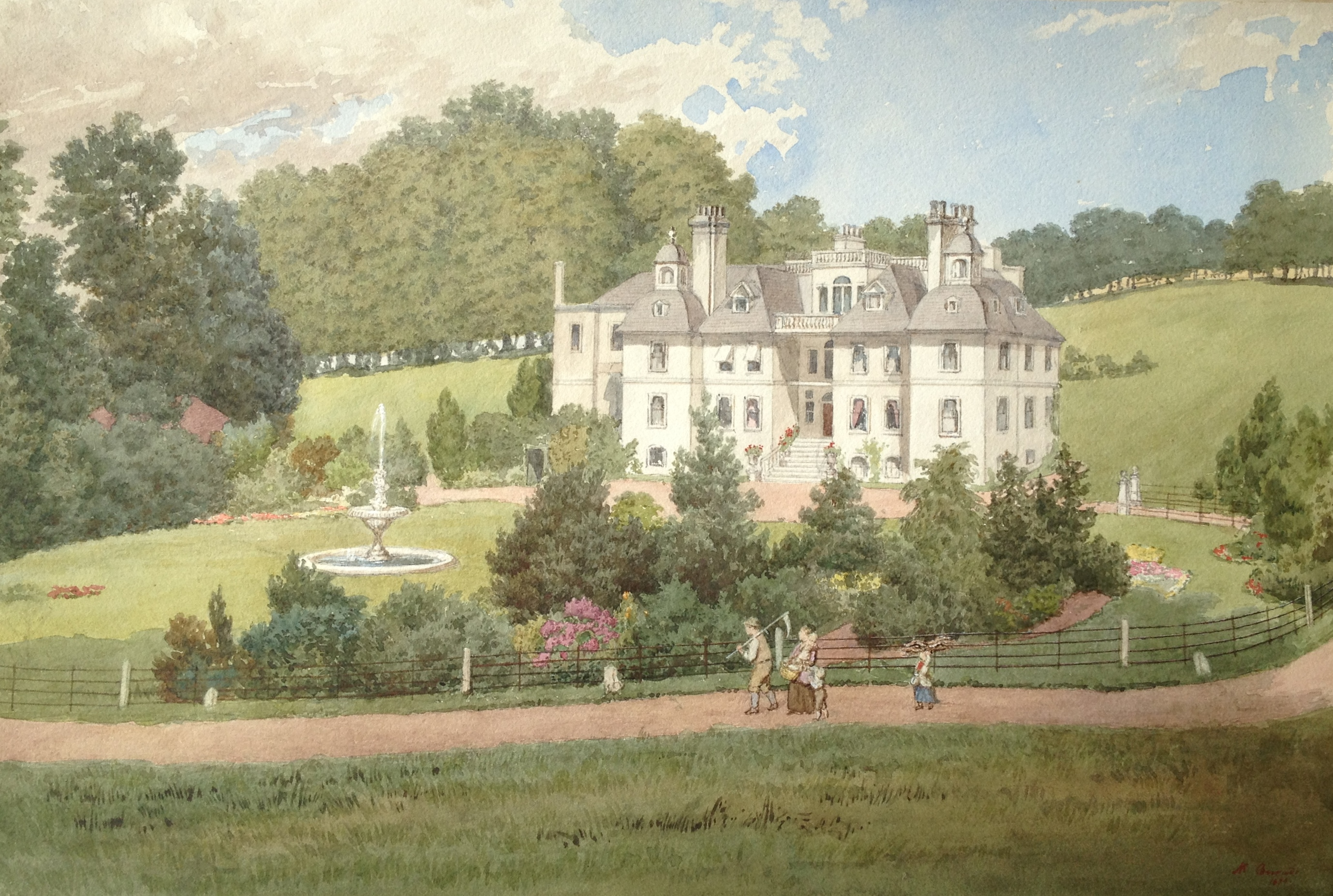
Marden Park Manor, Surrey, 1869

He was the only son of Sir Kenrick Clayton, 2nd Baronet of Marden Park, Surrey, whom he succeeded in 1769.

He was a Member of Parliament (MP) for Bletchingley from 1768 to 1783, for Surrey from 1783 to 1784, for Bletchingley again from 1787 to 1796, and for Ilchester from 1796 until his death.

He died in May 1799. He had married Mary, the daughter of Frederick Standert of Greenwich but left no children. The baronetcy was therefore inherited by his first cousin, Sir William Clayton, 4th Baronet, the son of his father's younger brother William.

Parliament of Great Britain
Preceded by Sir Kenrick Clayton, Bt; Sir Charles Whitworth	Member of Parliament for Bletchingley; 1768–1783; With: Sir Kenrick Clayton, Bt, until 1769; Frederick Standert 1769–1780; John Kenrick from 1780	Succeeded by John Kenrick; John Nicholls
Preceded by Sir Joseph Mawbey, Bt; Viscount Althorp	Member of Parliament for Surrey; 1783–1784; With: Sir Joseph Mawbey, Bt	Succeeded by Sir Joseph Mawbey, Bt; Hon. William Norton
Preceded by John Kenrick; John Nicholls	Member of Parliament for Bletchingley; 1787–1796; With: John Kenrick until 1790; Philip Francis 1790–1796	Succeeded by Sir Lionel Copley, Bt; John Stein
Preceded by Samuel Long; John Harcourt	Member of Parliament for Ilchester; 1796–1799; With: William Dickinson	Succeeded by William Dickinson; Lewis Bayly
Baronetage of Great Britain
Preceded by Kenrick Clayton	Baronet (of Marden Park); 1769–1799	Succeeded by William Clayton
