= Brown baronets of Westminster (1732) =

Escutcheon of the Brown baronets of Westminster

The Brown baronetcy, of the City and Liberty of Westminster, was created in the Baronetage of Great Britain on 11 March 1732 for Robert Brown, an Irish merchant at Venice and Member of Parliament for Ilchester. A special remainder was made, to his two brothers.

Brown died in 1760 and the baronetcy devolved according to the special remainder to his nephew James, son of Colonel James Brown. On the death of the 3rd Baronet, the latter's son, the title became extinct in 1830.

== Brown baronets, of Westminster (1731) ==
- Sir Robert Brown, 1st Baronet (died 1760)
- Sir James O'Hara Brown, 2nd Baronet (c. 1721–1784)
- Sir William Augustus Brown, 3rd Baronet (1764–1830)

== Notes ==
Baronetage of Great Britain
Preceded by Clayton baronets	Brown baronets of Westminster; 11 March 1732	Succeeded by Pleydell baronets
