= Frederick Standert =

British politician

Frederick Standert (c. 1705–1785) was a British politician who sat in the House of Commons between 1769 and 1780.

Standert was educated at Merchant Taylors' School from 1717 to 1719. He married Mary Master, daughter of Sir Harcourt Master, alderman of London on 7 August 1735. By 1740, he was in partnership with a William Standert. He was established as a wine merchant in Martin’s Lane, Cannon Street by 1749 and remained in business until 1780.

Standert was returned as Member of Parliament for Bletchingley at a by-election on 3 April 1769 on the interest of his son-in-law, Sir Robert Clayton. He was returned again in 1774, but did not stand in 1780. He followed Clayton in Parliament and voted consistently with the Opposition. He is not recorded as speaking in Parliament.

Standert died on 24 April 1785. His daughter Mary married Robert Clayton on 1 June 1767.

Parliament of Great Britain
Preceded by Robert Clayton; Sir Kenrick Clayton, Bt	Member of Parliament for Bletchingley; 1769–1784; With: Sir Robert Clayton, Bt	Succeeded by Sir Robert Clayton, Bt; John Kenrick
