= William Clayton (died 1783) =

English politician (c.1718–1783)

William Clayton (c. 1718 – 3 July 1783) of Harleyford Manor, near Great Marlow was an English politician.

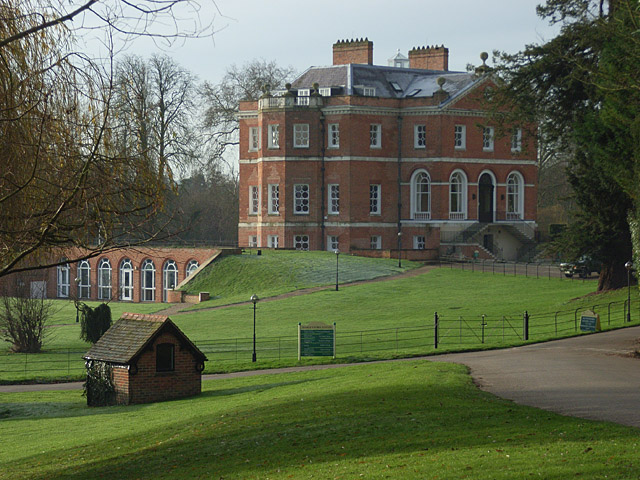
Harleyford Manor

He was the second surviving son of Sir William Clayton, 1st Baronet (died 1744), and the younger brother of Sir Kenrick Clayton, 2nd Baronet. He was educated at the Middle Temple.

He was a Member of Parliament (MP) for Bletchingley from 1745 to 1761, and for Great Marlow from 1761 to 1783.

His son William (1762–1834) succeeded to the baronetcy on the death of his cousin Sir Robert Clayton, 3rd Baronet.

Parliament of Great Britain
Preceded by Sir Kenrick Clayton, Bt; Sir William Clayton, Bt	Member of Parliament for Bletchingley; 1745–1761; With: Sir Kenrick Clayton, Bt	Succeeded by Sir Kenrick Clayton, Bt; Sir Charles Whitworth
Preceded by Daniel Moore; Charles Churchill	Member of Parliament for Great Marlow; 1761–1783; With: William Mathew Burt 1761–68; William Dickinson 1768–74; Sir John Borlase Warren, Bt from 1774	Succeeded by Sir John Borlase Warren, Bt; William Clayton (later 4th Bt)
