= John Kenrick (MP) =

English politician

John Kenrick (1735 – 18 September 1799) was an English politician who sat in the House of Commons of Great Britain from 1780 to 1790.

He was educated at Harrow, at Corpus Christi College, Cambridge and at the Middle Temple, where he was called to the bar in 1759, and became a bencher in 1792.

He was Clerk of the Deliveries of the Ordnance between 1780 and 1783.

He was elected at the 1780 general election as a Member of Parliament (MP) for the rotten borough of Bletchingley in Surrey. The previous year, he had purchased the succession rights to the manor and borough from his cousin Sir Robert Clayton, Bt, and Clayton again returned him for Bletchingley in 1784. However, the two men fell out when Clayton tried unsuccessfully to revoke the sale, and although Kenrick won the court case, Clayton did not return him to Parliament in 1790.

Parliament of Great Britain
Preceded by Sir Robert Clayton, Bt; Frederick Standert	Member of Parliament for Bletchingley; 1780 – 1790; With: Sir Robert Clayton, Bt to 1783; John Nicholls 1783–87; Sir Robert Clayton, Bt from 1787	Succeeded by Sir Robert Clayton, Bt; Philip Francis
Political offices
Preceded by Sir Henry Strachey, 1st Baronet	Clerk of the Deliveries of the Ordnance; 1780–1783	Succeeded by Thomas Baillie
