= John Thomas (bishop of Rochester) =

English churchman

Right Reverend John Thomas
- Bishop of Rochester
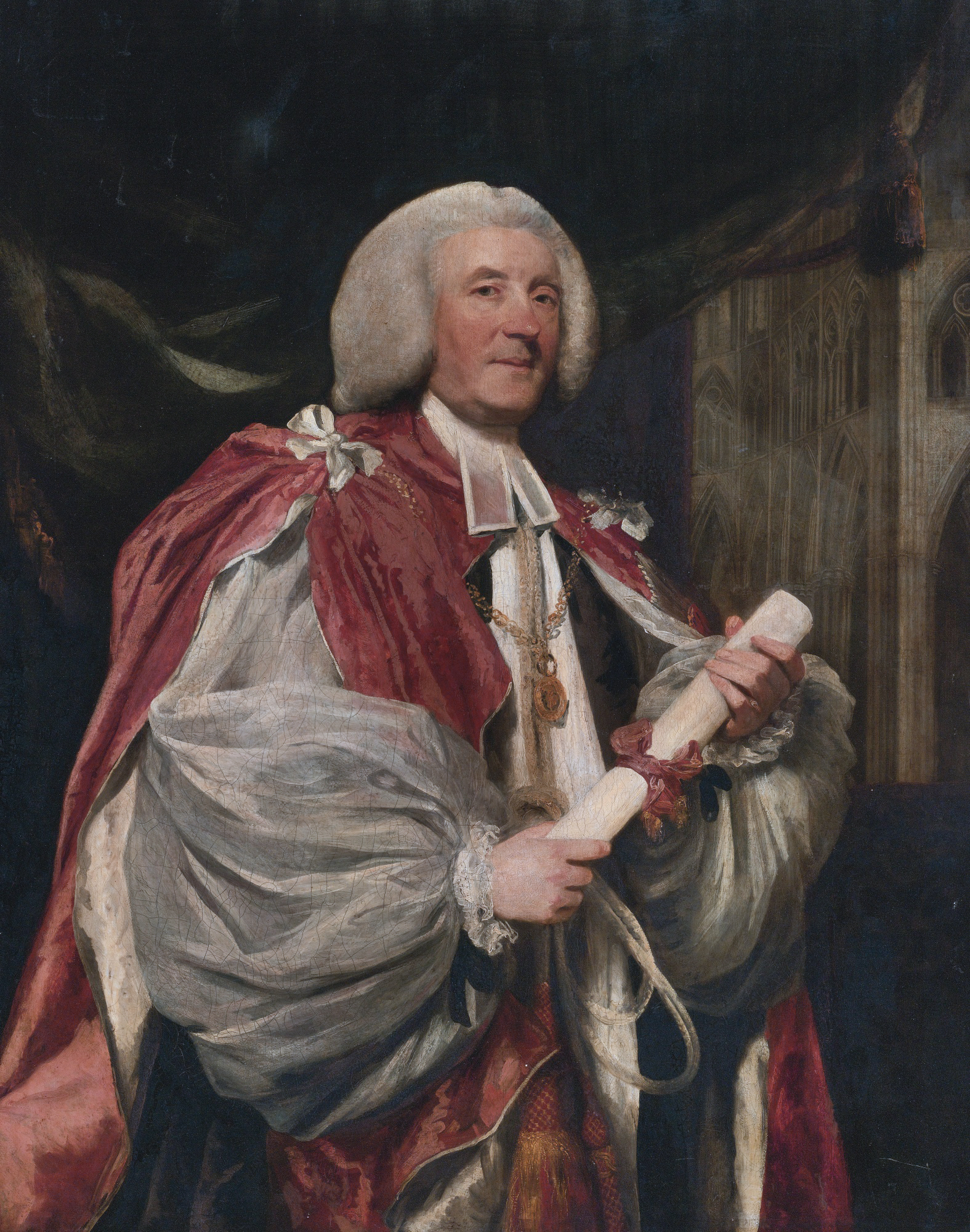
- Portrait by Joshua Reynolds
- Church: Church of England
- Diocese: Rochester
- Elected: 1774
- Term ended: 1793 (death)
- Predecessor: Zachary Pearce
- Successor: Samuel Horsley
- Other posts: Dean of Westminster; 1768

Orders
- Ordination: 25 September 1737 (priest)
- Consecration: 13 November 1774

Personal details
- Born: 14 October 1712 Carlisle, Cumbria
- Died: 22 August 1793 (aged 80) Bromley, Kent
- Buried: Bletchingley, Surrey
- Denomination: Anglican
- Residence: Bromley Palace
- Parents: John Thomas & Ann Kelsick
- Spouse: Anne Clayton m. 1742; d. 1772; Elizabeth Baldwin m. 1776
- Education: The Queen's College, Oxford

John Thomas (14 October 1712 – 22 August 1793) was an English churchman, Bishop of Rochester from 1774.

== Life ==
Born in Carlisle, Cumbria, he was the eldest son of John Thomas (died 1747), vicar of Brampton, Cumberland, by his wife Ann, daughter of Richard Kelsick of Whitehaven, a captain in the merchant service. He was educated at the Carlisle grammar school, and went to The Queen's College, Oxford, matriculating on 17 December 1730. Soon after his admission he received a clerkship from the Provost Joseph Smith (1670–1756).

He became assistant master at an academy in Soho Square, and then private tutor to the younger son of Sir William Clayton, bart., whose sister he later married. On 27 March 1737, Thomas was ordained a deacon, and on 25 September received priest's orders. On 27 January 1738, he was instituted rector of Bletchingley in Surrey, a living in the gift of Sir William Clayton. He graduated B.C.L. on 6 March 1742, and D.C.L. on 25 May 1742, and on 18 January 1749, he was appointed chaplain in ordinary to HM The King (George II), a post which he retained under George III.

On 23 April 1754, he was made a prebendary of Westminster, and in 1762 he was appointed sub-almoner to the archbishop of York. On 7 January 1766, he was instituted to the vicarage of St Bride's, Fleet Street, London, and in 1768 he became Dean of Westminster and of the Order of the Bath.

On 13 November 1774, he was consecrated bishop of Rochester. He marked his episcopacy by repairing the deanery at Rochester and rebuilding the bishop's palace at Bromley, which was in a ruinous state. He died at Bromley on 22 August 1793, and was buried in the vault of the parish church of Bletchingley.

== Works ==
Thomas's ‘Sermons and Charges’ were collected and edited after his death by his nephew, George Andrew Thomas, in 1796 (London; 3rd ed. 1803). Several of his sermons were published separately in his lifetime. His portrait in the robes of the Bath, painted by Sir Joshua Reynolds, was formerly in the library of Queen's College. An engraving from it by Joseph Baker is prefixed to his ‘Sermons and Charges.’

== Family ==
He was twice married: first, in 1742, to Anne Blackwell, widow of Sir Charles Blackwell, Bt and daughter of Sir William Clayton, 1st Baronet, and Martha Kenrick. She died on 7 July 1772, and on 12 January 1776 he married Elizabeth, daughter of Charles Baldwin of Munslow in Shropshire, and widow of Sir Joseph Yates, judge of the court of king's bench. He left no children. Among other bequests he founded two scholarships at Queen's College for sons of clergymen educated at the grammar school at Carlisle, and during his lifetime he had endowed two similar scholarships at Westminster School.

Church of England titles
Preceded by Zachary Pearce	Dean of Westminster; 1768–1793	Succeeded by Samuel Horsley
Preceded by Zachary Pearce	Bishop of Rochester; 1774–1793	Succeeded by Samuel Horsley
