= Sir Lionel Copley, 2nd Baronet =

Member of Parliament for Bletchingley
- In office 1796–1797 Serving with John Stein

Member of Parliament for Tregony
- In office 1796–1802 Serving with John Nicholls

Personal details
- Born: 1767
- Died: 4 March 1806 (aged 38–39)
- Parent(s): Sir Joseph Copley, 1st Baronet

Sir Lionel Copley, 2nd Baronet (1767 – 4 March 1806) was an English politician who was High Sheriff of Cornwall. He was a member of the Copley family and served as a Member of Parliament (MP).

== Sources ==
- Hughes, A. (1898). List of Sheriffs for England and Wales from the Earliest Times to A.D. 1831. London: Eyre & Spottiswoode. (with amendments of 1963, Public Record Office)

== See also ==
- List of MPs elected in the 1796 British general election
- List of MPs in the first United Kingdom Parliament
