= Sir William Clayton, 4th Baronet =

English politician

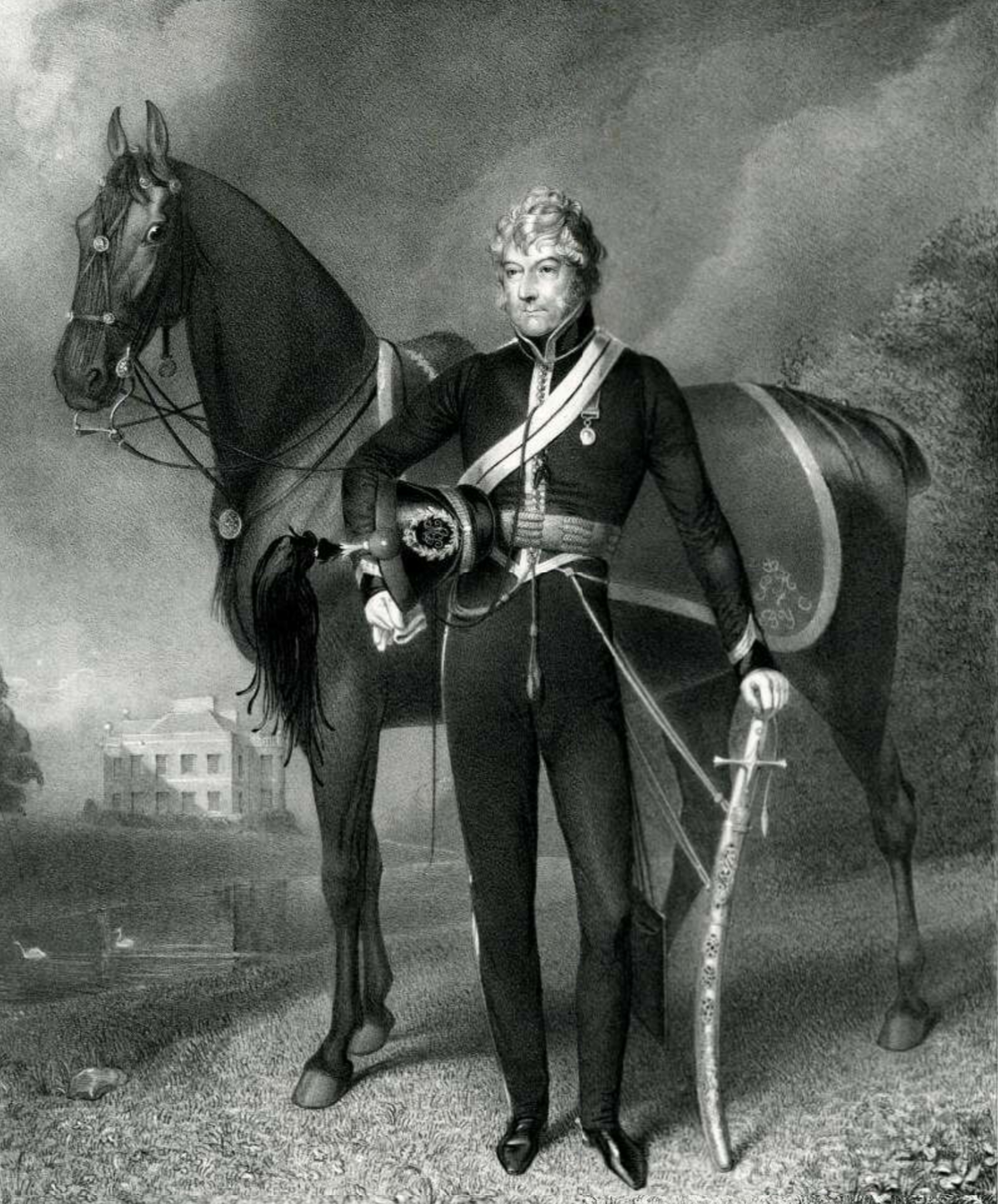
Sir William Clayton at Harleyford circa 1800

Sir William Clayton, 4th Baronet (16 April 1762 – 26 January 1834) of Harleyford Manor, near Great Marlow, Buckinghamshire was an English politician.

Clayton was the oldest surviving son of William Clayton (c. 1718 – 1783), of Harleyford Manor, who was the grand-nephew of Sir Robert Clayton, a wealthy banker and former Lord Mayor of London.

He was educated at Queen's College, Oxford.

In 1783, he was elected unopposed was a Member of Parliament (MP) for the rotten borough of Great Marlow, succeeding his father. He held the seat until he stood down at the general election in 1790.

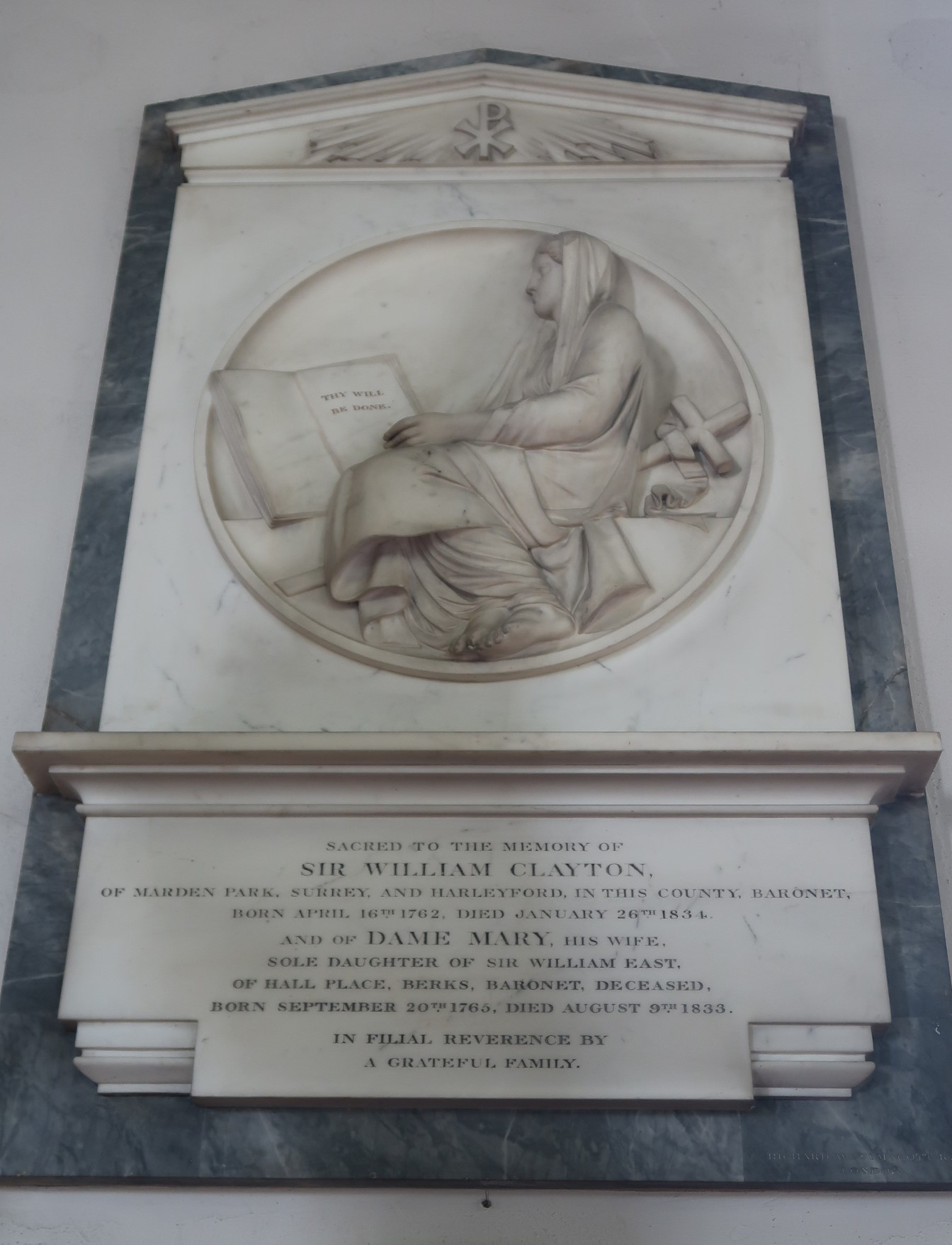
Wall memorial in All Saints Church, Marlow

In 1799 he inherited the baronetcy of his first cousin Sir Robert Clayton and Marden Park, which was rented among people to Joseph Buonaparte. He died aged 71 on 26 January 1834, and was succeeded in the baronetcy by his eldest son, William Robert, who became an MP for Great Marlow from 1832 to 1842.

== Family ==
In 1785, he married Mary East, the daughter of Sir William East, 1st Baronet, a former High Sheriff of Berkshire. They had 5 sons and 2 daughters:

- Catherine Emilia (d. 7 Feb 1864) married John Shawe Manley but died without issue.
- Gen. Sir William Robert (28 Aug 1786-19 Sep 1866)
- Sir East George Clayton East, 1st Baronet (9 Apr 1794-6 Mar 1851), who married Marianne Frances Bishop. They had eight children.
- Lt. John Lloyd (19 Aug 1796-6 Oct 1855), who married Louisa Sophia Littledale on 10 April 1832. They had one son John, who married firstly Mary Somerset (granddaughter of Rev. Lord William George Somerset, and Sir Maurice Charles Philip O'Connell) and secondly Catherine Gibson.
- Rice Richard (15 Nov 1797-4 May 1879)
- Rev. August Philip (11 Oct 1799-2 Feb 1871) married Georgiana Elizabeth Talbot, daughter of Very Rev. Charles Talbot and Lady Catherine Somerset. They had a daughter, and son, Sir Fitzroy, who was married to Lady Isabel Frances Taylour, daughter of the 3rd Marquess of Headfort.
- Mary Caroline (June 1800-29 Oct 1812)

Parliament of Great Britain
Preceded by Sir John Borlase Warren, Bt; William Clayton	Member of Parliament for Great Marlow; 1783–1790; With: Sir John Borlase Warren, Bt to 1784; Sir Thomas Rich, Bt 1784–1790	Succeeded by William Lee-Antonie; Thomas Williams
Baronetage of Great Britain
Preceded by Robert Clayton	Baronet (of Marden Park); 1799–1834	Succeeded by William Robert Clayton
