= Clayton baronets =

There have been three baronetcies created for persons named Clayton, two in the Baronetage of Great Britain and one in the Baronetage of the United Kingdom. One creation is extant as of 2026.

- Clayton baronets of Marden Park (1732), later Clayton-East baronets and Clayton-East-Clayton baronets
- Clayton baronets of Adlington (1774)
- Clayton-East baronets of Hall Place (1838), later Gilbert-East baronets and Clayton-East-Clayton baronets
