= The Manor House, Sedgefield =

18th-century house in Co.Durham

Coordinates: 54°39′11″N 1°27′07″W

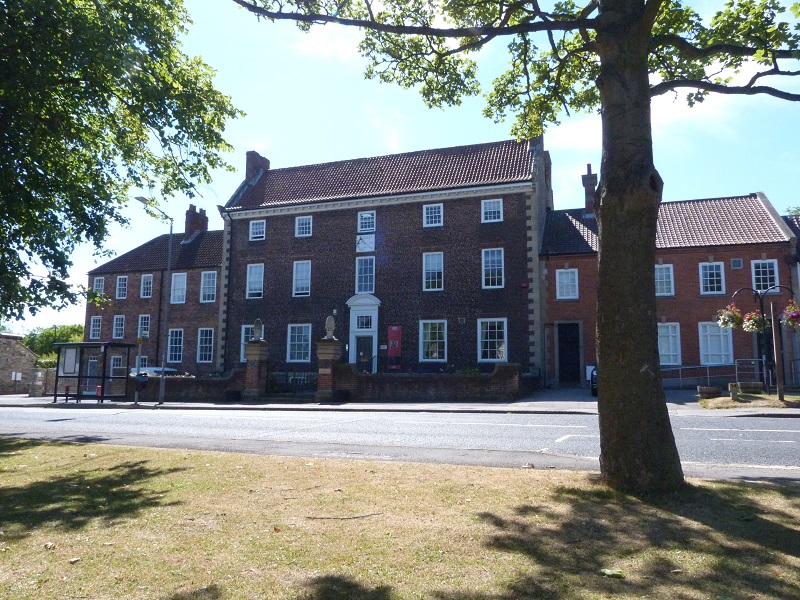

The Manor House in Sedgefield, County Durham was built in 1707 on high ground in a country setting looking on to St. Edmund's Church, as a mansion house for wealthy judge Robert Wright. Its notoriety arises from the eminence of the judge of Middle Temple who went on to be Chief Justice of colonial South Carolina, and also because it is a rare example of Queen Anne style architecture in an area as far north as Sedgefield, with fine and distinctive architectural features including, reportedly, a wood carving by Grinling Gibbons. In 1756 the house was acquired by John Burdon of nearby Hardwick Estate who installed a noteworthy Palladian Venetian window very likely by the architect James Paine. In the twentieth century the Manor House was the head offices of Sedgefield Rural District Council and after that Sedgefield Magistrates' Court.

== Background ==
The Manor House which is a Grade II* listed building was never in fact a house for the lord of the manor but was built as a mansion house. The change in description appears to have occurred in the early 20th century when the house became a head office for the local authority, Sedgefield Rural District Council.

The origins of the Manor House arguably begin with The Rising of the North in 1569 when Anthony Hebborn of nearby Hardwick Estate joined the northern Earls in the unsuccessful rebellion against Queen Elizabeth I. When the rebellion was suppressed, Anthony Hebborne among with many others was included in the bill of attainder which resulted in his execution at York and his family being stripped of his estate. The Hardwick Estate was given to George Freville (later knighted) (d. 1619) who had been clerk of the ordnance under the Earl of Sussex, who was responsible for quelling the rebellion. Sir George Freville's heir was his nephew Nicholas Freville (later knighted) (1598-1674). As a landowner Sir Nicholas benefited from the Sedgefield 1636 enclosure award by being allocated waste land by the Bishopric of Durham including west-field, the land on which the Manor House was to be built. Sir Nicholas gave land including west-field to Sir Thomas Lambton (1628-1662) when he married his daughter Margaret Freville in December 1660. They had a son, Freville Lambton (1661-1731) who inherited his father’s land and was also the heir of his grandfather Sir Nicholas Freville. In 1695 Freville Lambton married Anne Wright (d. 1731 at Hardwick) (his third wife), daughter of Sir Robert Wright, Chief Justice of the King’s Bench. Her father had died in Newgate Prison in London in 1689, charged with treason by William of Orange following the Glorious Revolution, and Anne had come to Sedgefield with her brother Robert Wright, also a judge who had taken the role of Justice of the Common Pleas in the County Palatine of Durham in the same year.

Robert Wright was of the Wright family of Kilverstone in Norfolk which is a traditional rural hunting area similar to Sedgefield, which would have suited him as a place in which to exile himself from London following his father’s demise. In the year that his father died and Robert became Judge of the Common Pleas he married Alicea Pitt (née Johnson) (1643-1723) widow of Baldwin Pitt in St Edmund's Church, Sedgefield. Alicea was the daughter and heir of gentleman of Sedgefield John Johnson, who was a land owner and had benefited from the allocation of land resulting from the Sedgefield enclosure award of 1636, and therefore Robert would have acquired land as a result of his marriage. Alicea at 46 was twice as old as Robert who was 23 when they married. The octagonal font in St Edmund's Church commemorates the marriage with a coat of arms of Wright impaling Johnson. The marriage of Freville Lambton to Anne Wright is commemorated on another face of the font in the same way. We can assume that after his arrival in Sedgefield Anne would have lived with Robert until her marriage in 1695 and also their other sisters Susan Radford (née Wright) (d. 1730 at Hardwick) following the death of her husband Virtue Radford in 1694, Elizabeth (d. 1753, London) until her marriage to John Rugge in 1692 and Alice (1672-1724) until her marriage to John Ball in 1706, however where they lived prior to the building of the Manor House is not known. Robert had his own house built, what is now the Manor House, and completed in 1707 as evidenced on the notable sun dial on the front elevation of the house.

As a wealthy member of London society Robert had many influences, and it appears he brought these north to incorporate into his house which was built as a Queen Anne style mansion house.

== Location ==
Though diagrams of the allocation of land resulting from the Sedgefield enclosure agreement of 1636 exist with the Bishopric of Durham, it is probably impossible to know what buildings other than St Edmund's Church were in existence in what is now the centre of Sedgefield in the 17th century before Robert Wright built his mansion house. What there was would likely have been feudal cottages known as messuages and similar dwellings. St. Edmund's Church stands prominently on high ground where it has been since the 13th century. Before that there would have been a wooden Anglo-Saxon church. The high ground extends west for a short distance until falling away towards the Hardwick Estate. With land acquired from his links to the Hardwick Estate and connections to the church, Robert Wright chose to build his country mansion at the point just before the land falls away, and thus position it facing St Edmund's Church as almost a counterpoint in the scene. To the west, from the rear of the building it would look down to the Hardwick Estate with a clear view to the estate and beyond.

As a result of the Sedgefield enclosure agreement of 1636, building took place around St Edmund's and the Manor House in the 18th century, forming much of the village centre around the village green that can be seen today. The first of these was Coopers Almshouses which were built adjoining the church in 1705 (demolished in the 1960s), just before the completion of the Manor House and funded by the surgeon and benefactor Thomas Cooper. Buildings were also built adjoining the Manor House to form West End and on Cross Hill, which obscured the view of the church from the Manor House.

== Architecture ==
As a result of his London influences Robert Wright brought with him to his mansion house many architectural features that were probably not seen before in the area. He was related to Sir Christopher Wren through his mother Susan (née Wren) whose father was Matthew Wren, Bishop of Ely who was the uncle of Sir Christopher Wren, and thereby Susan and Sir Christopher Wren were cousins. There is no suggestion that Sir Christopher Wren was responsible for the Manor House, however his influence is apparent. Wood panelling and the fireplace in the cellar kitchen are similar to those seen in Sir Christopher Wren's extension to Hampton Court Palace completed for Queen Anne. There was reputed to be a fine wood carving by Dutch carver Grinling Gibbons above a fireplace, described by Nikolaus Pevsner as a Carolean-style carved overmantel; wood carvings by Grinling Gibbons are numerous in Hampton Court Palace. The carving was lost in a fire in the north block of the Manor House in November 1947.

"The manor-house, a large well-designed three-storey brick building on the west side of the market-place, now used as District Council offices, has a mural sundial dated 1707. Over the mantelpiece in the boardroom is a carving attributed to Grinling Gibbons."

The Manor House is built in the classic style of Queen Anne architecture, with the key features of bi-lateral symmetry, rows of painted sash windows, stone quoins emphasizing the corners and box-like double-pile plans two rooms deep.

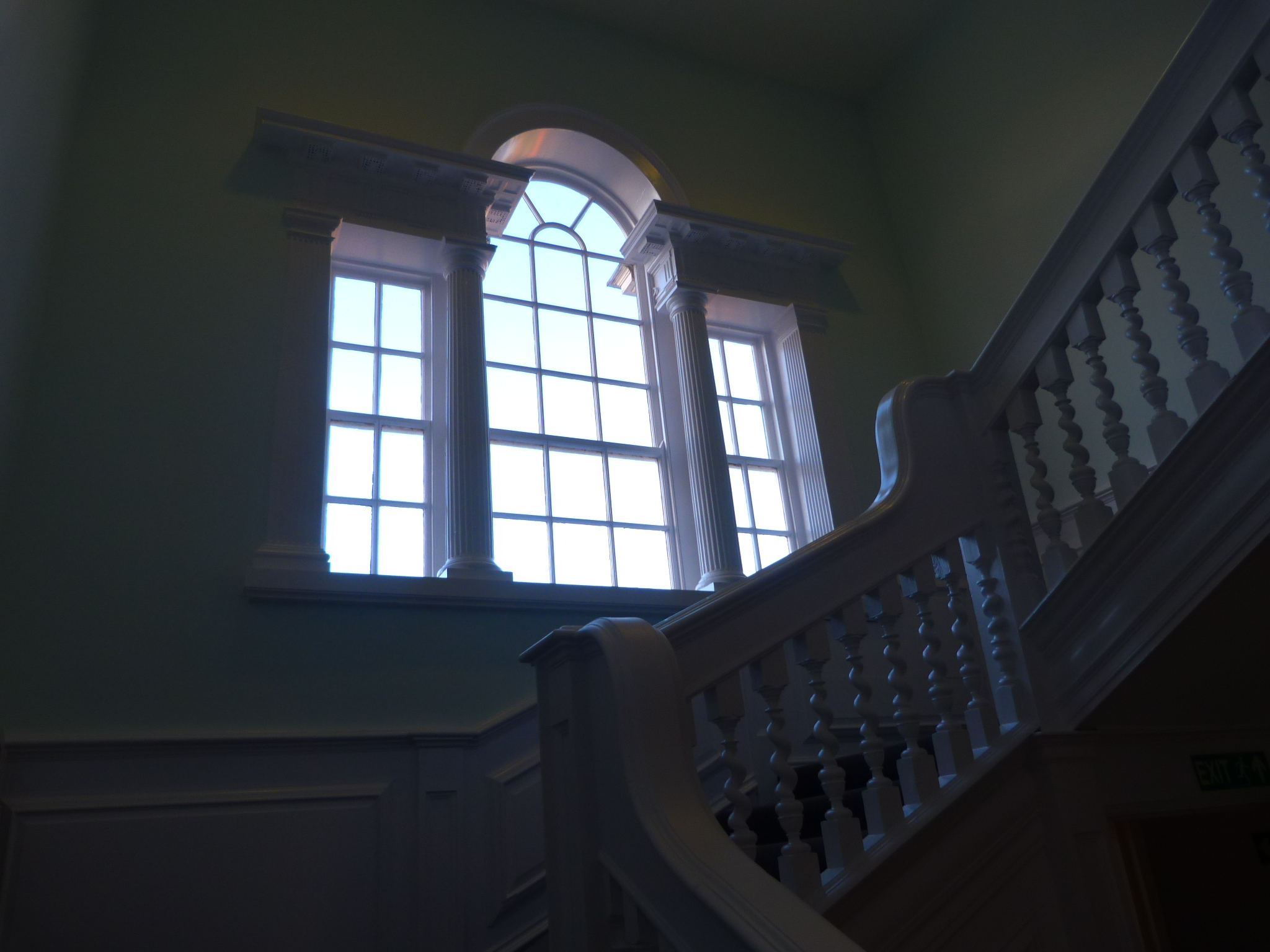
The Palladian window in the Manor House, Sedgefield. Possibly installed by James Paine.

In some ways the Manor House is a contrast of crude and fine. It is faced front and rear with red brick which was unusual in the north at the time, and used in the new architecture of London that followed the Great Fire of 1666 (for example Newcastle House in Lincoln's Inn Fields), however the bricks of the Manor House though described by Nikolaus Pevsner as “consciously fashionable’, on close inspection are crude and often show dark patches from their firing. The gable ends are of crude local sandstone. The house has many of the features of a Queen Anne Style mansion house but not all, for example it does not have a full central triangular pediment. The materials and architecture probably reflect what was available in the area at the time.

Other notable features of the original design include the central staircase with rising handrails, a rare dog gate at the top of the first flight of the mains staircase, the Modillion cornice, and an unusual sundial above the front door with the date 1707. The gate piers on the wall of the front court have large stone-carved pineapples which were ostentatiously fashionable at the time. In the cellars is an old window to what was probably the cook's room off the central passageway and which was said by Martin Roberts of Pevsner Guides on a visit in 2016 to likely be of about 1650, and therefore to pre-date the house and to have been reused from an older cottage. The vaulted wine cellars were converted in around 1974 into holding cells and a custody police office for the magistrates’ court, and a barred security gate was installed in the central corridor, and these features are still intact

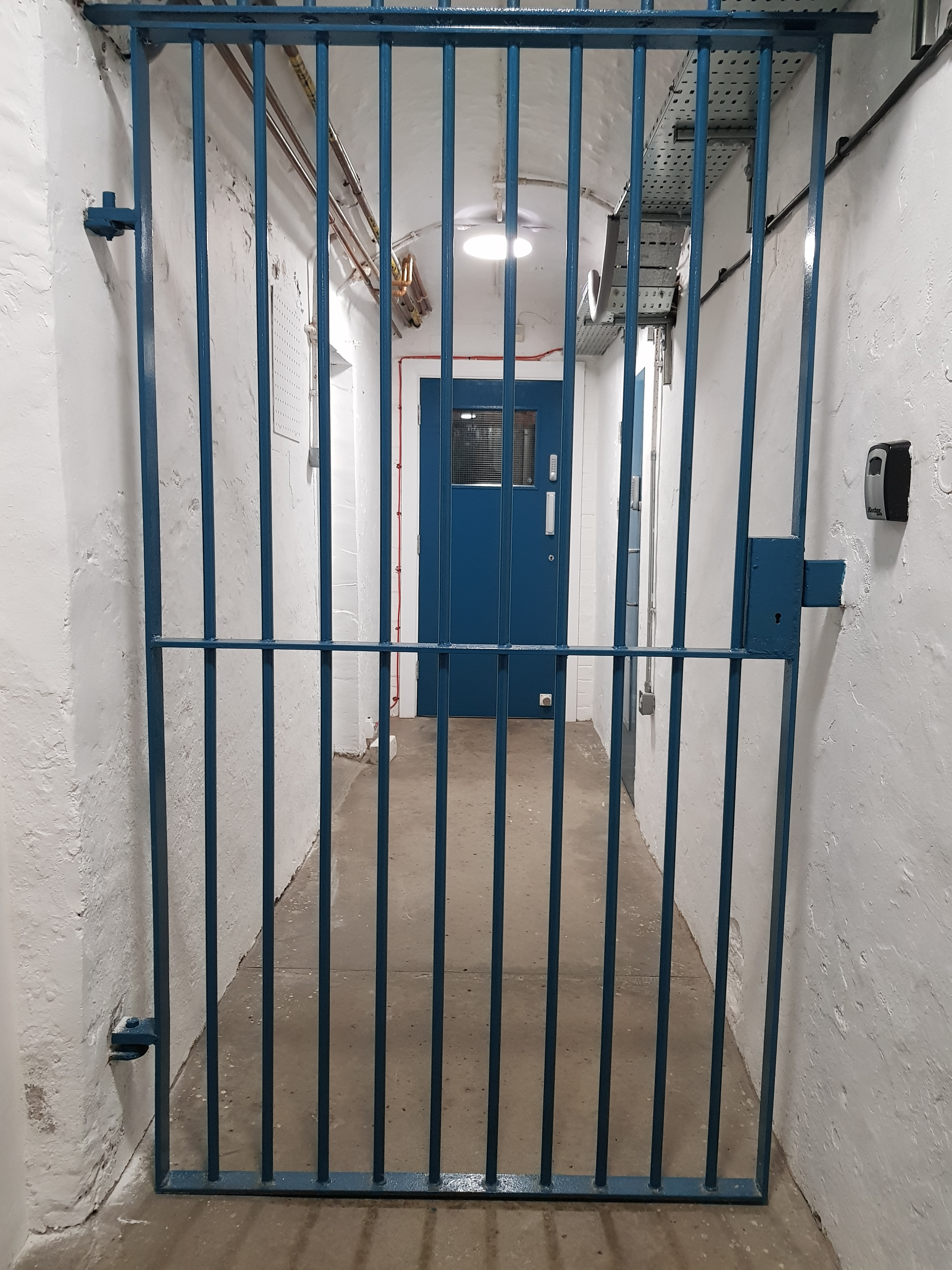
The magistrates’ court cells area in the cellars of Manor House, Sedgefield

.

Above the main staircase and in the rear wall of the house is an imposing Palladian-style Venetian window which was fitted sometime after the building of the house. It is of the style of the renowned architect James Paine and therefore there is a possibility that it could have been installed in around 1756 when James Paine or his practice was commissioned by John Burdon who owned Hardwick Estate at the time to create follies and buildings in the pleasure grounds of his estate. John Burdon had purchased Robert Wright's mansion house following years of title dispute which was settled in the High Court of Chancery in 1756. An almost identical window is in the dining room of nearby Hatfield College in Durham.

The Manor House originally had large gardens to the rear which we must assume were laid out to the style of the day. Though there is no evidence it is known that there was a coach house to the rear. The Newcastle Courant on 30 July 1757 printed an advert for the sale of the Manor House described as a mansion house "well finished with garden, coach house, stables and other offices".

== The mansion house of Robert Wright 1707-1725 ==
The sundial above the front door of the Manor House includes the year 1707 which is therefore assumed to be the year in which the Manor House was built, or more likely, completed. The dates of births, deaths and marriages of Robert Wright and his family support this date as do architectural features such as the rising handrails of the main staircase, a style which was in use for a limited time around the first half of the 18th century. The Manor House was built as a mansion house for Robert Wright. His sisters who accompanied him north to Sedgefield were either married or widowed by the time the Manor House was built (1). Robert Wright likely enjoyed hunting and entertaining, and the size and grandeur of his house reflected both. The dog gate at the top of the first flight of the main staircase would have kept hunting dogs from the upper floors, and the kitchens in the cellars are large enough to entertain. Robert Wright's time at his mansion house was limited and after the Jacobite Rebellion and the Hanoverian Succession in 1715 he is likely to have spent more time in London, where he had seven children with his mistress Isabella Bulman, whom he married in December 1724 before he left for the colony of Carolina to become Chief Justice from May 1725. Robert's wife Alicea had died in Sedgefield in November 1724.

== The Manor House after 1725 ==
Following Alicea's death and Robert's departure there were four claimants to the copyhold title of the Manor House. John Ball was husband of Robert’s sister Alice (d. 1724) and they were probably living in Sedgefield and possibly in the Manor House. Alice died in 1724 and John Ball may have continued living there until his death in 1732. Robert Wright made a title surrender which was probably the Manor House to John Ball for a payment of £1600 plus interest on 10 October 1717. George Wheler was the son of Sir George Wheler who was a canon of Durham Cathedral and rector of a school in Houghton le Spring. On 12 May 1719 Robert Wright surrendered a title in Sedgefield to Sir George Wheler for a sum of £750 plus interest. As the consideration for both of the surrenders to John Ball and Sir George Wheler included payment of interest, it implies that the actual surrenders were expected to be at some point in the future, which seems to indicate that Robert Wright was making his future plans. Charles Monson MP was deputy Paymaster General and brother of Lord Monson, Commissioner for Trade and Plantations including those in Carolina, and it is likely both were involved in arranging for Robert Wright to acquire a plantation when he arrived in Carolina in 1725. Fourthly, John Cotton who was Lord Proprietor of Carolina and was likely involved in Robert Wright's appointment as Chief Justice of the colony. The dispute concerning the ownership of the title of Robert Wright’s mansion house was not resolved until 1756 in the Court of Chancery in London, when the titles held by Robert Wright were sold and the title of the Manor House was bought by John Burdon of the Hardwick Estate.

After his purchase of the Manor House in 1756 John Burdon's sister Isobel and her husband James Muncaster became residents from 11 October 1757. The records are confusing but it appears that John Burdon retained the title until 11 May 1791 when, due to financial difficulties, he sold the Hardwick Estate and probably the Manor House also to William Russell of Brancepeth Castle in County Durham.

After this a number of individuals are mentioned in the Halmote Court records in Durham as being involved in the title to the Manor House, these include(2);

- Robert Roper of the Roper family of Trimdon estates, which had valuable mineral deposits.
- Roper Stote Donnison Roper, a lawyer of Lincoln's Inn and legal writer of Gray's Inn, who took the title on 14 June 1815 from Robert Roper.
- George Anthony Lambert, a lawyer of Lincoln's Inn who had a solicitors’ practice at 19 Dean Street, Newcastle upon Tyne and Thomas Wrightson Junior of Thirsk, who took the title together on 18 December 1817.
- John Barugh of Runswick in the parish of Fingale in the county of York who took the title on 16 May 1834. John Barugh's sons Thomas Barugh of Runswick and William Barugh of Ripon inherited the title.
- Joseph Johnson (d 6 May 1884) a Durham builder of Hetton-le-Hole, took the title from Thomas Barugh on 16 May 1860 and his wife Jane inherited the title from him.
- Lucretia Lockwood Kane became a tenant of Jane Johnson sometime in the 1880s or 1890s, and Thomas Adam Beresford Kane a doctor of Byers Green and John Reay manager of the gas works in Norton became tenants on 23 April 1897. On 9 December 1897 Mitcheson Reay, a timber merchant from Norton and Henry Harcus a merchant of 48 Osborne Road, Newcastle upon Tyne took the title from Jane Johnson.
- William Snowdon and his wife Alice bought the title from Thomas Beresford Kane and John Reay for £800 on 13 May 1901 and became the last domestic occupiers of the house. William died in 1904 and Alice died in 1907.

The property laws of England were undergoing changes in the later half of the 19th and early years of the 20th century, and it is likely that the status of copyhold was no longer sustainable for the Manor House. Thus it seems convenient that the building was taken as the council offices for Sedgefield Rural District Council from 1907 while the Poor Union of Sedgefield took the title and thereby benefited from the rent paid by the council. This carried on until copyhold was abolished in 1927 and Sedgefield Rural District Council took the freehold by conveyance. The Manor House continued to be used as the head office of Sedgefield Rural District Council until local government reorganisation in 1974, after which it became Sedgefield Magistrates' Court until 1990. One notable event during council ownership was the fire which destroyed the council chamber and much of the north block of the building including the renowned wood carving attributed to Grinling Gibbons in November 1947. In 1936 an 18th-century cottage which adjoined the south gable of the Manor House and which was in poor condition was demolished, and in 1937 a three-storey building which formed additional adjoining offices accessed from inside the Manor House, and a separate council caretaker’s cottage was built in its place. In 1990 the building was sold to private owners and then renovated and has been used as offices since. From 2015 it has also been used for weddings and events.

== Notes ==
1. Susan (d. 1730 at Hardwick) married Virtue Radford (d. 1694) in 1687 and probably moved into Hardwick with Anne after her marriage. Anne (d. 1731 at Hardwick Hall) had married Freville Lambton (1661-1732). Elizabeth (d. 1753) had married John Rugge in 1692. Alice (1672 - 1724) married John Ball (d. 1732) in 1706.
2. The details of title holders and tenants were researched at the Halmote Court office in Durham by Sue Turnbull of Sedgefield.
