= Robert Wright (South Carolina judge) =

English judge and jurist (1666–1739)

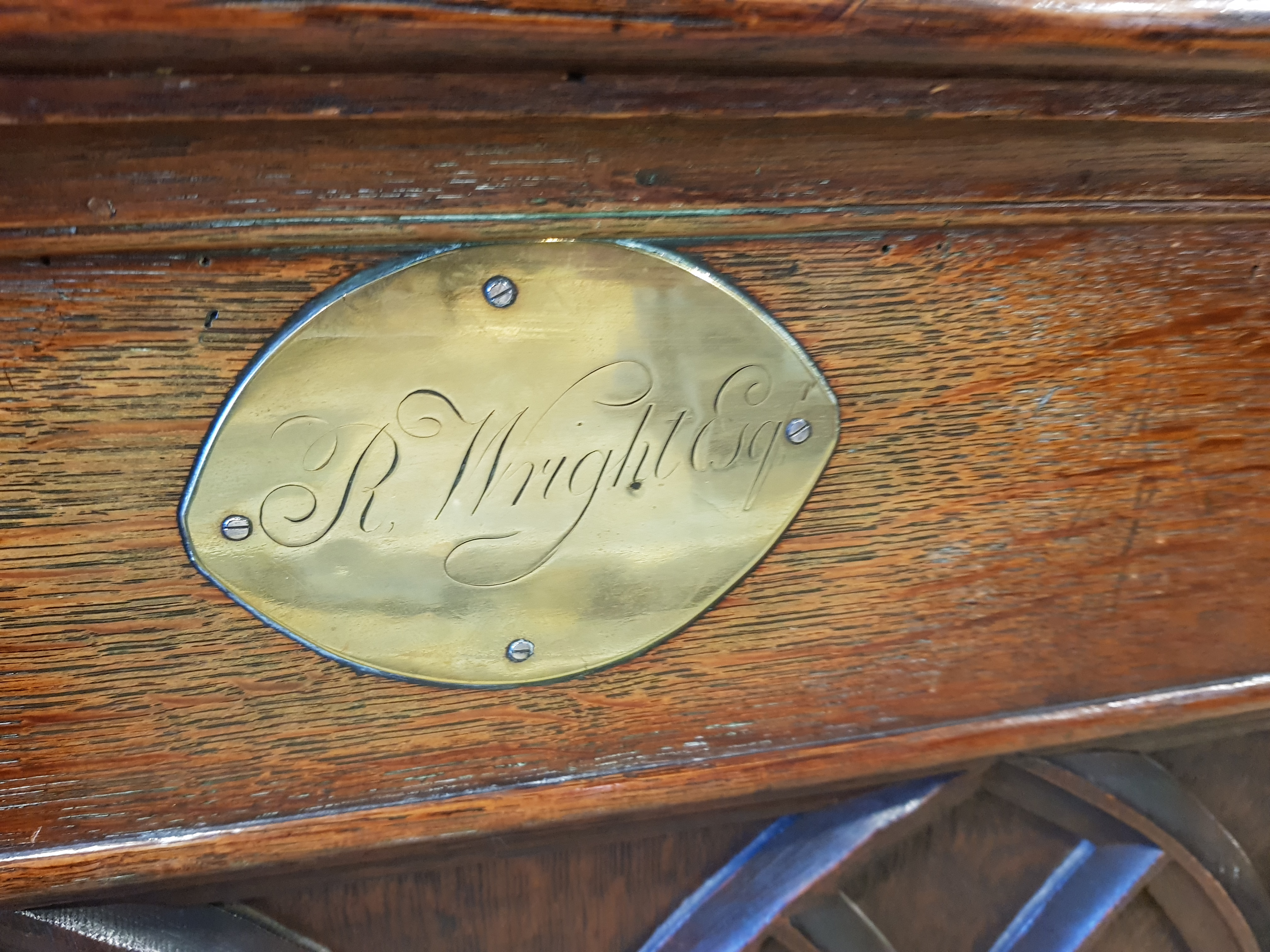
The name of Robert Wright Esq. on his private family pew in St. Edmund's Church, Sedgefield

Robert Wright (1666 – 12 October 1739) was an English judge and jurist. He was the son of Sir Robert Wright, Chief Justice of the King's Bench (1687–1689) who died in Newgate Prison following the Glorious Revolution. In the same year Robert was called to the bar at Middle Temple and became a judge. Robert took the role of Judge of the Common Pleas in the North East of England and married widowed land-heiress Alicea Pitt (née Johnson) (d.1723), daughter of John Johnson of Sedgefield and settled in Sedgefield before returning to London following the Hanoverian succession in 1715.

Meanwhile, he fathered seven children with his mistress Isabella (1675 – 21 November 1752) in Bloomsbury, before sailing for colonial Charles Town to become Chief Justice of the colony of Carolina, and subsequently South Carolina, and a plantation owner. He died there in 1739. His son Sir James Wright went on to become a colonial governor of Georgia.

== Biography ==
Born into the wealthy Wright family of Kilverstone in Norfolk Robert graduated from Caius College Cambridge and became a judge after being called to the bar at Middle Temple. He was appointed Judge of the Common Pleas of the County Palatine of Durham in the North East of England and married the widow Alicea Pitt (née Johnson) (d.1723) (note that some records such as the marriage records in County Durham archives give the spelling as ‘Alicea and some, such as the tomb of Baldwin Pitt give it as Alicia there in 1689 and as his wife was the heir of her father John Johnson's land he is likely to have gained the titles to the land involved. It seems he gained titles to further land and property when his sister Anne Wright (d.1731) married local landowner Freville Lambton (1661–1731). Robert built a mansion house in Sedgefield in 1707 (now The Manor House in Sedgefield) on the land he had gained from Anne's marriage. Meanwhile, Robert took a mistress in Bloomsbury, Isabella (1675–1752) with whom he had seven children between 1703 and 1716, the first when he was 37 and Isabella was 28. As a member of the land-owning aristocracy and likely to have influential friends in London's Hanoverian political and social society of the time Robert is likely to have been a Whig and following the Hanoverian succession his interests lay more in the capital than in Sedgefield. His wife Alicea died in November 1723 and was buried on 27 November 1723 in St. Edmunds Church, Sedgefield. After her death and the death of his sister Alice the same month the following year – Alice and her husband had probably had their home with Robert and his wife – Robert wasted little time in arranging a move to the colony of Carolina with Isabella and their children where fortunes were to be made and he became Chief Justice of the colony and a plantation owner. His little sister Alice died on 17 November and was buried at Sedgefield on 19 November 1724. He took the position of Chief Justice of Carolina on 27 May 1725 though his appointment was not officially confirmed until 30 November 1730 as Chief Justice of South Carolina by King George II.

In 1733 he was in dispute with the colonial South Carolina Assembly, which objected to his involvement in releasing Surveyor-General James St. John (he had been arrested for opposing the Assembly in its distribution of land which favored Assembly members over commoners). This resulted in the withholding of Wright's chief justice salary for five years because, it was said, he "hath lately invaded and violated the known privileges of this house". He constantly pursued the outstanding sum up to his death in 1739 and then the cause was taken up by his wife Isabella and son James with limited success, securing £1,000 from £5,000 owed.

Wright died of a fever aged 73, probably in Charles Town (Charleston) in 1739. When he was ill and dying his friend James Oglethorpe wrote to Wright's friend the 1st Duke of Newcastle to advise him. “The Chief Justice of South Carolina is a very worthy gentleman, I hope he may long continue but as all men are mortal and he is sick of an illness which hath been fatal in Carolina his fate seems clear”.

Lieutenant Governor Bull of Carolina wrote to advise the Commissioners for Trade and Plantations of his death. “this province has been lately visited with an epidemical fever which raged chiefly in Charleston and carried off great numbers of people, amongst whom died Mr. Justice Wright.” There was an auction of some of Robert Wright's possessions in 1742 following an advertisement “at the plantation late of Robert Wright esq. deceased, near Dorchester, a parcel of very good slaves and sundry other things”.

The seven children of Robert Wright went on to marry and prosper including Sir James Wright as colonial Governor of Georgia who returned to London after the American War of Independence, died in 1785 and is buried in the north transept of Westminster Abbey. Their mother, Robert's second wife Isabella, died in 1752.

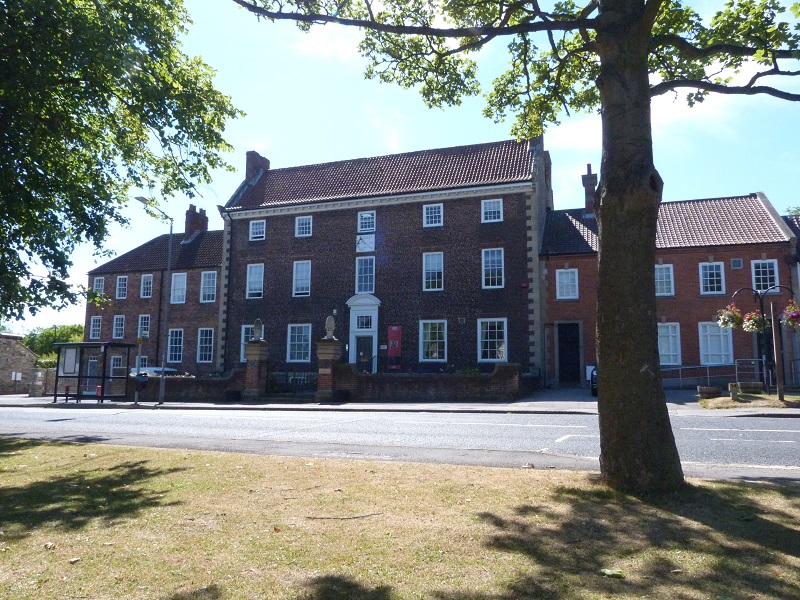
The Manor House, Sedgefield which was built as a Queen Anne style mansion house for Robert Wright Esq.

== Background ==
Born in 1666 The son of Sir Robert Wright, Chief Justice of the King's Bench (1687–1689) and Baronet of Kilverstone Hall, Kilverstone in Norfolk. Robert followed his father, to Eton, Caius College Cambridge and then to Middle Temple where he was called to the bar in 1687. Unfortunately for Robert, his father died not long after in Newgate Prison where he had been sent charged with treason by William of Orange following the Glorious Revolution, his father having served King James II. Sir Robert was considered and inept and corrupt judge and his performance when presiding at the notorious Trial of the Seven Bishops was generally criticised. For a son of the same name and also a judge, London was not a safe place to remain. Robert was appointed Judge of the Common Pleas in the County Palatine of Durham in the North East of England, as far from the capital as he could go at the time, where he married the widow Alicea Pitt (née Johnson) (d.1723) in 1689 and thereby likely came to own land titles in the area as Alicea was the heir to her father John Johnson, a gentleman of Sedgefield and a local land owner. Robert is likely to have added further to his land titles when his sister Anne Wright married local landowner Freville Lambton of Hardwick Estate in 1695; this will have included the land on which Robert was to build his mansion house in Sedgefield (now the Sedgefield Manor House).

It is not known how Robert's appointment in the North East and his marriage to Alicea, both in the year he was called to the bar and his father died, were arranged. In 1660 Thomas Lambton (1628–1662), a year before his death, married Margaret Freville, daughter of Nicholas Freville who owned Hardwick Estate near Sedgefield and benefitted from a dowry of land which on his death passed back to Nicholas Freville but who bequeathed it to his grandson Freville Lambton, son of Thomas and Margaret. Freville subsequently married Anne Wright in 1695 who as his sister would have been a dependent of Robert and it is very likely Robert benefitted from a similar land transaction that Thomas had.

Following Robert's marriage to Alicea in 1689 Robert built a mansion house in Sedgefield opposite St. Edmunds Church. The house was built in the style of a Queen Anne mansion house, probably influenced by the designs of Sir Christopher Wren to whom Robert was related through his mother Susan Wright (b. St. Giles in the Fields, London, 25 January 1633 – d.bef.1681, née Wren). Like Kilverstone, Sedgefield was (and still is) a traditional hunting area which would have suited Robert. At the time of their marriage Robert was 23. There are no baptisms from June 1646 to October 1653 at Sedgefield St. Edmund the Bishop in Stockton district. As Alicia's baptism cannot otherwise be found, it is likely she was born some time in this period and was between 43 and 36 years old at the time of the marriage. Alicia's first husband Baldwin Pitt had been born in 1646, and that would make them about the same age.

The octagonal font in St. Edmunds Church bears eight coats of arms carved on the instructions of Rector Theophilus Pickering in 1711, one on each face, marking a notable union and there is a one for Lambton impaling Wright (the marriage of Freville Lambton and Anne Wright) and one for Wright impaling Johnson (the marriage of Robert Wright and Alicea Pitt (née Johnson)) probably indicating the beneficence of the families to the church. Robert also had a private pew which would have been in exchange for a financial contribution to the church and which is still present near the pulpit.

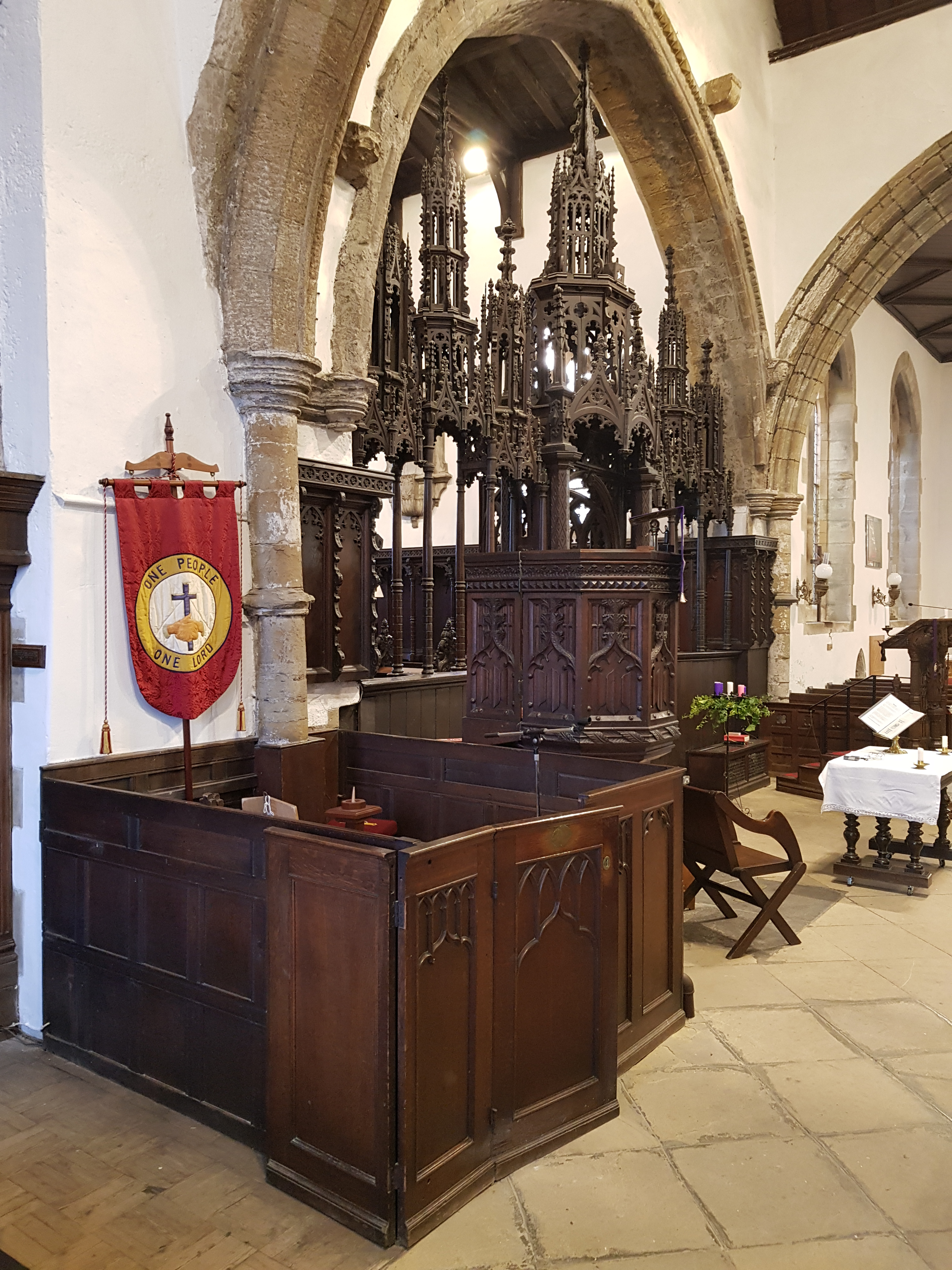
Robert Wright's family pew in St. Edmund's, Sedgefield

It is evident that Robert retained ties to London as he had his first child there named Isabella after her mother Isabella in 1703 when Robert was 37 and Isabella 28. Robert's dateable and provable appearance in London society coincides with the ascension of Queen Anne to the throne in 1702. He went on to father six more children with Isabella between 1703 and 1716. His fourth son was James who subsequently became Sir James Wright, colonial Governor of Georgia before the American War of Independence. In 1715 Queen Anne was succeeded by the Hanoverian King George I and, a Jacobite Rebellion was suppressed and London once again became a safe place for Robert. There is evidence that he began to surrender his titles to land and property in Sedgefield which may be an indication he had little further to do with the area.

Alicia died in November 1723 and was buried in St. Edmunds Church on 27 November. In My Zeal for the Real Happiness of Both Great Britain and the Colonies: The Conflicting Imperial Career of Sir James Wright Robert G. Brooking states that one week later in December Robert married Isabella Bulman at St. Giles in the Fields, London. It was known as a ‘marriage mill’, a convenient church for a speedily arranged marriage.

Robert made the voyage to Charles Town (Charleston) with Isabella and their seven children having 'laitly arrived' in January 1726. An eye-witness account of their arrival exists by resident Elizabeth Hyrne writing to her brother Burrell Massingberd in Lincolnshire. Elizabeth writes in her letter which she dates 21 January 1725:

"Here is laitly arrived in this province one Mr Robert Wright a gentleman of large family of both sons and daughters they appear to be very genteel people and to have a good substance it is said they have now 4 or 500 pounds (Note: 4 or 500 pounds may have been the price Robert received for his mansion house in Sedgefield.) in England at a place called Sagefeild near Newcastle that he has been a member of the English Parliament, (Note: ‘he has been a member of the English Parliament’: Robert Wright was not an MP so this may be confusion with his father who was) he has brought over a coach and several servants in livery, what was his reason for leaving England I cannot tell some say his father was a judge in King James's reign and that being a non-juror (Note: Non-jurors were high church - Church of England who did not support the Protestant William of Orange as King. People in such circumstances were often penalised by being required to pay additional taxes.) was weary of heavy taxes but I believe they indever to keep it privett (Note: ‘indever to keep it privett’: it seems Elizabeth Hyrne has noticed that Robert Wright has something that he requires to keep to himself which may have been that his father was Sir Robert Wright or it may be his family circumstances of seven children to a wife he had only recently married.) be it so or not however he is likely to make a good settler he has bought a large plantation with some buildings upon it upon Ashley River and has paid a great deal of money for it if you know of anything of him".

There are other references to Robert Wright and his son Sir James Wright in colonial America that make reference to ‘Isabella Pitts’ or Robert being married to ‘the widow Pitts’. This is a confusion of both wives Alicea Pitt and Isabella and it may be that Robert was keen to foster the confusion so that his duplicitous past would not be known in the place where he had at last established a new life away from both the stigma of his father and the double life he led with two women between Sedgefield and Bloomsbury.

Before or on arrival in Carolina Robert became Chief Justice on 27 May 1725 though his position as Chief Justice of South Carolina (the colony having divided into North Carolina and South Carolina in 1729) wasn't officially confirmed as Chief Justice of South Carolina by King George II until 30 November 1730.

Robert Wright was also a plantation owner and therefore a slave owner. Elizabeth Hyrne reported that he had bought a plantation on the Ashley River in 1725 and by 1730 he was the partial owner of a 12,000-acre barony purchased jointly with George Anson also in the area of the Ashley River which was divided up into tracts and sold. In 1735 Robert added a further 2000 acres to his estate when he purchased an area which became known as Cove Hall or Wrights Bluff on the Santee River.

Robert Wright died from yellow fever in 1739 aged 73 years. His will is not known to exist and following his death his land and property was distributed to his family and what remained, including ‘a very good parcel of slaves’ was sold by auction at his estate near Dorchester in 1742. His wife Isabella and his son Sir James Wright pursued his claim for outstanding pay with the South Carolina Assembly and eventually obtained £1000 of the £5000 owed.

== Family ==
Coat of Arms of Robert Wright

=== Parents ===
- Father: Sir Robert Wright, Knight, of Wrangford (c.1634–1689)
- Mother: Susan Wren (born St. Giles in the Fields, London, 25 January 1633 – d.bef.1681), daughter of Matthew Wren, Bishop of Ely

=== Siblings ===
- Susan Wright, sister (d.1730 at Hardwick, Sedgefield) m. Virtue Radford (d.1694) 1687 in Westminster Abbey
- Anne Wright, sister (d.1731 at Hardwick, Sedgefield) m. Freville Lambton (1661–1732) 1695
- Elizabeth Wright, sister (d.1753, buried in London) m. John Rugge 1692
- Alice Wright, sister (1672–1724) m. John Ball (d.1732/3) 1706 in St. Stephen Walbrook, London, both buried in the altar tomb of St. Edmunds, Sedgefield
- William Wright, half-brother (b. by 1683), in Ireland in 1713. Possibly the Colonel William Wright who lived in Bushy Park prior to his moving to Clontarf, and who died circa 1764 (Note: Blomefield writes in the family tree between pages 544–545 in the first volume of An essay towards a topographical history of the county of Norfolk that "Wm., their son was an infant in 1702." This is clearly incorrect, as at that point his father had been dead for 13 years. Also, he is mentioned in the will of his maternal grandfather Sir William Scroggs in 1683. Considering he was in Ireland in 1713 and very likely was the Colonel William Wright who lived in Bushy Park prior to his moving to Clontarf, could the "infant" in whatever papers Blomefield had access to actually instead have been an reference to infantry?)

=== The seven children of Robert Wright ===
- Isabella Wright (1703–1775) m. 1) James Graeme (d.1752); 2) 1755 Dr. Thomas Glen
- Anne Wright (1704–1770) m. William Walter (d.1738/39) then married Richard Lambton (possibly son of her father's sister Anne and Freville Lambton)
- Robert Wright (1706–1749) m. 1728 Gibbon Cawood (d.1731/32) m. 1733 Mary Blanyer
- Charles Wright (1707–1777)
- Jermyn Wright (1711–1799)
- Susannah Wright (1717–1763) m. 1737 John Hume (Secretary of the province of Georgia 1779–1781)
- Sir James Wright (1716–1785) m. Sarah Maidman (d.1763). Governor of Georgia 1760–1782. Created Baronet in 1772. Buried in Westminster Abbey
