= Zelotes kuncinyanus =

Scientific classification
- Kingdom: Animalia
- Phylum: Arthropoda
- Subphylum: Chelicerata
- Class: Arachnida
- Order: Araneae
- Infraorder: Araneomorphae
- Family: Gnaphosidae
- Genus: Zelotes
- Species: Z. kuncinyanus

Binomial name
- Zelotes kuncinyanus FitzPatrick, 2007

Species of spider

Zelotes kuncinyanus is a species of spider in the family Gnaphosidae. It is endemic to the Western Cape.

== Distribution ==
Zelotes kuncinyanus is recorded only from the type locality at Sedgefield in the Western Cape, South Africa. The species occurs at an altitude of 38 m above sea level.

== Habitat and ecology ==
Zelotes kuncinyanus are free-running spiders found under stones during the day. The species has been sampled from the Fynbos biome.

== Conservation ==
Zelotes kuncinyanus is listed as Data Deficient for taxonomic reasons. The species is based only on one female that was sampled in 1984. Too little is known about the location, range, and threats of this taxon for an assessment to be made. More sampling is needed to collect the male and determine the distribution range.

== Taxonomy ==
The species was described by FitzPatrick in 2007 from Sedgefield in the Western Cape. The species is known only from the female.
