= Edward Jacob =

Edward Jacob may refer to:

- Edward Jacob (antiquary), English antiquary and mayor
- Edward Jacob (barrister) (c.1795–1841), English legal writer
- Ian Jacob (Edward Ian Jacob), politician and broadcaster

== See also ==
- Edward Jacobs (disambiguation)
