= Hardwick Hall Country Park =

Park in County Durham, England

Coordinates: 54.6559°N 1.4677°W

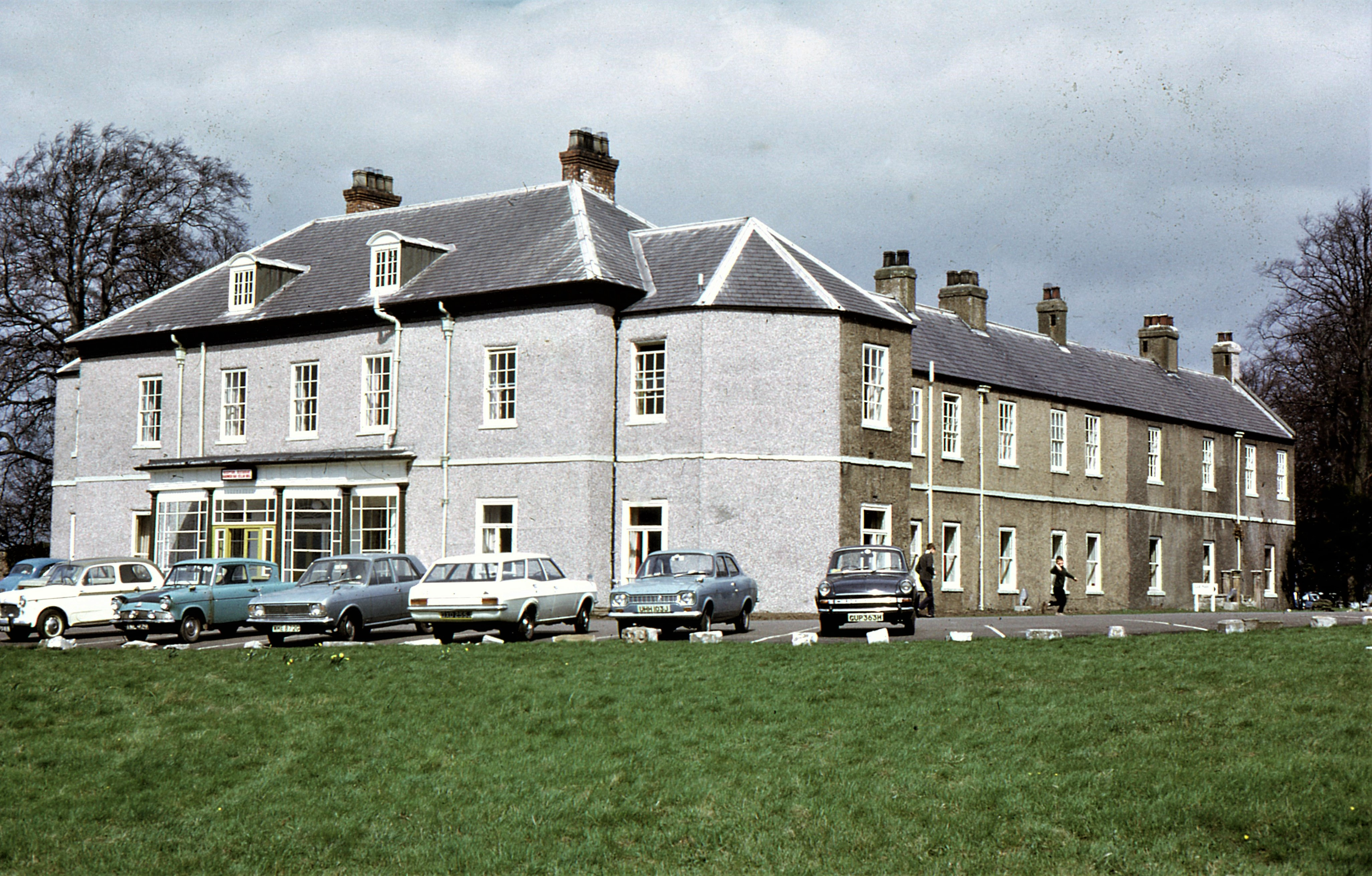
Hardwick Hall

Hardwick Hall Country Park is a park located in County Durham near Sedgefield. Since 7 October 1986, it has been registered on the Register of Parks and Gardens as a Grade II* listed site, which indicates that a park is "of exceptional historic interest."

== History ==
In medieval times, the lands which now comprise the park abutted the manor of Herdwyck.

The 18th century saw dramatic change: a new hall was built, and a new owner—a wealthy businessman from Tyneside named John Burdon—began to develop the grounds. Burdon enhanced the 17-acre (69,000 m^{2}) ornamental lake on the south side of the hall by adding an artificial river leading to it and encircling it with a walkway. In all, he laid out 40 acres (160,000 m^{2}) of additional ornamental features, including temples, grottoes and follies designed primarily by London architect James Paine. Although the grounds and buildings were not subsequently well maintained, the garden retains Paine's basic structure and is an unusual example of authentic 18th-century landscape design.

Durham County Council had already begun to acquire parts of the grounds when in 1997 it determined to undertake the preservation of the whole park. A study commissioned in 1999 provided a detailed estimate of the expenses of restoration and also indicated the property's significance, leading the Register of Parks and Gardens to give it a II* rating. With assistance from the Heritage Lottery Fund, the County purchased more of the grounds in 2001 and launched a restoration scheme to bring it all back to its former condition. The park now includes a visitor centre, café, toilets, exhibition, classroom and office.

Hardwick Hall was also the site of a one-day music event, Hardwick Live, until 2015. Hardwick Live was replaced by a larger two-day event, Down To The Woods, in 2016. The new festival, which had been set to feature headline sets from Catfish and the Bottlemen and Chase and Status, was later cancelled due to the "financial climate".

== Gallery ==
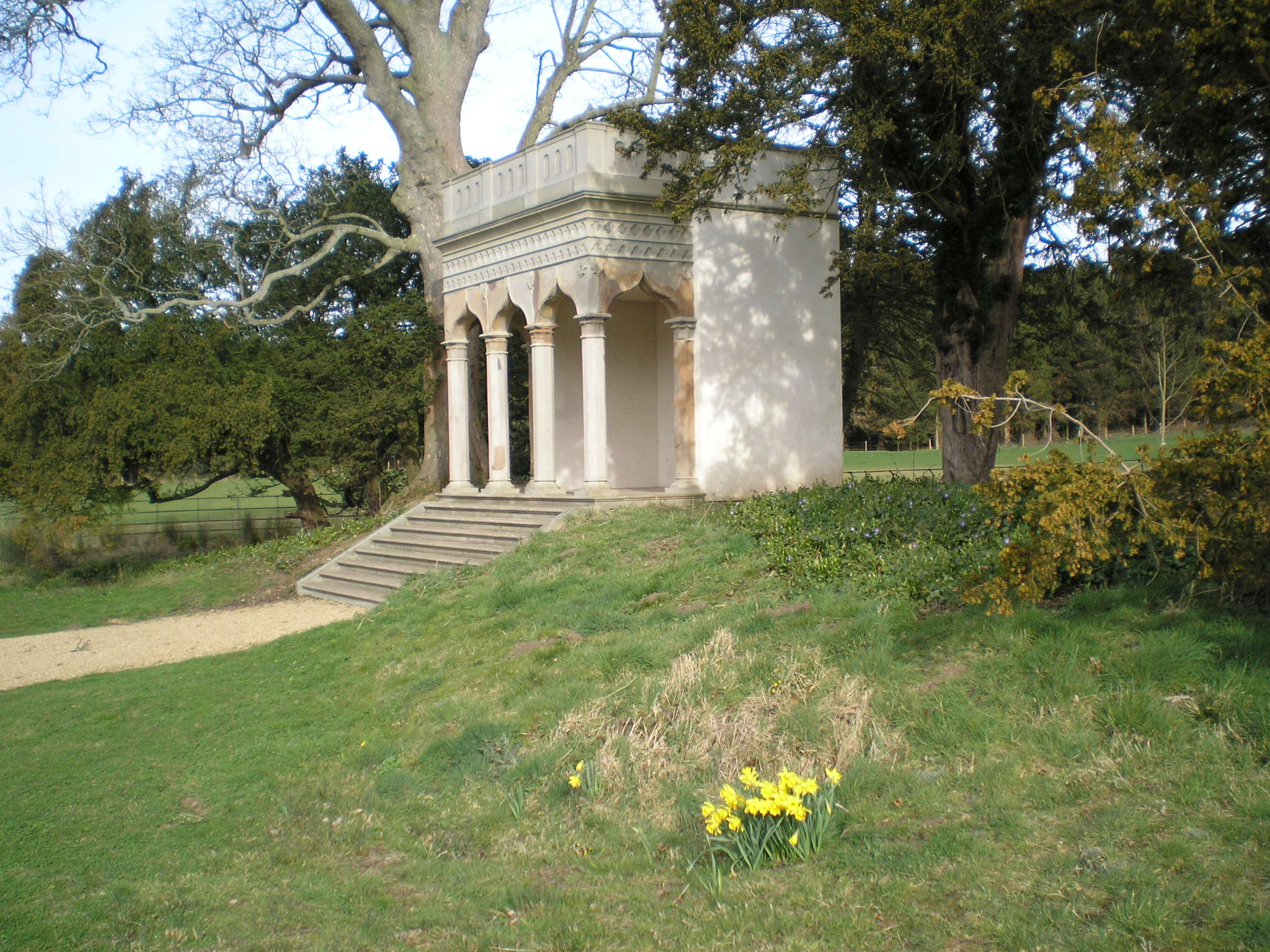

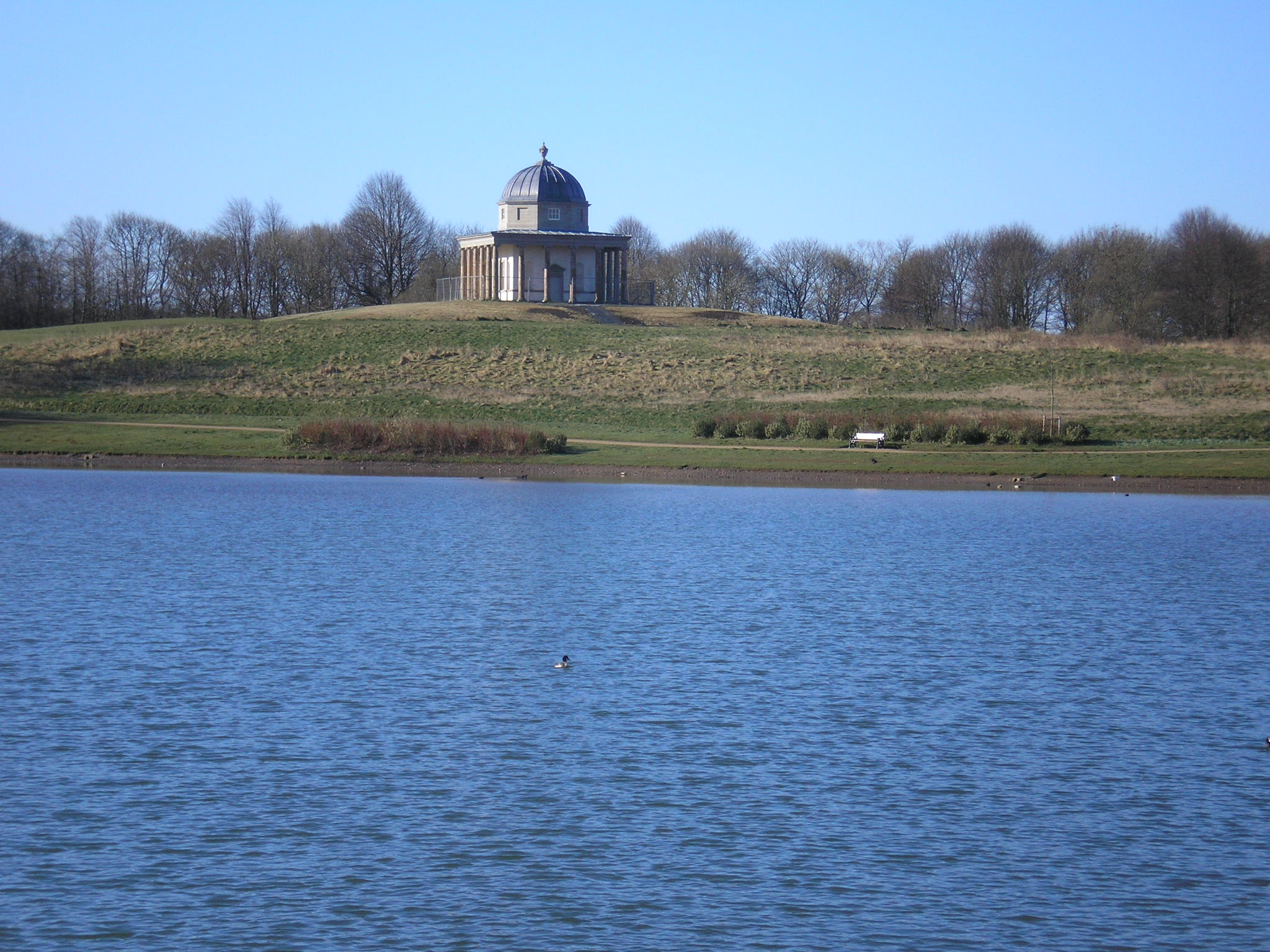

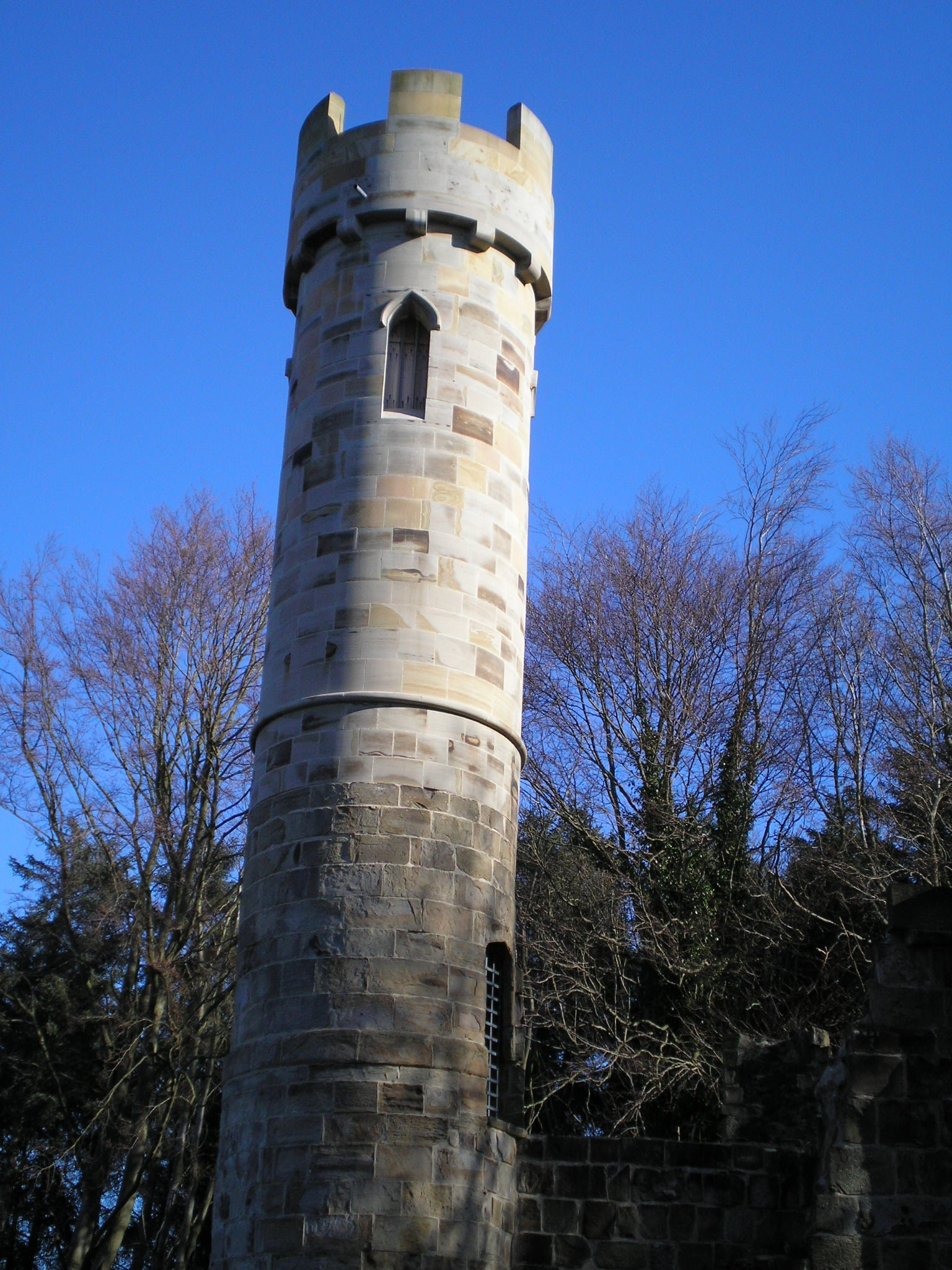

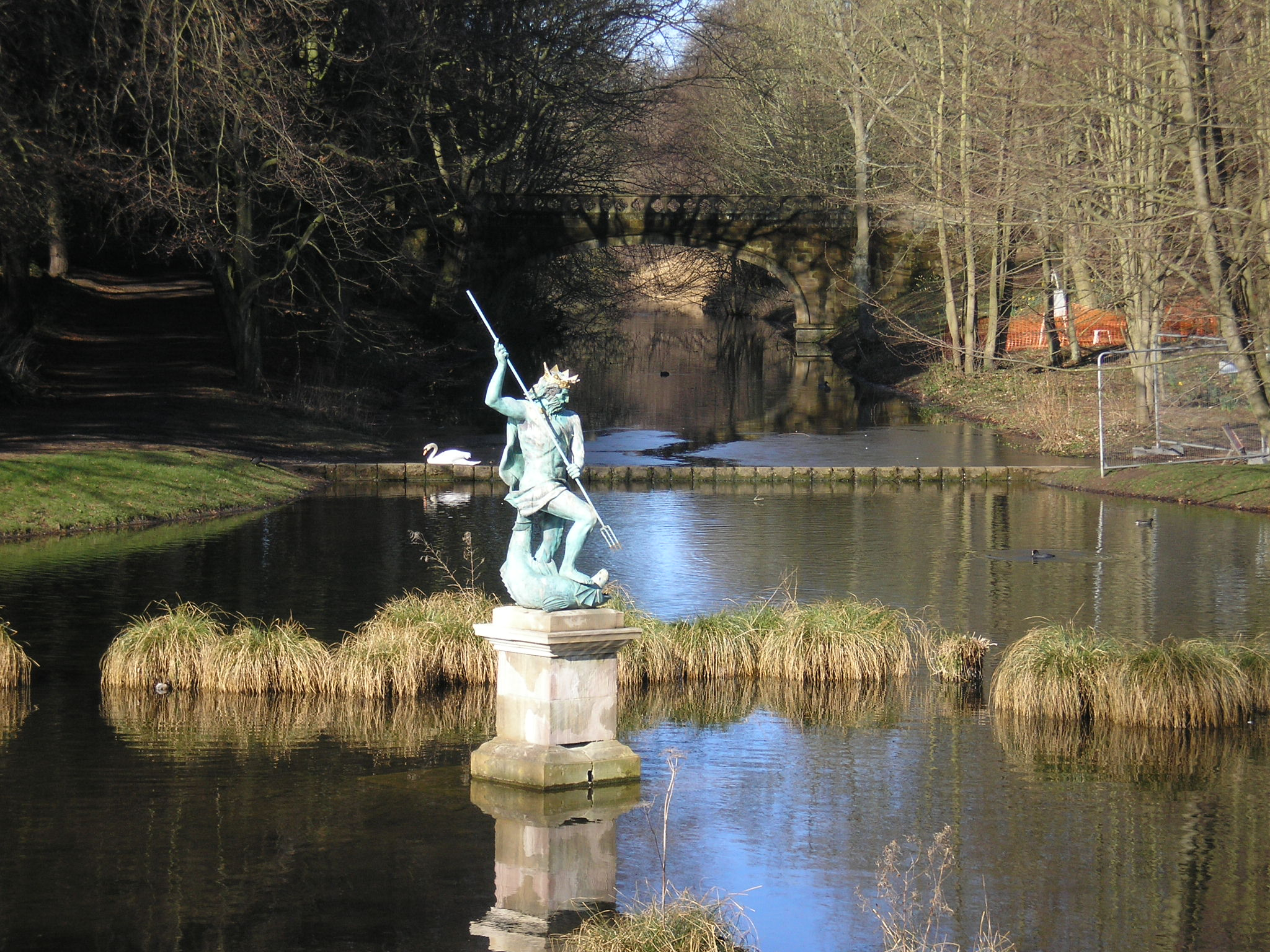
