= Hardwick Hall, County Durham =

Country house hotel in Sedgefield, County Durham, England

Coordinates: 54°39′28.5″N 1°27′55.9″W

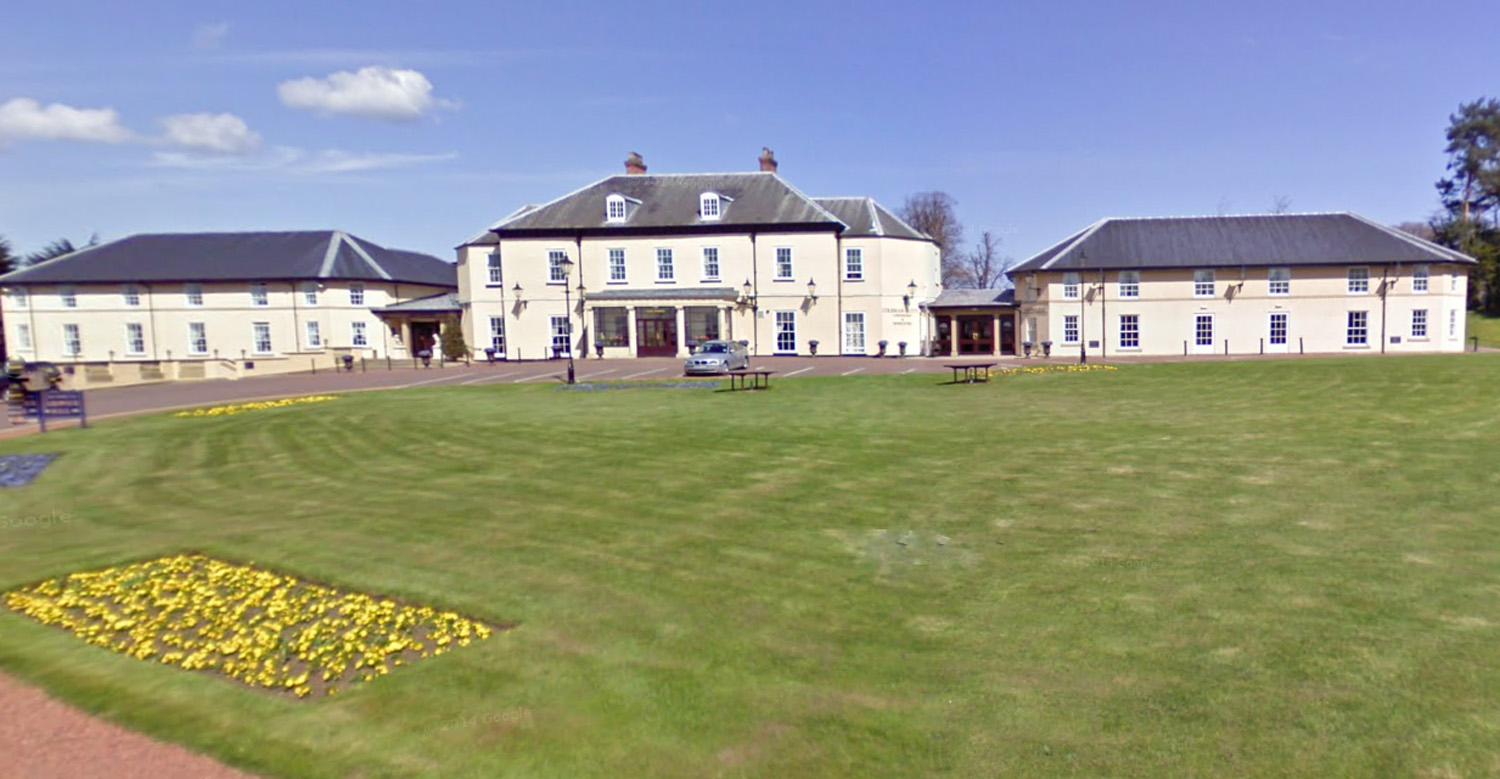
Hardwick Hall Hotel

Hardwick Hall in Sedgefield, County Durham is a building of historical significance and is a Grade II listed building on the English Heritage Register. A major part of it was built in the late 1700s but it is possible that some of it dates from about 1634. It was the residence for many notable people for two centuries. It is now a hotel which provides accommodation and restaurant services and caters for special events particularly weddings.

== Early history ==
Eneas Mackenzie writes in his An Historical, Topographical, and Descriptive View of the County Palatine of Durham (1834) that:

About half a mile west of Sedgefield stands the manor and hall of Hardwick. Under Hatfield's Survey, Roger Fulthorp and John Herdwick held this manor, by homage, fealty, suit of court, and 10s rent. In 1391, Thomas Watkinson, of Elstop, was seized of a moiety of the manor. John de Herdwick died, seized of his proportion, in the 9th year of Bishop Skirlaw; and Agnes, his daughter and heiress, married Gilbert de Hoton, who died in the 12th year of the same prelate, seized in her right, leaving John his son and heir. The families of Cramlington and Killinghall soon after held possessions here; and, in 1500, John Hebborne, in right of Ellen his wife, and William Hansard, in right of Elizabeth his wife, as daughters and coheiresses of John Hoton, had livery of his lands. Soon afterwards, Hardwick appears to have been wholly the estate of the Hebbornes: and John Hebborne, Esq., in 1507, obtained licence to alien the manors or townships of Herdwick and Shotton, nigh Sedgefield, to Anthony Mitford and others; which alienation must have been in trust or settlement, for Anthony Hebborne, Esq.; whilst he was seized of the manor, was attainted of high treason in the Northern Rebellion, and forfeited his manor of Hardwick and lands in Mainsforth and Bishop-Middleham. In the 32d year of Queen Elizabeth, Hardwick was granted, by letters patent, to George Frevill, Esq., as a reward for his services during the rebellion, with remainder to Elizabeth his wife, and to William Jennison, under a reserved rent of £25, 19s. 6d.

== The Frevilles and Lambtons ==
In 1590 the manor of Hardwick was granted to George Freville. He was knighted by King James at York, 17 April 1603. George Freville died childless in 1619, leaving his lands to his younger nephew Nicholas. In 1645 Nicholas compounded for his Hardwick estate. He died in 1674, leaving three daughters and co-heirs, Elizabeth, Mary, and Margaret widow of Thomas Lambton. Freville Lambton, son of Margaret, had Hardwick by the will of his grandfather. He and his mother, then the widow of Nicholas Conyers of Biddick Waterville, made a settlement of the manor in 1687. Freville Lambton married 1) Ann Milward, of Uttoxeter, Stafford; 2) Thomasine Milward; and 3) Anne, daughter of Sir Robert Wright, English judge and Chief Justice of the King’s Bench and sister of Robert Wright for who the Manor House in Sedgefield was built in 1707. By his second wife, he had his son and heir, Thomas, who had six daughters and co-heirs: Barbara, Dorothy, Thomasina, Philadelphia, Margaret and Elizabeth. They sold Hardwick in 1748 to John Burdon, who in 1780 conveyed it to William Russell, retaining a life interest.

== John Burdon ==
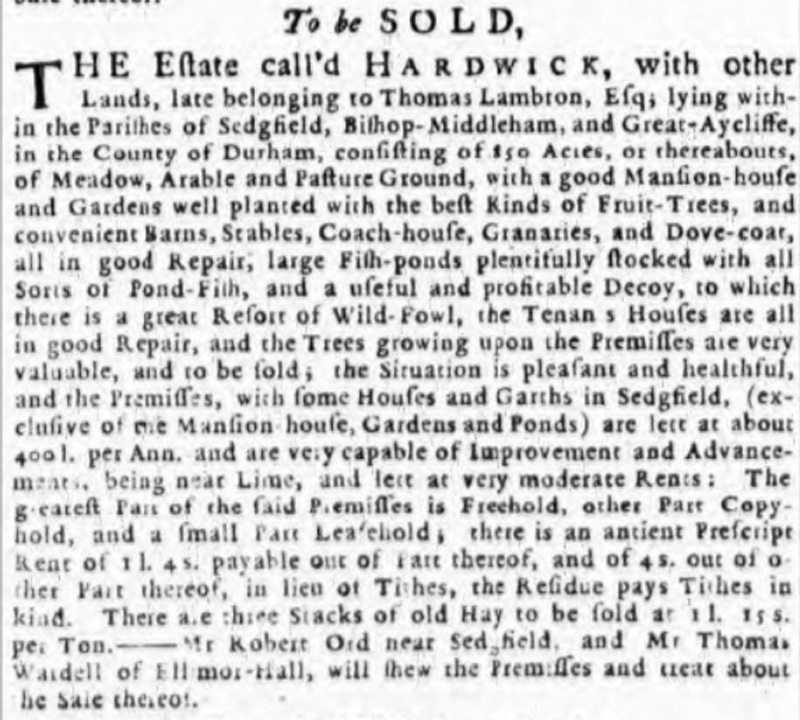
Advertisement for the sale of Hardwick Hall in 1747

John Burdon (1711–1792) is credited as the main originator of Hardwick Hall, though Nikolaus Pevsner believes that he built on an existing manor which was constructed in 1634. The advertisement for the Hardwick Estate sold by the Lambton family in 1747, just before Burdon bought it, states that there exists a "good Mansion House" so it is possible that he made major alterations and additions to this building.

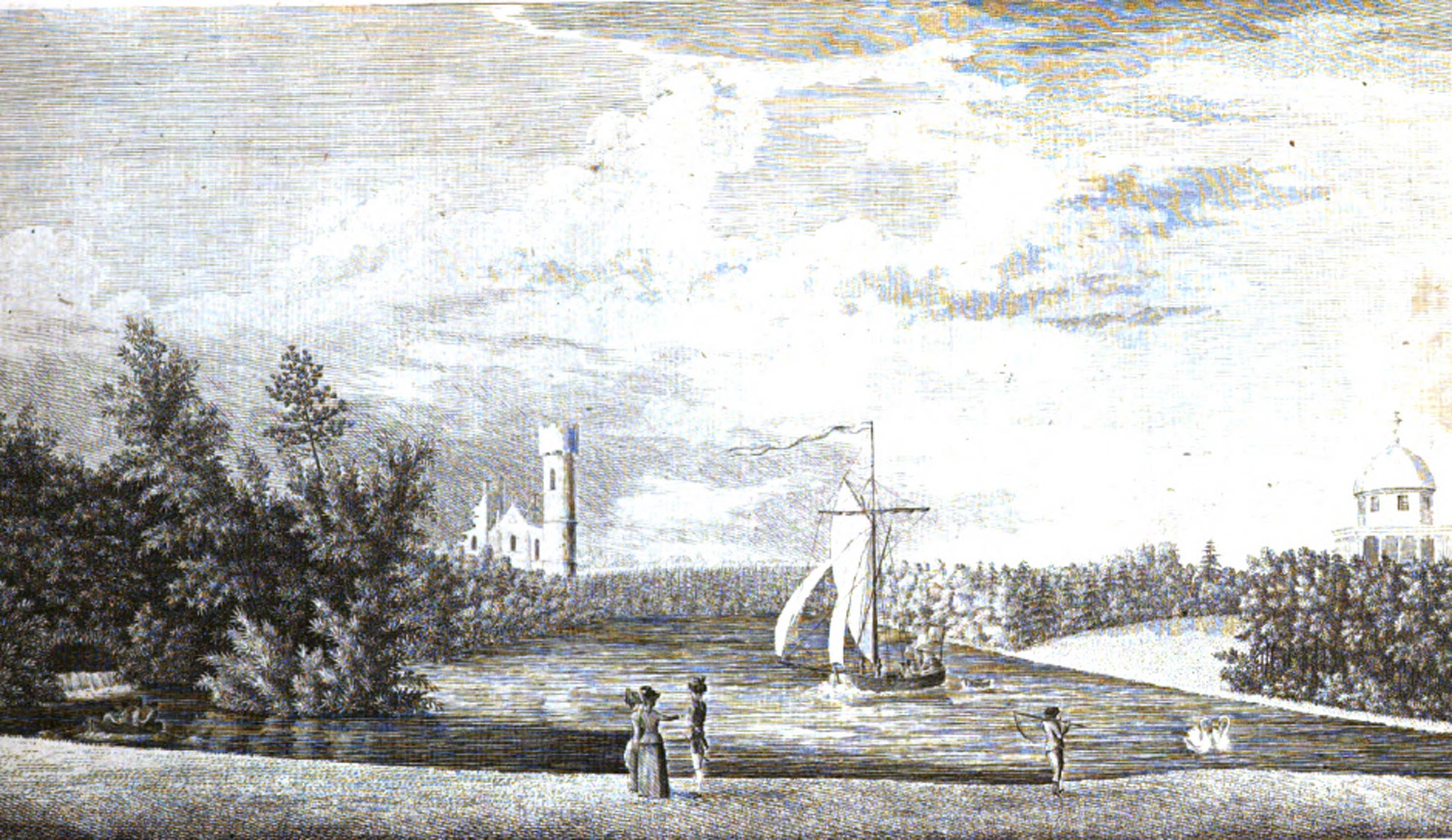
Engraved drawing of Hardwick Hall Park, 1787

John Burdon was born in 1711 in South Shields, then in County Durham. His father was Nicholas Burdon, a wealthy salt and shipping merchant. He remained a bachelor all of his life. When his father died in 1847 John inherited his fortune, and was able to purchase the Hardwick Estate and spend a large sum on elaborate pleasure gardens. The gardens were described in publications of the time: Hutchinson in 1785 says that they are "laid out with exquisite taste" and then details buildings and ornaments. The book includes an engraved drawing of the park which is shown above right.

In 1790 at the age of 79 John sold the Hardwick Estate to William Russell.

== The Russell family ==
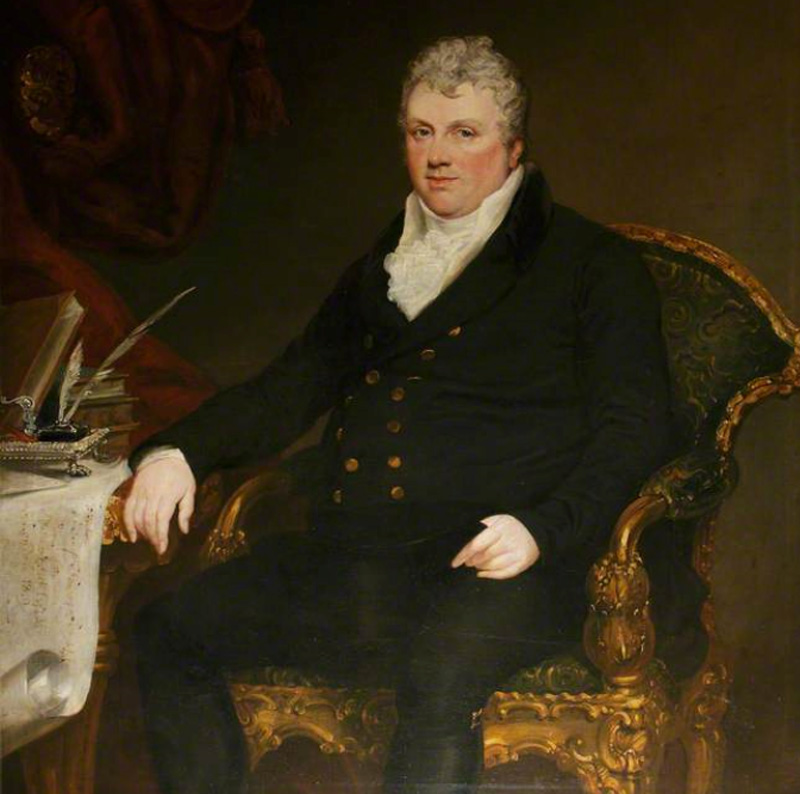
Matthew Russell (1765-1822)

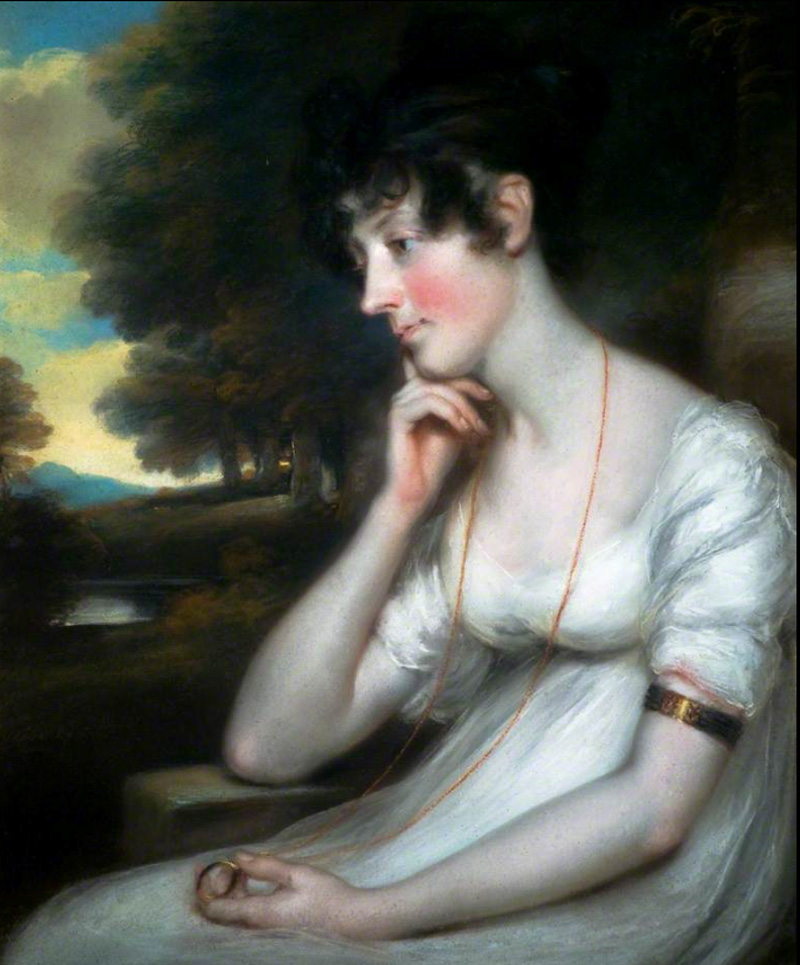
Elizabeth Russell, wife of Matthew Russell

William Russell in 1796 bought Brancepeth Castle. From about his time his son Matthew Russell took over the running of Hardwick Hall and made improvements to the house and garden. In 1798 he married Elizabeth Tennyson, daughter of George Tennyson. In 1817 William Russell died, and Matthew inherited Brancepeth Castle. He died in 1822 and his son William Russell inherited Hardwick Hall, which he leased out. When he died in 1850, his sister Emma Maria both inherited Brancepeth Castle and Hardwick Hall. She had married Gustavus Frederick Hamilton in 1828, and he changed his surname to Hamilton-Russell when she gained the family fortune in 1850. Hardwick Hall was now the property of the Hamilton-Russell family.

== The Hamilton-Russell Family ==
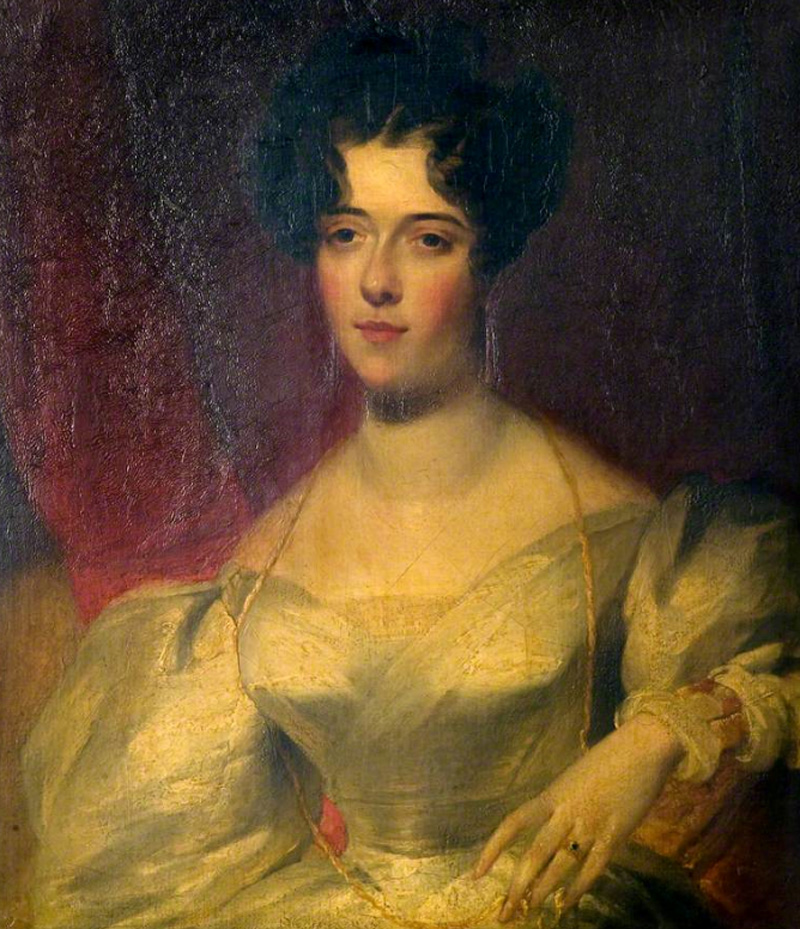
Emma Maria Russell who inherited Hardwick Hall in 1850.

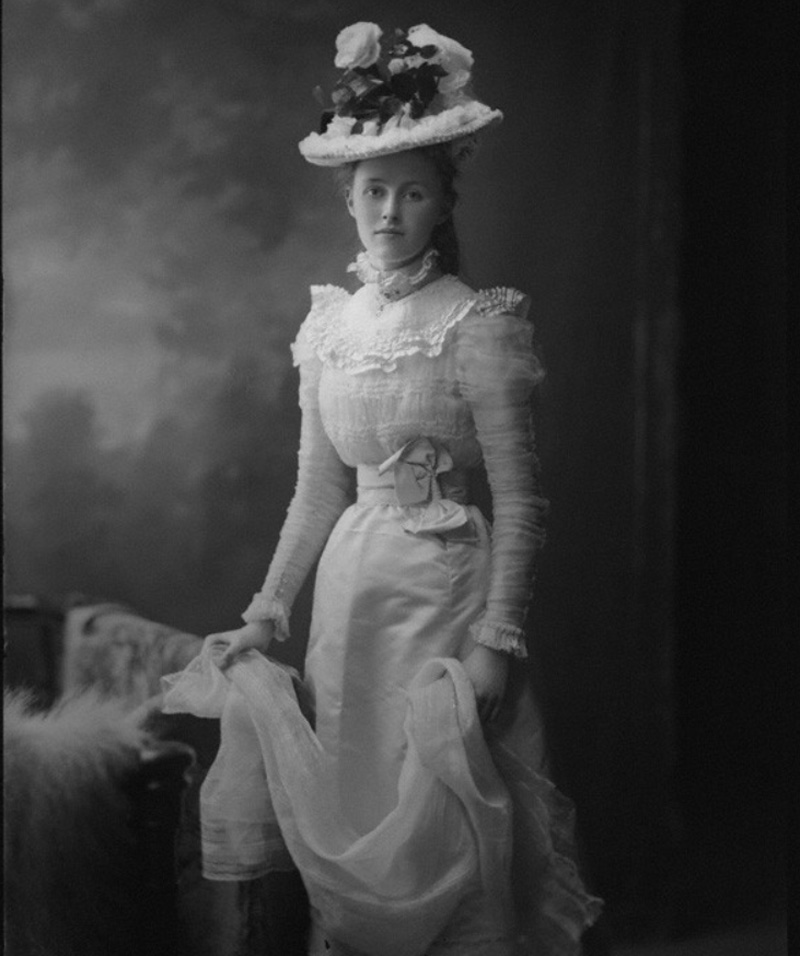
Margaret Selina Lascelles, wife of 9th Viscount Boyne.

Gustavus Frederick Hamilton-Russell was the 7th Viscount Boyne. His father was Gustavus Hamilton 6th Viscount Boyne who owned Burwarton House in Shropshire. He married Emma Maria Russell, the daughter of Matthew Russell (outlined above) in 1828. They lived in London for many years and when Emma inherited Hardwick Hall in 1850 they did not move to the house but instead continued to lease it to tenants.

The 7th Viscount Boyne died in 1872 and his son Gustavus Russell Hamilton-Russell (1830-1907) (8th Viscount Boyne) inherited the Hall but he also continued to rent it out. However, in about 1890 his son Gustavus William Hamilton Russell (who later became 9th Viscount Boyne) decided to live there.

Gustavus William Hamilton Russell 9th Viscount Boyne (1864-1942) was born in 1864 in Ireland. He was educated at Eton and then went to Cambridge University. He managed the Hardwick Hall Estate from about 1885. In 1906 he married Margaret Selena Lascelles. Margaret Lascelles was the sister-in law of Princess Mary, daughter of King George V. Her brother Henry Lascelles was the 6th Earl of Harewood and had married Princess Mary in 1922.

Gustavus and Margaret had six children – five sons and one daughter. Unfortunately three of their sons died in World War II. One of these, John Hamilton-Russell, was married shortly before he went to war, and a film of his wedding which was attended by his aunt Princess Mary is available on the British Pathé website.

== Use as a maternity home ==
After the Second World War, Hardwick Hall was used as a maternity home until the early 1960s. Hardwick Hall was used during the Second World War as an evacuation maternity home during the bombing of nearby Sunderland. It was Grade II listed on 9 January 1968.
