= Edward Herbert (judge) =

English judge

Arms of Herbert: Per pale azure and gules, three lions rampant argent

Sir Edward Herbert (c. 1648 – November 1698), titular Earl of Portland, was an English judge who served as Chief Justice of the King's Bench during the reign of James II.

== Early life and career ==
Herbert was a younger son of Sir Edward Herbert, Lord Keeper to Charles II, and his wife, Margaret, daughter of the Master of Requests, Thomas Smith of Abingdon, Berkshire (now Oxfordshire) & Parson's Green, Middlesex, and widow of Thomas Carey of Sunninghill Park, Berkshire. He was brother of Arthur Herbert, 1st Earl of Torrington and became a scholar of Winchester in 1661, aged 13. He was elected probationer fellow of New College, Oxford, in August 1665, and, having graduated B.A. on 21 April 1609, entered the Middle Temple, where he was called to the bar. He practiced for some years in Ireland, and was there made a King's Counsel on 31 July 1677.

== Judicial advancement ==
Returning to England he was appointed Chief Justice of Chester on 25 October 1683, and on 10 February in the following year was knighted at Whitehall. In January 1684-5 he succeeded Sir John Churchill as Attorney General to the Duke of York, on whose succession to the crown he was appointed Attorney General to the queen. On 15 April he was returned to parliament for Ludlow. Like his father he had the highest notions of the royal prerogative, which much helped his advancement. On 16 Oct. 1685 he was sworn of the Privy Council, and on the 23rd he was called to the degree of Serjeant, giving rings with the significant motto 'Jacobus vincit, triumphat lex,' and the same day took his seat as Chief Justice of the King's Bench in succession to Jeffreys, who had been appointed lord chancellor. Jeffreys characteristically exhorted Herbert on this occasion to 'execute the law to the utmost of its vengeance upon those that are now known, and we have reason to remember them, by the name of whigs,' and 'likewise to remember the snivelling trimmers,' because 'our Saviour Jesus Christ says in the gospel that they that are not for us are against us'.

== Godden v Hales ==
At the Rochester spring assizes in 1686 Sir Edward Hales, a Roman Catholic, was convicted for holding and acting under a commission in the army without taking the sacrament and the oaths of supremacy and allegiance in the manner prescribed by the Test Act. Thereupon his coachman, Arthur Godden, brought a collusive action against him in the king's bench for the prescribed penalty of £500, to which Hales demurred, pleading a dispensation under the great seal. The case was argued before Herbert, who delivered formal judgment as follows : ' (1) That the kings of England are sovereign princes; (2) that the laws of England are the king's laws; (3) that therefore it is an inseparable prerogative in the kings of England to dispense with penal laws in particular cases, and upon particular necessary reasons; (4) that of these reasons and these necessities the king himself is the sole judge.' The plaintiff was accordingly nonsuited. The judgment occasioned general consternation in the country, and the judges were treated with scant respect on circuit. It was impugned as bad in point of law by Sir Robert Atkyns (1621–1709) in a tract entitled ' An Enquiry into the Power of dispensing with Penal Statutes.' Herbert replied with 'A Short Account of the Authorities in Law upon which judgment was given in Sir Edward Hales's case,' in which he argued that 'whatever is not prohibited by the law of God, but was lawful before any act of parliament made to forbid it, the king by his dispensation granted to a particular person may make lawful again to that person who has such dispensation, though it continues unlawful for everybody else.' Atkyns rejoined, and William Atwood, a barrister, also examined Herbert's vindication with much learning and ability.

== Decisions against the king's interest ==
On 14 July 1686 Herbert was placed on the newly created ecclesiastical commission, a tribunal invested with as extensive jurisdiction over the clergy as the old Court of High Commission, and of which Jeffreys was the president. Having, however, refused to abet the king's design of introducing martial law by declining to order the execution of a deserter from the army, he was transferred to the chief-justiceship of the common pleas in April 1687, being succeeded in the king's bench by the more compliant Robert Wright. He still retained his place on the ecclesiastical commission, but gave further offence to the king by expressing the opinion that his proceedings in the case of Magdalen College could not be legalised by any exercise of his dispensing power, and by voting against the inhibition of the recalcitrant fellows from the exercise of their clerical functions.

== Loyalty to James II ==
On the flight of the king Herbert followed him to France and afterwards to Ireland, and was accordingly excepted from the bill of indemnity and included in a Bill of attainder. The latter bill lapsed owing to an early prorogation, but Herbert's estates were sequestrated, the royal palace of Oatlands, Weybridge, Surrey, which had been granted to him by James shortly before his abdication, being given to his brother Arthur, Earl of Torrington, who had taken the opposite side in politics. On the suppression of the Irish rebellion Herbert returned with James to France and resided for a time at St. Germain-en-Laye. He received from James the title of Earl of Portland (in the Jacobite peerage) and the office of Lord Chancellor, and busied himself in writing manifestos for his master. As a Protestant he had never enjoyed James's full confidence, and being a somewhat free speaker he soon lost what he had, was dismissed, and retired to Flanders in the autumn of 1692. He afterwards returned to Saint-Germain-en-Laye, where he subsisted principally on the charity of his brother until his death in November 1698. He was unmarried. Burnet says of him that, though he was but an indifferent lawyer, 'he was a well-bred and a virtuous man, and generous and good-natured.'

Parliament of England
Preceded by Francis Charlton; Charles Baldwyn	MP for Ludlow; 1685 with William Charlton; Sir Josiah Child	Succeeded by Sir Edward Lutwyche; Sir Josiah Child
Legal offices
Preceded by Sir George Jeffreys	Chief Justice of Chester; 1684–1686	Succeeded by Sir Edward Lutwyche
Preceded by George Jeffreys, 1st Baron Jeffreys	Lord Chief Justice; 1685–1687	Succeeded by Robert Wright
Preceded by Sir Henry Bedingfield	Chief Justice of the Common Pleas; 1687–1689	Succeeded by Sir Henry Pollexfen
Peerage of England
New title	— TITULAR — Earl of Portland; Jacobite peerage 1690–1698	Extinct
