= Edward Jacobs =

Edward Jacobs may refer to:

- Ed Jacobs (baseball), Negro league baseball player
- Ed Jacobs (sculptor) (1859–1931), Dutch sculptor who won the Prix de Rome (Netherlands) in 1888
- Eddie Jacobs, American tennis player, Delaware state champion in 1931
- Ed Jacobs, a character on the TV series Dragnet
- Edward Jacobs (composer), composer who is on the faculty at East Carolina University

== See also ==
- Edward Jacob (disambiguation)
