= Edward Jacob (barrister) =

English barrister and legal writer

Edward Jacob (c. 1795–1841) was an English barrister and legal writer.

== Life ==
The son of William Jacob, he was educated at Westminster School. He graduated with a BA in 1816 at Gonville and Caius College, Cambridge, as senior wrangler and first Smith's prizeman. He was subsequently elected Fellow of his college, proceeded MA in 1819, and was called to the bar at Lincoln's Inn on 28 June of that year.

Jacob practised in the chancery court, and was appointed a King's Counsel on 27 December 1834. He died on 15 December 1841.

== Works ==
With John Walker, Jacob edited Reports of Cases in the Court of Chancery during the time of Lord-chancellor Eldon, 1819, 1820, 2 vols. 1821–3; and by himself; a volume of similar reports for 1821 and 1822, published in 1828. He also published with additions a second edition of Roper Stote Donnison Roper's Treatise of the Law of Property arising from the relation between Husband and Wife, 1826. This work was the basis for the Treatise on the Law of Husband and Wife (1849) of John Edward Bright.

== Notes ==
Attribution

This article incorporates text from a publication now in the public domain: Lee, Sidney, ed. (1892). "Jacob, Edward (1795?-1841)". Dictionary of National Biography. Vol. 29. London: Smith, Elder & Co.
