= Sedgefield =

Town and civil parish in County Durham, England

Coordinates: 54.65°N 1.45°W

- Town
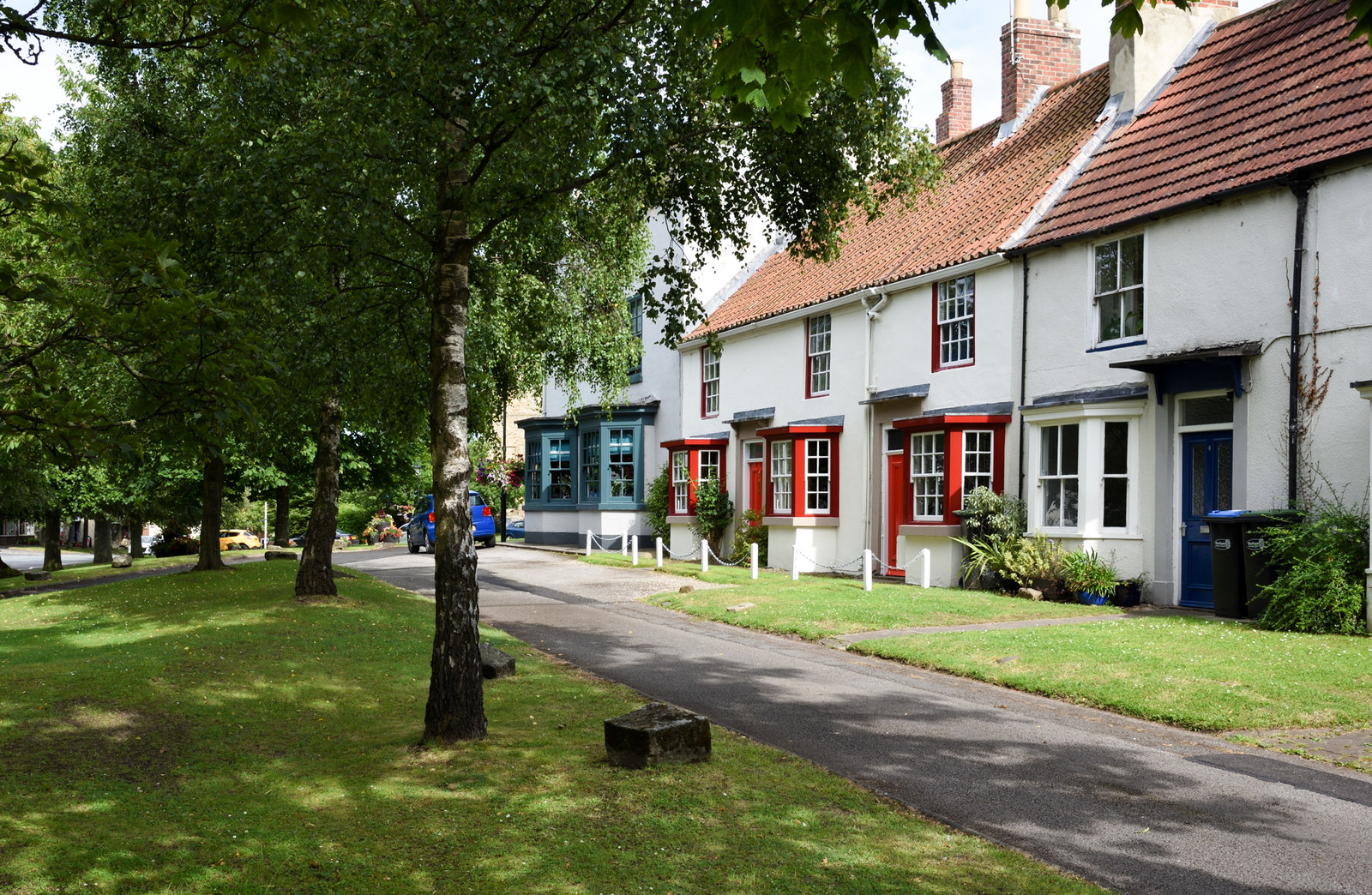
- Houses on The Square

- Location within County Durham
- Population: 5,211 (2011)
- OS grid reference: NZ354286
- Civil parish: Sedgefield
- Unitary authority: County Durham
- Ceremonial county: County Durham
- Region: North East
- Country: England
- Sovereign state: United Kingdom
- Post town: STOCKTON-ON-TEES
- Postcode district: TS21
- Dialling code: 01740
- Police: Durham
- Fire: County Durham and Darlington
- Ambulance: North East
- UK Parliament: Newton Aycliffe and Spennymoor
- Website: Town council website

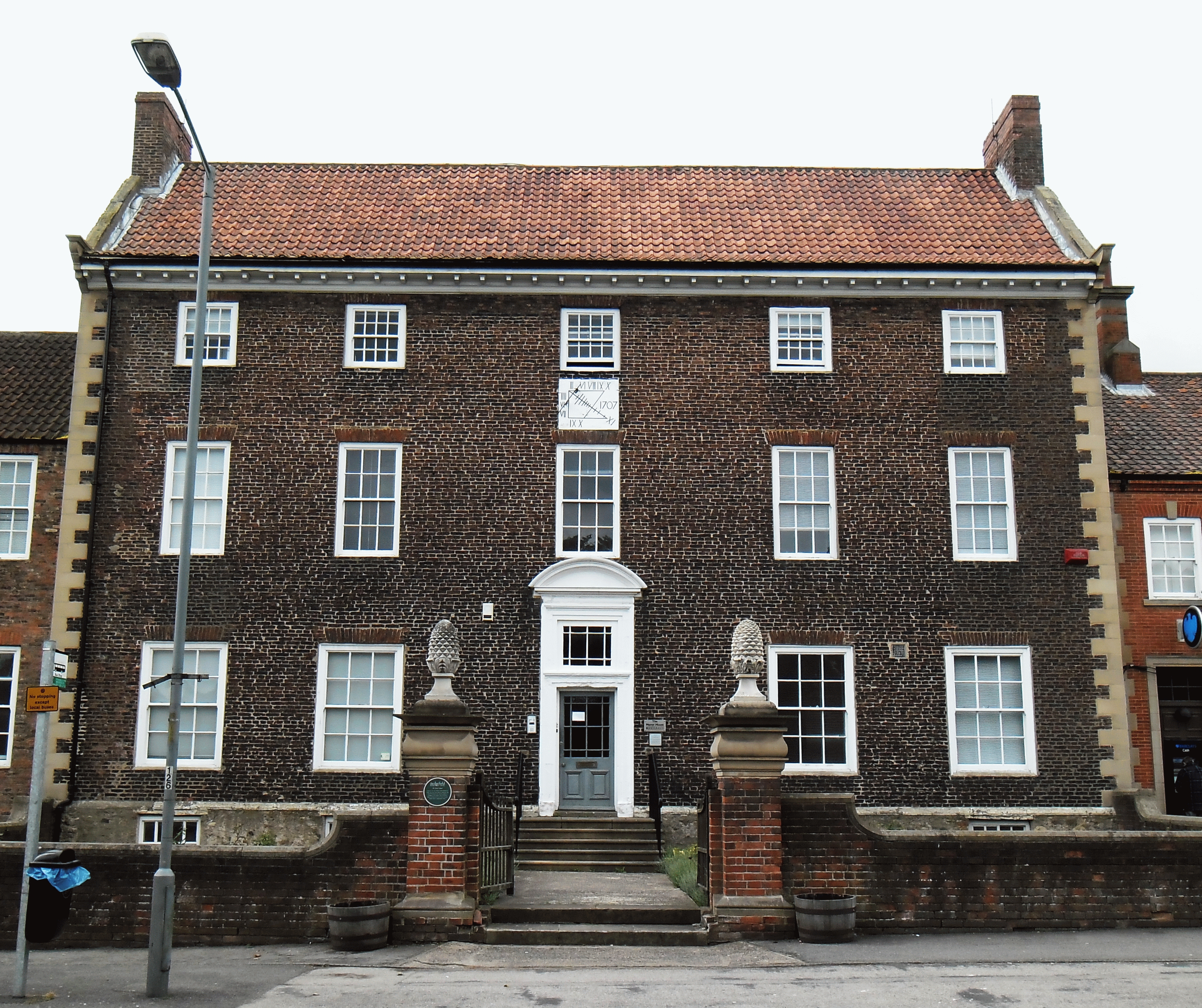
The Manor House in Sedgefield, an example of Queen Anne architecture.

Sedgefield is a market town and civil parish in County Durham, England. It had a population of 4,986 in the 2021 census. It has the only operating racecourse in County Durham.

== Etymology ==
The name Sedgefield is of Old English origin. It is derived from the given-name Cedd + feld (> "field").

== History ==
=== Roman ===
In 2003, a Roman 'ladder settlement' was discovered in fields just to the west of Sedgefield, by Channel Four's Time Team programme. It consisted of rows of parallel crofts and workshops on either side of a north–south trackway, creating a ladder-like layout, which could be securely dated by the many finds of Roman coins.

=== Hunting ===
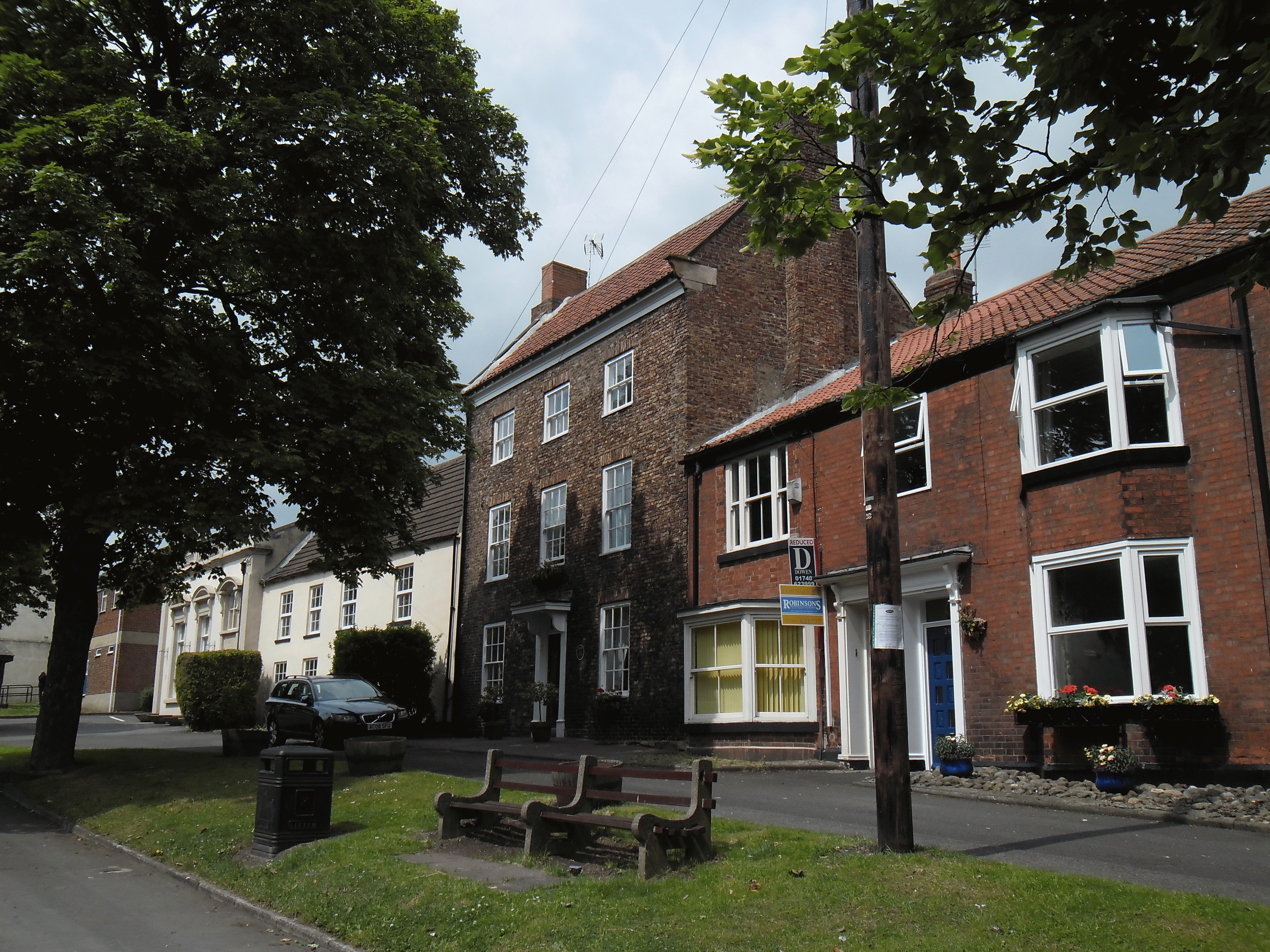
Elm House is a fine example of a Georgian brick three-storey town house.

During the 1800s, it was a hunting centre, dubbed 'the Melton of the North'. Hunter Ralph Lambton had his headquarters at Sedgefield: the humorous writer, Robert Smith Surtees, who lived at Hamsterley Hall, was a friend of his. On 23 February 1815, Lord Darlington wrote: 'Mr Ralph Lambton was out with some gentlemen from Sedgefield, and a most immense field.'

=== Winterton ===
The town was known in the area because of Winterton Hospital. This was an isolation hospital and an asylum. The site was like a village itself with its own fire station, bank and cricket team. Today, little trace is left of the hospital, apart from the church, which is now surrounded by the Winterton housing estate and the NETPark Science park.

The population of the town at the time of the 1841 census was 1,345 inhabitants.

=== Politics ===
The 19th-century South African politician and industrialist Henry Barrington was born in Sedgefield, and actions by his offspring indirectly led to the South African town of Sedgefield, Western Cape, being named in honour of his birthplace.

Sedgefield constituency's Member of Parliament was Tony Blair; he was the area's MP from 1983 to 2007, Leader of the Labour Party from 1994 to 2007 and Prime Minister of the United Kingdom from 1997 to 2007.

During November 2003, Sedgefield was visited by the American president George W. Bush during a state visit. He visited a local pub, as well as the local secondary school (Sedgefield Community College). This event was preceded by high-intensity security, which included fastening down manhole covers and drains, and closing the centre of the town to all traffic. An anti-war protest coincided with his visit.

=== Weather ===
On 17 July 1792 a hailstorm in Sedgefield damaged many houses and filled the streets with hail to a depth of 2 feet.

== Landmarks ==
=== St Edmund's ===
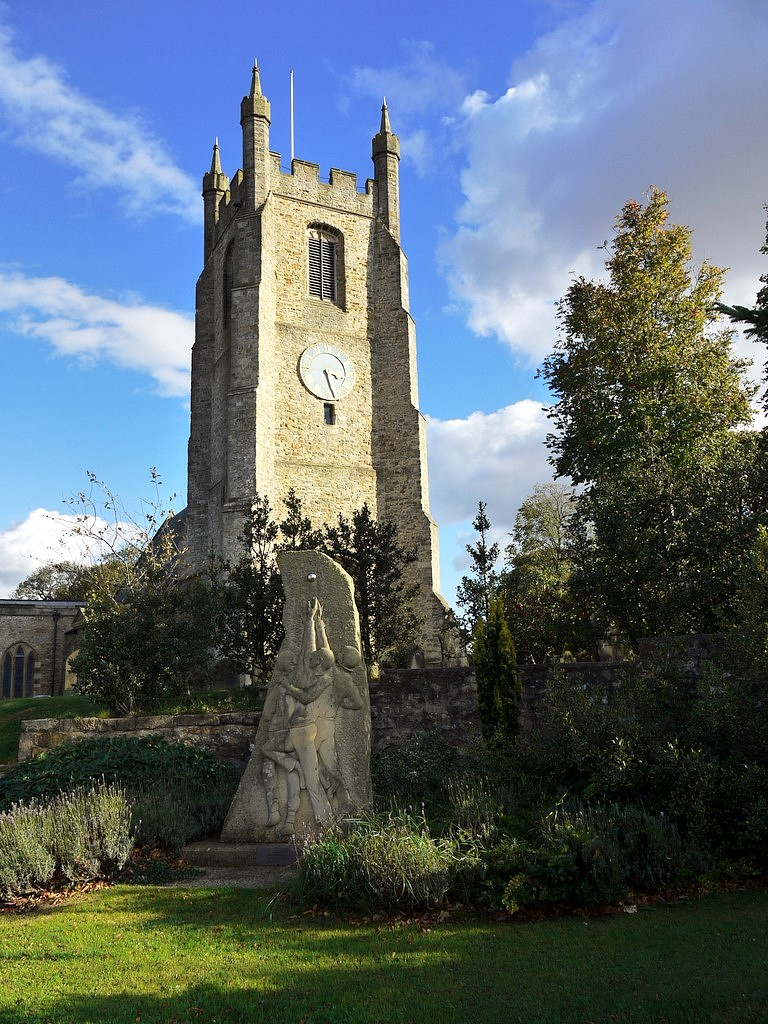
St Edmund's Church and a Shrove Tuesday Ball Game sculpture

The parish of St Edmund was founded by Bishop Cutheard of Lindisfarne, around AD 900. The Normans replaced the original wooden church with the present stone building with rounded arches, and the present church was built between 1246 and 1256, to replace the original wooden church, with later additions. The tower was added in the 15th century by Robert Rodes. Elaborate 17th-century woodwork was installed by John Cosin, bishop of Durham. The church also contains monumental brasses.

=== Ceddesfeld Hall ===
Ceddesfeld Hall was originally the rectory to the church, built after the first rectory burnt down; it is now occupied by the Sedgefield Community Association. A Latin inscription above the door states, "By the generosity of Samuel and Shute Barrington, one an Admiral of the Fleet, the other Bishop of Durham, whose achievements are praised by everyone." The hall was rebuilt in 1793, by the Barringtons, for their nephew, the rector. The grounds, now a public area, were laid out in the mid-18th century to a design by Joseph Spence.

=== The Manor House ===
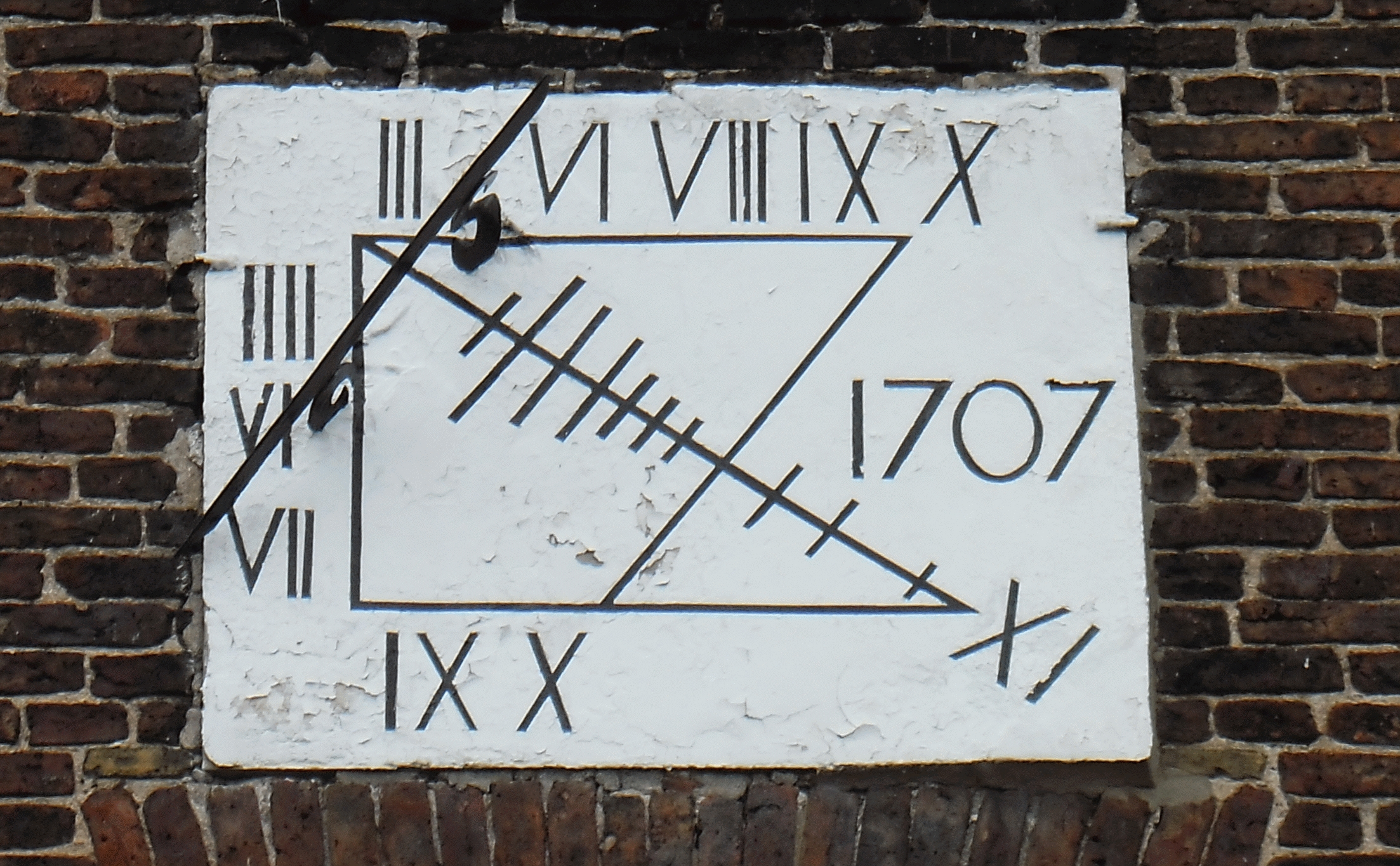
Sundial, dated 1707, on the Sedgefield Manor House.

The Manor House occupies a prominent position at the head of the green. With three storeys it is a fine example of Queen Anne style architecture. Built in 1707 by Robert Wright Esq., as the sundial on the house proclaims. The house was at one time part of the Hardwick Estate (1756–1792), and from 1907 to 1974, the offices of Sedgefield Rural District Council and 1974–1990 Sedgefield Magistrate's Court. The house has been carefully restored and is currently used as a venue for weddings and events as well as being a business hub.

=== Hardwick Hall ===
The 18th century saw the architect James Paine commissioned by John Burdon in 1754 to design and construct a Palladian estate at a historic coaching inn nearby Hardwick. The building work was never completed as Burdon went bankrupt, sufficient landscaping was done to form the basis of what came to be Hardwick Hall Country Park. The area is Grade II* listed on the Register of Historic Parks and Gardens, and the hall, presently the Hardwick Arms Hotel, is Grade II Listed

== Governance ==
In the general election of December 2019 the constituency was won by Conservative MP, Paul Howell, as well as having a local mayor. An electoral ward of the same name exists. This ward includes surrounding areas and at the 2011 census had a population of 6,879.

=== Parish Hall ===
The Parish Hall was founded in 1849 as the Institute of Literature and Science, but later rebuilt as a Mechanics Institute. The hall was extensively refurbished in 2008, and continues to host a wide range of social events and entertainment.

== Education ==
There are two primary schools in Sedgefield, Sedgefield Hardwick and Sedgefield County Primaries, and the secondary school, Sedgefield Community College.

== Culture and customs ==
The town is twinned with Hamminkeln, Germany. The 700th anniversary of the Sedgefield's market charter granting took place in 2012. The market was held on Cross Hill from 1312 until 1918. The original market cross was removed during the 19th century, a new cross was placed during the anniversary year. The new cross was produced by a local designer. A farmers' market is held on the first Sunday of every month.

=== Annual events ===
A Shrove Tuesday Ball Game still takes place in Sedgefield and is an example of Mob Football. A recent statue was erected to commemorate the yearly event; it features a man catching the famous Shrove Tuesday ball.

A popular annual event is the Mediaeval Fair, which takes place in mid-May, and brings the local community and surrounding areas into the closed central streets of Sedgefield, to participate in fun fair rides, and medieval-themed activities.

== Media ==
Local news and television programmes are provided by BBC North East and Cumbria and ITV Tyne Tees. Television signals are received from either the Pontop Pike or Bilsdale TV transmitter.

Local radio stations are BBC Radio Tees, Capital North East, Heart North East, Smooth North East, Greatest Hits Radio North East, Nation Radio North East, Hits Radio Teesside and 'Darlo Radio', a community based station.

The town is served by the local newspaper, The Northern Echo.

== Transport ==
Sedgefield railway station was opened by the Clarence Railway on 11 July 1835, and operated under several companies before the nationalisation of Britain's railways. It closed on 31 March 1952.

Sedgefield continues to be served by public transport. Arriva North East route X22 operates half hourly to Peterlee and hourly to Stockton. Additionally, the X12 operates half hourly to Middlesbrough and half hourly to Durham, with one bus an hour extending to Newcastle.

== Sport ==
=== Horse racing ===
There are a number of sporting venues and organisations in Sedgefield, the most famous of which is probably Sedgefield Racecourse, a regional thoroughbred horse-racing venue. There have been horse races since as early as 1732, and in 1846 officially recognised meetings began.

=== Cricket ===
Sedgefield Cricket Club is situated on the outskirts of the town on Station Road. The ground was donated to the people of Sedgefield around the turn of the nineteenth century and is home to a number of senior and junior teams.

=== Rugby ===
Reformed in 2007, Sedgefield District RUFC are a small club, based at the cricket club, and with their own pitch on grounds overlooking Hardwick East. It is associated with Durham County Rugby Football Union, it was awarded the Whistler Trophy by the Durham County referee society for the most welcoming club for officials and opponents alike.

The first XV currently play in Durham/Northumberland 2 following several successful seasons in Durham/Northumberland Division 3.

=== Motocross ===
At the end of the 1970s a group of friends started gathering to ride their motocross bikes at a farm in Low Hardwick. Today Quad Sport Leisure is one of very few sites in the North East of England where people can legally ride their quad bikes off-road. Occasionally, motocross tracks are available to the public for recreational use, and quads are available for hire suitable for all age groups from infants upwards. A "Bring your own" quad track, designed by a professional quad racer to include two large jumps, is also available.

=== Squash ===
Sedgefield Squash Club has two courts behind Ceddesfield Hall in the village with one being a glass wall. The club has five men's and two ladies' teams in the Durham and Cleveland Leagues and a considerable amount of junior members with the club constantly growing. The club boasts around 12 internal leagues where players are constantly changing their rankings. It has had a refurbishment in 2020–2021.

=== Football ===
Sedgefield Youth Football Club (SYFC) run several teams in both the Teesside junior football alliance and the Russel Foster Youth League. . They are based at the local community college.

=== Tennis ===
Sedgefield Tennis Club play on three courts at the Community College. The club enters one Ladies team, one Mixed Team, and two Men's teams in the Cleveland Tennis League. Sedgefield ST Edmunds F.C play in the Swinburn Maddison Premier League.

=== Golf ===
Knotty Hill Golf Centre is a 45-hole golf course, opened in the mid-nineties. The Princes and the Bishops courses are both 18 holes and another nine holes is made up by the academy course.

=== Running ===
Sedgefield Harriers are a local running and athletics club based at Sedgefield Community College. They compete in road races, in fell races (mainly on the North York Moors), in cross country and on the track. There is a large junior section which competes in track and field competitions and cross country. The club hosts the Serpentine Trail Race each September, Summer and Winter open handicaps in January and July and the Neptune Relays in April.

In 2011, Sedgefield Harriers were recognised by England Athletics as National Development Club of the Year and by UK Athletics as Club of the Year. In 2012 the club was County Durham Sports Club of the Year. In December 2020 the club announced plans for an athletics track and associated facilities to the north of Sedgefield under the project name of EDCAT (East Durham Community Athletics Track).

== Notable people ==
- John Blakiston, Member of Parliament who was one of the regicides of King Charles I of England
- Stan Cummins, footballer who played for Middlesbrough and Sunderland, as well as playing in America
- Aidan Davison, footballer born in Sedgefield who represented the Northern Ireland national football team
- Dave Hockaday, footballer and coach who managed Leeds United in 2014
- Thomas H. McIntosh, former secretary manager of Darlington, Middlesbrough and Everton. Under McIntosh's guidance Everton won the FA Cup in 1933 and twice won the Football League First Division.
- Vaughan Oliver, artist and graphic designer who is best known for his work with 4AD Records
- Bradley Saunders, professional boxer. Born in Stockton-on-Tees but lives in Sedgefield.
- Jack Smith, wheelchair rugby athlete and a gold medal-winning member of the Great Britain national wheelchair rugby team.
- Peter Willey, former cricketer and umpire
