= Roper Stote Donnison Roper =

English legal writer

Roper Stote Donnison Roper (1771–1822) was an English legal writer.

== Life ==
Born Roper Stote Donnison on 9 March 1771, he was only son of the Rev. Watson Stote Donnison of Trimdon, Durham. Through his mother, Elizabeth, daughter and heiress of Jonathan Sparke of Hutton-Henry, by Elizabeth daughter of William Roper of Clayport), he became heir to the Trimdon estates, the property of the Roper family, and at the age of about twenty-five assumed the surname of Roper.

On 29 March 1793 Roper was admitted at Gray's Inn, and on 6 February 1799 was called to the bar. In 1805 he appeared in the Law List as of 2 Lincoln's Inn Square, equity draughtsman.

== Works ==
Roper was the author of legal works:

- Treatise upon the Law of Legacies (1799) was reissued in 1805. It was commended by Lord Eldon, Story, and Kent. The author at his death left a revision of some of it, and the work was completed by Henry Hopley White, and issued in two volumes, 1828, as a third edition. A fourth edition appeared in 1847, and a second American edition in 1848.
- Treatise on the Revocation and Republication of Wills and Testaments, together with tracts upon the law concerning Baron and Ferme, 1800 (American edition, 1803).
- Treatise on the Law of Property arising from the Relation between Husband and Wife, 1820, 2 vols. A second edition, with additions, was issued by Edward Jacob in 1826, and American editions appeared in 1824, 1841, and 1850. John Edward Bright's Treatise on the Law of Husband and Wife (1849) was largely based on it.

== Family ==
Roper Stote Donnison Rowe Roper of Trimdon, the son of his sister Maria Jemima Stote née Donnison (1785–1815) and her husband Thomas Tiplady Rowe (1782–?), married, 25 October 1838, Jemima Margaret, daughter of the Rev. John Gilpin of Sedbury Park, Yorkshire.

== Notes ==
Attribution

This article incorporates text from a publication now in the public domain: Lee, Sidney, ed. (1897). "Roper, Roper Stote Donnison". Dictionary of National Biography. Vol. 49. London: Smith, Elder & Co.
