= Church of St Edmund, Sedgefield =

Coordinates: 54.6533°N 1.4485°W

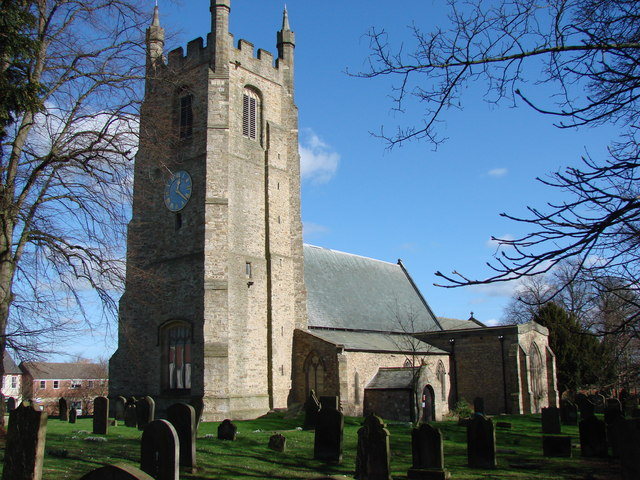
- Church of St Edmund, Sedgefield
- OS grid reference: NZ 35680 28823
- Location: Cross Hill, Sedgefield, County Durham, TS21 3AT
- Country: England
- Denomination: Church of England
- Churchmanship: Central

History
- Status: Active
- Dedication: Edmund of Abingdon

Architecture
- Functional status: Parish church
- Heritage designation: Grade I listed
- Designated: 9 January 1968
- Years built: 1246 to 1256

Administration
- Diocese: Diocese of Durham
- Archdeaconry: Archdeaconry of Auckland
- Parish: Upper Skerne

Clergy
- Rector: The Revd David Lucas

The Church of St Edmund is a Church of England parish church in Sedgefield, County Durham. The church is a Grade I listed building and dates from the 13th century.

== History ==
The parish of Sedgefield was created by Cutheard of Lindisfarne during his time as Bishop of Lindisfarne (between 900 and 915). The first church was likely made of wood and this was replaced with a stone church by the Normans.

From 1246 to 1256, the current church was built. The church is dedicated to Edmund of Abingdon, a former Archbishop of Canterbury who died in 1240 (shortly before the church was built). There have been a number of additions to the building: in c.1290 transepts and a chancel were added; c.1490 a tower was added; in the 19th century a porch was added; and a vestry and organ chamber were added in 1913.

The chancel of the church was furnished in the seventeenth century with a substantial screen, choir stalls, panelling and sanctuary in the style of woodwork known locally as ‘Cosin Woodwork’, found also in Durham Cathedral, Auckland Castle Chapel, and, to a lesser extent in several other churches in the Diocese.

On 9 January 1968, the church was designated a grade I listed building.

== Present day ==
Today, the Church of St Edmund is part of the Benefice of Upper Skerne in the Stockton Deanery in the Archdeaconry of Auckland within the Diocese of Durham. The church stands in the Central tradition of the Church of England.

== Notable clergy ==
- Walter de Merton, later Founder of Merton College, Oxford and Bishop of Rochester, held the Rectory in the 1240s at the time of the building of the present church, while working as secretary for Nicholas Farnham, Bishop of Durham
- George Howe, later Archdeacon of Westmorland and Furness, served as Rector of the parish from 1985 to 1991
