= Robert Wright (judge, died 1689) =

English judge (c. 1634–1689)

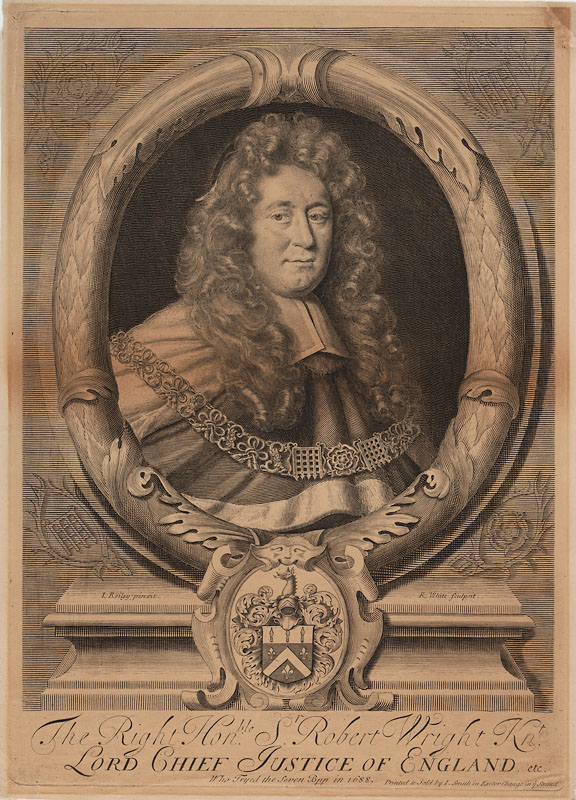
Sir Robert Wright

Sir Robert Wright (c. 1634 – 1689) was an English judge and Chief Justice of the King's Bench 1687–89.

== Early life ==
Wright was the son of Jermyn Wright of Wangford in Suffolk, by his wife Anne, daughter of Richard Batchcroft of Bexwell in Norfolk. He was descended from a family long seated at Kilverstone, also known as Kelverstone, in Norfolk, and was educated at the free school at Thetford. He was admitted to Caius College, Cambridge on 1 April 1651.

== Early legal career ==
He entered Lincoln's Inn on 14 June 1654, and after being called to the bar went the Norfolk circuit. According to Roger North he was "a comely person, airy and nourishing both in his habits and way of living", but a very poor lawyer. He was a friend of Roger's brother, Francis North, and relied implicitly on him when required to give a written opinion (North later developed a deep contempt for Wright). Although by marrying the daughter of the Bishop of Ely he obtained a good practice, his "voluptuous unthinking course of life" led him into great embarrassments. These he evaded by pledging his estate to Francis North, and afterwards mortgaging it to Sir Walter Plummer, fraudulently tendering him an affidavit that it was clear of all encumbrances.

On 10 April 1668 Wright was returned to parliament for King's Lynn. In 1678 he was appointed counsel for the University of Cambridge, and in August 1679 he was elected deputy recorder of the town. In October 1678 he fell under suspicion of being concerned in the Popish Plot, Edward Coleman, one of the supposed ringleaders of the Plot, having been in his company the Sunday before he was committed to Newgate. On 31 October the matter was brought by the Speaker before the House of Commons, which ordered Wright's chambers in Lincoln's Inn and his lodgings to be searched. As nothing was found to incriminate him, he was declared completely exculpated. In Easter 1679 he was made a Serjeant, and on 12 May 1680 he was made a King's Serjeant. He was knighted on 15 May, and in 1681 was appointed chief justice of Glamorgan.

At this time his fortunes were at low ebb. He had made the acquaintance of Jeffreys, and had acquired his regard, it is said, by his ability as a mimic. He went to him and implored his assistance. Jeffreys had recourse to the king, and in spite of the vehement objections of Francis North, Lord Keeper of the Great Seal, who described him as ignorant, dishonest and utterly unfit to be a judge, procured his nomination on 27 Oct. 1684 as a Baron of the Exchequer. On 10 Feb. 1684-5 he was elected Recorder of Cambridge. James II selected him to accompany Jeffreys on the western assize after Monmouth's rebellion, and on his return removed him on 11 Oct. to the King's Bench. In 1686, in the case of Sir Edward Hales, Wright gave an opinion in favour of the dispensing power, when consulted by Sir Edward Herbert, previous to judgment being given in court in favour of Hales.

== Chief Justice ==
On 6 April 1687 he was promoted to the chief-justiceship of the Common Pleas on the death of Sir Henry Bedingfield. This office he held only five days, for Herbert, having refused to assist the king to establish martial law in the army in time of peace by countenancing the execution of a deserter, was transferred to the chief-justiceship of the Common Pleas. Wright, who took his place as Chief Justice of the King's Bench, hanged deserters without hesitation. He gave further proof of his zeal by fining the Earl of Devonshire, an opponent of the court, the sum of £30,000 for assaulting Colonel Thomas Colepeper in the Vane chamber at Whitehall while the king and queen were in the presence, overruling his plea of privilege, and committing him to prison until the fine was paid. Wright accompanied the sentence with the remark that the offence was ' next door to pulling the king off his throne.'

In October 1687 Wright was sent to Oxford as an ecclesiastical commissioner with Thomas Cartwright (1634–1689) and Sir Thomas Jenner on the famous visitation of Magdalen College, Oxford when all the fellows but three were expelled for resisting the royal authority, and declared incapable of holding any ecclesiastical preferment. When the president of Magdalen, John Hough, protested against the proceedings of the commission, Wright declared that he would uphold his majesty's authority while he had breath in his body, and bound him over in a thousand pounds to appear before the king's bench on the charge of breaking the peace.

On 29 June 1688 Wright presided at the trial of the Seven Bishops. Although he so far accommodated himself to the king as to declare their petition a libel, he was overawed during the trial by the general voice of opinion and the apprehension of an indictment. In the words of a bystander "he looked as if all the peers present had halters in their pockets". He conducted the proceedings with decency and impartiality, apart from his obvious antipathy to the Solicitor General, William Williams, whom he accused, irrelevantly, of taking bribes. At an early stage the evidence of publication broke down, and Wright was about to direct the jury to acquit the prisoners when the prosecution was saved by the testimony of Sunderland. In his charge, while declaring in favour of the right of the subject to petition, he gave it as his opinion that the particular petition before the court was improperly worded, and was, in the contemplation of the law, a libel. He failed, however, to pronounce definitely in favour of the dispensing power of the crown. For this omission, his dismissal was afterwards contemplated, and he was probably saved by the difficulty of finding a successor.

In December 1688 the Prince of Orange caused two impeachments of high treason against Jeffreys and Wright to be printed at Exeter. Wright was accused among other offences of taking bribes "to that degree of corruption as is a shame to any court of justice". He continued to sit in court until the flight of James on 11 Dec. He then sought safety in concealment, and on 10 Jan. 1688-9 addressed a supplicating letter to the Earl of Danby asserting that he had always opposed popery, and had been compelled to act against his inclinations. His hiding-place in the Old Bailey was discovered by Sir William Waller (d. 1699) on 13 February, and he was taken before Sir John Chapman, the Lord Mayor of London, who committed him to Newgate on the charge that, "being one of the judges of the Court of King's Bench, he had endeavoured the subversion of the established government by alloweing of a power to dispence with the laws; and that hee was one of the commissioners for ecclesiastical affairs." On 6 May he was brought before the House of Lords for his action in regard to the Earl of Devonshire: but, although his overruling the earl's plea of privilege and committing him to prison was declared a manifest breach of privilege of parliament, no further action was taken against him. On 18 May he died of fever in Newgate. In the debate on the act of indemnity on 18 June, it was determined to except him from the act in spite of his decease. His name, however, does not appear in the final draft of the act.

== Family life ==
Wright married three times. His first wife was Dorothy Moor of Wiggenhall St. Germans in Norfolk. She died in 1662 without issue, and he married, secondly, Susan, daughter of Matthew Wren, Bishop of Ely; and thirdly, Anne, daughter of Sir William Scroggs, Lord Chief Justice of England. By his second wife he had four daughters and one son, Robert, father of Sir James Wright. By his third wife he had three daughters. His portrait was painted by John Riley in 1687 and engraved by Robert White.
