= Baron Fisher =

Title in the Peerage of United Kingdom

Baron Fisher of Kilverstone
- Blazon: Arms: Argent in chief two Demi Lions rampant erased Gules and in base the Stern of an Ancient Battle-ship showing three Lanterns proper; Crests: A Dexter Hand in Mail Armour couped at the wrist grasping the Head of a Trident erect all proper.; Supporters: On either side a Sailor of the Royal Navy supporting in the exterior hand an Anchor cabled that to the dexter in bend sinister and that to the sinister in bend dexter all proper
- Creation date: 14 December 1909
- Created by: Edward VII
- Peerage: United Kingdom
- First holder: John Fisher, 1st Baron Fisher
- Present holder: Patrick Fisher, 4th Baron Fisher
- Heir apparent: Hon. Benjamin Carnegie Vavasseur Fisher
- Remainder to: 1st Baron's heirs male of the body lawfully begotten
- Status: Extant
- Seat: Kilverstone Hall
- Motto: Fear God and Dread Nought

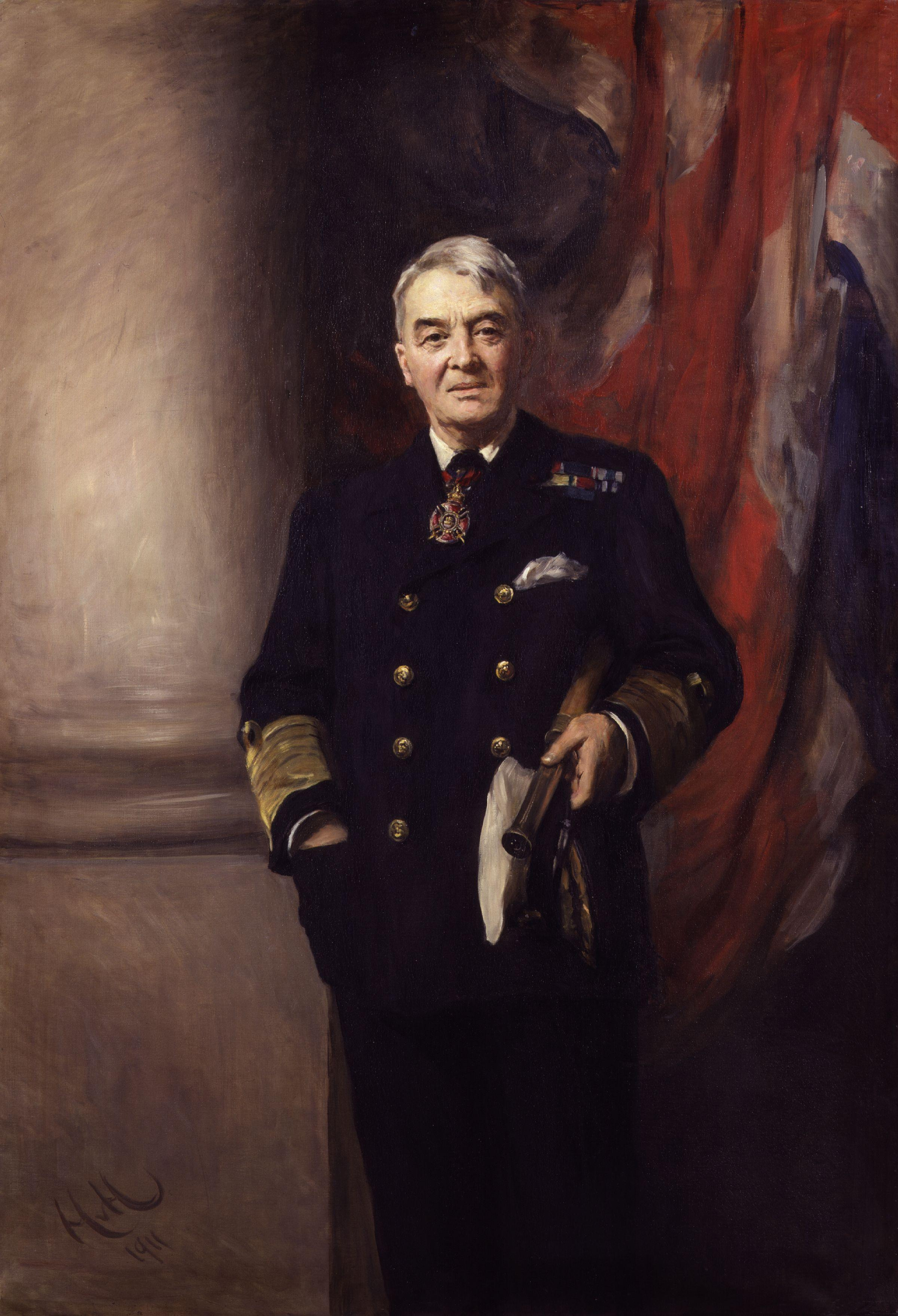
John Fisher, 1st Baron Fisher.

Baron Fisher, of Kilverstone in the County of Norfolk, is a title in the Peerage of the United Kingdom. It was created in 1909 for the noted naval reformer Admiral of the Fleet Sir John Fisher.

His son Cecil Fisher, the second Baron, was the adoptive heir of Josiah Vavasseur (1834–1908), an arms manufacturer. Vavasseur left part of his enormous estate to Fisher on the condition that he adopt the Vavasseur name; Fisher assumed the additional surname of Vavasseur in 1909 by royal licence. As of 2017 the title is held by his grandson, the fourth Baron, who succeeded in 2012.

The family seat is Kilverstone Hall, near Kilverstone, Norfolk.

== Line of succession ==
- John Arbuthnot Fisher, 1st Baron Fisher (1841–1920)
  - Cecil Vavasseur Fisher, 2nd Baron Fisher (1868–1955)
    - John Vavasseur Fisher, 3rd Baron Fisher (1921–2012)
      - Patrick Vavasseur Fisher, 4th Baron Fisher (b. 1953)
        - (1) Hon. Benjamin Carnegie Vavasseur Fisher (b. 1986)
        - (2) Hon. Robin Carnegie Vavasseur Fisher (b. 1996)
      - (3) Hon. Benjamin Vavasseur Fisher (b. 1958)
        - (4) Peter Vavasseur Fisher (b. 1986)

The heir apparent is the present holder's second son, the Hon. Benjamin Carnegie Vavasseur Fisher (b. 1986), who is married to Katy Lee Fisher. His elder brother, the Hon. John Carnegie Vavasseur Fisher (b. 1979), died on 2 August 2015.
