= East Tuddenham =

Village in Norfolk, England

Coordinates: 52.662°N 1.082°E

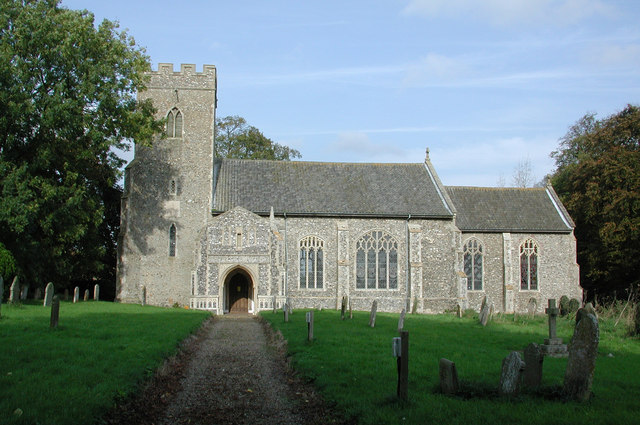
- All Saints' Church

- Location within Norfolk
- Area: 3.27 sq mi (8.5 km^{2})
- Population: 516 (2021 census)
  - Density: 158/sq mi (61/km^{2})
- OS grid reference: TG0852011600
- District: Breckland
- Shire county: Norfolk
- Region: East
- Country: England
- Sovereign state: United Kingdom
- Post town: DEREHAM
- Postcode district: NR20
- Dialling code: 01603
- Police: Norfolk
- Fire: Norfolk
- Ambulance: East of England
- UK Parliament: Mid Norfolk
- Website: www.easttuddenham.com

East Tuddenham is a village and civil parish in the English county of Norfolk.

The village is located 5.6 miles (9.0 km) south-west of Dereham and 9.5 miles (15.3 km) north-west of Norwich, along the A47.

== History ==
East Tuddenham's name is of Anglo-Saxon origin and derives from the Old English for Tuda's homestead or village.

There is evidence to suggest that East Tuddenham was the site of a Roman settlement, with Roman coins, pottery and the remains of a building with a hypocaust.

East Tuddenham is listed in the Domesday Book as a settlement of 32 households in the hundred of Mitford. In 1086, the village was divided between the estates of Alan of Brittany, Hermer de Ferrers, Ralph de Beaufour and William de Warenne.

During the First World War, RAF Mattishall was located in the parish of East Tuddenham and was used as a night-landing airfield for aircraft of No. 51 Squadron RAF, flying interception missions against German Zeppelins.

== Geography ==
According to the 2021 census, East Tuddenham has a population of 516 people which shows a minor decrease from the 517 people recorded in the 2011 census.

The A47, between Birmingham and Lowestoft, runs through the parish as does the River Tud.

== All Saints' Church ==
East Tuddenham's parish church is located on Norwich Road and dates from the Thirteenth Century. The church has been Grade I listed since 1960.

All Saints' was heavily re-modelled in the Fifteenth Century with a font which likely dates from the Twelfth Century. The church also possesses good examples of Twentieth Century stained glass, particularly depictions of Faith, Hope and Charity by Leonard Walker as well as other pieces from workshops in Flanders and a set of royal arms from the reign of King Charles I.

== Notable residents ==
- Lt-Col. William Mellish- (1813-1864) army officer and cricketer, born in East Tuddenham.
- Sir George Mellish- (1814–1877) barrister and judge, born in East Tuddenham.

== Governance ==
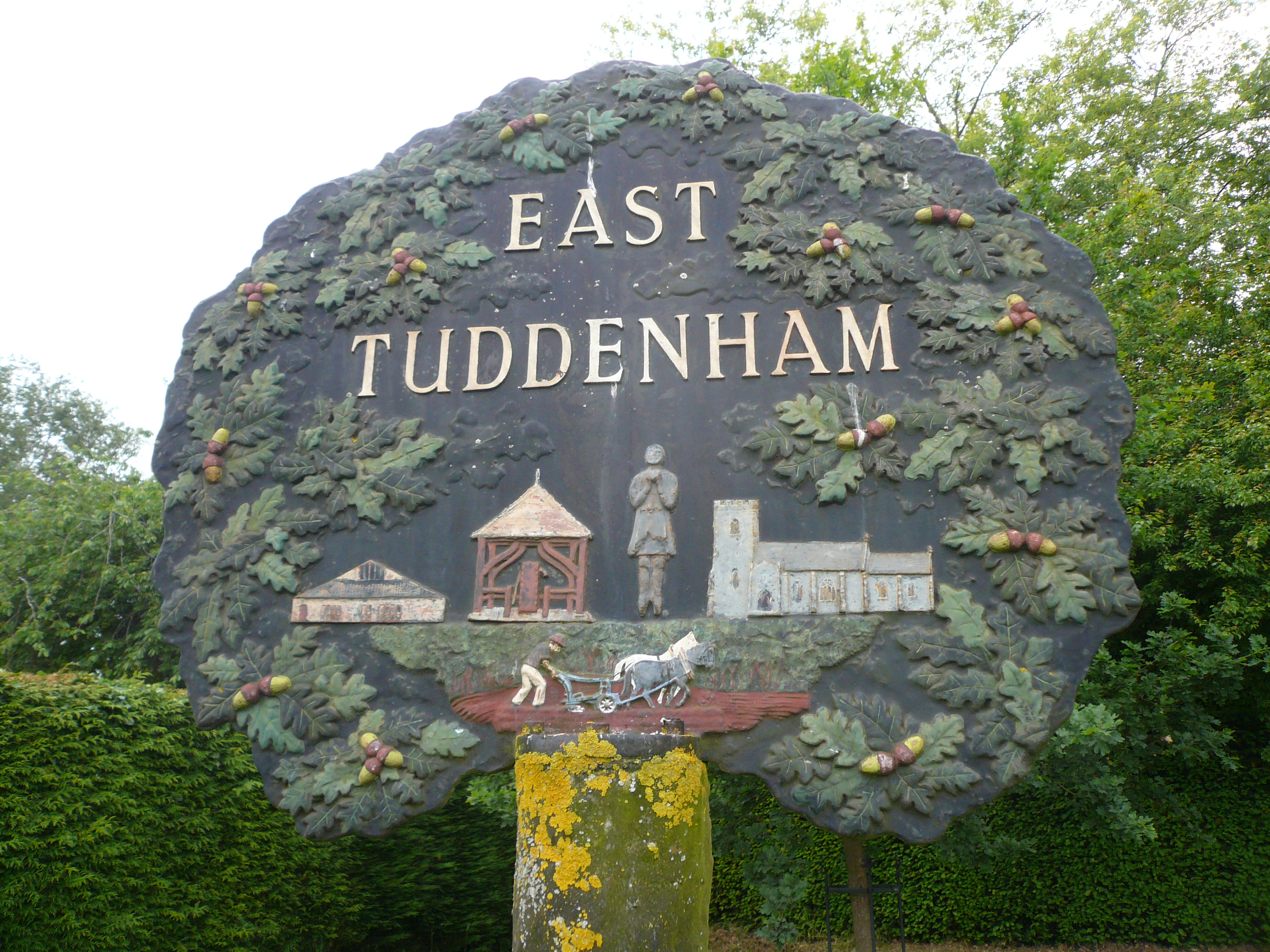
East Tuddenham village sign

East Tuddenham is part of the electoral ward of Mattishall for local elections and is part of the district of Breckland.

The village's national constituency is Mid Norfolk which has been represented by the Conservative's George Freeman MP since 2010.

== War Memorial ==
East Tuddenham's war memorial is a wooden plaque with the names of the fallen carved into it located inside All Saints' Church. The memorial lists the following names for the First World War:

Rank	Name	Unit	Date of death	Burial/Commemoration
Capt.	Arthur E. Beck MC	1/5th Bn., Norfolk Regiment	19 Apr. 1917	Gaza War Cemetery
Sgt.	James J. Turner	2nd Bn., East Yorkshire Regiment	3 Oct. 1915	Bethune Town Cemetery
Cpl.	William D. Arthurton	7th Bn., Border Regiment	6 Apr. 1916	Cite Bonjean Cemetery
Cpl.	George W. Claxton	1st Bn., East Surrey Regiment	8 Nov. 1918	Pont-sur-Sambre Cemetery
Cpl.	John Pinchen	1/5th Bn., Norfolk Regiment	19 Apr. 1917	Jerusalem Memorial
Gnr.	Dennis Bales	2nd (Mortar) Bty., Royal Field Artillery	11 Jun. 1916	Arras Memorial
Gnr.	William Spinks	137th Bty., Royal Garrison Artillery	1 Jan. 1918	Giavera Cemetery
Pte.	William Turner	2nd Bn., Bedfordshire Regiment	23 Oct. 1918	Highland Cemetery
Pte.	Colin G. Pinchen	6th Bn., Bedfordshire Regt.	12 Apr. 1917	Arras Memorial
Pte.	Stanley Turner	35th Bn., Royal Fusiliers	5 Jun. 1917	St. Sever Cemetery
Pte.	William James	1st Bn., Norfolk Regiment	1 May 1915	Bailleul Cemetery
Pte.	George J. Turner	2nd Bn., Norfolk Regt.	2 Oct. 1917	Basra War Cemetery
Pte.	William Thompson	8th Bn., Norfolk Regt.	3 Nov. 1916	Contay Cemetery
Pte.	Reginald F. Buck	9th Bn., Norfolk Regt.	15 Apr. 1918	Tyne Cot
Pte.	Charles Moore	2nd Bn., Queen's Royal Regiment	9 Apr. 1917	Etaples Military Cemetery

And, the following for the Second World War:

Rank	Name	Unit	Date of death	Burial/Commemoration
AS	Frank E. Fennell	H.M.M.T.B No. 697 (Note: HMMTB 697 was sunk in the Adriatic Sea by a mine on 17 April 1945.)	17 Apr. 1945	Belgrade New Cemetery
