= Kilverstone Hall =

Country house in Kilverstone, Norfolk, England

Coordinates: 52.4227°N 0.7813°E

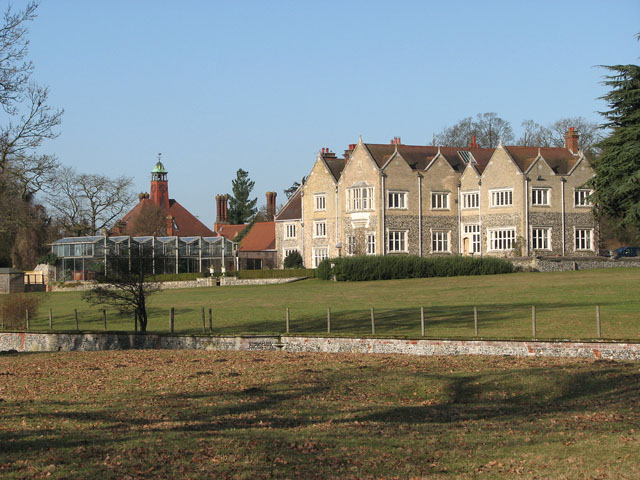
Kilverstone Hall

Kilverstone Hall is a Grade II listed building in Kilverstone in Norfolk, England.

== History ==
Kilverstone Hall is a country house built in the early 17th century which was owned by Thomas Wright and his family. It was greatly enlarged by Josiah Vavasseur, technical director of the arms manufacturing firm William Armstrong Ltd. It included a parkland estate of 3,000 acres (12 km^{2}). Upon Vavasseur's death in 1908 the house and park were inherited by Cecil Fisher, son of Admiral Lord Fisher and adopted heir to Vavasseur. Admiral Fisher and his wife moved into the Hall by invitation of Cecil Fisher upon the Admiral's retirement as First Sea Lord in 1910 and lived there until he was recalled as First Sea Lord upon the outbreak of World War I in 1914. Lord Fisher's grave is in Kilverstone churchyard. The house was remodelled in a Jacobean style in 1913. It still remains the property of the Fisher family and has the mailed fist and trident of Lord Fisher's baronial crest on its gateposts.

The house is listed Grade II on the National Heritage List for England. The Kilverstone Club in the grounds of the house is Grade II listed, as is the water tower, entrance lodge, stable block, and the base of a medieval cross near the hall.
