= John Fisher, 1st Baron Fisher =

Royal Navy officer (1841–1920)

Admiral of the Fleet The Right Honourable The Lord Fisher GCB OM GCVO
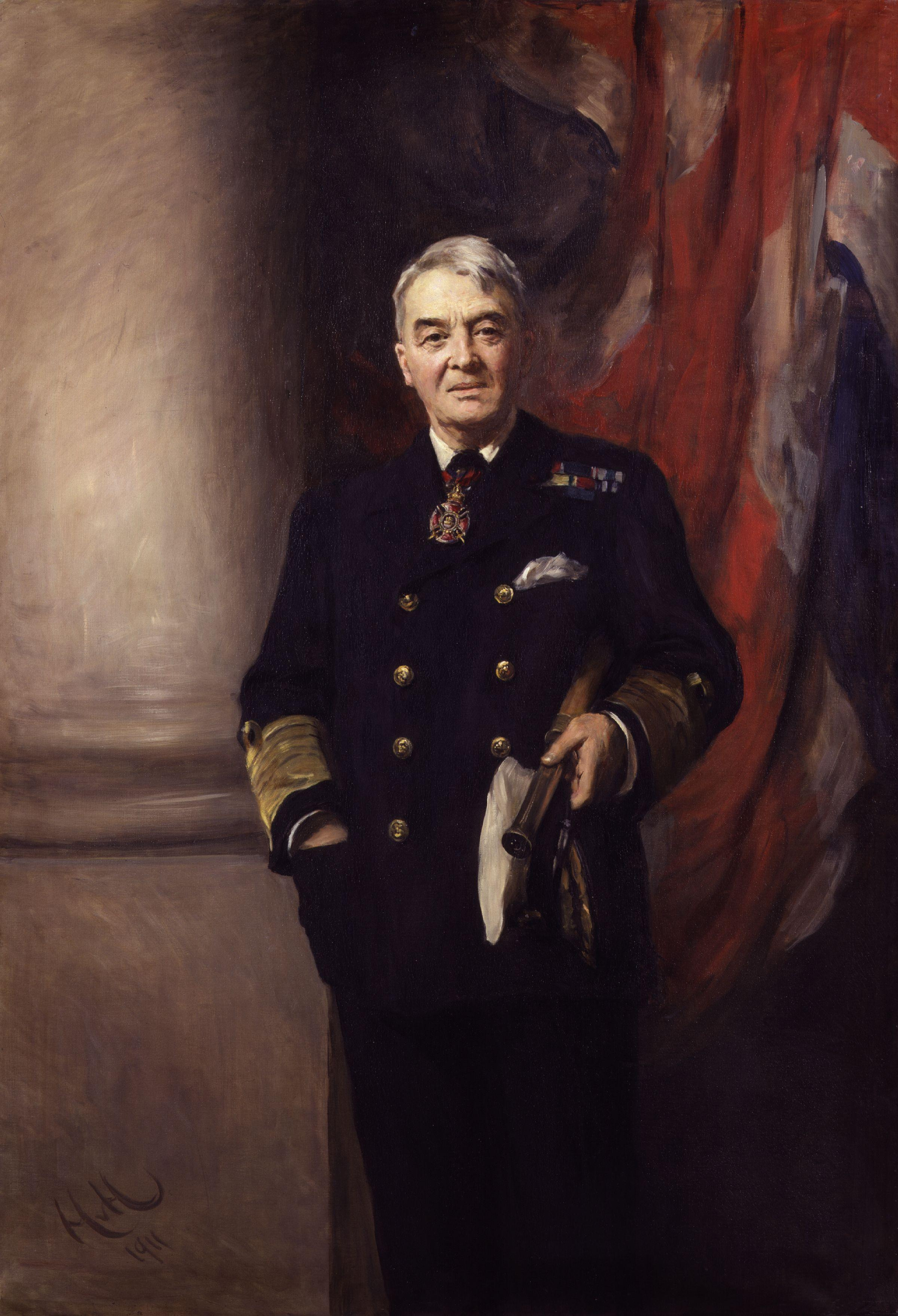
- Portrait of Fisher by Hubert von Herkomer
- Born: 25 January 1841; Ramboda, Ceylon
- Died: 10 July 1920 (aged 79); London, England
- Military career
- Allegiance: United Kingdom
- Branch: Royal Navy
- Service years: 1854–1911; 1914–1915
- Rank: Admiral of the Fleet
- Nickname: Jacky
- Commands: First Sea Lord (1904–1910, 1914–1915); Commander-in-Chief, Portsmouth (1903–1904); Second Naval Lord (1902–1903); Mediterranean Fleet (1899–1902); North America and West Indies Station (1897–1899); Third Naval Lord and Controller (1892–1897); Admiral Superintendent Portsmouth (1891); Director of Naval Ordnance (1886–1891); HMS Excellent (1883–1886); HMS Inflexible (1881–1882); HMS Northampton (1879–1881); HMS Bellerophon (1877–1878); HMS Vernon (1874–1877)
- Conflicts: Crimean War; Second Opium War; Anglo-Egyptian War; First World War
- Awards: Knight Grand Cross of the Order of the Bath; Member of the Order of Merit; Knight Grand Cross of the Royal Victorian Order; Grand Cordon of the Légion d'honneur (France); Grand Cordon of the Order of Osmanieh (Ottoman Empire); Grand Cordon of the Order of the Rising Sun (Japan)

Admiral of the Fleet John Arbuthnot Fisher, 1st Baron Fisher GCB, OM, GCVO (25 January 1841 – 10 July 1920), commonly known as Jacky or Jackie Fisher, was a Royal Navy officer. Fisher was chiefly recognised as an innovator, strategist, and architect of naval reform rather than as an operational admiral, although he held combat commands throughout his career. Appointed First Sea Lord in 1904, Fisher played a critical role in the Anglo-German naval arms race, helping to modernise the British navy ahead of the First World War.

Fisher saw the need to improve the range, accuracy and rate-of-fire of naval gunnery, and became an early proponent of the use of the torpedo, which he believed would supersede big guns for use against ships. As Controller of the Navy, he introduced torpedo-boat destroyers as a class of ship intended for defence against attack from torpedo boats or from submarines. As First Sea Lord he drove the construction of HMS Dreadnought, the first all-big-gun battleship, but he also believed that submarines would become increasingly important and urged their development. He became involved with the introduction of turbine engines to replace reciprocating engines, and with the introduction of oil fuelling to replace coal. He introduced daily baked bread on board ships, whereas when he entered the service it was customary to eat hard biscuits, frequently infested by biscuit beetles.

He first officially retired from the Admiralty in 1910 on his 69th birthday, but became First Sea Lord again in November 1914. He resigned seven months later in frustration over Winston Churchill's Gallipoli campaign, and then served as chairman of the Government's Board of Invention and Research until the end of the war.

== Character and appearance ==
Fisher was five feet seven inches tall and stocky with a round face. In later years, some suggested that Fisher, born in Ceylon of British parents, had Asian ancestry due to his features and the yellow cast of his skin. However, his colour resulted from dysentery and malaria in middle life, which nearly caused his death. He had a fixed and compelling gaze when addressing someone, which gave little clue to his feelings. Fisher was energetic, ambitious, enthusiastic and clever. A shipmate described him as "easily the most interesting midshipman I ever met". When addressing someone he could become carried away with the point he was seeking to make, and on one occasion, King Edward VII asked him to stop shaking his fist in his face. He was considered a "man who demanded to be heard, and one who didn't suffer fools lightly".

Throughout his life he was a religious man and attended church regularly when ashore. He had a passion for sermons and might attend two or three services in a day to hear them, which he would "discuss afterwards with great animation". However, he was discreet in expressing his religious views because he feared public attention might hinder his professional career.

He was not keen on sport, but he was a highly proficient dancer. Fisher employed his dancing skill later in life to charm a number of important ladies. He became interested in dancing in 1877 and insisted that the officers of his ship learn to dance. Fisher cancelled the leave of midshipmen who would not take part. He introduced the practice of junior officers dancing on deck when the band was playing for senior officers' wardroom dinners. This practice spread through the fleet. He broke with the then ball tradition of dancing with a different partner for each dance, instead adopting the scandalous habit of choosing one good dancer as his partner for the evening. His ability to charm all comers of all social classes made up for his sometimes blunt or tactless comments. He suffered from seasickness throughout his life.

Fisher's aim was "efficiency of the fleet and its instant readiness for war", which won him support amongst a certain kind of navy officer. He believed in advancing the most able, rather than the longest serving. This upset those he passed over. Thus, he divided the navy into those who approved of his innovations and those who did not. As he became older and more senior he also became more autocratic and commented, "Anyone who opposes me, I crush". He believed that nations fought wars for material gain, and that maintaining a strong navy deterred other nations from engaging it in battle, thus decreasing the likelihood of war: "On the British fleet rests the British Empire." Fisher also believed that the risk of catastrophe in a sea battle was far greater than on land: a war could be lost or won in a day at sea, with no hope of replacing lost ships, but an army could be rebuilt quickly. When an arms race broke out between Germany and Britain to build larger navies, Kaiser Wilhelm II commented, "I admire Fisher, I say nothing against him. If I were in his place I should do all that he has done and I should do all that I know he has in mind to do".

== Personal life ==
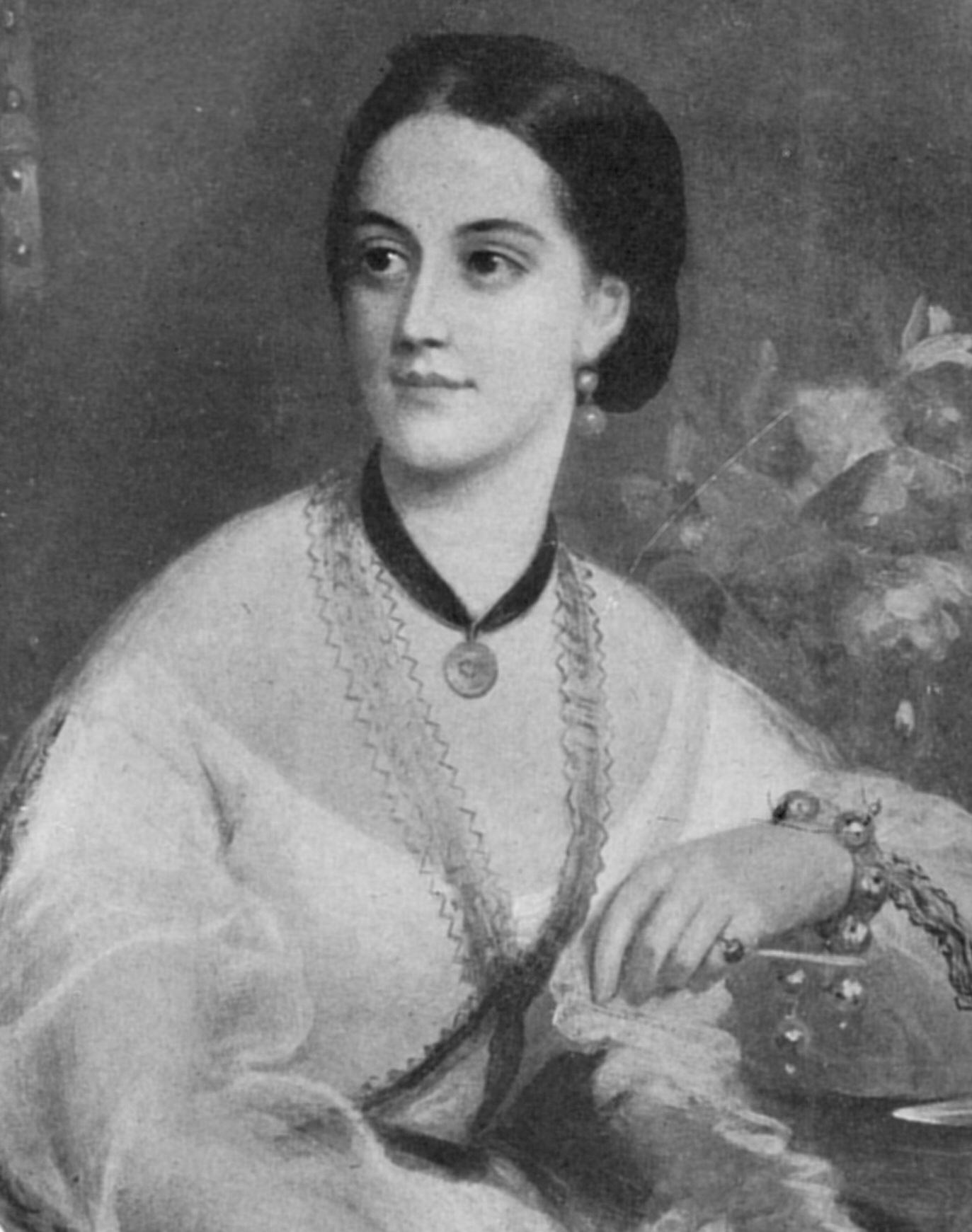
Frances Katharine Josepha Broughton, who married Fisher in 1866

John Arbuthnot Fisher was born on 25 January 1841 on the Wavendon Estate at Ramboda in Ceylon. He was the eldest of eleven children, of whom only seven survived infancy, born to Sophia Fisher and Captain William Fisher, a British Army officer in the 78th Highlanders, who had been an aide-de-camp to the former governor of Ceylon, Sir Robert Wilmot-Horton, and was serving as a staff officer at Kandy. Sophia's father Alfred Lambe was a wine merchant and Purveyor of Mineral Water to the King. She was brought up New Bond Street in Mayfair, London. Fisher commented, "My mother was a most magnificent and handsome, extremely young woman....My father was 6 feet 2 inches..., also especially handsome. Why I am ugly is one of those puzzles of physiology which are beyond finding out".

William Fisher sold his commission the year John was born, and became a coffee planter and later chief superintendent of police. He incurred such debt on his two coffee plantations that he could barely support his growing family. At the age of six John (who was always known within the family as "Jack") was sent to England to live with his maternal grandfather, Alfred Lambe, in London. His grandfather had also lost money and the family survived by renting out rooms in their home. John's younger brother, Frederic William Fisher, joined the Royal Navy and reached the rank of admiral, and his youngest surviving sibling Philip became a navy lieutenant on HMS Atalanta before drowning in an 1880 storm.

William Fisher was killed in a riding accident on 5 May 1866 when John was 25. John's relationship with his mother Sophia suffered from their separation. However, he continued to send her an allowance until her death. In 1870, when Sophia suggested a visit, Fisher dissuaded her as strongly as he could. Fisher wrote to his wife: "I heard from my mother... She contemplates coming to see me... I am in a horrid fright of my mother turning up some day unexpectedly; I am sure we couldn't live together. I hate the very thought of it and really, I don't want to see her. I don't see why I should as I haven't the slightest recollection of her."

Fisher married Frances Katharine Josepha Broughton, known as "Kitty", the daughter of the Rev. Thomas Delves Broughton and Frances Corkran, on 4 April 1866 while stationed at Portsmouth. Kitty's two brothers were both naval officers. According to a cousin, she believed that Jack would rise "to the top of the tree." They remained married until her death in July 1918. They had a son, Cecil Vavasseur, 2nd Baron Fisher (1868–1955), and three daughters, Beatrix Alice (1867–1930), Dorothy Sybil (1873–1962), and Pamela Mary (1876–1949), all of whom married naval officers who went on to become admirals: Beatrix Alice married Reginald Rundell Neeld in 1896; Pamela Mary married Henry Blackett in 1906; and Dorothy Sybil married Eric Fullerton in 1908.

== Early career (1854–1869) ==
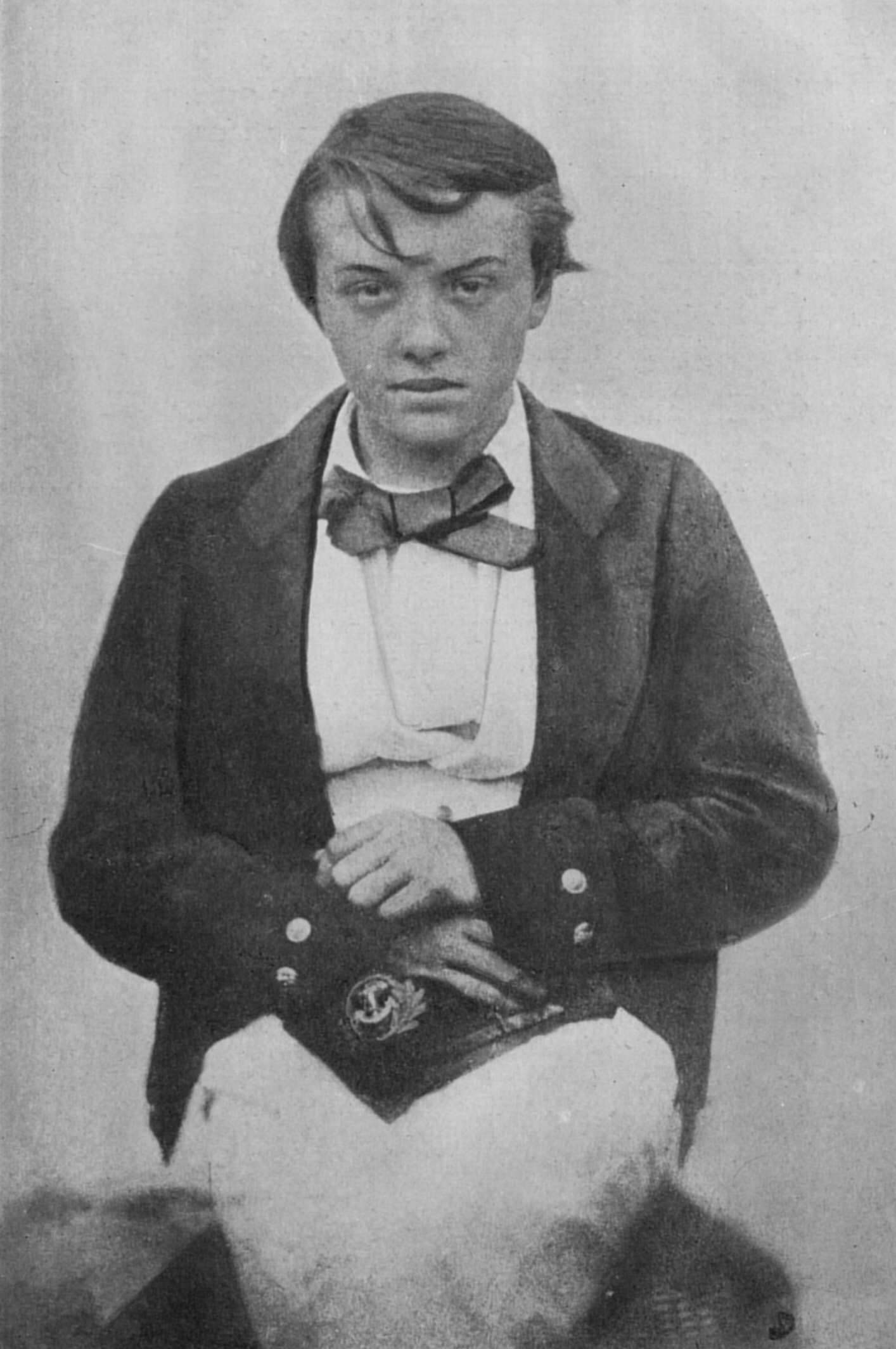
Fisher as Midshipman 1856–1860

Fisher's father ultimately aided his entry into the navy, via his godmother Lady Anne Wilmot-Horton, widow of the governor of Ceylon to whom William Fisher had been Aide-de-camp. She prevailed upon a neighbour, Admiral Sir William Parker (the last of Nelson's captains), to nominate John as a naval cadet. The entry examination consisted of writing out the Lord's Prayer and jumping naked over a chair. He formally entered the Royal Navy on 13 July 1854, aged 13, on board Nelson's former flagship, Victory, at Portsmouth. On 29 July he joined HMS Calcutta, an old ship of the line. She was built of wood, in 1831, with 84 smooth-bore muzzle-loading guns arranged on two gun decks, and relied entirely on sail for propulsion. She had a crew of 700, and discipline was strictly enforced by the "hard-bitten Captain Robert Stopford". Fisher fainted when he witnessed eight men being flogged on his first day.

Calcutta participated in the blockade of Russian ports in the Gulf of Finland during the Crimean War, entitling Fisher to the Baltic Medal, before returning to Britain a few months later. The crew was paid off on 1 March 1856.

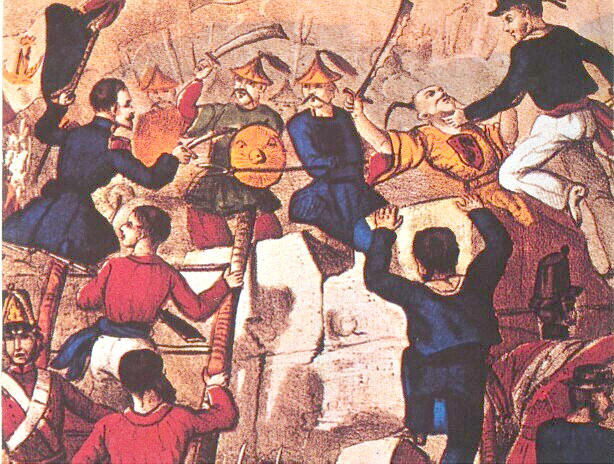
Combat at Canton (Guangzhou) during the Second Opium War

On 2 March 1856, Fisher was posted to HMS Agamemnon, and was sent to Constantinople (now Istanbul) to join her. He arrived on 19 May, just as the war was ending. After a tour around the Dardanelles picking up troops and baggage, Agamemnon returned to England, where the crew was paid off.

Promotion to midshipman came on 12 July 1856 and Fisher joined a 21-gun steam corvette, HMS Highflyer, part of the China Station. He was to spend the next five years in Chinese waters, seeing action in the Second Opium War, 1856–1860. The Highflyer's captain, Charles Shadwell, was an expert on naval astronomy (subsequently being appointed a Fellow of the Royal Society in 1861) and he taught Fisher much about navigation, with spectacular later results. When Shadwell was replaced as captain following an injury in action, he gave Fisher a pair of studs engraved with his family motto "Loyal au Mort", which Fisher was to use for the rest of his life.

Fisher passed the seamanship examination for the rank of lieutenant, and was given the acting rank of mate, on his nineteenth birthday, 25 January 1860. He was transferred three months later from the steam frigate Chesapeake to the screw corvette Pearl as an acting lieutenant. Shortly afterwards, Fisher had his first brief command: taking the yacht of the China Squadron's admiral—the paddle-gunboat HMS Coromandel—from Hong Kong to Canton (presently Guangzhou), a voyage of four days.

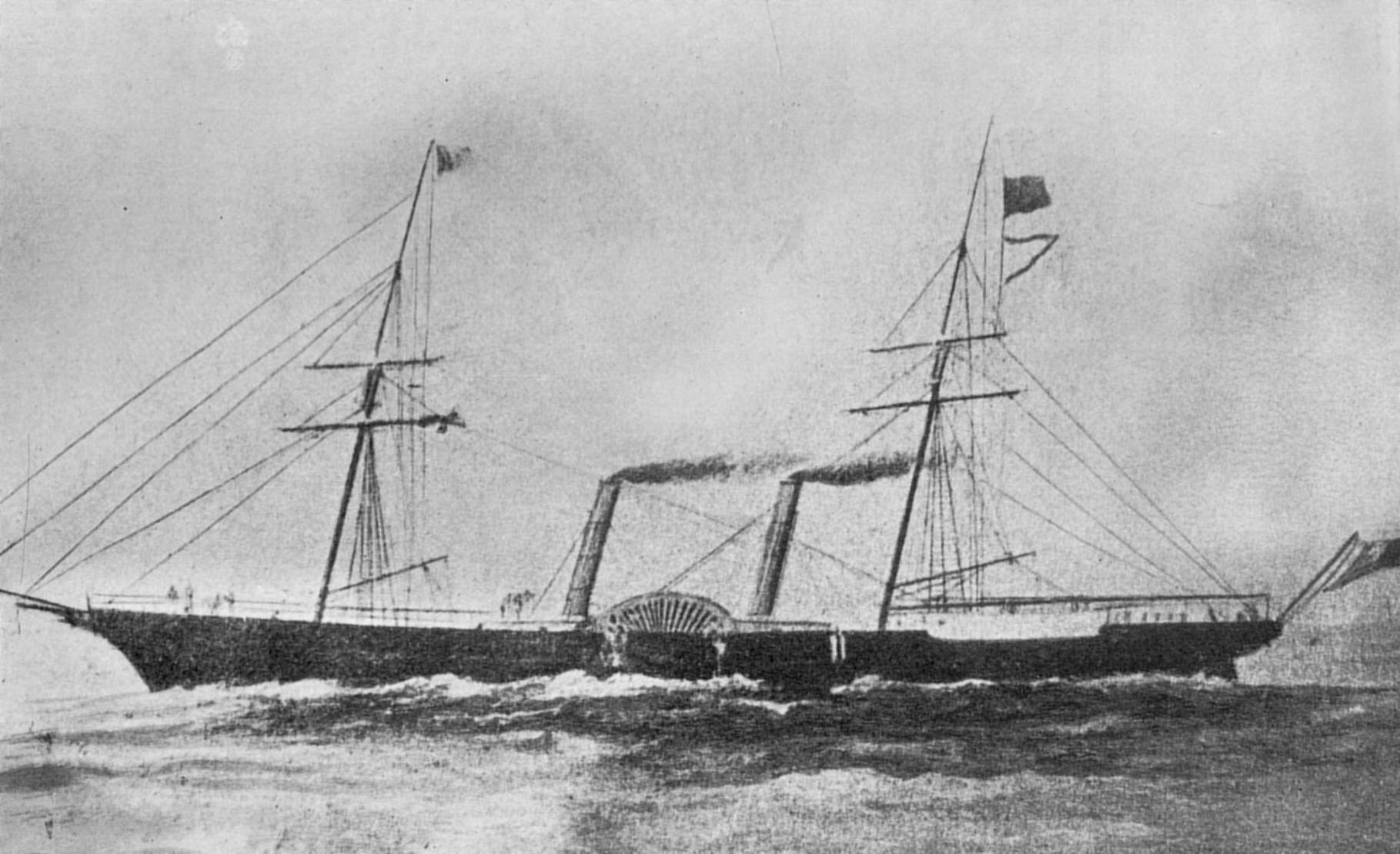
First command, HMS Coromandel

He was transferred, on 12 June 1860, to the paddle-sloop HMS Furious where he saw sufficient action to add the Taku Forts and Canton clasps to his China War Medal. Furious left Hong Kong and the China Station in March 1861 and, after a leisurely voyage home, paid off her crew in Portsmouth on 30 August. Captain Oliver Jones of the Furious was entirely different from Shadwell: Fisher wrote there was a mutiny on board within his first fortnight, that Jones terrorized his crew and disobeyed orders given to him. For his part, by the end of the tour, Jones was impressed by Fisher.

In November 1861, Fisher sat his final lieutenant's examination in navigation at the Royal Naval College at Portsmouth, passing with flying colours. He had already received top grades in seamanship and gunnery, and achieved the highest score then attained under the recently introduced five-yearly scheme, with 963 out of 1,000 marks in navigation. For this, he was awarded the Beaufort Testimonial, an annual prize of books and instruments; but in the meantime he had to wait around, unpaid, until his appointment came through officially.

From January 1862 to March 1863, Fisher returned to the payroll at the navy's principal gunnery school aboard HMS Excellent, a three-decker moored in Portsmouth harbour. During this time, Excellent was evaluating the performance of the "revolutionary" Armstrong breech-loading guns against the conventional Whitworth muzzle-loading type. During free afternoons Fisher would walk the downs, shouting to practise his command voice. He spent 15 of the next 25 years in four tours of duty at Portsmouth concerned with development of gunnery and torpedoes.

In March 1863, Fisher was appointed Gunnery Lieutenant to HMS Warrior, the first all-iron seagoing armoured battleship and the most powerful ship in the fleet. Built in 1859, she marked the beginning of the end of the Age of Sail and, coincidentally, was armed with both Armstrong guns (breech-loading) and Whitworth guns (muzzle-loading). Fisher noted he was popular amongst his brother officers because he frequently stayed on board when others went ashore and could take duty for them.

Fisher returned to Excellent in 1864 as a gunnery instructor, where he remained until 1869. Towards the end of his posting he became interested in torpedoes, which were invented in the 1860s, and championed their cause as a relatively simple weapon capable of sinking a battleship. His expertise with torpedoes led to his being invited to Germany in June 1869 for the founding ceremony of a new naval base at Wilhelmshaven, where he met King William I of Prussia (soon to become German Emperor), Otto von Bismarck and Helmuth von Moltke the Elder. Perhaps inspired by the visit, he started preparing a paper on the design, construction and management of electrical torpedoes, the cutting-edge technology of the time.

== Commander (1869–1876) ==
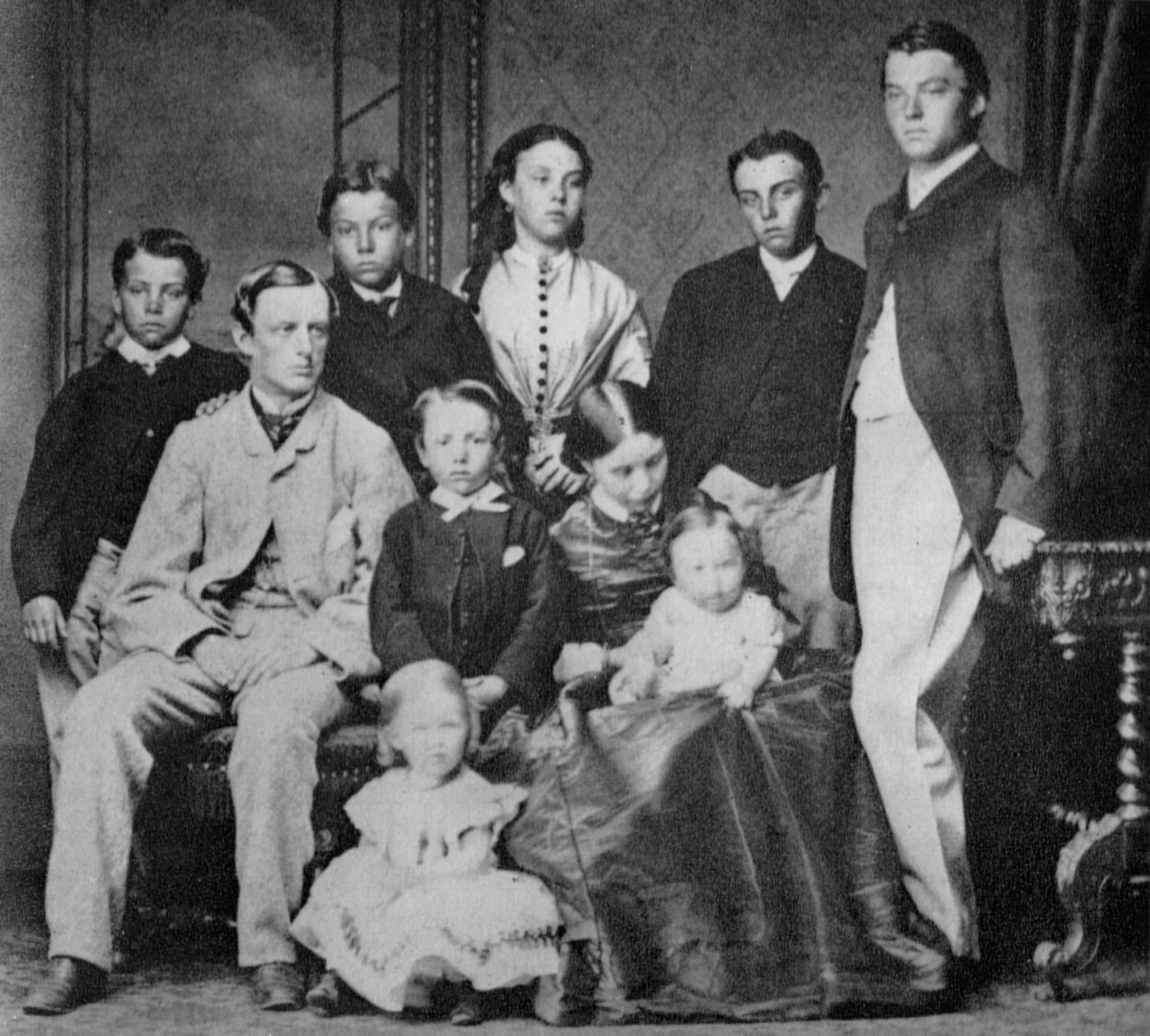
Fisher (right) in 1865 with siblings (rear left to right) Frederic, Frank, Lucy, Arthur. Seated Lindsey Daniell, Philip, sister Alice (Mrs Daniell). Frederic also became an admiral, while Philip drowned as a lieutenant when Atalanta was lost in a storm.

On 2 August 1869 Fisher was promoted to the rank of commander, "at the early age of twenty-eight" according to biographer Ruddock Mackay. On 8 November, he was posted as second-in-command of HMS Donegal, serving under Captain William Hewett, a Crimean War Victoria Cross holder. Donegal was a Conqueror-class ship of the line, with auxiliary screw propulsion. She plied between Portsmouth and Hong Kong, taking out relief crews and bringing home the crews they replaced. During this time he completed his torpedoes treatise.

In May 1870, Fisher transferred, again as second in command, to HMS Ocean, flagship of the China Station. It was whilst he was on Ocean that he wrote an eight-page memoir: "Naval Tactics", which Captain James Graham Goodenough had printed for private circulation. He installed a system of electrical firing so that all guns could be fired simultaneously, making Ocean the first vessel to be so equipped. Fisher noted in his letters that he greatly missed his wife, but also missed his work on torpedoes and the access to important people possible with a posting in England.

In 1872, he returned to England to the gunnery school Excellent, this time as head of torpedo and mine training, during which time he split the Torpedo Branch off from Excellent, forming a separate establishment for it called HMS Vernon. His duties included lecturing, and negotiating the purchase of the navy's first Whitehead torpedo. In order to promote the school, he invited politicians and journalists to attend lectures and organised demonstrations. This produced mixed reactions amongst some officers, who did not approve of his showmanship. He was promoted to captain on 30 October 1874, aged thirty-three, in time to be Vernon's first commander. Vernon consisted of the hulk of HMS Vernon, William Symonds' 1832 50-gun sailing frigate, and the hulk of the 26-gun steam frigate Ariadne provided accommodation. HMS Vesuvius, a torpedo boat of 245 tons, was Vernon's experimental tender for the conduct of torpedo trials. They were moored in Portsmouth Harbour. In 1876, Fisher served on the Board of Admiralty's torpedo committee.

== Captain R.N. (1876–1883) ==
- September 1876 – March 1877: On half-pay with his family.
- 30 January 1877 – 1 March 1877: Commanding HMS Hercules.

Fisher was appointed to command HMS Bellerophon as flag captain to the Admiral of the North America and West Indies Station, Astley Cooper Key, from 2 March 1877 to 4 June 1878. Bellerophon had been in the dockyard for repairs, so the new crew was less than perfect in carrying out their duties. Fisher told them I intend to give you hell for three months, and if you have not come up to my standard in that time you'll have hell for another three months. Midshipman (later Admiral) Gordon Moore recalled, Fisher was a very exacting master and I had at times long and arduous duties, long hours at the engine room telegraphs in cold fog, etc., and the least inattention was punished. It was, I think, his way of proving us, for he always rewarded us in some way when an extra hard bit of work was over.

Cooper Key was transferred to a special squadron operating in the Channel formed to combat fears of war with Russia. Fisher went with him as flag captain of HMS Hercules from 7 June to 21 August 1878. From 22 August to 12 September he transferred still as flag captain under Cooper Key to HMS Valorous. At this time Fisher first became a proponent of the new compass being designed by Sir William Thomson which incorporated corrections for the deviation caused by the metal in iron ships.

From 9 January to 24 July 1879 Fisher commanded the wooden-hulled HMS Pallas serving in the Mediterranean Command under Geoffrey Hornby. Pallas was in poor condition, having a chain passed around the ship to hold the armour plates in place. The tour included an official visit to Constantinople where Fisher dined with Sultan Abdul Hamid II of the Ottoman Empire from gold cups and plates. He then returned to the UK for two months leave at half pay, visiting Bruges with his family.

His next posting, starting 25 September 1879, was to HMS Northampton as Flag Captain to Sir Leopold McClintock, commanding the North American squadron. Northampton was a new ship with a number of innovations, including twin screws, searchlights and telephones, as well as being armed with torpedoes. It was fitted with an experimental Thomson-designed compass, which the inventor was on hand to adjust. Three days were spent attempting and failing to adjust it, with Thomson becoming increasingly bad tempered, until it was noticed that by accident the degree card had been marked with only 359 instead of 360 degrees. The ship was fitted with a new design of signalling lamp created by Captain Philip Colomb, who came on board to inspect them. As a joke, Fisher arranged for anything that could go wrong with the lamps to do so, sending Colomb away disheartened over his invention (although Fisher officially reported favourably about the lamps). On another occasion, the naval hospital at Halifax requested some flags to fly for the Queen's birthday. Fisher obliged, but sent only yellow and black flags signifying plague and quarantine. On the other hand, he worked hard at improving his ship. As reported by his second in command, Commander Wilmot Fawkes, the ship carried out 150 runs with torpedoes in a fortnight, whereas the whole rest of the navy performed only 200 in a year.

Fisher's brother Philip was serving on the training ship Atalanta, which disappeared somewhere between the West Indies and England, believed lost in a storm. Northampton was one of the ships sent to search for her, but without result. In January 1881 Fisher received news of his appointment to the new ironclad battleship HMS Inflexible. Admiral McClintock commented, Everyone regrets the departure of Captain Fisher, but I fancy we shall not fully realize our loss until he is gone....Since his nomination to the Inflexible, his spirits have returned and daily increased, and now he almost requires wiring down. The ship was still being built, so Fisher was temporarily appointed to HMS Duke of Wellington, flagship of the port admiral at Portsmouth between 30 January and 4 July 1881.

=== HMS Inflexible ===
Fisher was considered sufficiently able, with recommendations following all of his postings, to be appointed captain of the newly completed battleship HMS Inflexible. Inflexible had the largest guns and thickest armour of any ship in the navy, but still carried masts and sails and had slow, muzzle-loading guns. She had been seven years under construction and had many innovations built into her, including electric lighting and torpedo tubes, but with such a tortuous layout that crew became lost. The sails were never used for propulsion, but because a ship's performance was partly judged on the speed with which a ship could set sails, Fisher was obliged to drill the crew in their use.

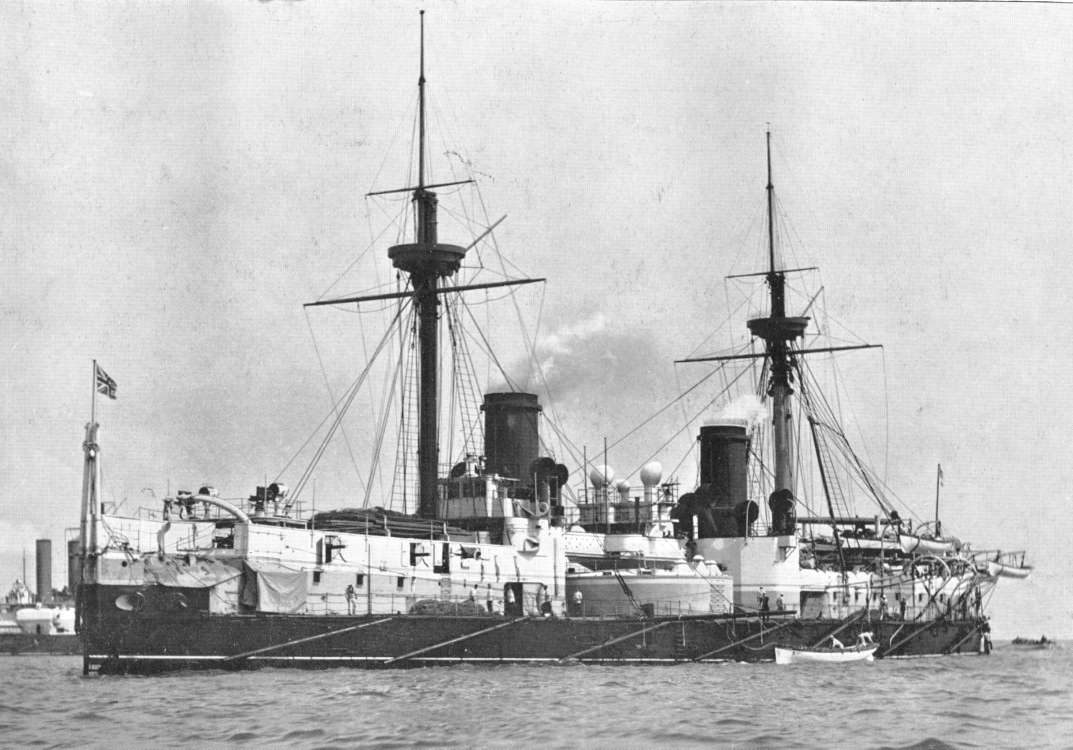
The battleship HMS Inflexible (after original full sailing masts were removed in 1885).

In spring 1882 Inflexible was part of the Mediterranean Fleet and was assigned to protection of Queen Victoria during a visit to Menton on the Riviera. This was intended as a reminder of British naval prowess to the French, but allowed Fisher to meet Victoria and her grandson, Prince Henry of Prussia, who later became admiral of the Imperial German Navy. Victoria was impressed by Fisher, as she had been by his brother Philip who had served on royal yachts and for whom she had arranged the ill-fated posting to Atalanta.

Inflexible took part in the 1882 Anglo-Egyptian War, bombarding the port of Alexandria as part of Admiral Frederick Seymour's fleet. Fisher was placed in charge of a landing party which was quartered in the Ras El Tin Palace. Lacking means of reconnaissance, he devised a plan to armour a train with iron plates, machine gun and cannon. This became celebrated and widely reported by correspondents, so that its inventor, Fisher, came to the attention of the public for the first time as a hero. Shore duty had the unfortunate effect that Fisher became seriously ill with dysentery and malaria. He refused to take sick leave, but eventually was ordered home by Lord Northbrook, who commented, "the Admiralty could build another Inflexible, but not another Fisher".

During this time he became a close friend of the future King Edward VII and Queen Alexandra. He was appointed a Companion of the Bath (CB) in 1882.

=== Home postings ===
From January to April 1883, Fisher was on half pay recovering from his illness. In January, he was invited to visit Osborne House for a fortnight by Queen Victoria, concerned about the charming Captain Fisher. Fisher, having entered the navy penniless and unknown, was delighted.

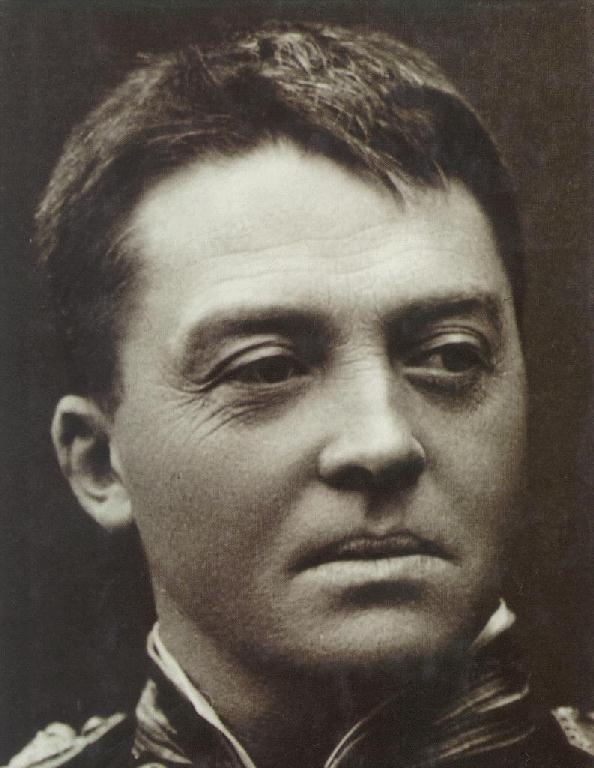
Captain Fisher, 1883

In April 1883, Fisher had recovered sufficiently to return to duty and was appointed commander of HMS Excellent. He remained with Excellent for two years until June 1885, where he gained a following of officers concerned with the poor offensive capabilities of the fleet, including John Jellicoe and Percy Scott. For the next 15 months he had no naval command and still suffered the effects of his illness. He took to visiting Marienbad, which was famous amongst notable society for its restoring climate, and went there regularly in later years.

During June–July 1885, Fisher served a short posting to HMS Minotaur in the Baltic under Admiral Hornby, following the Panjdeh Incident, which led to fear of war with Russia.

From November 1886 to 1890, he was Director of Naval Ordnance, responsible for weapons and munitions. He was responsible for the development of quick-firing guns to be used against the growing threat from torpedo boats, and particularly claimed responsibility for removing wooden boarding pikes from navy ships. The Navy did not have responsibility for manufacture and supply of weapons and ammunition, which was in the hands of the War Office. Fisher began a long campaign to return this responsibility to the Admiralty, but did not finally succeed until he later became First Sea Lord. He was appointed Aide-de-Camp to the Queen in 1887, and promoted Rear-Admiral in August 1890.

== Admiral (1890–1902) ==
From May 1891 to February 1892, Fisher was Admiral Superintendent of the dockyard at Portsmouth, where he concerned himself with improving the speed of operations. Royal Sovereign was built in two years rather than three, while changing a barbette gun on a ship was reduced from a two-day operation to two hours. His example obliged all shipyards, both navy and private, to reduce the time they took to complete a ship, making savings in cost and allowing new designs to enter service more rapidly. He used all the tricks he could devise: an official who refused to step outside his office to personally supervise the work was offered a promotion to the tropics; he would find out the name of one or two men amongst a work crew and then make a point of complimenting them on their work and using their names, giving the impression he knew everyone personally; he took a chair and table into the yard where some operation was to be carried out and declared his intention to stay there until the operation was completed. He observed, When you are told a thing is impossible, that there are insuperable objections, then is the time to fight like the devil.

His next appointment was Third Naval Lord and Controller of the Navy, the naval officer with overall responsibility for provision of ships and equipment. He presided over the development of torpedo boat destroyers armed with quick-firing small-calibre guns (called destroyers at Fisher's suggestion). A suggestion for the boats was brought to the Admiralty in 1892 by Alfred Yarrow of shipbuilders Thornycroft and Yarrow, who reported that he had obtained plans of new torpedo boats being built by the French, and he could build a faster boat to defend against them. Torpedo boats had become a major threat, as they were cheap but potentially able to sink the largest battleships, and France had built large numbers of them. The first destroyers were considered a success and more were ordered, but Fisher immediately ran into trouble by insisting that all shipbuilders, not just Yarrow's, should be invited to build boats to Yarrow's design. A similar (though opposite) difficulty with vested interests arose over the introduction of water tube boilers into navy ships, which held out the promise of improved fuel efficiency and greater speed. The first examples were used by Thornycroft and Yarrow in 1892, and then were trialled in the gunboat Sharpshooter. However, an attempt to specify similar boilers for new cruisers in 1894 led to questions in the House of Commons, and opposition from shipbuilders who did not want to invest in the new technology. The matter continued for several years after Fisher moved on to a new posting, with a parliamentary enquiry rejecting the new boilers. Eventually the new design was adopted, but only after another eighteen ships had been built using the older design, with consequent poorer performance than necessary. Fisher was knighted in the Queen's 1894 Birthday Honours as a Knight Commander of the Bath, promoted to vice-admiral in 1896, and put in charge of the North America and West Indies Station in 1897. In 1898 the Fashoda Crisis brought the threat of war with France, to which Fisher responded with plans to raid the French West Indies including Devil's Island prison, and return the "infamous" Alfred Dreyfus to France to foment trouble within the French army. It was Fisher's policy to conduct all manoeuvres at full speed while training the fleet, and to expect the best from his crews. He would socialise with junior officers so that they were not afraid to approach him with ideas, or disagree with him when the occasion demanded.

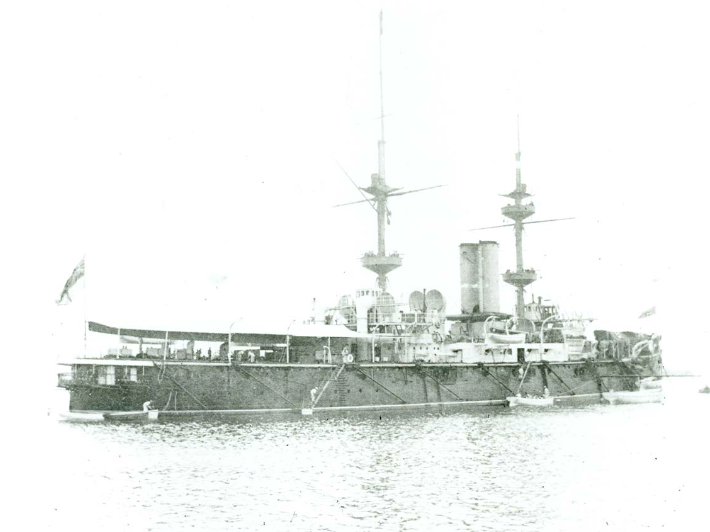
HMS Renown under the command of Fisher, Halifax, Nova Scotia, 1898

Fisher was chosen by Prime Minister Lord Salisbury as British naval delegate to the First Hague Peace Convention in 1899. The peace conference had been called by Russia to agree to limits on armaments, but the British position was to reject any proposal which might restrict use of the navy. Fisher's style was to say little in formal meetings, but to lobby determinedly at all informal gatherings. He impressed many by his affability and style, combined with a serious determination to press the British case with everyone he met. The conference ended successfully with limitations only upon dumdum bullets, poison gas and bombings from balloons, and Fisher was rewarded with appointment as Commander-in-Chief of the Mediterranean Fleet, "the tip-top appointment of the fleet" . The German delegation summarised Britain's position: English world position depended upon the navy, the navy was sufficiently powerful to overcome any combination of states, and England reserved the right to employ that fleet any way it chose.

=== Mediterranean Fleet ===
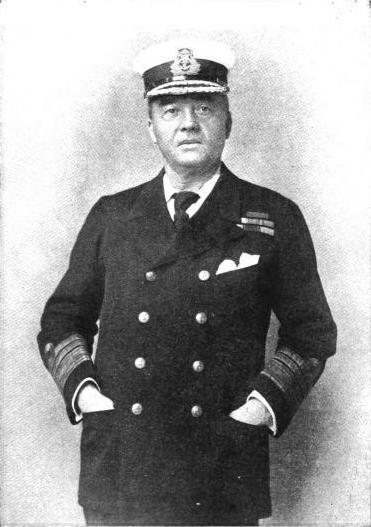
Fisher as commander of the Mediterranean Fleet 1901

Unlike the North America and West Indies station, the Mediterranean Fleet was a vital British command operating from Alexandria and Gibraltar. The important shipping route between India and Britain passed through the Suez Canal, and was considered threatened by France. France was concerned with the route north–south to its colonies in Northern Africa. Fisher retained his flagship from the North American Squadron, HMS Renown, rather than choosing a more powerful but slower traditional battleship, despite criticism from other officers.

His strategy emphasised the importance of striking the first blow, but with an awareness that sunk ships could not easily be replaced, and would replace any officer who could not keep up with the standards he demanded. He gave lectures on naval strategy to which all officers were invited and once again encouraged his officers to bring ideas to him. He offered prizes for essays on tactics and maintained a large tabletop map room with models of all ships in the fleet, where all officers could come to develop tactics. A particular concern was the threat of torpedoes, which Germany had boasted would dispose of the British fleet, and the numerous French torpedo boats. Fisher's innovations were not universally approved, with some senior officers resenting the attention he paid to their juniors, or the pressure he placed on all to improve efficiency.

A programme of realistic exercises was adopted including simulated French raids, defensive manoeuvres, night attacks and blockades, all carried out at maximum speed. He introduced a gold cup for the ship which performed best at gunnery, and insisted upon shooting at greater range and from battle formations. He found that he too was learning some of the complications and difficulties of controlling a large fleet in complex situations, and immensely enjoyed it.

Notes from his lectures indicate that, at the start of his time in the Mediterranean, useful working ranges for heavy guns without telescopic sights were considered to be only 2000 yards, or 3000–4000 yards with such sights, whereas by the end of his time discussion centred on how to shoot effectively at 5000 yards. This was driven by the increasing range of the torpedo, which had now risen to 3000–4000 yards, necessitating ships fighting effectively at greater ranges. At this time he advocated relatively small main armaments on capital ships (some had 15 inch or greater), because the improved technical design of the relatively small (10 inch) modern guns allowed a much greater firing rate and greater overall weight of broadside. The potentially much greater ranges of large guns was not an issue, because no one knew how to aim them effectively at such ranges. He argued that "the design of fighting ships must follow the mode of fighting instead of fighting being subsidiary to and dependent on the design of ships." As regards how officers needed to behave, he commented, "Think and act for yourself is the motto for the future, not Let us wait for orders."

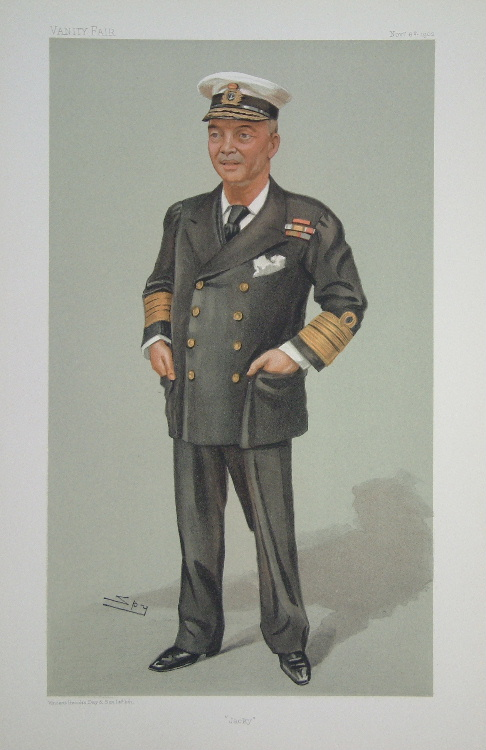
Fisher's caricature by 'Spy' (Leslie Ward) published in Vanity Fair 1902. The magazine printed a cartoon of a topical figure each week.

Maurice Hankey, then a marine officer serving under Fisher, later commented, "It is difficult for anyone who had not lived under the previous regime to realize what a change Fisher brought about in the Mediterranean fleet. ... Before his arrival, the topics and arguments of the officers messes ... were mainly confined to such matters as the cleaning of paint and brasswork. ... These were forgotten and replaced by incessant controversies on tactics, strategy, gunnery, torpedo warfare, blockade, etc. It was a veritable renaissance and affected every officer in the navy." Lord Charles Beresford, later to become a severe critic of Fisher, gave up a plan to return to Britain and enter parliament, because he had "learnt more in the last week than in the last forty years."

Fisher implemented a program of banquets and balls for important dignitaries to improve diplomatic relations. The fleet visited Constantinople, where he had three meetings with the sultan and was awarded the Grand Cordon, Order of Osmanieh in November 1900, and the following year he was promoted to full Admiral on 5 November 1901. He lobbied hard with the Admiralty to obtain additional ships and supplies for the Mediterranean squadron. Beresford, who had established a career in politics alongside his naval one, continued a public campaign for greater funding of the fleet, which caused him to come into conflict with the Admiralty. While Fisher agreed with him as to the need for greater funding and instant readiness for war, he chose to stay out of the public debate. However, he maintained a steady confidential correspondence with the journalist Arnold White, providing him with information and advice for a newspaper campaign promoting the needs of the navy. During the course of the correspondence in 1902, Fisher noted that although France was Britain's historical enemy, Britain had considerable common interest with France as a possible ally, whereas growing German activity abroad made her a much more likely enemy.

The correspondence revealed that Fisher remained uncertain how his views were being received at the Admiralty and an uncertainty on his part whether he would receive further promotions. He had already received approaches to become a director of Armstrong Whitworth, of Elswick (then Britain's largest armaments firm), at a considerably larger salary than that of an admiral and with the possibility of building privately new designs of ship which he believed would be needed to maintain the strength of the fleet.

== Second Sea Lord: reform of officer training (1902–1904) ==
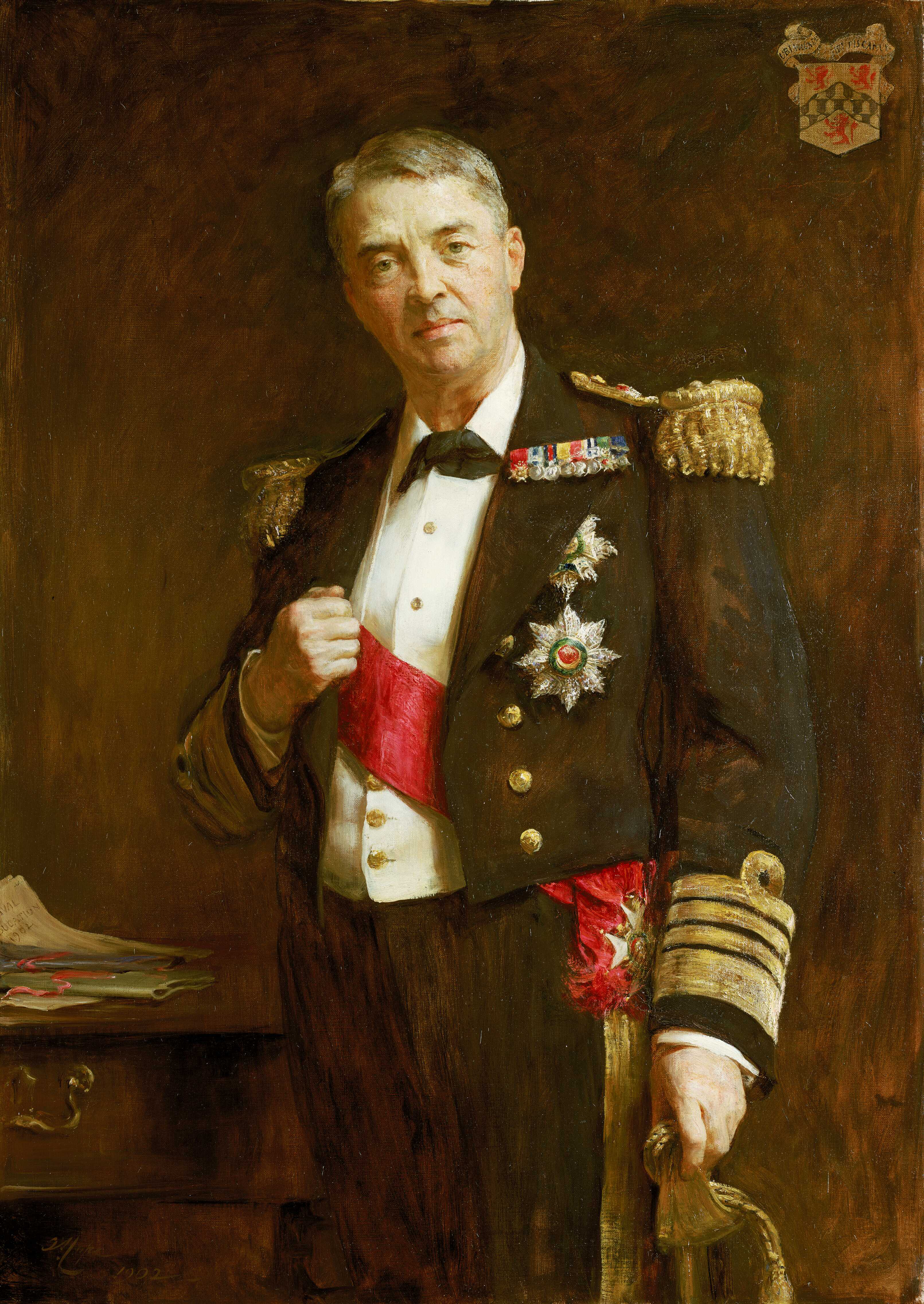
Admiral Sir John Fisher GCB in 1902

In early June 1902 Fisher handed over the command of the Mediterranean Squadron to Admiral Sir Compton Domvile, and returned to the UK to take up the appointment as Second Naval Lord in charge of personnel. He was read in at the Admiralty on 9 June, and took up his duties the following day.

At this time engineering officers, who had become increasingly important in the fleet as it became steadily more dependent upon machinery, were still largely looked down upon by executive (command) officers. Fisher considered it would be better for the navy if the two branches could be merged, as had been done in the past with navigation officers who had similarly once been a completely separate speciality. His solution was to merge the cadet training of ordinary and engineer officers and revise the curriculum so that it provided a suitable grounding to later go on to either path. The proposal was initially resisted by the remainder of the Board of Admiralty, but Fisher convinced them of the benefits of the changes. Objections within the navy as a whole were harder to quell and a campaign once again broke out in newspapers. Fisher was thoroughly aware of the benefits of getting the press on his side and continued to leak information to friendly journalists. Beresford was approached by officers objecting to the changes to act as champion of their cause, but sided with Fisher on this issue.

Training was extended from under two years to four, with the resulting need for more accommodation for cadets. A second cadet establishment, the Royal Naval College, Osborne, was constructed at Osborne House on the Isle of Wight for the first two years of training, with the last two remaining at the Britannia Royal Naval College, Dartmouth. All cadets now received an education in science and technology as it related to life on board a ship as well as navigation and seamanship. Those who went on to be command officers would now have the benefit of improved understanding of their ships while those who became engineers would be better equipped for command. Physical education and sport were to be taught, not only for the benefit of the cadets but also for the future training of ships' crews which were expected to produce sporting teams on good-will visits in foreign ports. Entrance by examination, which biased the intake to those who could obtain special tuition, was replaced with an interview committee tasked with determining the general knowledge of candidates and their reaction to the questions as much as their answers. After the four years, cadets were posted to special training ships for final practical experience before being posted to real command positions. The results of the final examination affected the seniority allotted to each cadet and his chance of future early promotion.

Fisher had described his Selborne-Fisher scheme as "unstoppable by prejudice, Parliament, Satan or even, beyond all these, the Treasury itself". However his original inclusion of the Royal Marines caused a drastic fall in the number of cadets opting to become officers in that branch of the service. Fisher accordingly was obliged to modify his reforms to exclude the Royal Marines in 1912.

He was appointed a Knight Grand Cross of the Order of the Bath (GCB) in the 1902 Coronation Honours list on 26 June 1902, and invested as such by King Edward VII at Buckingham Palace on 24 October 1902.

In 1903 he became Commander-in-Chief, Portsmouth, with HMS Victory as his flagship.

== First Sea Lord (1904–1910) ==
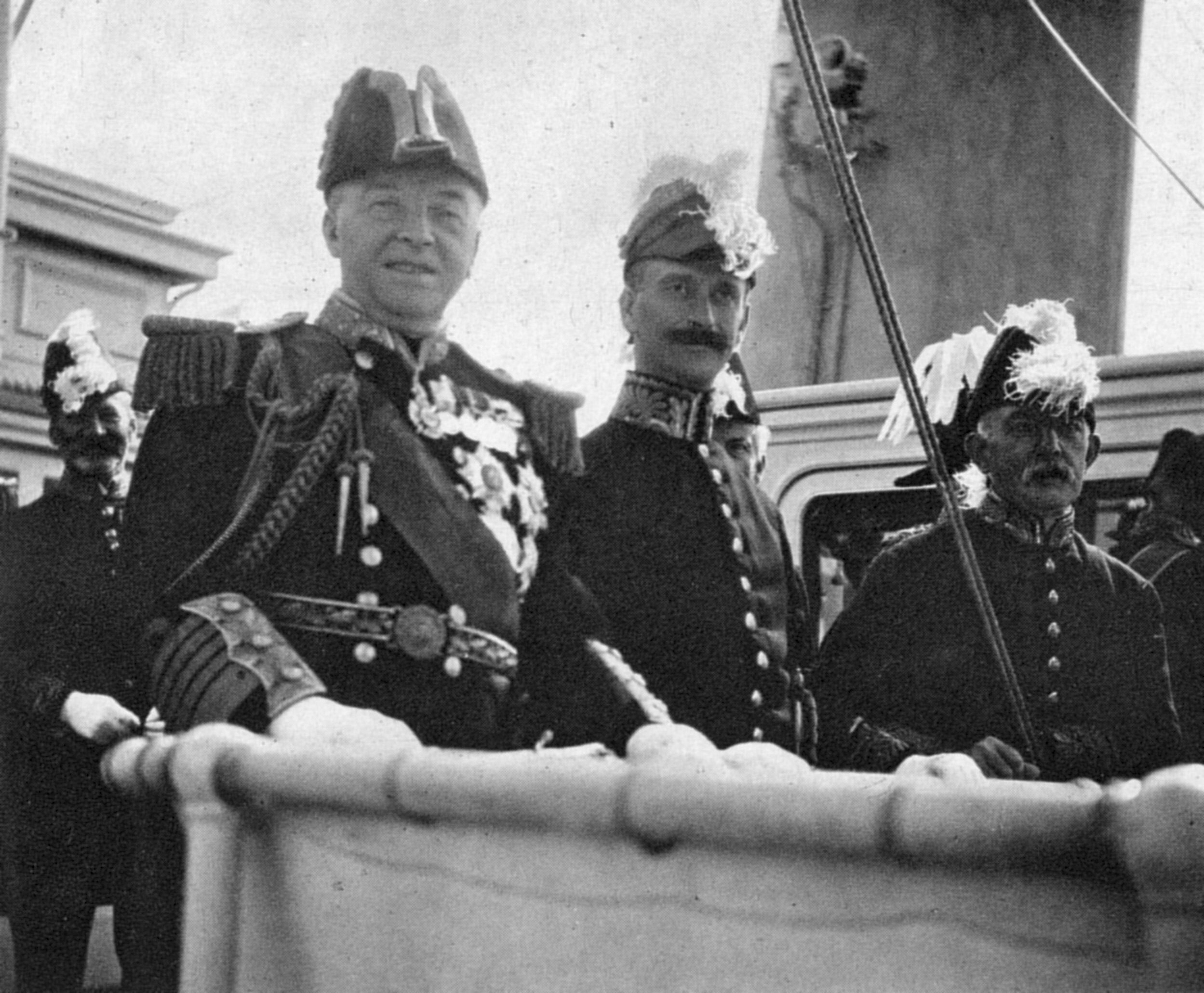
The Lords of the Admiralty attending the Naval Review, 1907. Fisher front left.

After spending September and the first half of October on the continent Fisher took office as First Sea Lord on 20 October 1904. The appointment came with a house in Queen Anne's Gate, but Fisher also leased Langham House, Ham where the family lived until his retirement. In June 1905 he was appointed to the Order of Merit (OM), in December he was promoted Admiral of the Fleet.

Fisher was brought into the Admiralty to reduce naval budgets, and to reform the navy for modern war. Amidst massive public controversy, he ruthlessly sold off 90 obsolete and small ships and put a further 64 into reserve, describing them as "too weak to fight and too slow to run away", and "a miser's hoard of useless junk". This freed up crews and money to increase the number of large modern ships in home waters. The navy estimate for 1905 was reduced by £3.5 million on the previous year's total of £36.8 million despite new building programs and greatly increased effectiveness. Naval expenditure fell from 1905 to 1907, before rising again. By the end of Fisher's tenure as First Sea Lord expenditure had returned to 1904 levels.

He was a driving force behind the development of the fast, all-big-gun battleship, and chaired the Committee on Designs which produced the outline design for the first modern battleship, HMS Dreadnought. His committee also produced a new type of cruiser in a similar style to Dreadnought with a high speed achieved at the expense of armour protection. This became the battlecruiser, the first being HMS Invincible. He also encouraged the introduction of submarines into the Royal Navy, and the conversion from a largely coal-fuelled navy to an oil-fuelled one. He had a long-running public feud with another admiral, Lord Charles Beresford.

In his capacity as First Sea Lord, Fisher proposed multiple times to King Edward VII that Britain should take advantage of its naval superiority to "Copenhagen" the German fleet at Kiel—that is, to destroy it with a pre-emptive surprise attack without declaration of war, as the Royal Navy had done against the Danish Navy during the Napoleonic Wars. In his memoirs, Fisher records a conversation where he was informed that "by all from the German Emperor downwards [he] was the most hated man in Germany", as the Emperor "had heard of [Fisher's] idea for the "Copenhagening" of the German Fleet." Fisher further added that he doubted that the suggestion had leaked out, and believed that "[the Emperor] only said it because he knew it was what [the British] ought to have done."

In 1908, he predicted that war between Britain and Germany would occur in October 1914, which later proved accurate, basing his statement on the projected completion of the widening of the Kiel Canal, which would allow Germany to move its large warships safely from the Baltic to the North Sea. He was appointed a Knight Grand Cross of the Royal Victorian Order (GCVO) that year.

On 7 December 1909, he was created Baron Fisher. He took the punning motto "Fear God and dread nought" on his coat of arms as a reference to Dreadnought.

== Before the war (1911–1914) ==
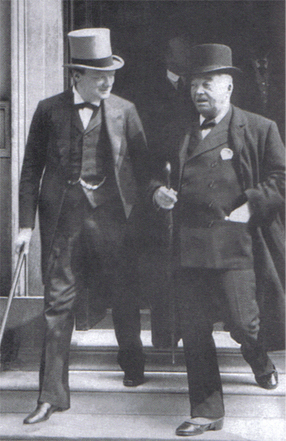
Admiral of the Fleet The Lord Fisher (right) with Churchill, First Lord of the Admiralty, 1913

He retired to Kilverstone Hall in Norfolk on 25 January 1911, his 70th birthday.

In 1912, Fisher was appointed chairman of the Royal Commission on Fuel and Engines, with a view to converting the entire fleet to oil. Classified "Secret", Fisher's Commission reported in on 27 November 1912, with two follow-up reports on 27 February 1913 and 10 February 1914.

Once the First World War broke out in August 1914, Fisher was a 'constant' visitor to Churchill at the Admiralty.

== First Sea Lord (1914–1915) ==
In October 1914 Lord Fisher was recalled as First Sea Lord, after Prince Louis of Battenberg had been forced to resign because of his German origin. The Times reported that Fisher "was now entering the close of his 74th year but he was never younger or more vigorous". He resigned on 15 May 1915 amidst bitter arguments with the First Lord of the Admiralty, Winston Churchill, over Gallipoli, causing Churchill's resignation too. Fisher was never entirely enthusiastic about the campaign—going back and forth in his support, to the consternation and frustration of members of the cabinet—and all in all preferred an amphibious attack on the German Baltic Sea coastline (the Baltic Project), even having the shallow-draft battlecruisers HMS Furious, HMS Glorious and HMS Courageous constructed for the purpose. As the Gallipoli campaign failed, relations with Churchill became increasingly acrimonious. One of Fisher's last contributions to naval construction was the projected HMS Incomparable, a mammoth battlecruiser which took the principles of the Courageous class another step further; mounting 20-inch guns, but still with minimal armour, Incomparable was never approved for construction.

Fisher's resignation was initially not taken seriously: "Fisher is always resigning" commented the Prime Minister H. H. Asquith. However, when Fisher vacated his room at the Admiralty with the announced intention of retiring to Scotland, the Prime Minister sent him an order in the King's name to continue his duties. Senior naval officers and the press made appeals to the now elderly (74) First Sea Lord to remain in his position. Fisher responded with an eccentric letter to Asquith setting out six demands that would "guarantee the successful termination of the war". These would have given him unprecedented sole authority over the fleet, including all promotions and construction. After commenting that Fisher's behaviour indicated signs of mental aberration, Asquith responded with a brusque acceptance of Fisher's original resignation.

== Last years (1915–1920) ==
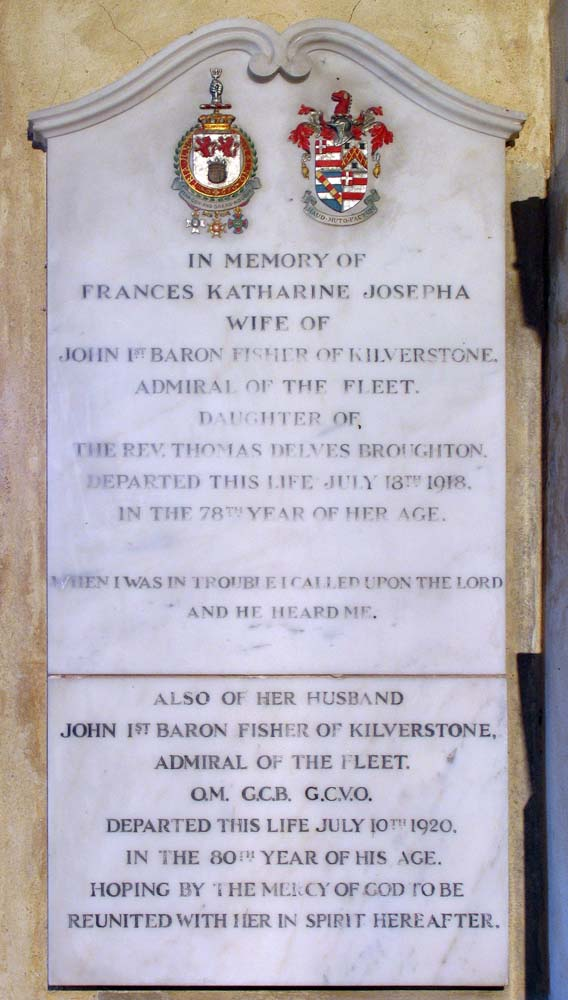
Mural monument to John Fisher, 1st Baron Fisher, St Andrew's Church, Kilverstone, Norfolk

Fisher was made chairman of the Government's Board of Invention and Research, serving in that post until the end of the war. In 1917 he accepted the Japanese Order of the Rising Sun with Paulownia Flowers, Grand Cordon, the highest of eight classes associated with the award, with the King's permission.

Admiral Fisher's wife, Frances, died in July 1918. She was cremated and her ashes were interred in St Andrew's churchyard, adjacent to Kilverstone Hall, on 22 July. Her coffin was draped with Fisher's flag as Admiral of the Fleet and topped by a coronet.

Fisher died of cancer at St James's Square, London, on 10 July 1920, aged 79, and he was given a national funeral at Westminster Abbey.

His coffin was drawn on a gun-carriage through the streets of London to Westminster Abbey by bluejackets, with six admirals as pall-bearers and an escort of Royal Marines, their arms reversed, to the slow beat of muffled drums. That evening the body was cremated at the Golders Green Crematorium. The following day, Fisher's ashes were taken by train to Kilverstone, escorted by a Royal Navy guard of honour, and were placed in the grave of his wife, underneath a chestnut tree, overlooking the figurehead of his first seagoing ship, HMS Calcutta.

== In folklore and popular culture ==
- A reference to Fisher was hidden as an encrypted message, the Smithy code, by Mr Justice Peter Smith in the April 2006 judgement on The Da Vinci Code plagiarism case. Smith's biography in Who's Who stated that he was a "Jackie Fisher fan".
- Fisher is credited by the Oxford English Dictionary with the earliest known use of the phrase "OMG" as an abbreviation for "Oh my God", in a letter to Winston Churchill on 9 September 1917. In Fisher's case it was "Oh! My God!"
- Fisher coined the phrase "Buggins' turn" to describe the practice of making appointments by rotation or seniority rather than by merit, which he saw as a problem within the navy.
- The song "Old Admirals" on the Al Stewart album Past, Present and Future is based largely on Fisher's life.
- Fisher makes an appearance as a midshipman during the Taiping Rebellion in George MacDonald Fraser's novel Flashman and the Dragon (1985).
- Fisher makes an appearance in the television mini-series Reilly: Ace of Spies (1983), Episode 1, portrayed by actor Denis Holmes.
- Fisher appears in the first episode of the 1985 Central Television serial The Last Place on Earth, in which he is portrayed by Jack May.

== Honours ==
- (United Kingdom of Great Britain and Ireland) Knight Commander of the Order of the Bath (1894)
- (United Kingdom of Great Britain and Ireland) Knight Grand Cross of the Order of the Bath (1902)
- (United Kingdom of Great Britain and Ireland) Order of Merit (1905)
- (United Kingdom of Great Britain and Ireland) Knight Grand Cross of the Royal Victorian Order (1908)
- (French Third Republic) Grand Cross of the Legion of Honour (1906)
- (Ottoman Empire) Order of Osmanieh (1900)
- (Empire of Japan) Order of the Rising Sun with Paulownia Flowers, Grand Cordon (1917)

== Bibliography ==
- Bacon, Admiral Sir Reginald Hugh (2007) [1929]. The Life of Lord Fisher of Kilverstone. Vol. 1 & 2 (Facsimile ed.). New York: Doubleday. ISBN 978-1-4325-9362-9. OCLC 1312880. Original edition published London, Hodder and Stoughton Limited
- Breyer, Siegfried (1973). Battleships and Battlecruisers of the World, 1905–1970. London: Macdonald. ISBN 0-356-04191-3.
- Dreyer, Admiral Sir Frederic C. (1955). The Sea Heritage, a Study of Maritime Warfare. Museum Press. OCLC 464512728.
- Fisher, John Arbuthnot Fisher, Baron (1919a). Memories, by the Admiral of the Fleet, Lord Fisher. London, New York [etc.]: Hodder and Stoughton. OCLC 573603. Archive.org facsimile
- Gough, Barry (2017). Churchill and Fisher: The titans at the Admiralty who fought the First World War. Lorimer. ISBN 978-1459411364.
- Heathcote, T. A. (2002). The British Admirals of the Fleet 1734 – 1995. Great Britain: Pen & Sword Books. ISBN 0-85052-835-6.
- Howarth, David (1980). The Dreadnoughts. Time Life. ISBN 978-0809427116.
- Hough, Richard (1969). Admiral of the Fleet: The Life of John Fisher. Macmillan. ISBN 978-1111875800.
- Hough, Richard (1992). Edward and Alexandra: Their Private And Public Lives. London: Hodder & Stoddart. ISBN 978-0312097936.
- Lambert, Nicholas A. (1999). Sir John Fisher's Naval Revolution. Columbia: University of South Carolina Press. ISBN 1-57003-492-3.
- Mackay, Ruddock Findlay (1973). Fisher of Kilverstone. London: Oxford University Press. ISBN 978-0198224099.
- Marder, Arthur, ed. (1953). Fear God and Dread Nought: Correspondence of Admiral of the Fleet Lord Fisher of Kilverstone. Vol. I 1854 -1904. Jonathan Cape. OCLC 6516064.
- Marder, Arthur, ed. (1956). Fear God and Dread Nought: Correspondence of Admiral of the Fleet Lord Fisher of Kilverstone. Vol. II. 1904–1914. Jonathan Cape. OCLC 58572329.
- Marder, Arthur, ed. (1959). Fear God and Dread Nought: Correspondence of Admiral of the Fleet Lord Fisher of Kilverstone. Vol. III. Restoration, Abdication & Last Years 1914–1920. Jonathan Cape. OCLC 58572354.
- Massie, Robert K. (1991). Dreadnought: Britain, Germany, and the Coming of the Great War. New York: Random House. ISBN 0-394-52833-6.
- Morris, Jan (1995). Fisher's Face. London: Viking. ISBN 9780571265930. Reprinted and published (2010) by Faber & Faber
- Penn, Geoffrey (1999). Fisher, Churchill, and the Dardanelles. Great Britain: Pen & Sword Books. ISBN 0-85052-646-9.
- Penn, Geoffrey (2001). Infighting Admirals: Fisher's Feud With Beresford and the Reactionaries. Casemate. ISBN 978-0850527568.
- Smith, Crosbie; Wise, M. Norton (1989). Energy and Empire: A Biographical Study of Lord Kelvin. Cambridge University Press. ISBN 978-0521261739.
- Sumida, Jon Tetsuro (1993). In Defence of Naval Supremacy: Finance, Technology, and British Naval Policy 1889–1914 (Paperback ed.). London & New York: Routledge. ISBN 978-1591148036.
- Tuchman, Barbara W. (1996). The Proud Tower (paperback ed.). Ballantine Books. ISBN 0345405013.
- Tuchman, Barbara W. (1962). The Guns of August. Macmillan. ISBN 034538623X. OCLC 30087894.
- Wright, William (2009). A Tidy Little War: The British Invasion of Egypt 1882. Stroud: Spellmount. p. 90. ISBN 9780752450902.
- One section of Fisher's service records form part of the document piece ADM 196/15 at The National Archives. A full PDF is available (fee required) Documents Online—Image Details—Lord Fisher of Kilverstone, John

Military offices
Preceded by Sir John Hopkins	Third Naval Lord and Controller of the Navy; 1892–1897	Succeeded by Sir Arthur Wilson
Preceded by Sir James Erskine	Commander-in-Chief, North America and West Indies Squadron; 1897–1899	Succeeded by Sir Frederick Bedford
Preceded by Sir John Hopkins	Commander-in-Chief, Mediterranean Fleet; 1899–1902	Succeeded by Sir Compton Domvile
Preceded by Sir Archibald Douglas	Second Naval Lord; 1902–1903	Succeeded by Sir Charles Drury
Preceded by Sir Charles Hotham	Commander-in-Chief, Portsmouth; 1903–1904	Succeeded by Sir Archibald Douglas
Preceded by Lord Walter Kerr	First Sea Lord; 1904–1910	Succeeded by Sir Arthur Wilson
Preceded by Prince Louis of Battenberg	First Sea Lord; 1914–1915	Succeeded by Sir Henry Jackson
Honorary titles
Preceded by Sir Henry Stephenson	First and Principal Naval Aide-de-Camp; 1904–1911	Succeeded by Sir Lewis Beaumont
Peerage of the United Kingdom
New creation	Baron Fisher; 1909–1920	Succeeded by Cecil Vavasseur Fisher
