= Arthur Marder =

American naval historian (1910–1980)

- Born: Arthur Jacob Marder; March 8, 1910; Boston, Massachusetts, U.S.
- Died: December 25, 1980 (aged 70); Santa Barbara, California, U.S.
- Education: Harvard University (PhD)
- Occupation: Naval historian
- Spouse: Jan North (m. 1955)
- Children: 3
- Parent(s): Maxwell J. Marder; Ida Greenstein

Arthur Jacob Marder (March 8, 1910 – December 25, 1980) was an American historian specializing in British naval history in the period 1880–1945.

== Early life and education ==
Born and raised in Boston, Massachusetts, Arthur Marder was the son of Maxwell J. Marder and Ida Greenstein. He attended Harvard University, where he obtained his bachelor's degree in 1931, his master's degree in 1934, and his Ph.D. in 1936 with a study of British naval policy 1880–1905.

== Career ==
Marder began his teaching career as an assistant professor of history at the University of Oregon in 1936–38. In 1939, he returned to Harvard in 1939–41 as a research associate at the Bureau of International Research and Radcliffe College. In 1941–42, he was a research analyst in the Office of Strategic Services, before becoming an associate professor of history at Hamilton College in 1943–44.

In 1944, he was appointed associate professor at the University of Hawaiʻi, where he remained for twenty years, becoming a full professor in 1951, then senior professor in 1958. In 1964, he was appointed professor of history at the University of California, Irvine, remaining there until he retired as professor emeritus in 1977.

He was visiting lecturer at Harvard University in 1949–50; George Eastman Professor at Oxford University and fellow of Balliol College, Oxford, in 1969–70.

== Family ==
He married Jan North in September 1955. They had three children.

== Death ==
Marder died December 25, 1980, of cancer in Santa Barbara, California.

== Awards and honors ==
Arthur Marder was a Guggenheim Fellow in 1941, 1945–46, and 1958. The American Historical Association awarded him the George Louis Beer Prize in 1941 for his Harvard doctoral thesis, published as Anatomy of British Sea Power. He was a Rockefeller Foundation Fellow in 1942–43, American Philosophical Society (APS) Fellow in 1956, 1958, 1963, and 1966. Marder was also elected a member of the APS in 1972. The Royal United Services Institute for Defence Studies awarded him the Chesney Gold Medal in 1968. He was made an honorary commander of the Order of the British Empire in 1970. Oxford University awarded him the degree of Doctor of Letters (D.Litt.) in 1971 and a Fellow of the Royal United Services Institute in 1977. He was a Fellow of the National Endowment for the Humanities, 1978–79, and the Australian-American Education Foundation awarded him a distinguished visitor award in 1979.

== Published works ==
- The Anatomy of British Sea Power: A History of British Naval Policy in the Pre-dreadnought Era, 1880–1905 (1940, 1964, 1972, 1976)
- Portrait of an Admiral: The Life and Papers of Sir Herbert Richmond (1952)
- Fear God and Dread Nought: The Correspondence of Admiral of the Fleet Lord Fisher of Kilverstone selected and edited by Arthur J. Marder, three volumes. v. 1. The Making of an Admiral, 1854–1904.—v. 2. Years of Power, 1904–1914.—v. 3. Restoration, Abdication, and Last Years, 1914–1920 (1952–59)
- From the Dreadnought to Scapa Flow: The Royal Navy in the Fisher Era, 1904–1919, five volumes (1961–70, 1978)
- Winston is Back: Churchill at the Admiralty, 1939–40 (1972)
- From the Dardanelles to Oran: Studies of the Royal Navy in War and Peace, 1915–1940 (1974)
- Operation 'Menace': the Dakar Expedition and the Dudley North Affair (1976)
- Naval Warfare in the Twentieth Century, 1900–1945: Essays in Honour of Arthur Marder edited by Gerald Jordan (1977)
- Old Friends, New Enemies: The Royal Navy and the Imperial Japanese Navy two volumes. [v. 1]. Strategic Illusions, 1936–1941 by Arthur J. Marder—v. 2. The Pacific War, 1942–1945 by Arthur J. Marder, Mark Jacobsen, and John Horsfield. (1981–1990)

== Sources ==
- Seligmann, Matthew S. "A Great American Scholar of the Royal Navy? The Disputed Legacy of Arthur Marder Revisited" The International History Review 38#5 (2016): pages 1040–54.
- Eugene L. Rasor, British Naval History Since 1815: A Guide to the Literature. New York: Garland, 1990, pages 34–38.
- Gough, B. M. (2010). Historical Dreadnoughts: Arthur Marder, Stephen Roskill and Battles for Naval History. Barnsley: Seaforth (Pen and Sword). ISBN 978-1-84832-077-2.
