= Leonard Walker =

British painter and stained glass artist (1877–1964)

- Born: 10 March 1877; London, England
- Died: 13 June 1964 (aged 87); London, England
- Occupation: Painter

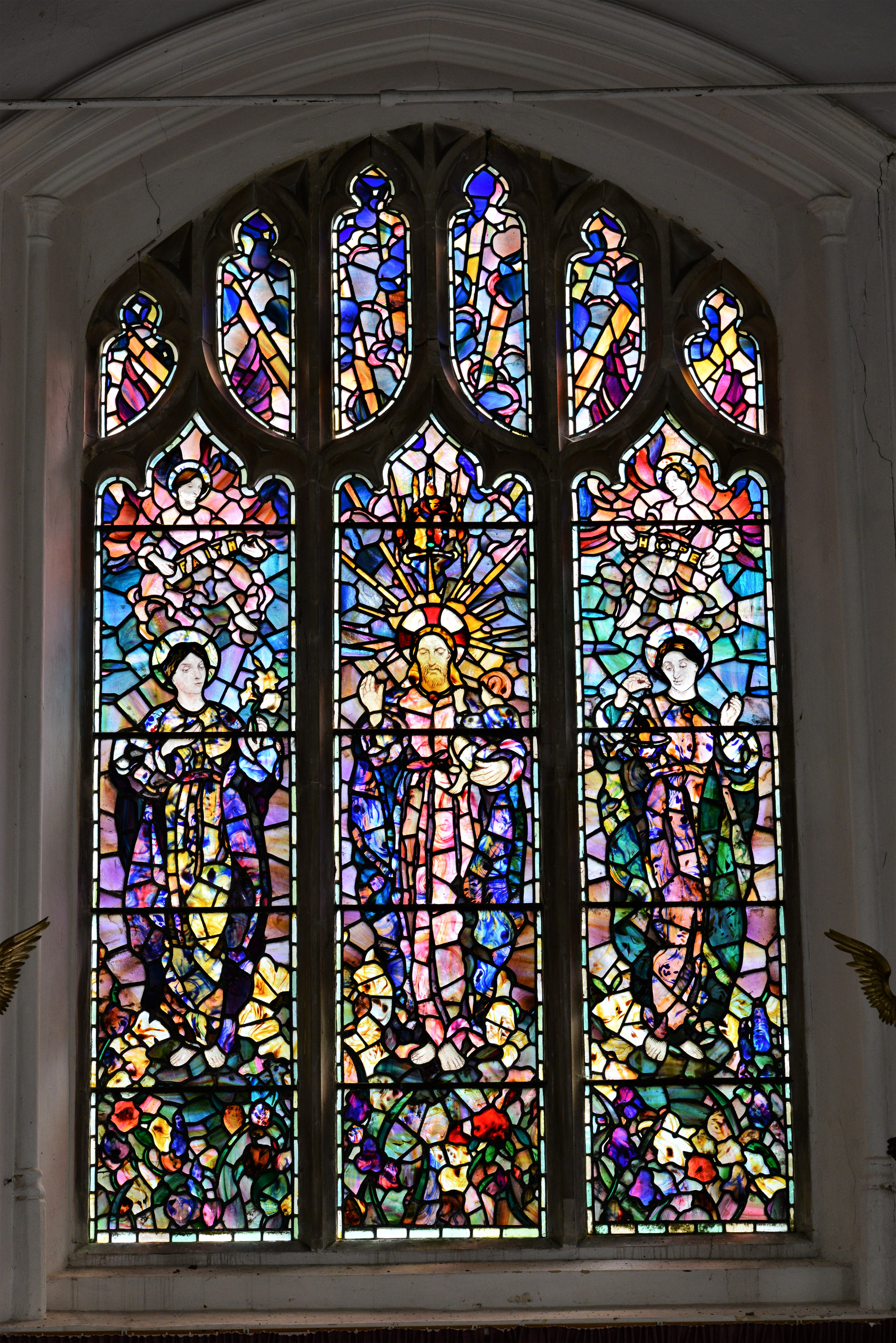
Walker's east window for All Saints' Church, East Tuddenham

Leonard Walker RBA RE RI (10 March 1877 – 13 June 1964) was a British painter and stained glass designer. His work was part of the painting event in the art competition at the 1928 Summer Olympics.

== Biography ==
Walker was a student at St John's Wood Art School, and would later teach and become Principal there. Walker was elected a member of the Royal Society of British Artists in 1913, of the Royal Society of Painter-Etchers in 1915 and the Royal Institute of Painters in Water Colours, and exhibited at Walker Art Gallery, the Royal Academy of Arts and the Royal Glasgow Institute of the Fine Arts. His work, A Bowl of Roses, was described by The Studio:

...an instructive example of the manner in which an unpretending subject can be dignified by sound craftsman and artistic resource. The artist's quietly confident draftsmanship and agreeable management of subdued yet effective colour give significance to a piece of work which in less able hands might easily have been trivial

His work as a stained glass artist was described in Modern Glass by Guillaume Janneau as:

The London artist has a remarkable gift for dramatic design. His "lead" outlines, which skilfully enhance the colours they frame, participate with amazing certainty in the general movement of the composition

Walker collaborated with Gilbert Bayes, on Bayes' first commission at Aldeburgh Church in Suffolk. He was a member of the Worshipful Company of Glaziers The Victoria and Albert Museum have a collection of Walker's work, while examples of his windows can be seen at All Saints, East Tuddenham, Norfolk, St Ethelburga's Bishopsgate, London and the East window at St Peter & St Paul, Tonbridge's Parish Church, which Gordon Rowe in The Daily Telegraph in 1955 described it as:

to me this window is more than an unusually beautiful creation. It unfolds its message with a heartfelt prayer

His later glass work was executed by James Powell and Sons. In 1930, he presented The Future of Stained Glass at the Exposition internationale des arts décoratifs et industriels moderne.

In 1939, Walker was selected as one of the artists to work on the National Gallery's project "Recording Britain:the changing face of Britain" established by Sir Kenneth Clark, with "Foundling Hospital, London" being one of his contributions. He was elected the Master of the Art Workers' Guild in 1950, previously being Master of the Junior Art Workers' Guild in 1905. Walker was married to fellow artist Aileen Hollely and his uncle was Frederick Walker.

In 2014, the Stained Glass Museum, Ely, held an exhibition of Walker's work.

== List of Works ==
- All Saints' Church, East Tuddenham, Norfolk (Faith, Hope and Charity)
- St. Michael's Church, Geldeston, Norfolk
- St. Andrew's Church, Kilverstone, Norfolk
