= RAF Mattishall =

Former RAF station in Norfolk, England

RAF Mattishall ~~RFC Mattishall~~
- Near Mattishall, Norfolk in England

Site information
- Type: Royal Air Force landing ground
- Owner: Air Ministry
- Operator: Royal Air Force; Royal Flying Corps

Location
- Shown within Norfolk
- Coordinates: 52°39′42″N 001°03′33″E

Site history
- Built: 1915
- In use: 1915-1919
- Battles/wars: First World War

Airfield information
- Elevation: 46 metres (151 ft) AMSL
Runways
Direction	Length and surface
00/00	Grass field

RAF Mattishall is a former Royal Flying Corps landing ground located 1 mile (1.6 km) east of Mattishall, Norfolk and 10.2 miles (16.4 km) north west of Norwich, Norfolk, England.

== History ==
The landing ground was in use during the First World War initially under the control of the Royal Flying Corps until 1 April 1918 when the site was turned over to the Royal Air Force and was renamed from RFC Mattishall to RAF Mattishall. The site was used by aircraft intercepting Zeppelin bombers. Aircraft of 51 Squadron operated from Mattishall.

== Current use ==
The airfield has been returned to use for agriculture.

== See also ==
- List of former Royal Air Force stations
