= Josiah Vavasseur =

English industrialist

- Born: 26 November 1834; Braintree, Essex
- Died: 13 November 1908 (aged 73); Thetford, Norfolk
- Spouse: Ruth Clifton
- Engineering career
- Discipline: Civil, Mechanical
- Institutions: Institution of Civil Engineers, Institution of Mechanical Engineers
- Significant design: Vavasseur mounting, gun designs, projectile designs

Josiah Vavasseur CB (26 November 1834 – 13 November 1908) was an English industrialist who founded Vavasseur and Co. (also known as London Ordnance Works). In 1883 the company merged with W.G. Armstrong and Company, and Vavasseur became a director of the firm. Late in life he adopted Cecil Fisher, only son of Admiral John Fisher, and the Fisher family inherited his fortune, including Kilverstone Hall.

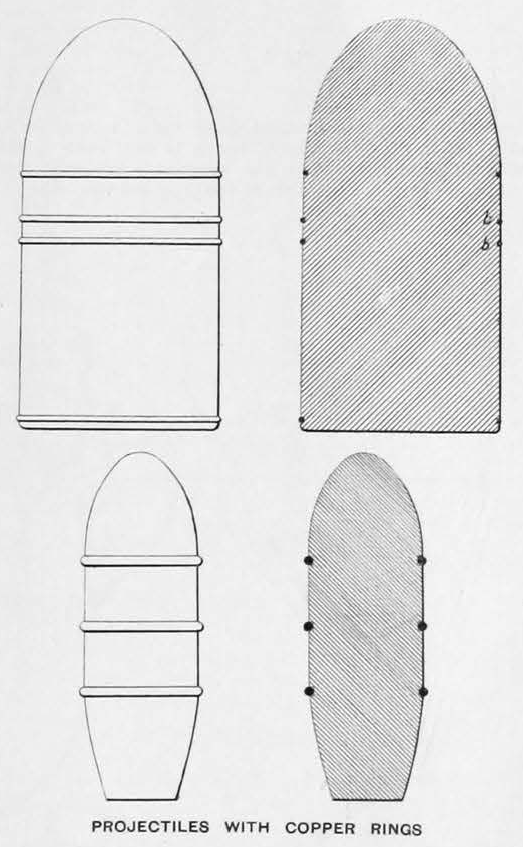
The rotating copper ring for projectiles laid the foundation of Vavasseur's fortune

== Early career ==
Vavasseur was born in Braintree, Essex, in 1834, and following school he spent six years as an apprentice to the engineering firm of James Horn and Company in Whitechapel. In 1857 he partnered with David Guthrie in establishing the Patent Dyewood and Drug Mills, at 17 New Park Street, Southwark. By 1860, he was in business as Josiah Vavasseur and Company, engineers of 8 Sumner Street, Southwark. He obtained a patent for improvements in cannon rifling and the firm bought a small iron works at 28 Gravel Lane, Southwark. In the same year Vavasseur became a member of the Honourable Artillery Company. In 1861 he developed a portable machine for the rifling of smooth-bore guns, which he later sold to Russia.

In 1862 Vavasseur's firm became subcontractor to Captain Alexander Blakely, RA, who held a number of patents in gun construction and sold guns to countries in Europe, South America and particularly North America, where demand was high due to the Civil War. Vavasseur initially produced a series of 2.9 inch guns for the Confederate States, but the ship carrying them foundered, and they never reached their destination. Vavasseur's rifling machine was employed by Blakely for the rifling of some of his largest guns. In 1863 Vavasseur and Blakely collaborated on the production of spherical steel shot, intended to penetrate the armour of ironclads coming into service at the time. Later in 1863 Josiah Vavasseur and Company merged with The Blakely Cannon Company, resulting in the Blakely Ordnance Company, with Josiah Vavasseur as engineer and manager. In 1865 the new company became The Blakely Ordnance Company, Limited with Vavasseur as Resident Engineer. One year later, the panic of 1866 caused a squeeze on liquidity that forced The Blakely Ordnance Company, Limited into liquidation, and Vavasseur out of his job.

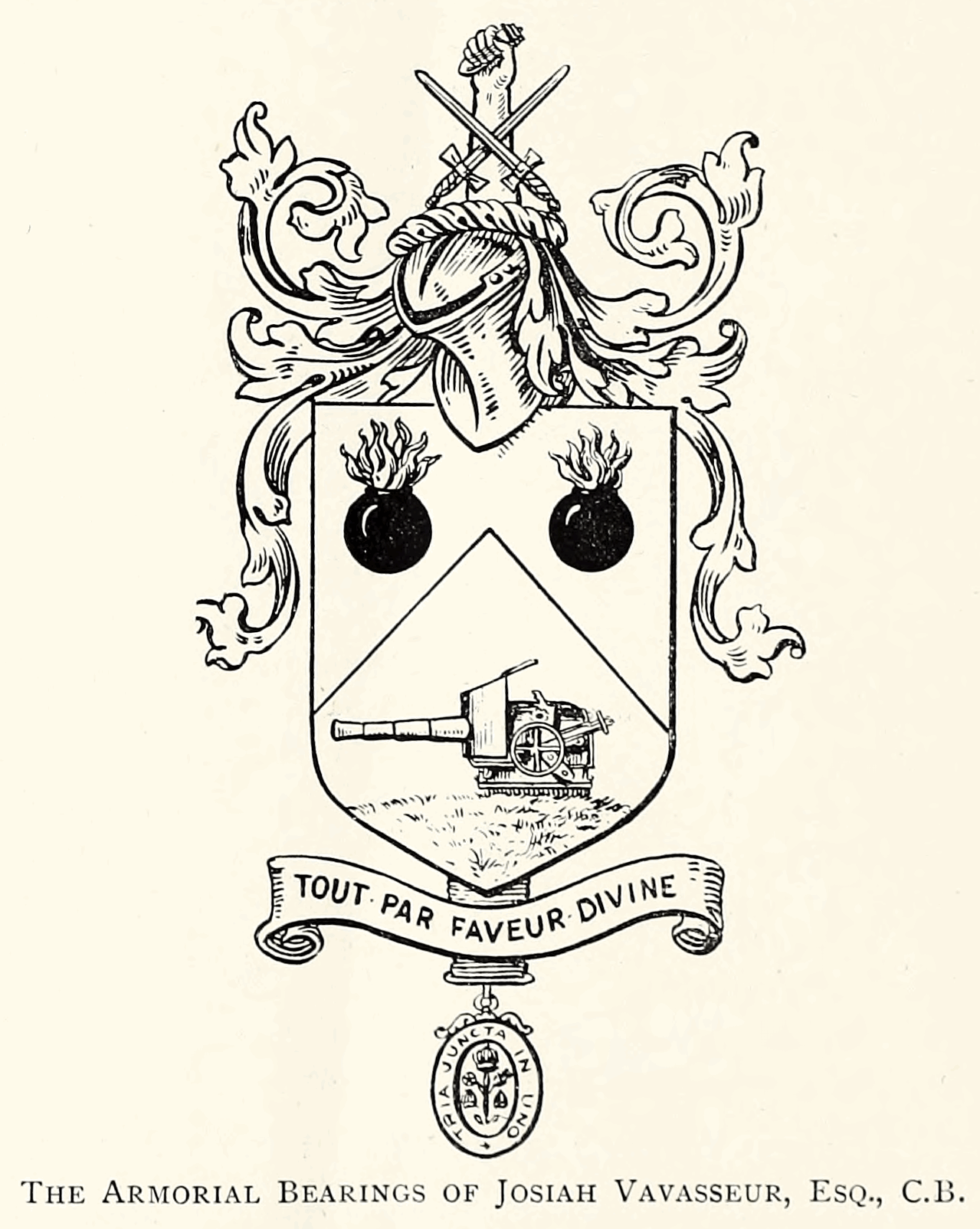
The Vavasseur gun mounting was so important to Josiah Vavasseur that he included it in his coat of arms.

== London Ordnance Works ==
The collapse of Blakely's enterprise made it possible for Vavasseur to buy back the iron works in Southwark, and in 1867 the firm Josiah Vavasseur and Company was back in business, commonly referred to as the London Ordnance Works. The company took over at least one of the orders in the books of the Blakely Company, for 11-inch steel guns, delivered to Chile in 1867. The continuation of Blakely's projects was made easier (and cheaper) by the fact that the strain on Blakely's personal finances had prevented the renewal of his gun patents. Vavasseur also made smaller guns, including 27 12-pounders for France during the Franco-Prussian War 1870–1871. The production at the Ordnance Works included towed torpedoes of the Harvey design and spar torpedoes and mines designed by Captain Charles Ambrose McEvoy, formerly of the Confederate Navy.

In 1866, he invented the copper rotating ring, or band, for the projectiles of breech-loading guns, and this system was widely adopted. The patent laws of Prussia prevented Vavasseur from protecting his invention in that country, and made it possible for the Krupp company to produce projectiles that Vavasseur saw as an infringement to his patent. The inventor tried to protect his claims in 1877, when British shipyards were building the Fusō and the two Kongō class ironclads for Japan. They were all armed with Krupp guns, and when the offending shells arrived in Britain, Vavasseur had an injunction placed on them. In the ensuing court case (and appeal) in 1878, it was decided that the Japanese Mikado (emperor) could not be sued and that his property (the shells) could not be held. The nature of the lawsuit was rather controversial and the verdict was frequently cited in works on international law.

In 1877, Vavasseur patented and developed a mounting for breech-loaded guns, which came to be used by most of the world's navies. The demand for the Vavasseur mounting was so high that London Ordnance Works was unable to cope, so in 1883, Josiah Vavasseur and Company merged with Sir W.G. Armstrong & Company. The Vavasseur company name disappeared, Josiah Vavasseur became a director, and all production was transferred to the Elswick Works. Here "he continued his work of improving ordnance in every detail," until the last three or four years of his life, when ill-health prevented his attendance.

== Final years ==
Josiah Vavasseur became a very wealthy man, and he was able to buy the manor of Kilverstone Hall and to donate substantial funds to religious and philanthropic undertakings, including Rothbury Hall in Greenwich, London.

The major part of his fortune went to Cecil Fisher, the only son of Admiral of the Fleet Sir John Fisher. The story of the inheritance was retold by The New York Times on 21 November 1910, when Cecil Fisher came to the United States to marry miss Jane Morgan. The paper wrote that Cecil Fisher as a young lieutenant had helped Vavasseur with his work on quick-firing guns at Whale Island, Hampshire. A friendship evolved, and Vavasseur adopted Cecil on the condition that he would take the name and arms of Vavasseur. When Josiah Vavasseur died on 13 November 1908, Cecil Vavasseur Fisher inherited the equivalent of two million USD (corresponding to $71.7 million in 2025), and when Admiral of the Fleet Fisher was made a baron on 7 December 1909, he took the title Baron Fisher, of Kilverstone in the County of Norfolk.
