= Kilverstone =

Civil parish in Norfolk, England

Coordinates: 52.43267°N 0.78312°E

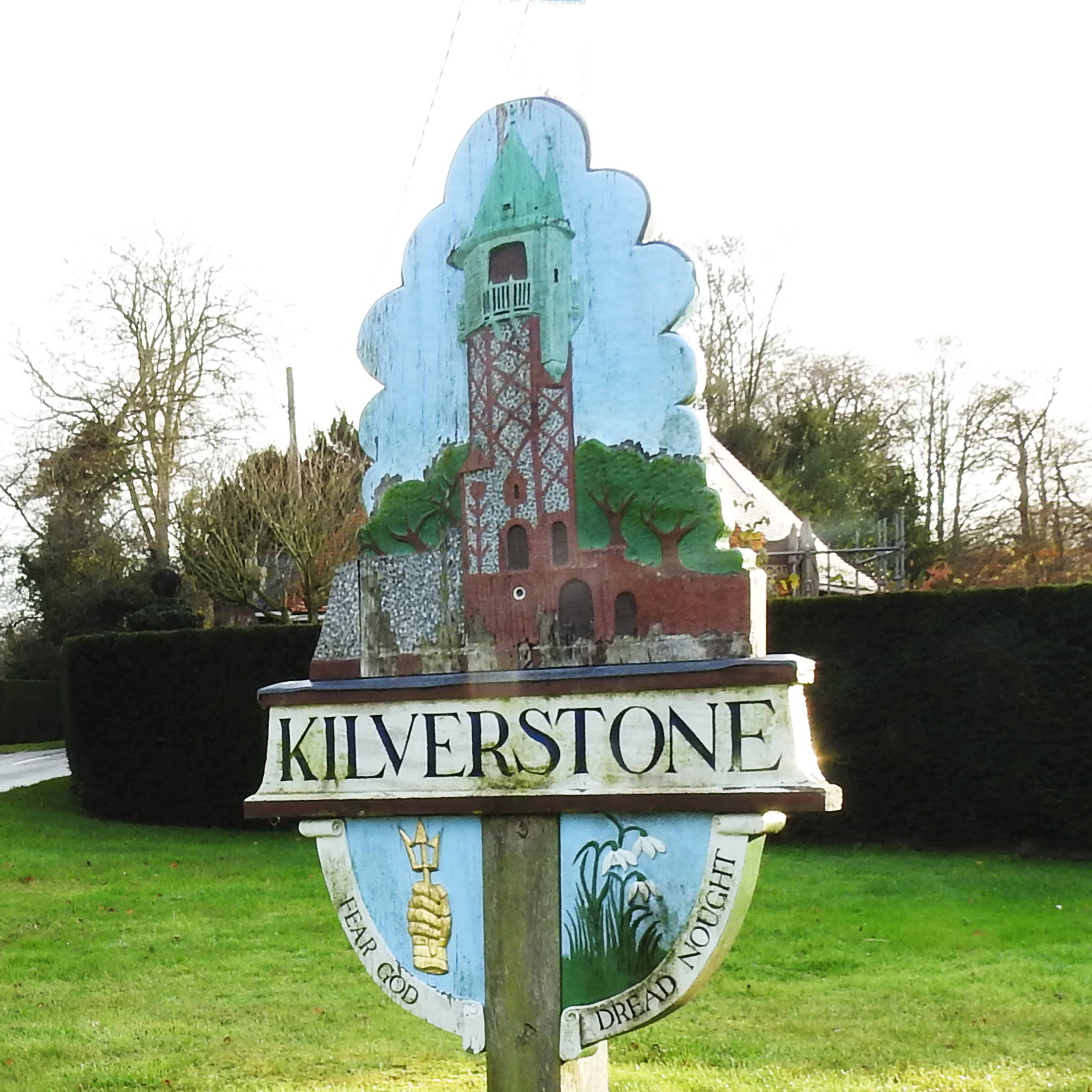
- Kilverstone Village Sign

- Location within Norfolk
- Area: 2.88 sq mi (7.5 km^{2})
- OS grid reference: TL892852
- Civil parish: Kilverstone
- District: Breckland
- Shire county: Norfolk
- Region: East
- Country: England
- Sovereign state: United Kingdom
- Post town: THETFORD
- Postcode district: IP24
- Dialling code: 01842
- Police: Norfolk
- Fire: Norfolk
- Ambulance: East of England
- UK Parliament: South West Norfolk

Kilverstone is a village and civil parish in Norfolk, England.

Kilverstone is located 1.3 miles (2.1 km) north-east of Thetford and 26 miles (42 km) south-west of Norwich.

== History ==
Kilverstone's name is of Viking origin and derives from the Old Norse for Kilvert's farmstead.

In the Domesday Book, Kilverstone is listed as a settlement of 18 households in the hundred of Shropham. In 1086, the village was divided between the East Anglian estates of King William I and Robert Malet.

During the 1840s, Kilverstone Heath was the scene of temporary wooden housing for navvies working on the railway. During the Second World War, a Type 22 Pillbox was built at the level crossing to defend Kilverstone against a possible German invasion.

== Geography ==
Due to its small size, population statistics are not collected for Kilverstone.

== St. Andrew's Church ==
Kilverstone's parish church is dedicated to Saint Andrew and dates from the 12th century, being one of Norfolk's 124 remaining round-tower churches. St. Andrew's is located on Kilverstone Road and has been Grade II listed since 1958. The church remains open for Sunday service once a month.

St. Andrew's features a stained-glass window designed by Leonard Walker and a set of royal arms from the reign of King George I.

== Kilverstone Hall ==
Kilverstone Hall was built in the 17th century in the Jacobean style for Thomas Wright. The house was subsequently bought by Josiah Vavasseur, an executive at Armstrong Whitworth, who sold the home to the family of Admiral John Fisher, 1st Baron Fisher.

== Notable residents ==
- Josiah Vavasseur CB- (1834-1908) industrialist, lived at Kilverstone Hall.
- Admiral of the Fleet John Fisher GCB OM GCVO, 1st Baron Fisher- (1841-1920) Royal Navy commander and naval reformer, retired to Kilverstone Hall.

== War Memorial ==
Kilverstone's war memorial is a marble plaque inside St. Andrew's Church which lists the following names for the First World War:

Rank	Name	Unit	Date of death	Burial/Commemoration
Capt.	Duncan C. Graham	7th Bn., Norfolk Regiment	28 Apr. 1917	Arras Memorial
LSjt.	James Maund	12th Bn., Suffolk Regiment	8 Jan. 1918	Mory Abbey Military Cemetery
AS	George Thirtle	Drake Bn., Royal Naval Division	13 Nov. 1916	Thiepval Memorial
Dvr.	Charles T. Goddard	127th Coy., Royal Engineers	1 Dec. 1918	Mikra British Cemetery
Pte.	Alfred C. Vincent	3rd Bn., Coldstream Guards	15 Sep. 1916	Thiepval Memorial
Pte.	William E. Goddard	6th Bn., Lancashire Fusiliers	5 Apr. 1918	Le Cateau British Cemetery
Pte.	Arthur H. Hatton	4th Bn., Loyal Regiment	15 Jun. 1915	Le Touret Memorial
Pte.	Percy A. Meadows	1st Bn., Norfolk Regiment	7 Sep. 1916	Thiepval Memorial
Pte.	George Vincent	7th Bn., North Staffordshire Regt.	25 Jan. 1917	Amara War Cemetery
