= Henry atte Stone =

Henry atte Stone may refer to:

- Henry atte Stone (fl.1388), MP for Bletchingley in 1388
- Henry atte Stone (fl.1421), MP for Bletchingley in 1421

== See also ==
- Henry Stone (disambiguation)
