= Eylove =

Eylove is a surname. Notable people with the surname include:

- Roger Eylove (disambiguation), several people
- Thomas Eylove, MP for Bletchingley (UK Parliament constituency)
