= William Tanner =

William Tanner may refer to:

== People ==
- William Tanner (politician) (1851–1938), New Zealand politician
- William G. Tanner (1930–2007), American academic and Southern Baptist pastor
- Dooee Tanner (William Henry Tanner, 1871–1938), Australian rugby union player
- William Tanner (cricketer) (1841–?), English cricketer
- William Elam Tanner (1836 –1898), Lieutenant Colonel, politician, and businessman
- William Tanner (MP for Bletchingley)

== Fictional people ==
- Bill Tanner, character in the James Bond franchise
- Dr. Bill Tanner, a villain from the Alex Rider novel Snakehead
- Willie Tanner, husband and father of the Tanner family in the TV series ALF
