= William Russell (Durham MP) =

British politician

William Russell (9 November 1798 – 30 January 1850) of Brancepeth Castle in County Durham was a British Whig politician. He sat in the House of Commons between 1822 and 1832.

== Background ==
He was the son of Matthew Russell and his wife Elizabeth Tennyson, and grandson of the wealthy William Russell of Brancepeth Castle. He was educated at Eton College and matriculated at St John's College, Cambridge, in 1818.

== In politics ==
Russell was elected at a by-election in 1822 as one of the two Members of Parliament (MPs) for borough of Saltash in Cornwall. He held that seat until the 1826 general election, when he was returned as an MP for the borough of Bletchingley in Surrey.

He resigned the Bletchingley seat in 1827 (by taking the Chiltern Hundreds) to stand at a by-election for County Durham. It was caused by the elevation of the Whig John George Lambton to the House of Lords.

On his home ground, Russell was returned without a contest. He was the county’s richest commoner, seen as a Canningite. The Marquess of Londonderry had a political reason — his man Sir Henry Hardinge was at that moment unavailable — for stepping aside as a backer of another candidate. Charles Tennyson, his uncle, ran his campaign in the constituency, with Robert William Mills, his steward. On election day, John Allan (1778–1844) of Blackwell Grange, son of his grandfather's banking partner Robert Allan, and Archibald Cochrane, proposed him, and Russell spoke in favour of Catholic emancipation and reform of the Corn Laws. He held the County Durham seat until the constituency was divided at the 1832 general election.

Russell was High Sheriff of Durham in 1841.

== Coalowner ==
The elder William Russell was admitted to the Grand Allies coal cartel, in the final quarter of the 18th century. His grandson continued to try for advantage in the traditional fashion in the industry of manipulation of accesses and wayleaves, using John Buddle in dealings with John Lambton and the Marquess of Londonderry. He is considered to have neglected Wallsend Colliery, however. It was a major part of the Russell's coal business, but eventually closed because of flooding.

== Health ==
An obituary stated that Russell withdrew from national politics, around 1832, "his state of health at that time being such as to render the step desirable". Margaret Escott in the History of Parliament calls Russell in the late 1820s "mentally unstable". Lord Durham assured Lord Grey at the time that Russell was a drunkard.

Parliament of the United Kingdom
Preceded by Matthew Russell; John Fleming	Member of Parliament for Saltash; 1822–1826; With: John Fleming	Succeeded by Andrew Spottiswoode; Henry Monteith
Preceded by Edward Henry Edwardes; Lord Francis Leveson-Gower	Member of Parliament for Bletchingley; 1826–1827; With: Charles Tennyson	Succeeded by Hon. William Lamb; Charles Tennyson
Preceded by John Lambton; Hon. William Powlett	Member of Parliament for County Durham; 1828–1832; With: Hon. William Powlett to 1831; Sir Hedworth Williamson, Bt 1831–1832	Constituency divided
Honorary titles
Preceded by Sir Hedworth Williamson, Bt.	High Sheriff of Durham; 1841	Succeeded by Robert Eden Duncombe Shafto
