= William Nightingale (disambiguation) =

William Nightingale (1794–1874) was the father of Florence Nightingale.

William Nightingale may also refer to:

- William Nightingale (footballer) (born 1995), English footballer
- William Nightingale (MP), English politician
