= John Bannerman =

John Bannerman may refer to:

- John Bannerman, Baron Bannerman of Kildonan (1901–1969), Scottish farmer, rugby union player and politician
- John Alexander Bannerman (1759–1819), Governor of Penang
- John Bannerman (historian) (1932–2008), Scottish historian
