= Grand Allies =

The Grand Allies, or Grand Alliance, was a cartel of English coal-owning families formed in 1726. It was based on the Northumberland and Durham Coalfield, and played a major role in the economics of mining coal from the field for about a century. Over time, other families joined the original main three. The Grand Allies were superseded by the "Limitation of the Vend", another north eastern cartel.

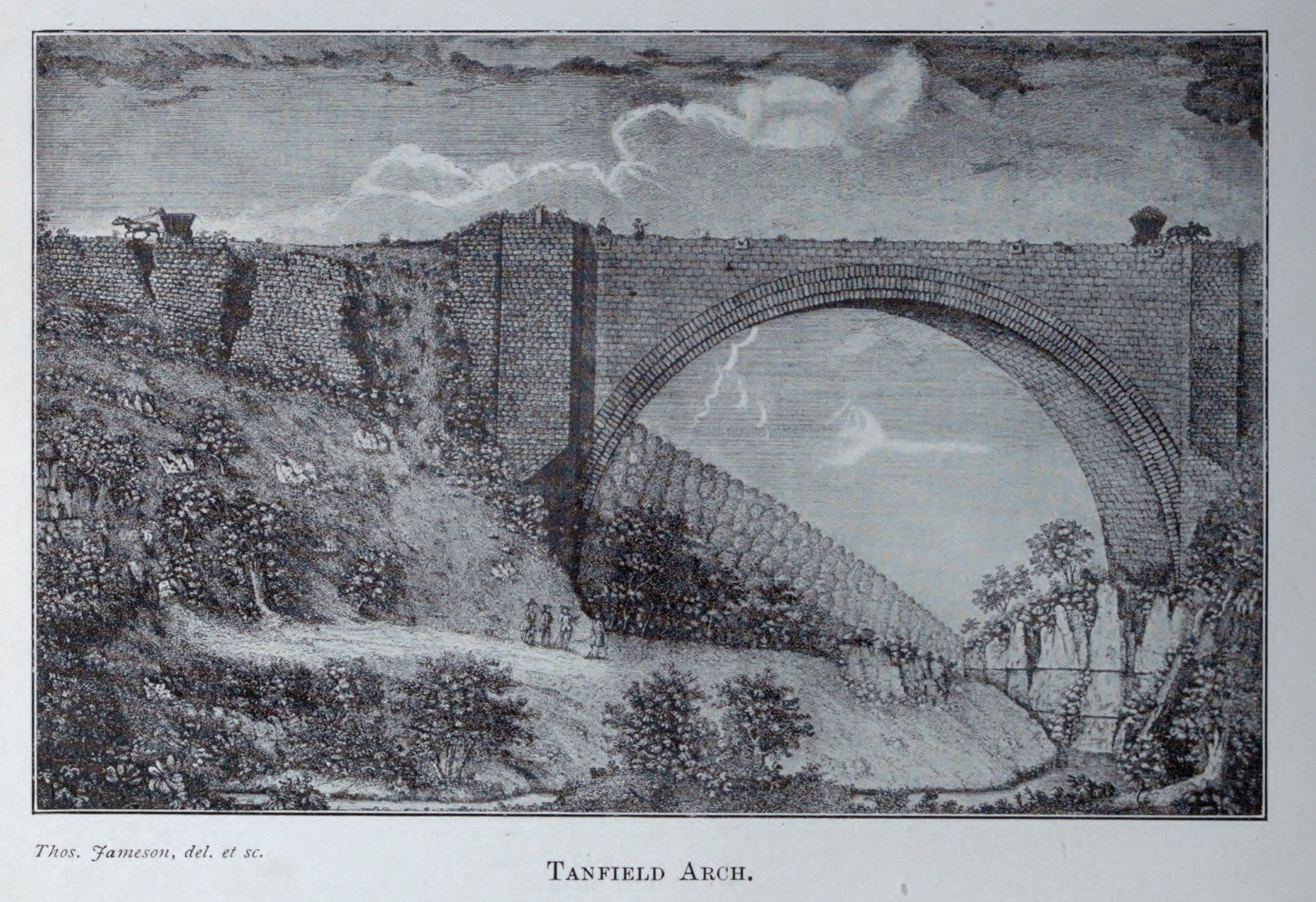
The Causey Arch, or Tanfield Arch, built c.1726 by the Grand Allies

== Early period ==
Up to around 1700 a guild, the Hostmen of Newcastle upon Tyne, had an effective monopoly of the coal trade locally. After a decline in the control of the Hostmen, "combinations" of coal owners vied for advantage.

The original focus of the Grand Allies group was the construction of the Tanfield Waggonway, to transport coal from inland mines in County Durham to the River Tyne. It ran from Tanfield to Dunston, a distance of about 5 miles (8.0 km). The founders were George Liddell, Sidney Wortley Montagu shortly succeeded by his son Edward Wortley Montagu, and George Bowes, with the participation also of William Cotesworth and Thomas Ord. They were the signatories to an agreement of 27 June 1726. From a legal point of view, the Grand Allies were a joint-stock company, but one that was not incorporated.

The ground had been laid in the years 1715 to 1726, by the purchase of mining leases and wayleaves. The merchant Cotesworth, who died at the end of 1726, had been instrumental in bringing the group together. Thomas Ord was father of William Ord of Fenham.

The Political State of Great Britain in 1740 commented:

[...] the Gentlemen who by some are call'd the Grand Allies, expended in [their collieries] above Fifty Thousand Pounds, besides Seventy or Eighty Thousand Pounds more in laying Waggon-Ways, building Steaths, &c.

It was a transitional time for coal production in the area. The collieries north of the Tyne and west of the River Ouseburn, from 1700 to 1730, largely produced "landsale" coal consumed locally, rather than "seasale" coal exported down the Tyne. There was then a change, and by 1770 a number of new, technologically more advanced mines north of the Tyne had been opened, in competition for the seasale trade with those south of the Tyne. One at East Denton, a Grand Allies property, was "won" just before 1770, at a high rent.

== Monopoly and dead rents ==
There were two main aspects to the cartel: manipulation of coal output, and pooling of capital. "Regulation", or restriction of output of coal to support the price, had already been used earlier in the century, was employed intermittently, and had only partial success; Sidney Wortley Montagu, who died in 1727, had previously been, from 1709 to 1716, in the "Regulation" of five major coal-owners that broke up acrimoniously.

Another side of the first aspect was the use of "dead rents": the deliberate keeping out of production of collieries on which rents were being paid. The Grand Allies applied dead rents strategically, for long periods, for example to St Anthony's Colliery at Byker. They were also accused of building staiths simply to deny the chance of others doing so on the waterfront.

== From 1770 ==
The period to 1770 was one in which the Grand Allies had a clear regional dominance. In the second quarter of the 18th century, of nine collieries opened in the north-east, eight were controlled by the Grand Allies. During that time coal mining spread into the area between the River Team and River Derwent, tributaries flowing north into the Tyne.

That degree of control fell away, because of technical advances but also because the banking system enabled new entrants to finance coal mines. From the end of the Seven Years' War, there was growth in private banks, and improved steam pump technology, key to exploiting mines that previously not been viable.

In time, the initial tight group of coal-owners admitted others. William Russell, who in 1781 leased Wallsend Colliery and later bought Brancepeth Castle, was a conspicuous example. There were also the Brandling family of Gosforth, and Matthew Bell of Woolsington. Charles John Brandling of the Grand Allies was responsible for the winning of the Gosforth Colliery in the 1820s. Matthew Bell married into the Brandlings, and his son Matthew Bell (1793–1871) inherited a Grand Allies position.

After the near-monopoly on local coal for the Grand Allies waned in market importance, the "Limitation of the Vend" coal producers' organisation succeeded it in keeping prices high in a more developed cartel structure, with production quotas. The advent of the steam locomotive and the pioneering Stockton and Darlington Railway were directly connected to the concentration of Grand Allies pits around Killingworth (see Killingworth locomotives). The long-term effect of the development of railways was then to reduce the importance of the Northumberland and Durham coalfield, because it provided a logistical solution for the transport to London of coal from other areas.

The major landowners of the region who were coal producers in their own right sold out in the period 1840 to 1860. In 1843 they were from the original "Grand Allies" families, by then represented by James Stuart-Wortley, 1st Baron Wharncliffe, Thomas Liddell, 1st Baron Ravensworth, and Thomas Lyon-Bowes, 11th Earl of Strathmore and Kinghorne, with the trustees acting for George Lambton, 2nd Earl of Durham, a minor, and Charles Vane, 3rd Marquess of Londonderry.

== Sources ==
- Smailes, AE (1960). North England. Edinburgh: Thomas Nelson & Sons Ltd.
