= William Russell (banker) =

English merchant, coal-fitter and banker

William Russell (1734–1817) was an English merchant, coal-fitter and banker. He first went into business as a merchant in Sunderland. He then made a substantial personal fortune from coal mining.

== Background ==
The Russell family has been traced back to Duddon Bridge, near Millom (now in Cumbria). William Russell was the second son of Robert Russell (died 1757) of Rowenlands (also Roanlands), near Haverigg in Cumberland. His uncle Matthew Russell moved to Sunderland in 1717 and was in business there as a timber merchant and shipbuilder. He became blind, and William Russell took over the business. Matthew Russell died childless in 1760. He and Robert each left William £10,000.

== Coal leases ==
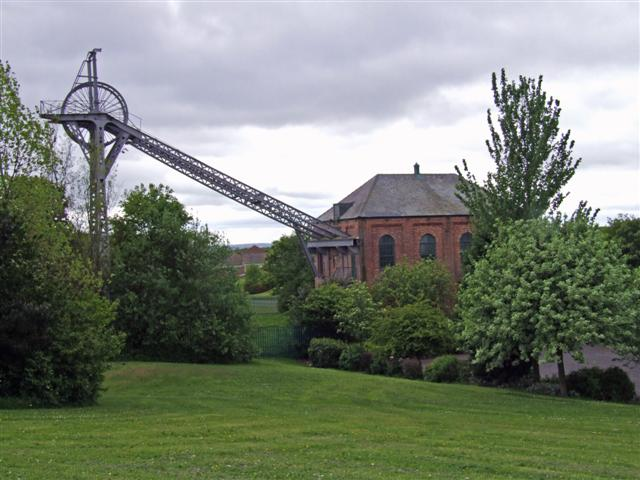
F Pit Museum, Albany, Tyne and Wear, a pit sunk by William Russell in the 1770s

Russell took on a lease for New Washington colliery in 1775; the royalty holder in 1820, in the time of his son as owner, was Sir Wilfrid Lawson, 1st Baronet, of Brayton. He took on a further lease, of Wallsend Colliery, in 1787. The royalties were held by the dean and chapter of Durham Cathedral. The terms were such that he generated a large personal income. He became very wealthy; and left "personalty sworn under £160,000" at his death.

The Russells joined the Grand Allies. This was a group of coal-owning families, active in exploiting the Northumberland and Durham Coalfield. They developed pre-steam waggonways, and a system of wayleaves worked out with landowners, to extract coal. Others involved were the Brandlings, Liddells and the Bowes family. Wayleaves for the coalfield were strategic tools, and were used to support monopoly. Around 1825 William Russell the grandson was negotiating for a deal with the Marquess of Londonderry and John George Lambton for wayleave access to Penshaw on the River Wear, in return for blocking construction of the Stockton and Darlington Railway.

== Sunderland bank ==
Joseph Maude, one of the founders of the bank in Kendal, recorded a bill on the Sunderland Bank in 1774; he had an account there. Russell, Allan & Wade, as it was termed in a 1790s directory entry, had Hankey & Co. as the London bank on which it drew. It was the first bank in Sunderland.

With a change of partner, the bank then traded as Russell, Allan & Maling. It closed before 1803. The three partners, William Russell, Robert Allan, and John Maling I, married three sisters, the daughters of Robert Harrison. Robert Allan (1740–1806) was a younger brother of George Allan, of the Blackwell Grange family, sons of the wealthy attorney James Allan (1712–1790) and his wife Elizabeth Pemberton.

=== John Maling I ===
John Maling and his elder brother Christopher Thompson Maling went into business with the support of their father William Maling. The family bought Wood House, near Hylton Ferry, in 1750, and with clay from North Hylton they started a pottery. They produced brown earthenware from 1762; and later pink lustreware. The business was moved from the North Hylton Works to the Ouseburn valley, Tyneside in 1815, by John's son Robert. At this point the North Hylton works was taken over by John Phillips.

John Maling married the widowed May née Harrison as his second wife.

== Interests and benefactions ==
During the French Revolutionary and Napoleonic Wars Russell raised a body of County Durham infantry, the Usworth yeomanry cavalry, and the Wallsend Rifles commanded by John Buddle. He founded a hospital at Cornsay.

== Property, politics and Brancepeth Castle ==
Russell had a house on the High Street, Sunderland; he let it in 1781. He bought Hardwick Hall in 1780, from John Burdon.

Russell lived in Newbottle, from where at Russell House farm he wrote in 1787 to William Cullen about his daughter Margaret's health. In 1797 he bought Brancepeth Castle. The Brancepeth estate was sold to him by Sir Henry Vane-Tempest, 2nd Baronet, who had inherited it in 1794 from John Tempest Sr., for £75,000. The castle was eventually much altered, by his son and grandson, who employed respectively John Paterson and Anthony Salvin. His elder brother Matthew Russell (1733–1803) left Russell the Rowenlands estate, which he then sold. Or possibly some only was sold, with a later sale by Matthew, William's son in 1819, to William Hodghson, of Roanlands.

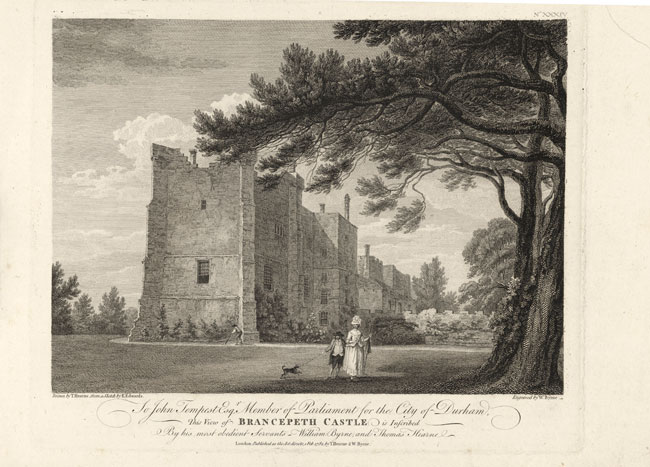
Brancepeth Castle, 1782 engraving

Around 1815, Russell bought the pocket borough of Bletchingley. He had had partial control of Saltash from an earlier point. There Russell had in effect bought the one seat, of two, managed by the Buller family, and had his son Matthew elected, in 1802. Saltash being a burgage tenement, it was not a simple nomination. At Great Grimsby, a "notoriously venal borough", Charles Tennyson, brother-in-law to Matthew Russell, aimed to enter parliament with him in 1807, relying on William Russell's funding, and keeping out John Henry Loft. Such plans came to nothing during William's lifetime. There was local opposition from Lord Yarborough and Ayscoghe Boucherett.

== Family ==
Escutcheon of Russell of Brancepeth

Russell married, firstly, Mary Harrison, daughter of Robert Harrison of Sunderland. Matthew Russell, Member of Parliament for Bletchingley and Saltash, was their only son. He married Elizabeth, daughter of George Tennyson who was briefly MP for Bletchingley; she was aunt to Alfred Tennyson the poet.

Their daughter Margaret (died 1842) married Gordon Drummond, son of Colin Drummond; whose daughter Eliza married in 1832 Henry Howard, 2nd Earl of Effingham. Their other daughter, Mary, married in 1810 Welch Hamilton Bunbury of the 3rd Regiment of Foot, who died in 1833. He had been awarded a gold medal in 1809 after the Battle of Talavera. (His forenames are variously given. In some legal documents and reports they are Walsh Hamilton, in others as Welsh Hamilton. Bunbury is mentioned in the London Gazette, 1836 as Welch Hamilton. Burke in discussing their daughter Mary Diana calls him Hamilton Welch.)

By a second wife, Anne Milbanke daughter of Edward Milbanke, Russell had no children.
