= John Fleming (Gatton and Saltash MP) =

British politician, surgeon and naturalist

John Fleming FRS FRSE FLS (1747–17 May 1829) was a British surgeon of the Indian Medical Service, naturalist, and politician. While in India he served as an interim superintendent of the Royal Botanic Garden, Calcutta before William Roxburgh took charge. He was the Member of Parliament (MP) for Gatton 1818–1820, Saltash 1820–1826. Fleming was an amateur botanist and a Fellow of the Royal Society of London, Royal Society of Edinburgh and the Linnean Society.

== Life ==
Fleming studied medicine at the University of Edinburgh and joined the Indian Medical Service in August 1768 as an assistant surgeon in Bengal. He became a surgeon in 1771 and was made a member of the medical board in 1786 and became a president of the board on 8 December 1800. He served as the interim superintendent of the Royal Botanic Garden, Calcutta after the death of Robert Kyd until William Roxburgh took over. Fleming published A catalogue of Indian medicinal plants and drugs, with their names in the Hindustani and Sanscrit languages appeared in Asiatick Researches (11, 1810, 153–96). He retired in 1811 and returned to Britain in 1813. During his time in India he befriended both Francis Buchanan-Hamilton and Thomas Hardwicke. He also conducted a long correspondence with Sir Joseph Banks including sending him plant samples such as Thibet (Tibet) Musk. William Roxburgh named the legume genus Flemingia after him.

In 1813 he became a Fellow of the Royal Society of London and in 1817 a Fellow of the Royal Society of Edinburgh. His proposers for the latter were Sir William Arbuthnot, 1st Baronet, Tb Allan and David Brewster.

On his return he lived on Chandos Street off Grosvenor Square in London and later (1816) in Gloucester Place. He died in London on 17 May 1829. A revised obituary was written by botanist James Britten in 1916 which resolved confusion with John Fleming (1785-1857).

In 1882 the Department of Botany (of the University of London) bought 13 folio volumes of drawings of Indian plants, mainly from the Punjab area, organised by Fleming (but drawn largely by Indian natives) which are now in the British Museum. Another collection of paintings of animals made by Indian artists is in the Victoria Memorial Museum in Kolkata.

== Publications ==
- A Catalogue of Indian Medicinal Plants (Calcutta, 1810)

Parliament of the United Kingdom
Preceded by William Congreve; Sir Mark Wood, Bt	Member of Parliament for Gatton; 1818 – 1820; With: Abel Rous Dottin	Succeeded by Jesse Watts-Russell; Thomas Divett
Preceded by Michael Prendergast; Matthew Russell	Member of Parliament for Saltash; 1820 – 1826; With: Matthew Russell to 1822; William Russell 1822–26	Succeeded by Henry Monteith; Andrew Spottiswoode
