= Sir Charles Talbot, 2nd Baronet =

British politician

Sir Charles Talbot, 2nd Baronet (8 November 1751 – 3 November 1812) was a British politician.

A member of a junior branch of the Talbot family headed by the Earl of Shrewsbury, Talbot was the son of Sir Charles Henry Talbot, 1st Baronet, son of Major-General Sherrington Talbot, son of William Talbot, Bishop of Durham. Charles Talbot, 1st Baron Talbot was his uncle and William Talbot, 1st Earl Talbot, his cousin. He sat as Member of Parliament for Weobly from 1800 to 1802, for Rye from 1803 to 1806 and for Bletchingley in 1812.

Talbot never married. He died in November 1812, aged 60, and was succeeded in the title by his younger brother, George.

Parliament of Great Britain
Preceded by Inigo Freeman Thomas; Lord George Thynne	Member of Parliament for Weobley; March 1800 – Dec 1800; With: Lord George Thynne	Succeeded by Parliament of the United Kingdom
Parliament of the United Kingdom
Preceded by Parliament of Great Britain	Member of Parliament for Weobley; 1801–1802; With: Lord George Thynne	Succeeded by Robert Steele; Lord George Thynne
Preceded by Lord Hawkesbury; Thomas Davis Lamb	Member of Parliament for Rye; 1802–1806; With: Thomas Davis Lamb to April 1806; Sir Arthur Wellesley from April 1806	Succeeded by Patrick Crauford Bruce; Michael Angelo Taylor
Preceded by Charles Cockerell; William Kenrick	Member of Parliament for Bletchingley; Oct 1812 – Dec 1812; With: William Kenrick	Succeeded by Matthew Russell; William Kenrick
Baronetage of Ireland
Preceded by Charles Henry Talbot	Baronet ( of Mickleham and Belfast); 1798–1812	Succeeded by George Talbot
