= Bicknacre Priory =

Former priory in Essex, England

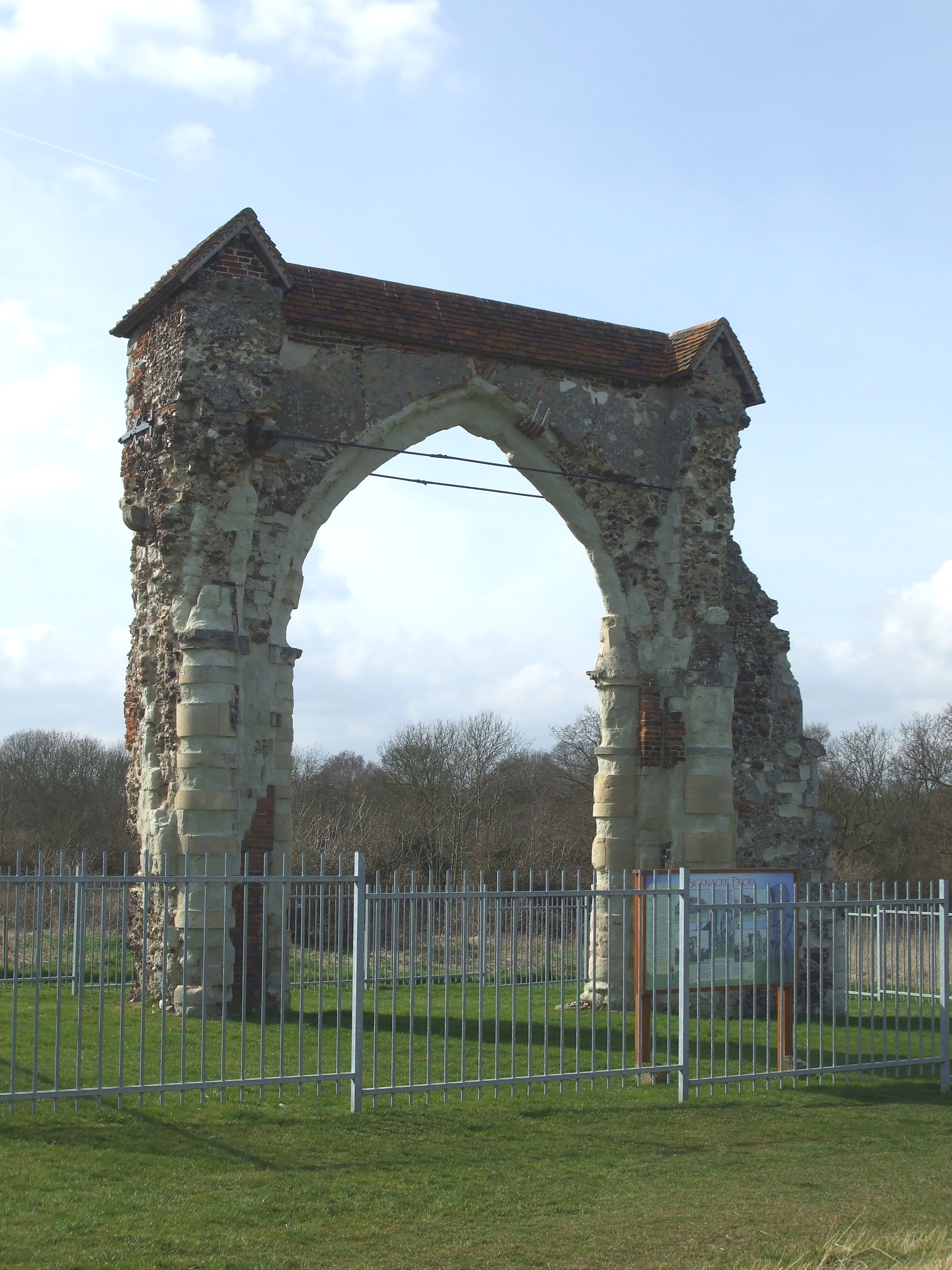
Priory arch, Bicknacre

Bicknacre Priory, formerly also Woodham Priory or Woodham Ferrers Priory, was a community of Austin Canons in Bicknacre, Woodham Ferrers, Essex, England.

== History ==
The original foundation, dating from some time before 1157, was a hermitage, which about the end of 1175 was converted into a house of Austin Canons by Maurice FitzGeoffrey of Tilty, formerly sheriff of Essex. He had accumulated a large debt to the king (Henry II), which he was eventually pardoned for founding the priory and its church, credited as a royal foundation and dedicated to St. Mary and St. John the Baptist. The canons were at first known as the canons of Woodham; the name "Bicknacre" does not occur till about the beginning of the following (13th) century.

Henry II confirmed the possessions of the priory, and Richard I granted a further charter. On 22 March 1255 Henry III granted the canons licence to hunt hare, fox and cat in the forest and free warren in their demesne lands within it. All these charters were confirmed by Henry VI in 1449.

The church of Woodham Ferrers was granted to them by the Earl of Derby, though it does not appear that they ever presented to it. They also had half of the church of Steeple, where they shared the presentation to the vicarage with Stansgate Priory. Bicknacre's possessions were not extensive, and it was often in financial difficulties. Throughout the 15th century the priory appears to have gradually fallen into decay, until on 10 February 1507, it was found by inquisition that Edmund Godyng, late prior, had died on 20 January seised of the priory, monastery, house and church of Bicknacre, the manor of Bicknacre, and thirty messuages, 300 acres of land, 40 acres of meadow, 60 acres of wood, 500 acres of pasture, 62 acres of marsh and £5 rent in Woodham Ferrers, Danbury, Norton, Steeple, Chelmsford, Mayland, Stowe, East Hanningfield, Hanningfield, Purleigh, Burnham and Downham, held of the king in chief in frankalmoin, and worth in all £40 10s. 0d. yearly; there were at the time no canons in the priory, and it was dissolved and terminated, reverting to the king, who granted it with all its possessions for the sum of £400 to the Hospital of St. Mary without Bishopsgate (St. Mary Spital), London, to which it was united on 9 November 1509.

After the suppression of the hospital in 1538 during the Dissolution of the Monasteries the priory and all its possessions, including the advowsons of the churches of Woodham Ferrers and Steeple, were granted on 23 February 1540 to Henry Polsted of London.

== Remains ==
There are no surviving remains of the priory or its church except for a single arch believed to be the west side of the church crossing, dating from approximately 1250. The surrounding area is known as Priory Fields.

== Priors ==
The following list is almost complete:

- Thomas
- Robert
- Ralph, died 1237
- Andrew, elected 1237, resigned 1255
- Ralph, elected 1255, resigned 1268
- John de Sancto Edmundo, elected 1268, resigned 1272
- Ralph de Dunham, elected 1272, died 1273
- William de Wilburgham, elected 1273, died 1281
- Alan de Bercking, elected 1282, died 1288
- Benedict de Roffen', elected 1288, died 1300
- Robert de Blakenham, elected 1300, resigned 1315
- Robert de Ramesdene or Burre, elected 1315, resigned 1321
- Matthew de Graftone or Langeton, elected 1321, died 1324
- Reginald de Theyden, collated 1325, resigned 1341
- Ralph de Chishull, elected 1341, died 1361
- William de Purle, elected 1361, died 1375
- John de Thaxstede, elected 1375, died 1386
- John Gosfeld, elected 1386, died 1396
- William Wynchestre, elected 1396, died 1418
- John Horewode, elected 1418, resigned 1421
- John Ocle, elected 1421, died 1436
- John Colman, elected 1436, occurs 1449
- John Cradock, resigned 1479
- William Chevyngton, collated 1479, resigned 1490
- Richard Petyrton, collated 1490, resigned 1499
- William Bowland, collated 1499, died 1504
- Thomas Wellys, collated 1504, resigned 1505
- Edmund Godyng, collated 1505, died 1507, the last prior.

The last five priors were appointed directly by the king for want of sufficient members of the community to hold elections.
