= Roger Eylove =

Roger Eylove may refer to:

- Roger Eylove (MP for Horsham) in 1395
- Roger Eylove (MP for Bletchingley) in 1414 and 1416
