= Henry Polsted =

16th-century English politician

Henry Polsted (by 1510 – 10 December 1555) of Albury, Surrey, was an English politician.

== Family ==
Henry was the brother of MP for Great Bedwyn, Thomas Polsted.

On 18 May 1539, Henry married Alice Lord at St Mary-le-Bow, London. The couple had one child, Richard Polsted, who went on to be MP for Hindon.

== Career ==
By 1533, Polsted had entered the service of Thomas Cromwell, whom he would serve in various roles until 1540. During this time, Polsted purchased ownership of Bicknacre Priory for £540, as a part of the dissolution of the monasteries.

Polsted went on to be a Member (MP) of the Parliament of England for Bletchingley in 1547 and October 1553, and for Guildford in November 1554 and 1555. He may also have served in the parliaments of 1536 and/or 1539, but the records of that time are incomplete.
