= John atte Wyke =

John atte Wyke (fl.1373–1386), of Bletchingley, Surrey, was an English Member of Parliament (MP).

He was a Member of the Parliament of England for Bletchingley in 1373, February 1383, October 1383, April 1384, November 1384 and 1386.
