= Henry Stone (disambiguation) =

Henry Stone (1921–2014) was an American record producer and founder of TK Records.

Henry Stone may also refer to:

- Henry Stone (painter) (1616–1653), English painter
- Henry Stone, 1887 mayor of Shire of Hinchinbrook
- Henry Stone (comedian) (born 1988), Australian comedian, writer, and director
- Henry Stone, a fictional character in The Fugitive
- Henry Stone (judoka) (1901–1956), American judo pioneer
- Henry Stone (1853–1909), 19th-century member and speaker of the Iowa House of Representatives
- Henry Stone (born 1971), 21st-century member of the Iowa House of Representatives

== See also ==
- Henry atte Stone (disambiguation)
