= John Deubeneye =

English MP

John Deubeneye (fl.1390s), was an English Member of Parliament (MP).

He was a Member of the Parliament of England for Bletchingley in January 1390, September 1397 and 1399.
