= William Bart =

English Member of Parliament (fl.1380–1386)

William Bart (fl. 1380–1386), was an English Member of Parliament (MP).

He was a Member of the Parliament of England for Bletchingley in January 1380, 1381 and 1386.
