= Matthew Russell (MP) =

English land owner

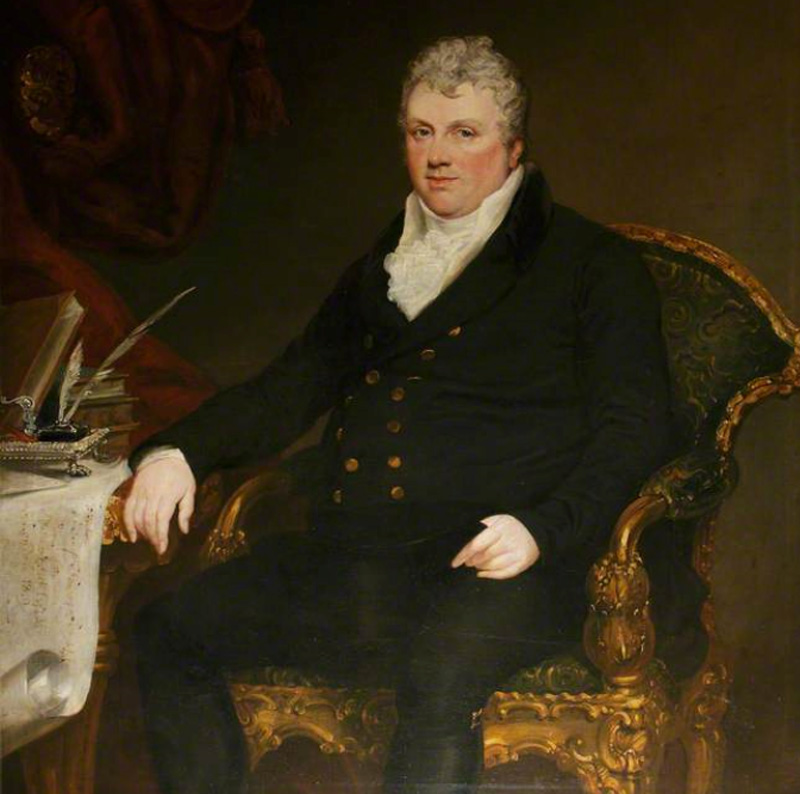
Matthew Russell, 1819 portrait

Matthew Russell (1765 – 8 May 1822) of Brancepeth Castle was an English landowner and coal proprietor, inheriting from his father William Russell a large fortune. He went into politics, first as a Pittite Tory, holding the Saltash seat in parliament for the last 20 years of his life, with one short break.

== Life ==
He was the son of William Russell of Sunderland and his wife Mary Harrison. He matriculated at University College, Oxford in 1781.

== Political career ==
Russell's career in national politics began with a defeat in 1800, a by-election loss to the Whig Michael Angelo Taylor at City of Durham. At first he intended to stand again there, but he had campaigned against the "Lambton and Tempest interests", and a coalition between Sir Henry Vane-Tempest, 2nd Baronet, and Ralph John Lambton looked set to exclude him from the two-member constituency.

For the 1802 general election, William Russell made a deal with the Buller family, for the nomination to a seat at Saltash, in Cornwall. Matthew was one of the two members elected in 1802. Some months after the 1806 general election the Ministry of All the Talents intervened, with the result that Russell and Arthur Champernowne were turned out of their seats in parliament in February 1807. At the general election in May of that year, Russell returned to parliament, and this was the only hiatus in his twenty-year tenure of the seat.

In 1815 William Russell bought a pocket borough in Surrey, Bletchingley, from the courtier William Kenrick. Matthew Russell had resisted offers from his father to move from the relatively certain seat at Saltash. After William Russell died in 1817, Matthew in the 1818 general election was returned for both Bletchingley and Saltash. At Bletchingley he made way for Sir William Curtis, 1st Baronet, backed by the Prince Regent. He also had at his disposal, in the two-member constituency, of a second seat. In 1818 it was taken by his father-in-law, George Tennyson, as placeholder. In 1819 it went to another Tory, Marquess of Titchfield, backed by William Huskisson.

From late 1817, Russell also involved himself in the venal Great Grimsby constituency, on the basis that he would buy votes for his brother-in-law Charles Tennyson. An initial plan to keep the two-member constituency in the family, involving Gordon Drummond who was married to his sister Margaret, had to be dropped. Given a free hand by Russell, Tennyson tried a number of combinations but could not come to terms with the Liverpool ministry for a partner in the 1818 general election, rejecting Charles Belson at a late point. He was elected, with the Whig John Nicholas Fazakerley topping him in the poll. In the 1820 general election caused by the death of George III, Tennyson first suggested to Russell that the second seat could be for Russell's son William; whom Russell considered too young. Then Tennyson, based on local advice, made a decision on William Duncombe of Duncombe Park and together they broke the hold of the Whig "Blue" faction, with both seats.

== Brancepeth Castle ==
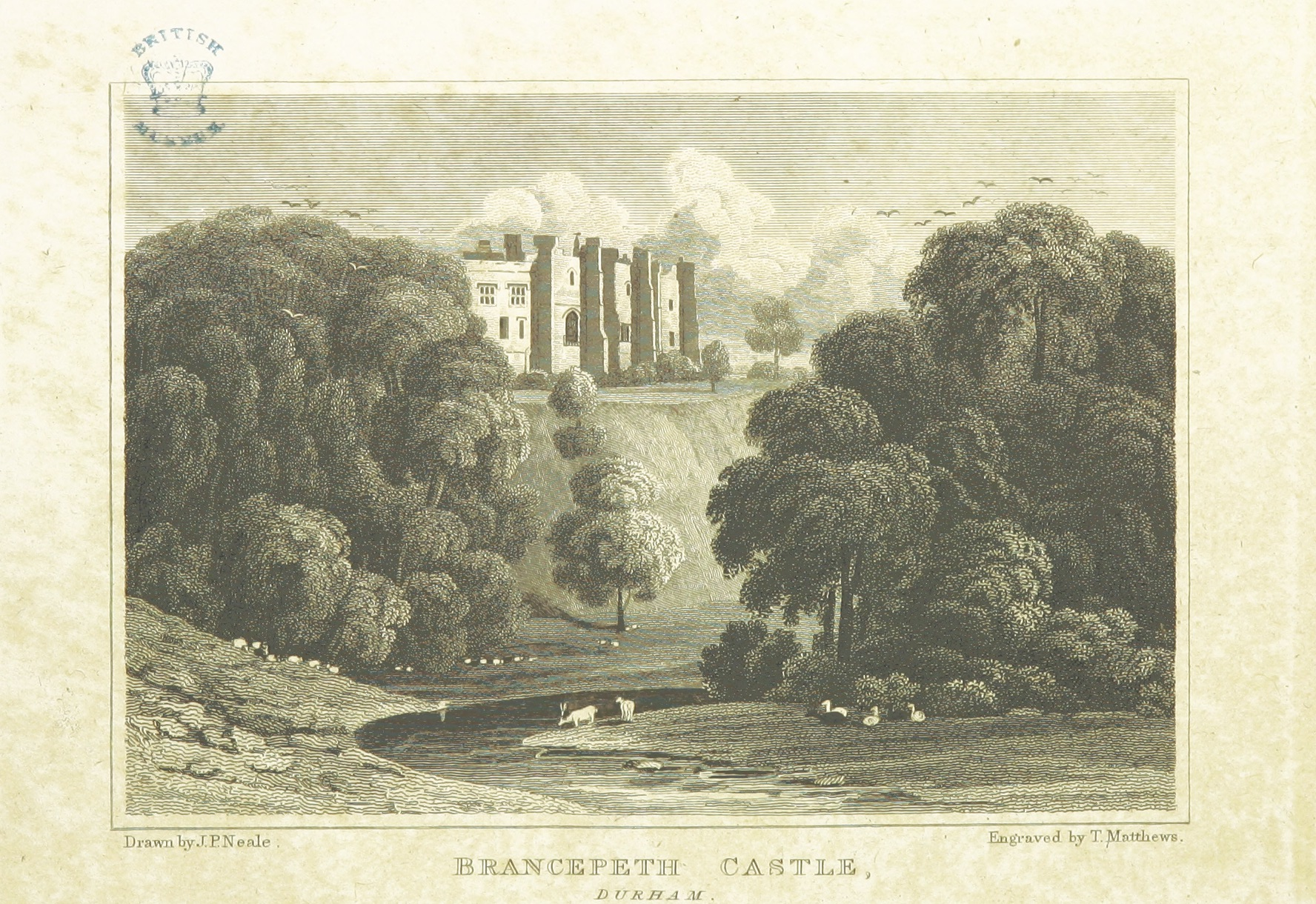
Brancepeth Castle, 1818 engraving

After his father's death, Russell inherited property including houses and Brancepeth Castle. He and his wife Elizabeth began spending heavily on the castle, at a rate estimated as £80,000 per annum. His Tennyson in-laws considered that Russell was hoping for elevation to the House of Lords. The castle is supposed to have inspired work at Bayons Manor, a Tennyson home.

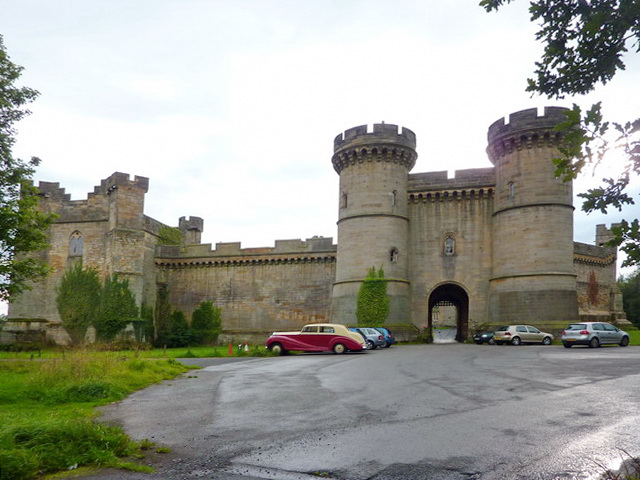
Brancepeth Castle, gatehouse, 2011 photograph

As his architect, Russell brought in John Paterson to work on the castle. Pevsner and Williamson consider that the gatehouse with round towers is probably modelled on a sketch by Robert Adam of the Fortezza Medicea at Volterra.

Russell took advice from Elizabeth's brother Charles Tennyson. There was stained glass by Charles Muss, working for William Collins & Co.

== Death ==
Matthew Russell died on 8 May 1822, at Long's Hotel, Bond Street, London.

== Family ==
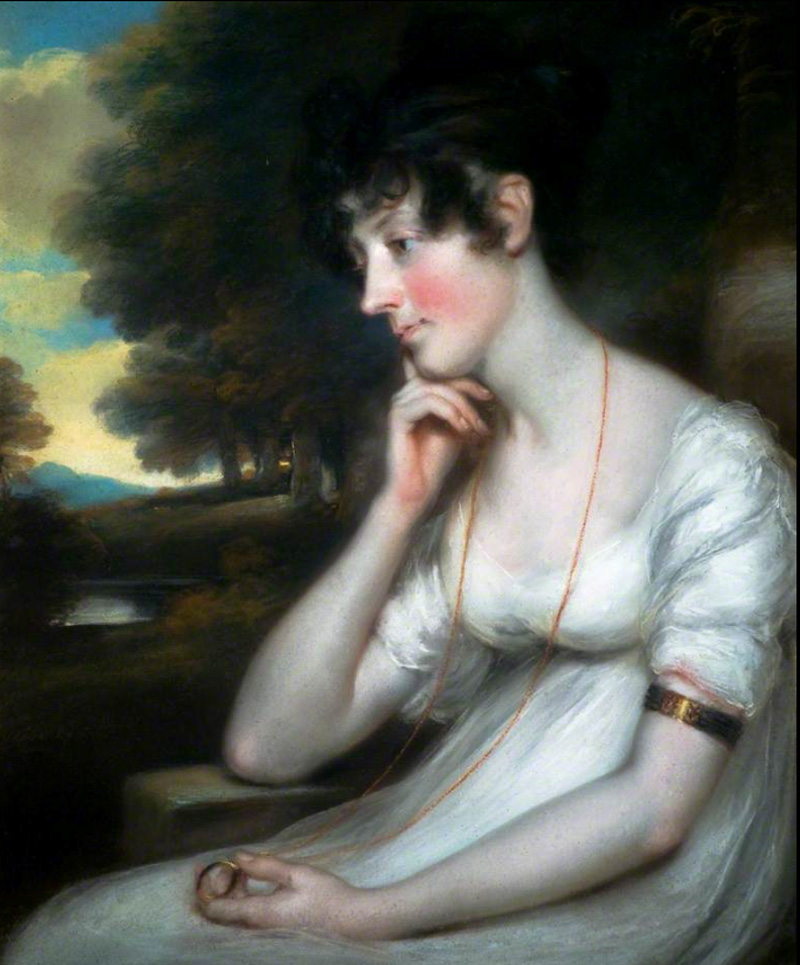
Elizabeth Russell, wife of Matthew Russell

Russell married in 1798 Elizabeth Tennyson, daughter of George Tennyson. They had one daughter and one son, William Russell. The daughter Emma Maria (1809–1870) married in 1828 Gustavus Frederick Hamilton-Russell, 7th Viscount Boyne (1797–1870). Through her, Brancepeth Castle became part of the Boyne estate. Elizabeth died in 1865, aged 89.

After the marriage, the couple's residence was Hardwick(e) House, Sedgefield.

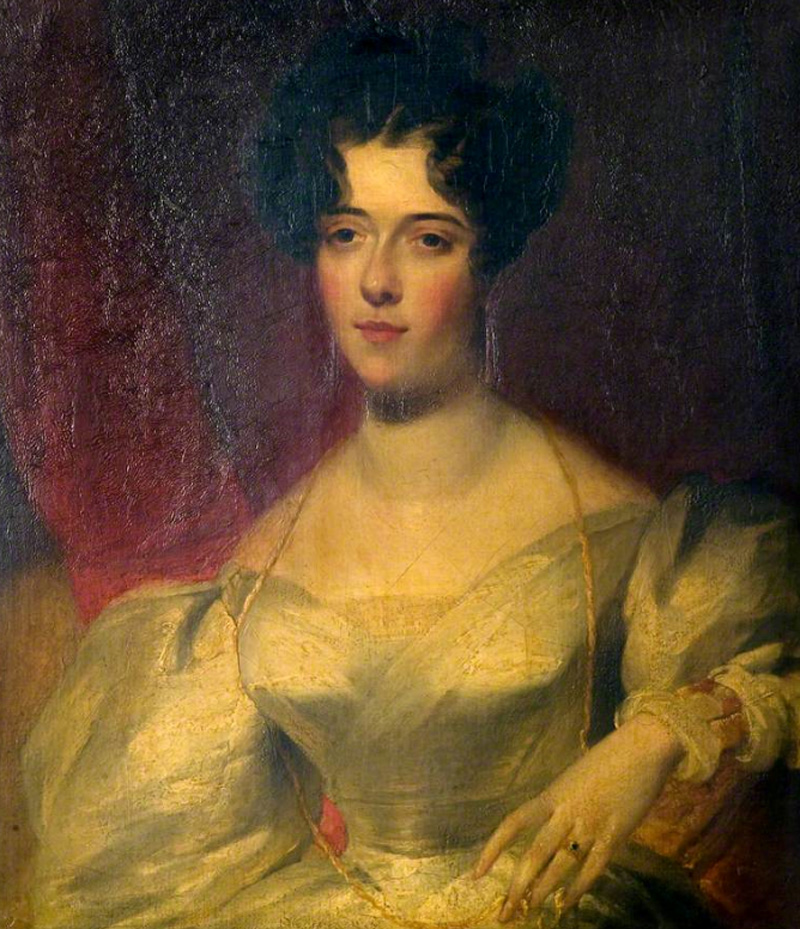
Emma Maria Russell, Viscountess Boyne, portrait
