= William Porter (died c. 1593) =

16th-century English politician

William Porter (by 1526 – 1592/93?) was an English politician.

He was a member (MP) of the parliament of England for Grantham in 1555, Bletchingley in 1559 and Helston in 1563.
