= Richard Turner (MP for Bletchingley) =

Richard Turner (fl. 1390s), was an English Member of Parliament (MP).

He was a Member of the Parliament of England for Bletchingley in 1393 and January 1397.
