= Jason Isaacs (singer) =

English singer and songwriter

- Born: 3 October 1967 (age 58); Killingworth, Northumberland, England
- Genres: Big band, swing, traditional pop, jazz, blues
- Occupations: Singer, songwriter, actor
- Instruments: Saxophone, vocals
- Years active: 1996–present
- Labels: Decca, On the Rocks Music
- Website: thejasonisaacs.com

Jason Isaacs (born 3 October 1967) is an English singer and songwriter.

== Biography ==
He was born on 3 October 1967, in Killingworth, Northumberland where his parents still reside.

Isaacs was the first person to win the ITV1 Peoples Crooner of the Year competition in 2010, part of the Alan Titchmarsh Show.

They call him the North-East's (UK) 'Ambassador of Swing', also referred to as 'Britain's Answer to Michael Bublé'.

A self-taught saxophonist who in the late 1990s focused more on singing. Having spent more than ten years touring the world playing bars and clubs as far afield as Bangkok, Switzerland and New York City, he settled back in his hometown to set down roots and develop his career. His first album, Fever was self-released in 2009. He found some commercial success with his first single, a cover of the Irving Berlin classic "Let's Face the Music and Dance" in Autumn 2010 following ITV1's 'UK Crooner of the Year' competition on the Alan Titchmarsh Show. The prize included the recording at Abbey Road Studios. The single, released by Decca, a division of Universal Records saw some chart success and several sell-out tours, most notably at Newcastle City Hall and at the Edinburgh Festival at the famous Assembly Hall. Decca's head of A&R Tom Lewis described him as having "the voice of Dean Martin, the looks of George Clooney and the swagger of Robbie Williams."

This was not Isaacs' first brush with TV talent shows, having made it as far as bootcamp on the X Factor in 2005.

Isaacs toured constantly with his big band The Ambassadors of Swing, with guest vocalists including Faye Tozer of pop group Steps, as well as the Fenner Sisters and more recently Steve Norman of Spandau Ballet.

Isaacs is a keen cricketer and plays for the Old Record Players Cricket Club based in Newcastle upon Tyne.
