= William Hart (MP) =

English MP (fl. 1388–1417)

William Hart (fl.1388-1417), was an English Member of Parliament (MP).

He was a Member of the Parliament of England for Bletchingley in September 1388, 1393, 1395, January 1397, 1402, November 1414, 1415 and 1417.
