= Josias Porcher =

British politician

Josias Du Pré Porcher (ca. 1761 – 4 May 1820) was an English politician. After following his uncle into the service of the British East India Company, he became wealthy and returned to England, although he was frustrated in an attempt to obtain a directorship of the company. His wealth and his friendship with Lord Caledon enabled him to sit in Parliament for various boroughs until 1818, although he was not a particularly conspicuous member. He died at his country home in Devonshire in 1820.

== Childhood and Indian career ==
Born about 1761, Josias was the third son of Paul Porcher, a planter of Charleston, South Carolina, and his wife Esther Du Pré. Esther was the sister of Josias Du Pré, an East India merchant. Porcher moved to England in 1768 under the patronage of his uncle Josias, who was President of Madras from 1770 to 1773. Porcher not unnaturally took up a career in India as well, and became a writer of the British East India Company in Madras in 1778. He received a legacy of £1,000 at the death of his uncle in 1780. (Note: History of Parliament says he inherited in 1778, but cites a source consistent with the death of his uncle in 1780.)

From 1783 to 1786, he was deputy to the deputy paymaster in Madras, and in 1785, was made a senior merchant. In 1790, he was appointed to the company's Board of Trade and was made clerk to the committee of works. Porcher served as mayor of Madras from 1791 to 1792 and was appointed military storekeeper at Madras in the latter year.

Porcher returned home in 1796, bearing a diamond sword presented by the nawab of Arcot to the Prince of Wales. He invested £2,000 in the 1797 loyalty loan. Porcher sought to become a director of the East India Company with the aid of the Alexander family, who had achieved prominence through a fortune also made in India. His uncle Josias had married Rebecca Alexander, sister of James Alexander, 1st Earl of Caledon, and aunt of Caledon's nephews Henry and James. Henry, a schoolmate of Porcher's, recommended him to Thomas Pelham as a friend of the family, and Porcher assured Pelham of his attachment to government and his friendship with Lord Hobart. However, Porcher did not receive a directorship, and later joined James Alexander and Edward Fletcher as partners in founding Porcher & Co., a firm of East India agents in 1804.

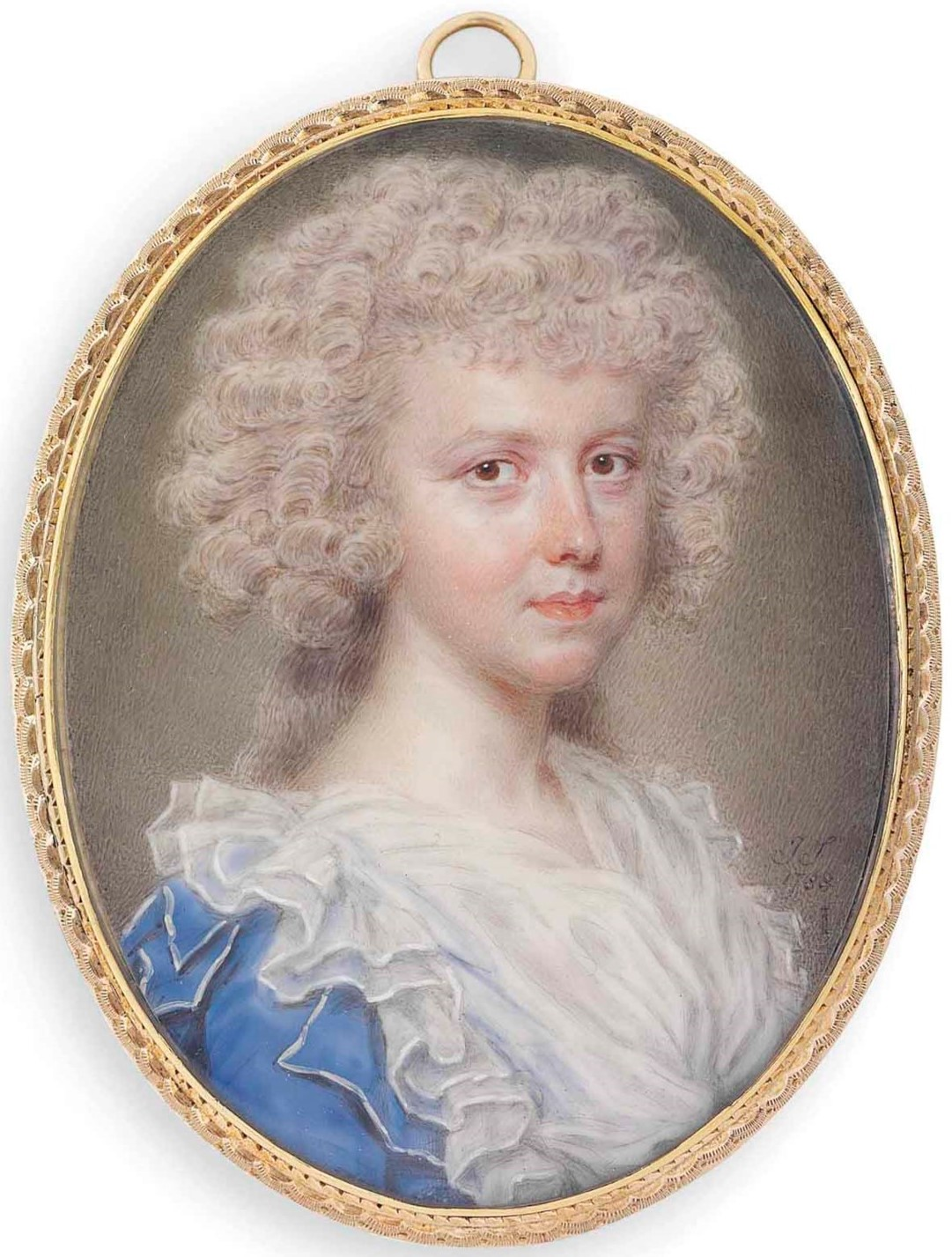
Portrait of Charlotte Burnaby by John Smart, 1788

== In Parliament ==
In 1802, he loaned £25,000 to Thomas Pitt, 2nd Baron Camelford, for six years in exchange for a Parliamentary seat, and was duly returned for Pitt's borough of Bodmin. In the same year, he also brokered the purchase of the burgages of Old Sarum from Camelford by Du Pré Alexander, 2nd Earl of Caledon. He was Member of Parliament for Bletchingley from 1806 to 1807, for Dundalk in 1807, and for Old Sarum from 1807 to 1818.

He was a Gentleman of the Privy Chamber from 1818 to his death in 1820. He married, on 1 Nov. 1787 at Fort George, Madras, Charlotte, the daughter of Admiral Sir William Burnaby, 1st Baronet, of Broughton Hall, Oxfordshire. They had 4 sons and a daughter.

== Notes ==
Parliament of the United Kingdom
Preceded by Sir John Morshead, Bt; Charles Shaw-Lefevre	Member of Parliament for Bodmin; 1802–1806; With: John Sargent 1802–1806; James Topping August – November 1806	Succeeded by Davies Giddy; William Wingfield
Preceded by Nicholas Ridley-Colborne; Sir John Benn Walsh, Bt	Member of Parliament for Bletchingley; 1806–1807; With: William Kenrick	Succeeded by William Kenrick; John Alexander Bannerman
Preceded by John Metge	Member of Parliament for Dundalk; January – May 1807	Succeeded by Patrick Crawford Bruce
Preceded by The Lord Blayney; Nicholas Vansittart	Member of Parliament for Old Sarum; 1807–1818; With: Nicholas Vansittart 1807–1812; James Alexander 1812–1818	Succeeded by James Alexander; Arthur Johnston Crawford
