= Walter atte Berne =

English politician (died 1425)

Walter atte Berne (died 1425) was an English politician. He sat as MP for Bletchingley in May 1421, and 1423.

He also served as rent collector in Bletchingley manor from September 1397 till 1398.
