= Robert Nafferton =

Robert Nafferton (fl.1377-1388), was an English Member of Parliament (MP).

He was a Member of the Parliament of England for Bletchingley in January 1377, October 1377, October 1383, 1385 and February 1388.
