= John Hawarde =

English politician

John Hawarde or Hayward (c. 1571–1631) of Tandridge Hall, Surrey, was an English politician. He was a Member of the Parliament of England for Bletchingley in 1621 and 1624, a member of the Inner Temple and a student at Christ's College, Cambridge.
