= Henry atte Stone (fl.1421) =

15th-century English politician

Henry atte Stone (fl. 1421) was an English politician.

He was a member (MP) of the parliament of England for Bletchingley in December 1421.
