= Killingworth Village =

Village in Tyne and Wear, England

Coordinates: 55.035°N 1.567°W

- Location within Tyne and Wear
- OS grid reference: NZ2870
- Metropolitan borough: North Tyneside
- Metropolitan county: Tyne and Wear
- Region: North East
- Country: England
- Sovereign state: United Kingdom
- Post town: NEWCASTLE UPON TYNE
- Postcode district: NE12
- Dialling code: 0191
- Police: Northumbria
- Fire: Tyne and Wear
- Ambulance: North East
- UK Parliament: North Tyneside

Killingworth Village is a small village in the borough of North Tyneside in the United Kingdom. It lies between Forest Hall to the south and the modern Killingworth, which derives its name from the village, to the north. The West Lane runs through the village from Forest Hall and on to Backworth. For local government, it is located within Killingworth ward.

== St John's Church ==
Until the mid nineteenth century the village was part of Longbenton parish, but became a parish in its own right in 1865. Four years later, in 1869, Killingworth parish church was built; it was designed by London architect Bassett Keeling, and named St John's after John the Evangelist. The walls are built of sandstone, adorned with red bands, and the roof is Welsh slate. The building cost £2032 (or roughly £250,000 in 2021 sterling). It was inaugurated on 28 December 1869, one day after St John's feast day.

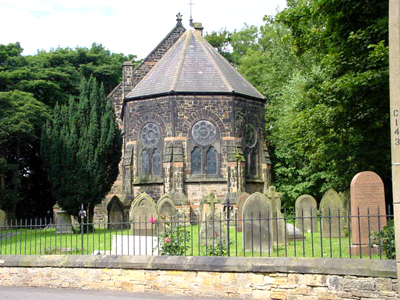
St John's Church - 7 May 2006

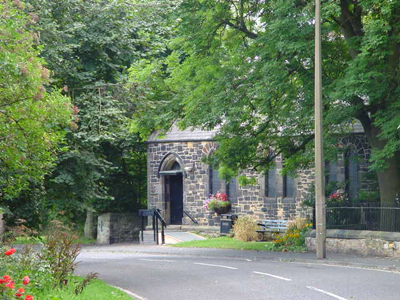
St John's Community Hall - 7 May 2006

== Public houses ==
There are two pubs in Killingworth Village: the Plough and the Killingworth Arms. The two establishments are a mere two hundred and fifty metres apart. Killingworth Arms Football Club is a Sunday league team, in the North East Sunday Football League Division D.

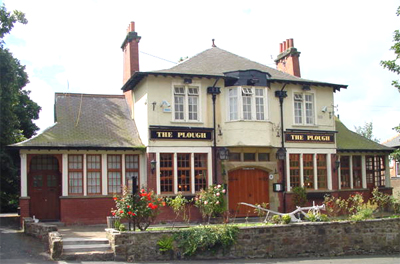
Plough - 7 May 2006

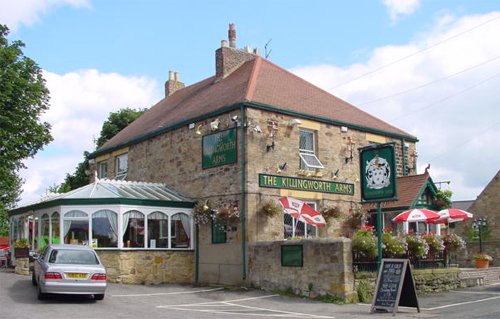
Killingworth Arms - 7 May 2006
