= William Tanner (MP for Bletchingley) =

William Tanner (fl. 1395), was an English Member of Parliament (MP).

He was a Member of the Parliament of England for Bletchingley in 1395.
