= Henry atte Stone (fl.1388) =

14th-century English politician

Henry Atte Stone (fl. 1388) was an English politician.

He was a member (MP) of the parliament of England for Bletchingley in September 1388.
