= William Nightingale (MP) =

English politician

William Nightingale was an English politician.

Nightingale was a Member of the Parliament of England for Bletchingley a rather small town borough in the occasional royal Parliaments of 1382, 1388 and 1390.
