= John Alexander Bannerman =

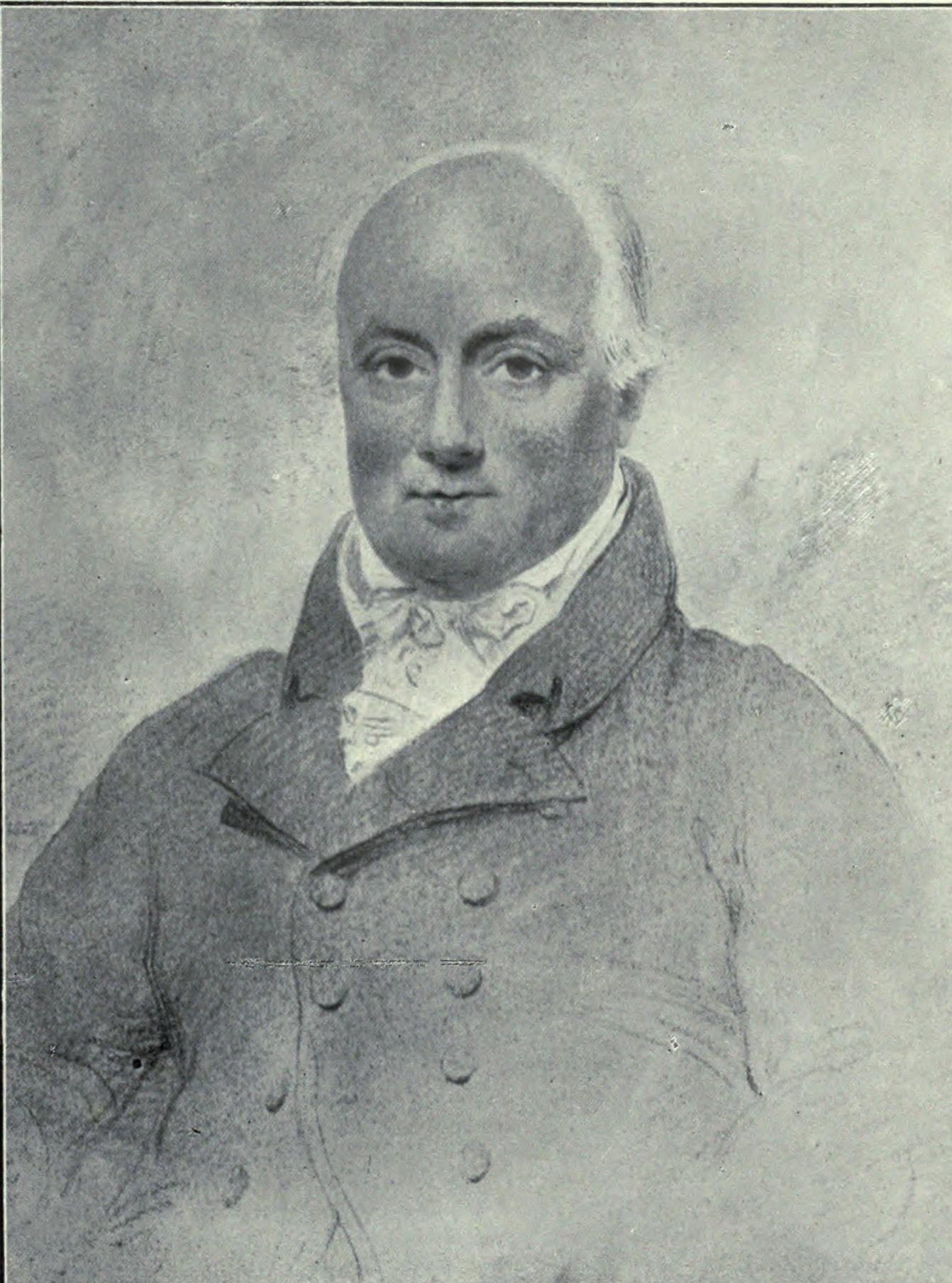
- John Alexander Bannerman

Personal details
- Born: 5 June 1759 Fort St George, Madras, India
- Died: 8 August 1819 (aged 60) Penang, Malaysia
- Resting place: Old Protestant Cemetery, George Town

Colonel John Alexander Bannerman (5 June 1759 – 8 August 1819) was appointed Governor of Prince of Wales' Island (Penang Island, Malaysia) and Province Wellesley (Seberang Perai) (both forming the settlement of Penang) in 1817 and also Treasurer from 1818.

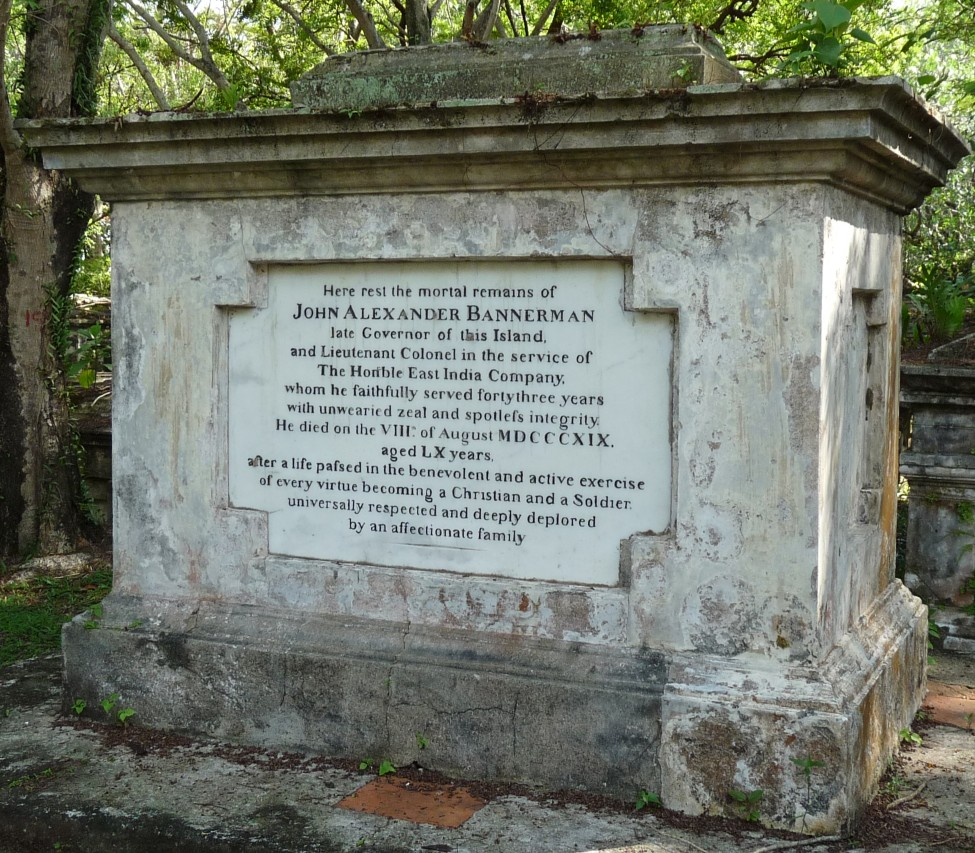
His tomb at the Old Protestant Cemetery, George Town

Bannerman hoped to enter Parliament at the 1806 general election, but despite being prepared to spend £2,000 on a campaign, he failed to find a seat. However, a vacancy was created in early 1807 the resignation of Josias Porcher, MP for the pocket borough of Bletchingley which was then under the patronage of Rev. Jarvis Kenrick, and Bannerman was returned at the by-election in January 1807. He hoped to find a Treasury borough at the general election later that year, but was unsuccessful.

He was a director of the East India Company for two periods after 1811. Bannerman served until his death from cholera in 1819. He was assisted by council member John MacAlister. Bannerman is buried at the Old Protestant Cemetery, George Town.

Parliament of the United Kingdom
| Preceded by Josias Porcher; William Kenrick | Member of Parliament for Bletchingley; January 1807 – May 1807; With: William Kenrick | Succeeded by Thomas Freeman-Heathcote; William Kenrick |
