= Roger Eylove (MP for Bletchingley) =

Member of the Parliament of England

Roger Eylove was a Member of Parliament for Bletchingley in November 1414 and March 1416. His son was the MP, Thomas Eylove.
