= Brancepeth Castle =

Castle in County Durham, England

- Brancepeth
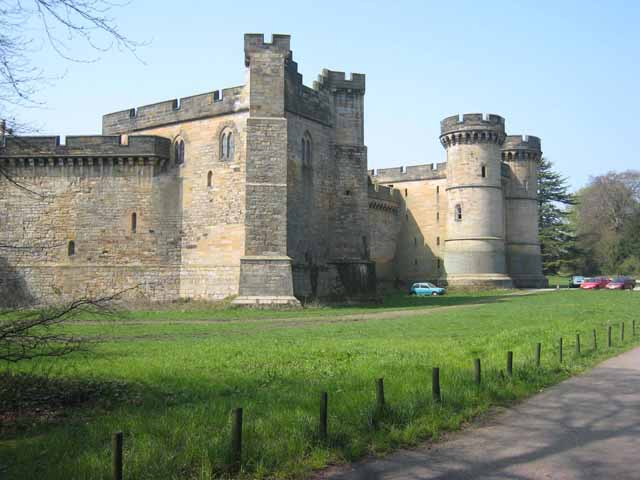
- Brancepeth Castle from the east, showing the two 19th-century gate towers (right) and older chapel and curtain walls (centre and left)

Site information
- Owner: Dobson family
- Open to the public: In part, throughout the year.
- Condition: Standing
- Website: https://www.brancepethcastle.org.uk/

Location
- Location in County Durham
- Coordinates: 54.73333°N 1.65000°W

Site history
- Materials: Sandstone

Brancepeth Castle is a castle in the village of Brancepeth in County Durham, England, some 5 miles south-west of the city of Durham (grid reference NZ223377). It is a Grade I listed building.

== History ==
A succession of buildings has been on the site. The first was a Norman castle built by the Bulmers, which was rebuilt by the Nevilles in the late 14th century. For many years the castle was owned by the Neville family until in 1569 it was confiscated by the Crown following the family's involvement in the Rising of the North.

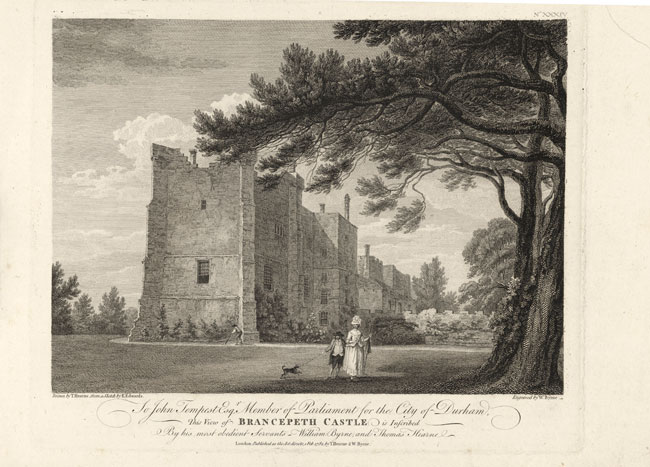
Engraving of Brancepeth Castle in 1782, before its 19th-century expansion

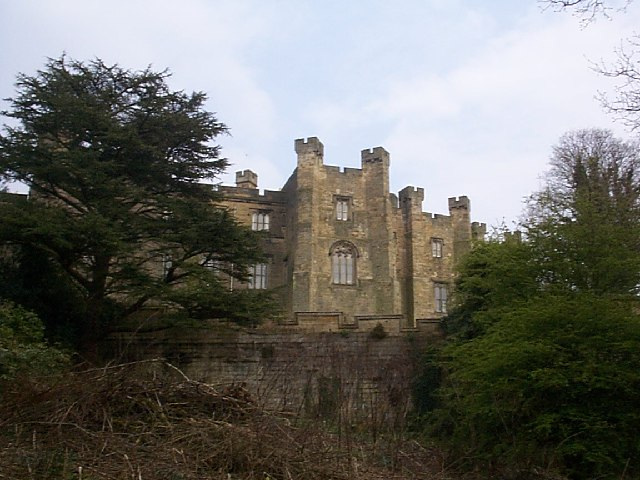
West side of the castle. The 19th-century addition to an older section of the castle can be seen below the left turret. In the foreground is Japanese knotweed.

There have been a number of other owners since that time. In the early 17th century, the estate was granted by the Crown to Robert Carr, 1st Earl of Somerset, from whom it subsequently confiscated the castle back due to his involvement in a poisoning scandal. In 1636, three men who had bought the castle from the King's Commissioners in 1633 sold it to Ralph Cole of Newcastle. His grandson, Sir Ralph Cole, 2nd Baronet, sold the property on 9 April 1701 to Sir Henry Belaysyse, whose daughter was involved with Bobby Shafto and who was said to have inspired the famous song.

In 1796 the castle was acquired by William Russell (1734–1818) of Newbottle near Sunderland, a wealthy banker and mine owner. His son Matthew Russell (1765–1822), Member of Parliament for Saltash in 1818, in the 1820s spent lavishly on the Castle's reconstruction. The present building is largely his work, to the designs of the architect John Paterson, and then improved in the mid-19th century by Anthony Salvin for William Russell, High Sheriff of Durham, in 1841.

During World War I the castle was used as a hospital by convalescents from Newcastle General Hospital. In 1939 it became the regimental headquarters for the Durham Light Infantry, who erected a military camp of over 100 huts to the south of the village during the Second World War. The Durham Light Infantry left the Castle in 1962.

== Dobson family ==
The castle is now owned by the Dobson family. Margaret Dobson, wife of publisher Dennis Dobson, bought the castle in 1978 to store the company's stock of books when the lease on its Notting Hill premises expired. Her husband died that year.

Margaret Dobson restored the fabric and interior of the building, including the lead roof, which had been stripped by an earlier tenant. She refurbished function rooms, for use as a venue for auctions and twice-yearly craft fairs. Shakespearean plays were staged in the main courtyard, and rooms were rented. Margaret Dobson died aged 86 on 19 October 2014, leaving four sons, three daughters and 11 grandchildren. Original French political posters from 1968 found in the cellar of the castle featured in the BBC programme Inside Out North East & Cumbria in February 2019.

== See also ==
- Castles in Great Britain and Ireland
- List of castles in England
