= William Kenrick (1774–1829) =

English lawyer and politician

William Kenrick (21 January 1774 – 22 October 1829) was an English lawyer and politician.

Kenrick was the eldest son of Rev Jarvis Kenrick and his wife, Dorothy, née Seward. He was educated at Trinity College, Cambridge and called to the bar in 1800 at the Middle Temple. In 1812 he married Frances Ann, daughter of Robert Mascall of Sussex; they had 1 son and 3 daughters.

He practised as a barrister on the home circuit and at Surrey sessions.

His paternal uncle was John Kenrick, who in 1779 purchased the patronage of the borough of Bletchingley in Surrey from their cousin Sir Robert Clayton. When John died in 1799, Jarvis Kenrick succeeded him in the patronage, and at the 1806 general election returned his son William as MP for Bletchingley.

In 1809 William inherited the patronage from his father, and continued to return himself to Parliament. He served as Master of the King's household from 1810 to 1812, and sat for Bletchingley until 1814, when he resigned his seat and in 1816 he sold the patronage of Bletchingley for £60,000. He then bought an estate near Dorking.

Parliament of the United Kingdom
Preceded by John Benn Walsh; Nicholas Ridley-Colborne	Member of Parliament for Bletchingley; 1806–1814; With: Josias Porcher 1806 – January 1807; John Alexander Bannerman January–May 1807; Thomas Freeman-Heathcote 1807–1809; Charles Cockerell 1809 – October 1812; Sir Charles Talbot, Bt October–December 1812; Robert Newman from December 1812	Succeeded by Robert Newman; John Bolland
Court offices
Preceded by Sir Henry Strachey, Bt	Master of the Household; 1810–1812	Succeeded by Samuel Hulse
