= Bletchingley (constituency) =

Parliamentary borough in Surrey, England

- Former borough constituency for the House of Commons
- County: Surrey
- Major settlements: Bletchingley

1295–1832
- Seats: Two
- Replaced by: East Surrey

Bletchingley was a parliamentary borough in Surrey. It returned two Members of Parliament (MPs) to the House of Commons of England from 1295 to 1707, to the House of Commons of Great Britain from 1707 to 1800, and to the House of Commons of the United Kingdom until 1832, when the constituency was abolished by the Great Reform Act.

Elections were held using the bloc vote system.

The constituency was just 3 1/2 miles south-east of the similar rotten borough of Gatton.

== History ==
Bletchingley was one of the original boroughs enfranchised in the Model Parliament, and kept its status until the Reform Act. The borough consisted of the former market town of Bletchingley in Surrey, which by the 19th century had shrunk to a village. In 1831, the population of the borough was 513, and it contained only 85 houses. It was a burgage borough: the right to vote was exercised by the owners or resident tenants of the 130 "burgage tenements". No doubt at some point in history these were simply the inhabited houses of the town, but it was already an artificial franchise by the time it was disputed before the House of Commons in 1624, when it was settled that Bletchingley's burgage holders should keep the vote as they had "time out of mind". By the 19th century of course, with more burgages in the borough than houses, the notion of its being a residential franchise was no more than a legal fiction.

Like other burgage boroughs, Bletchingley quickly fell into the hands of a single landowner who thereby had the safest of pocket boroughs. It was once the property of Henry VIII's rejected Queen, Anne of Cleves. From her it passed to Sir Thomas Cawarden, the Master of the Revels, and from his heir to Lord Howard of Effingham, father of the future conqueror of the Spanish Armada, in about 1560. It then remained in Howard hands for more than half a century, one of several boroughs controlled by that powerful family.

However, the 1624 dispute occurred when the voters daringly defied Lady Howard, and it may not have been entirely secure for any single "patron" for the rest of the century. By 1700, there were two rival influences: the Evelyns of Godstone, who had succeeded in holding one of the seats for much of the preceding sixty years, and Sir Robert Clayton, a London banker who was said to be the wealthiest commoner in England, and who was now Lord of the manor. Neither held a majority of the burgages, and there were still a fair number of independent voters. For some years, Evelyn and Clayton had to be content with choosing one MP each, and even then had to face some tightly contested votes, but after the accession of George I (1714), Clayton's nephew and heir, William Clayton, managed to accumulate enough of the burgages in his own hands to squeeze out the Evelyn influence and eventually make his hold absolutely watertight. Since the importance of a man with the absolute power to nominate two Members of Parliament was not underestimated by 18th century governments, he quickly found himself dignified with a baronetcy.

Parliamentary elections were held from 1733 in what is now the White Hart inn: a book in 1844 notes this and that eight to ten people voted, as well as a sale of the manor for £60,000 in 1816.

The Claytons retained Bletchingley until 1779. In that year, short of money and with talk of parliamentary reform in the air, Sir Robert Clayton decided to realise the asset while it still had a value, and sold the reversion of his property at Bletchingley (which by now included all the burgages) to his cousin, John Kenrick, for £10,000. Once the prospect of parliamentary reform had receded for the time being, Clayton repented of his bargain and filed an action in Chancery against Kenrick, claiming that he had been "imposed upon" and had been paid quite an inadequate amount; but the court sympathised with Kenrick, and dismissed the action with costs.

In 1816 (see above), Kenrick's son later sold the rights to William Russell for £60,000; and his grandson William Russell made seats available to some of the rising stars of the Whig party. They included two future Prime Ministers: Hon. William Lamb (Prime Minister as Lord Melbourne) and Lord Palmerston.

Bletchingley was abolished as a constituency by the Reform Act. From then on, the village was included in the Eastern division of Surrey.

== Members of Parliament ==
=== 1295–1640 ===
Parliament	First member	Second member
1386	William Bart	John atte Wyke
1388 (Feb)	Robert Nafferton	William Nightingale
1388 (Sep)	William Hart	Henry atte Stone I
1390 (Jan)	John Deubeneye	William Nightingale
1390 (Nov)		
1391		
1393	William Hart	Richard Turner
1394		
1395	William Hart	William Tanner
1397 (Jan)	William Hart	Richard Turner
1397 (Sep)	John Deubeneye	Thomas atte Helde
1399	John Deubeneye	Thomas atte Helde
1401		
1402	William Hart	John Modys
1404 (Jan)		
1404 (Oct)		
1407		
1410		
1411		
1413 (Feb)		
1413 (May)		
1414 (Apr)		
1414 (Nov)	William Hart	Roger Eylove
1415	William Hart	John Modys
1416 (Mar)	Roger Eylove	John Modys
1416 (Oct)		
1417	William Hart	Robert Axi (Note: History of Parliament Online provides no other information on this MP other than "unidentified".)
1419	Roger -?	John -?
1420		
1421 (May)	Walter atte Berne	John Knoller
1421 (Dec)	Henry Brampton	Henry atte Stone II
1422	Thomas Eylove	
1472	Henry Winter	
1491	William Fisher	Thomas Garth
1510–1523	No names known	
1529	Nicholas Leigh	John St John
1536	?	
1539	?	
1542	Thomas Cawarden	William Sackville
1545	?	
1547	Sir Thomas Cawarden, sat for Surrey replaced by Jan 1552 by Henry Polsted	John Cheke
1553 (Mar)	Sir John Cheke	Sir Maurice Berkeley
1553 (Oct)	Henry Polsted	Matthew Colthurst
1554 (Apr)	John Harman	Nicholas Saunders
1554 (Nov)	Humphrey Cholmley	Robert Freeman
1555	John Vaughan	William Smethwick
1558	Bertram Calthorpe	Roger Alford
1558–9	John Brace	William Porter
1562–3	John Coker	John Elsedon
1571	Roeland Maynard	Richard Bostock
1572	Thomas Browne	Henry Kenrick, died and replaced Nov 1579 by Richard Bostock
1584	Richard Bostock	John Cox
1586	Sir Thomas Browne	John Cox
1588	Richard Bostock	John Cox
1593	Julius Caesar	Stephen Riddlesden
1597	Lord Howard of Effingham, sat for Surrey replaced by Sir Richard Trevor	John Trevor
1601	John Turner	Bostock Fuller
1604	Sir John Trevor	Richard Bellingham died and replaced by Sir Charles Howard
1614	Sir John Trevor	Sir Charles Howard
1621–1622	John Hayward	Henry Lovell
1624	Sir Miles Fleetwood sat for Launceston, replaced by Edward Bysshe the elder	John Hayward
1625	Edward Bysshe the elder	Thomas Gresham
1626	Edward Bysshe the elder	Henry Lovell
1628	Sir Edward Bishopp, 2nd Baronet	John Evelyn, senior
1629–1640	No Parliaments summoned	

=== 1640–1832 ===
Year	First member	First party	Second member	Second party
April 1640	Edmiund Hoskins		Edward Bysshe the elder	
November 1640	John Evelyn, senior	Parliamentarian	Edward Bysshe the younger	Parliamentarian
December 1648	Evelyn and Bysshe excluded in Pride's Purge: both seats vacant			
1653	Bletchingley was unrepresented in the Barebones Parliament and the First and Second Parliaments of the Protectorate.			
January 1659	John Goodwin		Edmund Hoskins	
May 1659	Not represented in the restored Rump			
April 1660	John Evelyn, senior		John Goodwin	
1661	Sir William Hawarde		Edward Bysshe	
February 1679	George Evelyn		Edward Harvey	
October 1679	George Evelyn		John Morris	
1681	George Evelyn		Sir William Goulston	
1685	Ambrose Browne		Sir Marmaduke Gresham	
January 1689	Thomas Howard		John Glyd	
December 1689	Thomas Howard		Jeffrey Amherst	
1690	Thomas Howard		Sir Robert Clayton	Whig
1695	Thomas Howard		Maurice Thompson	
1698	Hugh Hare		Sir Robert Clayton	Whig
1701	Sir Edward Gresham		John Ward	
July 1702	John Evelyn		John Ward	
December 1702	Sir Robert Clayton	Whig	John Ward	
1705	George Evelyn		John Ward	
1708	George Evelyn		Thomas Onslow	
1715	George Evelyn		(Sir) William Clayton (Note: Created a baronet in January 1732.)	
1724	Henry Herbert		(Sir) William Clayton	
1727	Sir Orlando Bridgeman	Whig	(Sir) William Clayton	
1734	(Sir) Kenrick Clayton (Note: Succeeded to his baronetcy in December 1744.)		(Sir) William Clayton	
1745	(Sir) Kenrick Clayton		William Clayton	
1761	(Sir) Kenrick Clayton		(Sir) Charles Whitworth (Note: Knighted 1768.)	
1768	(Sir) Kenrick Clayton		(Sir) Robert Clayton	
1769	Frederick Standert		(Sir) Robert Clayton	
1780	John Kenrick		(Sir) Robert Clayton	
1783	John Kenrick		John Nicholls	
1787	John Kenrick		(Sir) Robert Clayton	
1790	Philip Francis		(Sir) Robert Clayton	
1796	Sir Lionel Copley (Note: Copley was also elected for Tregony, which he chose to represent, and never sat for Bletchingley.)		John Stein	
1797	Benjamin Hobhouse		John Stein	
1802	James Milnes		John Benn Walsh	
1805	Nicholas Ridley-Colborne		John Benn Walsh	
1806	Josias Porcher		William Kenrick	
January 1807	John Alexander Bannerman		William Kenrick	
May 1807	Thomas Freeman-Heathcote		William Kenrick	
1809	Charles Cockerell		William Kenrick	
October 1812	Sir Charles Talbot		William Kenrick	
December 1812	Robert Newman		William Kenrick	
1814	Robert Newman		John Bolland	
1818	Matthew Russell	Whig	George Tennyson	Whig
February 1819	Sir William Curtis	Tory	George Tennyson	Whig
February 1819	Sir William Curtis	Tory	Marquess of Titchfield	Whig
1820	Edward Henry Edwardes		Marquess of Titchfield	Whig
1822	Edward Henry Edwardes		Lord Francis Leveson-Gower	Tory
1826	William Russell	Whig	Charles Tennyson	Whig
1827	Hon. William Lamb	Whig	Charles Tennyson	Whig
1828	William Ewart	Whig	Charles Tennyson	Whig
1830	Robert William Mills	Whig	Charles Tennyson	Whig
February 1831	Sir William Horne	Whig	Charles Tennyson	Whig
April 1831	Hon. John Ponsonby	Whig	Charles Tennyson	Whig
July 1831	Thomas Hyde Villiers	Whig	Viscount Palmerston	Whig
1832	Constituency abolished			

== Election results ==
=== Elections in the 1830s ===
By-election, 18 July 1831: Bletchingley
Party	Candidate	Votes	%
Whig	Thomas Hyde Villiers	Unopposed	
Whig	Henry John Temple	Unopposed	
Registered electors		c. 70	
Whig hold			
Whig hold			

- Caused by Ponsonby's resignation and Tennyson's decision to sit for Stamford, where he had also been elected.

General election, 29 April 1831: Bletchingley
Party	Candidate	Votes	%
Whig	John Ponsonby	Unopposed	
Whig	Charles Tennyson	Unopposed	
Registered electors		c. 70	
Whig hold			
Whig hold			

By-election, 18 February 1831: Bletchingley
Party	Candidate	Votes	%
Whig	William Horne	Unopposed	
Registered electors		c. 70	
Whig hold			

- Caused by Mills' resignation

By-election, 10 January 1831: Bletchingley
Party	Candidate	Votes	%
Whig	Charles Tennyson	Unopposed	
Registered electors		c. 70	
Whig hold			

- Caused by Tennyson's appointment as Clerk of the Ordnance

General election, 30 July 1830: Bletchingley
Party	Candidate	Votes	%
Whig	Robert William Mills	Unopposed	
Whig	Charles Tennyson	Unopposed	
Whig hold			
Whig hold			
