= George Tennyson =

English Whig MP (1750-1835)

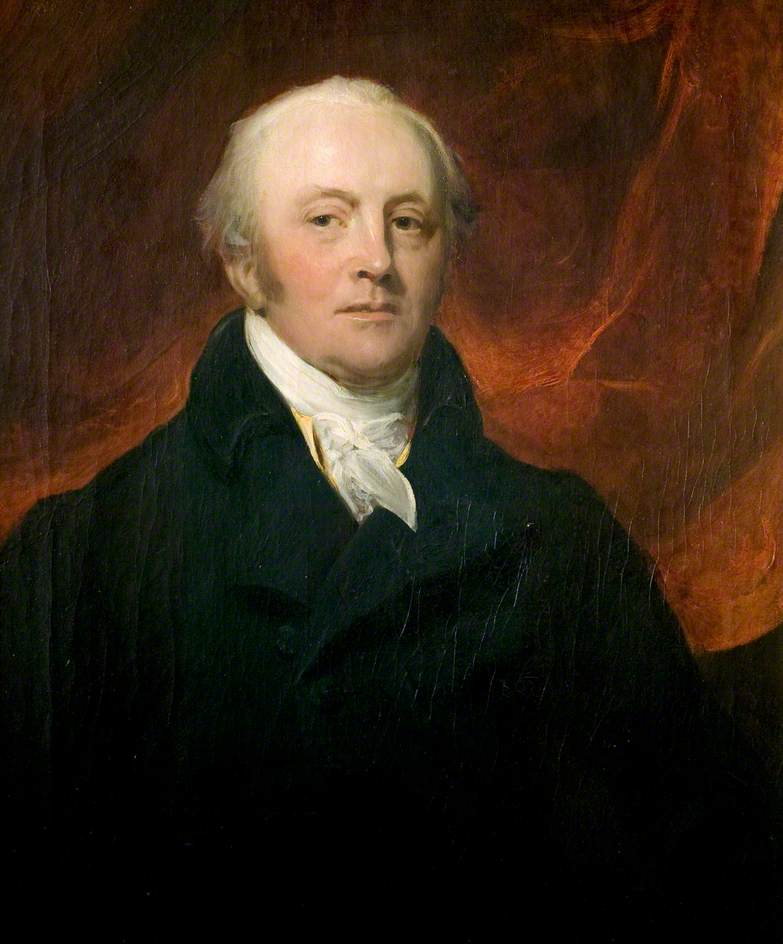

Member of Parliament for Bletchingley
- In office 15 June 1818 – 27 February 1819

Personal details
- Born: 7 January 1750
- Died: 4 July 1835 (aged 85)
- Party: Whig

George Tennyson (7 January 1750 – 4 July 1835) was an English politician. He served as a Member of Parliament (MP). In addition, he served as an attorney before inheriting the property and interests of his uncle, Christopher Clayton, in 1794.

== Family ==
Tennyson married Mary Turner and had the following children:

- George Clayton Tennyson
- Elizabeth Tennyson
- Mary Tennyson
- Charles Tennyson-d'Eyncourt

== See also ==
- List of MPs elected in the 1818 United Kingdom general election
