= Parliamentary constituencies in East Sussex =

The ceremonial county of East Sussex (which includes the unitary authority of Brighton and Hove) is divided into 9 parliamentary constituencies: 4 borough constituencies and 5 county constituencies, one of which crosses the county border with West Sussex.

== Constituencies ==
Conservative † Labour ‡ Liberal Democrat ¤ Green ♣

| Constituency (Note: BC denotes borough constituency, CC denotes county constituency.) | Electorate | Majority (Note: The majority is the number of votes the winning candidate receives more than their nearest rival.) | Member of Parliament | Nearest opposition | Electoral wards | Map |
|---|---|---|---|---|---|---|
| Bexhill and Battle CC | 72,209 | 2,657 | Kieran Mullan † | Christine Bayliss ‡ | Rother District Council: Bexhill Central, Bexhill Collington, Bexhill Kewhurst, Bexhill Old Town and Worsham, Bexhill Pebsham and St. Michaels, Bexhill Sackville, Bexhill St. Marks, Bexhill St. Stephens, Bexhill Sidley, Brede and Udimore, Burwash and the Weald, Catsfield and Crowhurst, Hurst Green and Ticehurst, North Battle, Netherfield and Whatlington, Northern Rother, Robertsbridge, Sedlescombe and Westfield, South Battle and Telham. Wealden District Council: Herstmonceux and Pevensey Levels, Pevensey Bay. | |
| Brighton Kemptown and Peacehaven BC | 68,784 | 9,609 | Chris Ward ‡ | Khobi Vallais † | Brighton and Hove City Council: East Brighton, Hanover and Elm Grove (polling district PHEA and polling district PHEF to the east of Queen's Park Road), Moulsecoomb and Bevendean, Queen's Park, Rottingdean Coastal, Woodingdean. Lewes District Council: East Saltdean and Telscombe Cliffs, Peacehaven East, Peacehaven North, Peacehaven West. | |
| Brighton Pavilion BC | 74,786 | 14,290 | Siân Berry ♣ | Tom Gray ‡ | Brighton and Hove City Council: Hanover and Elm Grove (polling districts PHEB, PHEC, PHED and PHEE, and polling district PHEF to the west of Queen’s Park Road), Hollingdean and Stanmer, Patcham, Preston Park, Regency, St Peter's and North Laine, Withdean. | |
| East Grinstead and Uckfield CC (part) | 75,385 | 8,480 | Mims Davies † | Benedict Dempsey ¤ | Lewes District Council: Chailey, Barcombe and Hamsey, Newick, Wivelsfield. Mid Sussex District Council: Ardingly and Balcombe, Ashurst Wood, Copthorne and Worth, Crawley Down and Turners Hill, East Grinstead Ashplats, East Grinstead Baldwins, East Grinstead Herontye, East Grinstead Imberhorne, East Grinstead Town, High Weald. Wealden District Council: Buxted, Danehill and Fletching, Forest Row, Maresfield, Uckfield East, Uckfield New Town, Uckfield North, Uckfield Ridgewood and Little Horsted. | |
| Eastbourne BC | 72,592 | 12,204 | Josh Babarinde ¤ | Caroline Ansell † | Eastbourne Borough Council: Devonshire, Hampden Park, Langney, Meads, Old Town, Ratton, St Anthony's, Sovereign, Upperton. | |
| Hastings and Rye CC | 75,939 | 8,653 | Helena Dollimore ‡ | Sally-Ann Hart † | Hastings Borough Council: Ashdown, Baird, Braybrooke, Castle, Central St Leonards, Conquest, Gensing, Hollington, Maze Hill, Old Hastings, Ore, Silverhill, St Helens, Tressell, West St Leonards, Wishing Tree. Rother District Council: Eastern Rother, Rye and Winchelsea, Southern Rother. | |
| Hove and Portslade BC | 74,063 | 19,881 | Peter Kyle ‡ | Sophie Broadbent ♣ | Brighton and Hove City Council: Brunswick and Adelaide, Central Hove, Goldsmid, Hangleton and Knoll, North Portslade, South Portslade, Westbourne, Wish. | |
| Lewes CC | 76,166 | 12,624 | James MacCleary ¤ | Maria Caulfield † | Lewes District Council: Ditchling and Westmeston, Kingston, Lewes Bridge, Lewes Castle, Lewes Priory, Newhaven North, Newhaven South, Ouse Valley and Ringmer, Plumpton, Streat, East Chiltington and St. John, Seaford Central, Seaford East, Seaford North, Seaford South, Seaford West. Wealden District Council: Arlington, Lower Willingdon, Polegate Central, Polegate North, Polegate South and Willingdon Watermill, South Downs, Stone Cross, Upper Willingdon. | |
| Sussex Weald CC | 72,897 | 6,842 | Nus Ghani † | Danielle Newson ¤ | Wealden District Council: Chiddingly, East Hoathly and Waldron, Crowborough Central, Crowborough Jarvis Brook, Crowborough North, Crowborough St. Johns, Crowborough South East, Crowborough South West, Framfield and Cross-in-Hand, Frant and Wadhurst, Hadlow Down and Rotherfield, Hailsham Central, Hailsham East, Hailsham North, Hailsham North West, Hailsham South, Hailsham West, Hartfield, Heathfield North, Heathfield South, Hellingly, Horam and Punnetts Town, Mayfield and Five Ashes, Withyham. | |

== Boundary changes ==
=== 2010 ===
Under the fifth periodic review of Westminster constituencies, the Boundary Commission for England decided to retain the existing 8 constituencies in East Sussex, with minor changes to realign constituency boundaries with those of current local government wards, and to reduce the electoral disparity between constituencies.

| Name | Boundaries 1997-2010 | Boundaries 2010–2024 |
|---|---|---|
| 1. Bexhill and Battle CC; 2. Brighton, Kemptown BC; 3. Brighton, Pavilion BC; 4. Eastbourne BC; 5. Hastings and Rye CC; 6. Hove BC; 7. Lewes CC; 8. Wealden CC | Parliamentary constituencies in East Sussex | Proposed Revision |

=== 2024 ===
See 2023 periodic review of Westminster constituencies for further details.

Former name
1. Bexhill and Battle CC
2. Brighton, Kemptown BC
3. Brighton, Pavilion BC
4. Eastbourne BC
5. Hastings and Rye CC
6. Hove BC
7. Lewes CC
8. Wealden CC
Boundaries 2010–2024

Parliamentary constituencies in East Sussex

Current name
1. Bexhill and Battle CC
2. Brighton Kemptown and Peacehaven BC
3. Brighton Pavilion BC
4. East Grinstead and Uckfield CC
5. Eastbourne BC
6. Hastings and Rye CC
7. Hove and Portslade BC
8. Lewes CC
9. Sussex Weald CC
Boundaries 2024–present

For the 2023 periodic review of Westminster constituencies, which redrew the constituency map ahead of the 2024 United Kingdom general election, the Boundary Commission for England opted to combine East Sussex with West Sussex as a sub-region of the South East Region, resulting in the creation of a new cross-county boundary constituency named East Grinstead and Uckfield. The resultant changes to existing constituencies entailed the abolition of Wealden and the creation of the new constituency of Sussex Weald. Brighton Kemptown was renamed Brighton Kemptown and Peacehaven, and, although its boundaries were unchanged, it was proposed that Hove be renamed Hove and Portslade.

The following constituencies were proposed:

Containing electoral wards from Brighton and Hove

- Brighton Kemptown (part)
- Brighton Pavilion
- Hove and Portslade

Containing electoral wards from Eastbourne

- Eastbourne

Containing electoral wards from Hastings

- Hastings and Rye (part)

Containing electoral wards from Lewes

- Brighton Kemptown (part)
- East Grinstead and Uckfield (part)^{1}
- Lewes (part)

Containing electoral wards from Rother

- Bexhill and Battle (part)
- Hastings and Rye (part)

Containing electoral wards from Wealden

- Bexhill and Battle (part)
- East Grinstead and Uckfield (part)^{1}
- Lewes (part)
- Sussex Weald

^{1} Also contains part of Mid Sussex District in West Sussex

== Results history ==
Primary data source: House of Commons research briefing - General election results from 1918 to 2019

=== 2024 ===
The number of votes cast for each political party who fielded candidates in constituencies comprising East Sussex in the 2019 general election were as follows: (Note: Vote shares exclude the cross-county constituency of Mid Sussex, which has a predominantly West Sussex electorate)

| Party | Votes | % | Change from 2019 | Seats | Change from 2019 |
|---|---|---|---|---|---|
| Labour | 106,732 | 27.6% | ▲0.3% | 3 | ▲1 |
| Conservative | 88,069 | 22.8% | ▼21.4% | 2 | ▼3 |
| Liberal Democrats | 75,211 | 19.5% | ▲2.6% | 2 | ▲2 |
| Greens | 60,012 | 15.5% | ▲5.4% | 1 | 0 |
| Reform | 44,040 | 11.4% | ▲10.3 | 0 | 0 |
| Others | 12,536 | 3.2% | ▲2.8% | 0 | 0 |
| Total | 386,600 | 100.0 | | 8 | |

=== Percentage votes ===
| Election year | 1983 | 1987 | 1992 | 1997 | 2001 | 2005 | 2010 | 2015 | 2017 | 2019 | 2024 |
|---|---|---|---|---|---|---|---|---|---|---|---|
| Labour | 13.6 | 15.2 | 17.5 | 29.2 | 30.2 | 25.4 | 20.1 | 22.9 | 32.2 | 27.3 | 27.6 |
| Conservative | 58.4 | 57.8 | 52.8 | 39.4 | 39.6 | 39.8 | 40.9 | 42.3 | 44.3 | 44.2 | 22.8 |
| Liberal Democrat^{1} | 27.2 | 26.3 | 27.5 | 24.0 | 24.0 | 26.3 | 28.0 | 12.9 | 14.1 | 16.9 | 19.5 |
| Green Party | - | * | * | * | * | * | 5.7 | 10.1 | 7.8 | 10.1 | 15.5 |
| Reform | - | - | - | - | - | - | - | - | - | 1.1 | 11.4 |
| UKIP | - | - | - | * | * | * | 2.8 | 11.6 | 1.3 | * | * |
| Other | 0.9 | 0.7 | 2.1 | 7.4 | 6.2 | 8.6 | 2.4 | 0.3 | 0.3 | 0.4 | 3.2 |

^{1}1983 & 1987 - SDP–Liberal Alliance

* Included in Other

=== Seats ===
| Election year | 1983 | 1987 | 1992 | 1997 | 2001 | 2005 | 2010 | 2015 | 2017 | 2019 | 2024 |
|---|---|---|---|---|---|---|---|---|---|---|---|
| Conservative | 8 | 8 | 8 | 3 | 3 | 3 | 5 | 6 | 4 | 5 | 3 |
| Labour | 0 | 0 | 0 | 4 | 4 | 4 | 0 | 1 | 2 | 2 | 3 |
| Liberal Democrat^{1} | 0 | 0 | 0 | 1 | 1 | 1 | 2 | 0 | 1 | 0 | 2 |
| Greens | 0 | 0 | 0 | 0 | 0 | 0 | 1 | 1 | 1 | 1 | 1 |
| Total | 8 | 8 | 8 | 8 | 8 | 8 | 8 | 8 | 8 | 8 | 9 |

^{1}1983 & 1987 - SDP–Liberal Alliance

=== Maps ===
==== 1885-1910 ====
1885

1886

1892

1895

1900

1906

Jan 1910

Dec 1910

==== 1918-1945 ====
1918

1922

1923

1924

1929

1931

1935

1945

==== 1950-1979 ====
1950

1951

1955

1959

1964

1966

1970

Feb 1974

Oct 1974

1979

==== 1983-present ====
1983

1987

1992

1997

2001

2005

2010

2015

2017

2019

2024

== Historic representation by party ==
A cell marked → (with a different colour background to the preceding cell) indicates that the previous MP continued to sit under a new party name.

The Local Government Act 1972 moved the District of Mid Sussex into West Sussex from East Sussex. This change was put into effect in the Parliamentary constituency boundaries for the 1983 boundary changes.

=== 1885 to 1918 ===
Conservative Liberal

| Constituency | 1885 | 1886 | 86 | 89 | 1892 | 93 | 1895 | 1900 | 03 | 05 | 1906 | 08 | Jan 1910 | 10 | Dec 1910 | 11 | 14 |
|---|---|---|---|---|---|---|---|---|---|---|---|---|---|---|---|---|---|
| Brighton (Two members) | Smith | | Robertson | Loder | | | | | | Villiers | | | Tryon | | | | |
| Brighton (Two members) | Marriott | | | | | Vernon-Wentworth | | | | | Ridsdale | | Rice | | | Gordon | Thomas-Stanford |
| East Grinstead | Gregory | Gathorne-Hardy | | | | | Goschen | | | | Corbett | | Cautley | | | | |
| Eastbourne | Field | | | | | | | Hogg | | | Beaumont | | Gwynne | | | | |
| Hastings | Brassey | Noble | | | | | Lucas-Shadwell | Freeman-Thomas | | | H. du Cros | A. du Cros | | | | | |
| Lewes | Aubrey-Fletcher | | | | | | | | | | | | | Campion | | | |
| Rye | Brookfield | | | | | | | | Hutchinson | | Courthope | | | | | | |

=== 1918 to 1950 ===
Conservative

| Constituency | 1918 | 21 | 1922 | 1923 | 24 | 1924 | 25 | 1929 | 1931 | 32 | 35 | 1935 | 36 | 37 | 40 | 41 | 44 | 1945 |
|---|---|---|---|---|---|---|---|---|---|---|---|---|---|---|---|---|---|---|
| Brighton (Two members) | Tryon | | | | | | | | | | | | | | Erskine | Marlowe | | |
| Brighton (Two members) | Thomas-Stanford | | Rawson | | | | | | | | | | | | | | Teeling | |
| East Grinstead | Cautley | | | | | | | | | | | | Clarke | | | | | |
| Eastbourne | Gwynne | | | | | Lloyd | Hall | Marjoribanks | | Slater | Taylor | | | | | | | |
| Hastings | Lyon | Percy | | | | | | | | | | | | Hely-Hutchinson | | | | Cooper-Key |
| Lewes | Campion | | | | T. P. Beamish | | | | Loder | | | | T. P. Beamish | | | | | T. V. Beamish |
| Rye | Courthope | | | | | | | | | | | | | | | | | Cuthbert |

=== 1950 to 1983 ===
Conservative Labour

| Constituency | 1950 | 1951 | 1955 | 1959 | 1964 | 65 | 1966 | 69 | 1970 | 73 | Feb 1974 | Oct 1974 | 1979 |
|---|---|---|---|---|---|---|---|---|---|---|---|---|---|
| Brighton Kemptown | Johnson | | | James | Hobden | | | | Bowden | | | | |
| Brighton Pavilion | Teeling | | | | | | | Amery | | | | | |
| East Grinstead | Clarke | | Emmet | | | Johnson Smith | | | | | | | |
| Eastbourne | Taylor | | | | | | | | | | Gow | | |
| Hastings | Cooper-Key | | | | | | | | Warren | | | | |
| Hove | Marlowe | | | | | Maddan | | | | Sainsbury | | | |
| Lewes | Beamish | | | | | | | | | | Rathbone | | |
| Rye | | | Irvine | | | | | | | | | | |
| Sussex Mid | | | | | | | | | | | Renton | | |

=== 1983 to present ===
Conservative Green Independent Labour Liberal Democrats

| Constituency | 1983 | 1987 | 90 | 1992 | 1997 | 01 | 2001 | 2005 | 2010 | 2015 | 2017 | 18 | 19 | 2019 | 24 | 2024 |
|---|---|---|---|---|---|---|---|---|---|---|---|---|---|---|---|---|
| Bexhill and Battle | Wardle | | | | | → | Barker | | | Merriman | | | | | | Mullan |
| Brighton Kemptown / BK & Peacehaven ('24) | Bowden | | | | Turner | | | | Kirby | | Russell-Moyle | | | | → | Ward |
| Brighton Pavilion | Amery | | | Spencer | Lepper | | | | Lucas | | | | | | | Berry |
| Eastbourne | Gow | | Bellotti | Waterson | | | | | Lloyd | Ansell | Lloyd | → | | Ansell | | Babarinde |
| Hastings and Rye | Warren | | | Lait | Foster | | | | Rudd | | | | → | Hart | | Dollimore |
| Hove / Hove and Portslade ('24) | Sainsbury | | | | Caplin | | | Barlow | Weatherley | Kyle | | | | | | |
| Lewes | Rathbone | | | | Baker | | | | | Caulfield | | | | | | MacCleary |
| Wealden / Sussex Weald ('24) | Johnson Smith | | | | | | Hendry | | | Ghani | | | | | | |
| East Grinstead and Uckfield^{1} | | | | | | | | | | | | | | | | Davies |

^{1}partly in West Sussex

== See also ==
- List of parliamentary constituencies in the South East (region)
