= Brighton by-election =

Brighton by-election may refer to several by-elections in Brighton, England:

1st–16th Parliaments of the UK (1801–1857)

- 1842 Brighton by-election, won by Lord Alfred Hervey, standing as a Conservative
- 1853 Brighton by-election, won by Lord Alfred Hervey, standing as a Peelite

17th–26th Parliaments (1857–1900)

- 1860 Brighton by-election, won by James White, Liberal
- 1864 Brighton by-election, won by Henry Moor, Conservative
- 1884 Brighton by-election, won by William Thackeray Marriott, standing as a Conservative
- 1885 Brighton by-election, won by William Thackeray Marriott
- August 1886 Brighton by-election, won by William Thackeray Marriott
- November 1886 Brighton by-election, won by William Tindal Robertson, Conservative
- 1889 Brighton by-election, won by Gerald Walter Erskine Loder, Conservative
- 1893 Brighton by-election, won by Bruce Canning Vernon-Wentworth, Conservative

27th–35th Parliaments (1900–1931)

- 1905 Brighton by-election, won by Ernest Villiers, Liberal
- 1911 Brighton by-election, won by John Gordon, Conservative
- 1914 Brighton by-election, won by Charles Thomas-Stanford, Conservative

36th–38th Parliaments (1931–1950)

- 1940 Brighton by-election, won by Lord Erskine, Conservative
- 1941 Brighton by-election, won by Anthony Marlowe, Conservative
- 1944 Brighton by-election, won by William Teeling, Conservative

39th–47th Parliaments (1950–1979)

- 1969 Brighton Pavilion by-election, won by Julian Amery, Conservative
