= 1905 Brighton by-election =

UK parliamentary by-election

← 1900	5 April 1905	1906 →

Candidate	Villiers	Loder
Party	Liberal	Conservative
Popular vote	8,209	7,392
Percentage	52.6%	47.4%
MP before election
Loder
Conservative
Subsequent MP
Villiers
Liberal

The 1905 Brighton by-election was a Parliamentary by-election held on 5 April 1905. The constituency returned one Member of Parliament (MP) to the House of Commons of the United Kingdom, elected by the first past the post voting system.

It was one of only eight ministerial by-elections in the UK not to be retained by the incumbent.

== Vacancy ==
Gerald Loder had been Conservative MP for the seat of Brighton since the 1889 Brighton by-election. He vacated his seat upon appointment as Lord Commissioner of the Treasury so as to seek re-election.

== Electoral history ==
Brighton returned two Members of Parliament to the House of Commons of the United Kingdom, elected by the first past the post voting system. The seat had been Conservative since they gained it in 1885. They easily held both seats at the last election:

General election January 1900
Party	Candidate	Votes	%	±%
Conservative	Gerald Loder	7,858	40.9	+20.4
Conservative	Bruce Vernon-Wentworth	6,626	34.6	−2.0
Ind. Conservative	J. Kensit	4,693	24.5	New
Majority		1,933	10.1	−1.6
Conservative hold		Swing		
Majority		1,232	6.2	
Conservative hold		Swing		
Turnout		19,177	62.2	−12.2

== Candidates ==
The Conservatives re-selected 44-year-old Gerald Loder to defend the seat. He was private secretary to the President of the Local Government Board (Charles Ritchie) from 1888 to 1892 and to Lord George Hamilton (the Secretary of State for India) from 1896 to 1901.

The local Liberal Association selected 42-year-old Ernest Villiers as their candidate. He was ordained as an Anglican priest. After three years as a curate in Halifax, he became rector of Haveringland, Norfolk. He resigned from holy orders to pursue a political career.

== Campaign ==
Polling Day was fixed for 5 April 1905.

== Result ==
The Liberals gained the seat from the Conservatives:

Brighton by-election, 1905
Party	Candidate	Votes	%	±%
Liberal	Ernest Villiers	8,209	52.6	New
Conservative	Gerald Loder	7,392	47.4	−28.1
Majority		817	5.2	N/A
Turnout		15,601	76.3	+14.1
Liberal gain from Conservative		Swing		

== Aftermath ==
At the following General Election, the Liberals gained the other seat from the Conservatives, the result was:

General election January 1906
Party	Candidate	Votes	%	±%
Liberal	Ernest Villiers	9,062	26.4	N/A
Liberal	Aurelian Ridsdale	8,919	26.0	N/A
Conservative	George Tryon	8,188	23.8	−17.1
Conservative	John Gordon	8,176	23.8	−10.8
Majority		731	2.2	N/A
Liberal hold		Swing		
Majority		886	2.6	N/A
Liberal gain from Conservative		Swing		
Turnout		34,345	82.5	+20.3
