= Henry Moor =

Australian politician

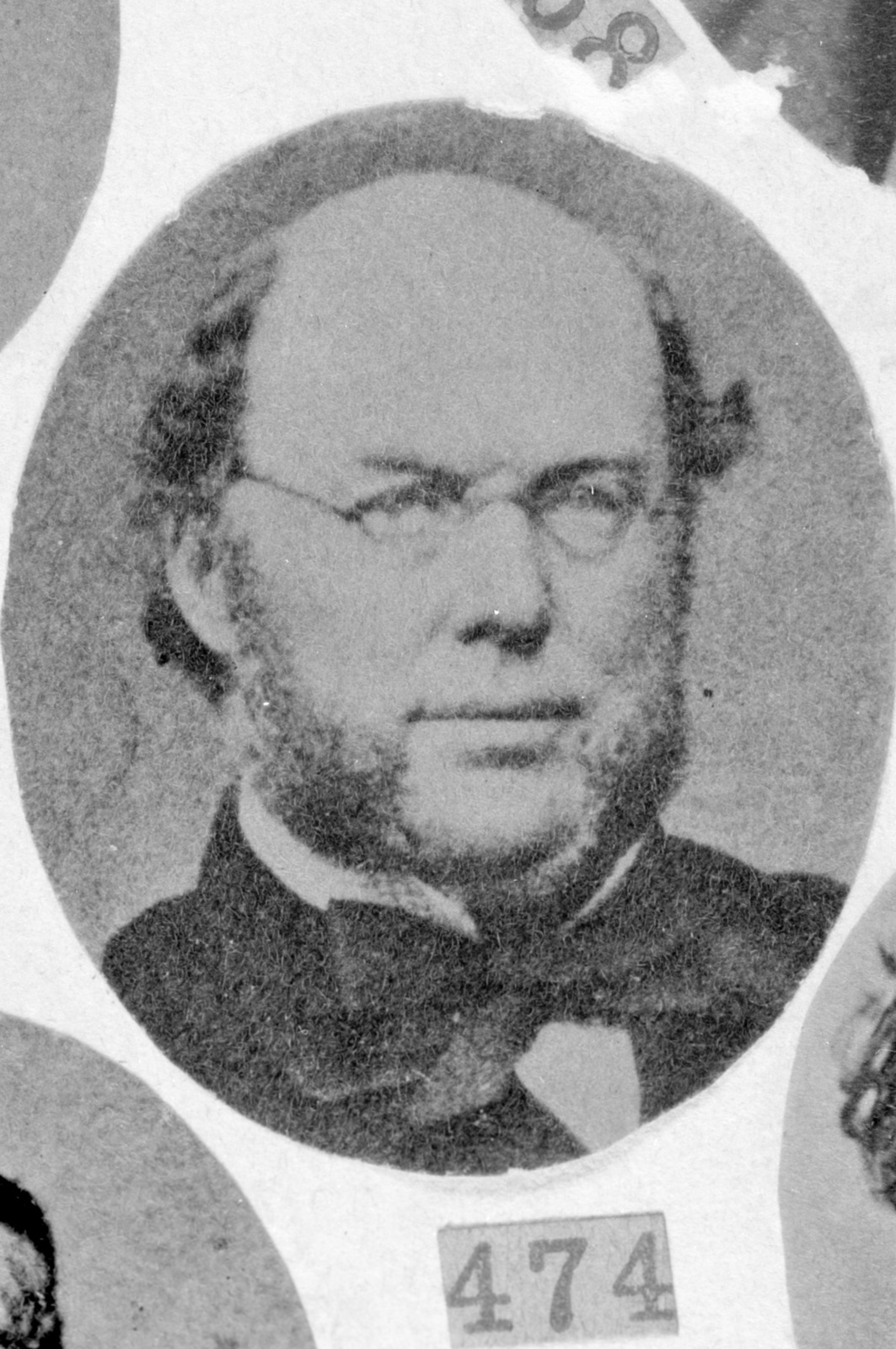
Henry Moor, State Library Victoria pictures collection

Henry Moor (1809 – 12 May 1877) was a British lawyer and politician who served as the second Mayor of Melbourne, Australia and as Member of Parliament for Brighton in England.

== Early life ==
Moor was born in Greenwich, Kent, England. He was Educated at Rev. Charles Parr Burney's school in the town. He was called to the bar at Lincoln's Inn on 12 November 1831, and from 1832 until 1841 he had a legal partnership with John Simpson at Furnival's Inn, London.

== Melbourne 1842–1854 ==
In 1842 Moor emigrated to Australia, arriving in Melbourne in February. He continued his legal work, initially as a conveyancer, before being admitted as attorney, solicitor and proctor in the Supreme Court of New South Wales in April 1843. He established a successful legal practice and rose to become chief magistrate of New South Wales.

Moor was elected to Melbourne Town Council to represent Bourke Ward, and served as the town's second mayor from 1844 to 1845. His second mayoral term followed from 1846 to 1847, with Melbourne achieving city status in the latter year. A new Anglican Diocese of Melbourne was created, and Moor was appointed first lay registrar of the diocese, a post he held until 1854.

In July 1849 Moor was elected to the New South Wales Legislative Council for the Electoral district of Port Phillip. In 1851 the Port Phillip District, including Melbourne, was removed from New South Wales to become the new Colony of Victoria.

From January 1852 to December 1853 Moor was in England, and he finally returned permanently in March 1854, settling in the resort town of Brighton on the south coast.

== Brighton 1854–1877 ==
Moor became a well-known figure in Brighton. When one of the town's sitting members of parliament, Admiral Sir George Brooke-Pechell, died in 1860 the local Conservative organisation nominated him as candidate in the ensuing by-election. Moor was defeated in a straight fight with the Radical candidate James White, securing 1,229 votes against White's 1,565.

Four years later a further by-election was held when Brighton's other MP, William Coningham, resigned. Moor was again a candidate, and although supported by the Conservative Party declared himself to be going forward on "independent principles" and claimed to be "bound by no party and no political club". Moor described himself as a "Liberal Conservative" and found himself facing no fewer than three Liberal candidates and one independent. Benefitting from this split vote, Moor was duly elected with a majority of 181 votes over his nearest rival, Henry Fawcett.

His time in the House of Commons was to be brief. A general election was held in 1865, and Moor was one of three candidates seeking the two Brighton seats. The two other candidates were the sitting MP James White and his opponent of the previous year, Henry Fawcett. Moor was defeated, winning 2,134 votes with White securing 3,065 and Fawcett 2,665. He made an attempt to regain the seat at the 1868 general election, but failed to be elected, coming last of six candidates.

Moor retired from politics and continued to reside in Brighton. He died in May 1877 while visiting Teddington, Middlesex, aged 68.

Preceded by Henry Condell	Mayor of Melbourne; 1844–1845	Succeeded by James Frederick Palmer
Preceded by James Frederick Palmer	Mayor of Melbourne; 1846–1847	Succeeded by Andrew Russell
New South Wales Legislative Council
Preceded by Edward Curr; James Frederick Palmer	Member for Port Phillip; 1849–1851; Served alongside: William Macarthur; John Dickson; Lauchlan Mackinnon / Charles Ebden; John Foster / William Mercer	Colony of Victoria established
Parliament of the United Kingdom
Preceded by William Coningham; James White	Member of Parliament for Brighton; 1864–1865; With: James White	Succeeded by Henry Fawcett; James White
