= James White (English politician) =

English politician

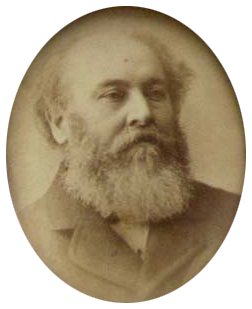
- Born: 10 April 1809
- Occupation: Politician
- Spouse: Mary Lind
- Children: Linda White Mazini Villari

James White (10 April 1809 – 9 January 1883) was a British Liberal Party politician who sat in the House of Commons between 1857 and 1874.

White was the second son of William White of Tulse Hill, Surrey and his wife Susannah née Weeks. He was educated privately. He was merchant in the City of London, principally engaged in trade with China. From 1835 to 1851, he was an alderman of the City.

At the 1857 general election White was elected as one of the two Members of Parliament (MPs) for Plymouth, but he lost the seat two years later at the 1859 general election. In July 1860 he was elected at a by-election as an MP for Brighton. He held the seat until his defeat at the 1874 general election.

== Family ==
In 1833 he married Mary Lind (1815 or 1816–1883), a botanical artist. Their daughter was Linda White Mazini Villari, whose daughter Costanza married artist William Stokes Hulton; their daughter in turn was Edith Teresa Hulton, Lady Berwick (1890-1972).

== Death ==
White died at his residence in South Kensington, London, in 1883 at the age of 73.

Parliament of the United Kingdom
Preceded by Roundell Palmer; Robert Collier	Member of Parliament for Plymouth; 1857–1859; With: Robert Collier	Succeeded by Viscount Valletort; Robert Collier
Preceded by William Coningham; Sir George Brooke-Pechell, Bt	Member of Parliament for Brighton; 1860–1874; With: William Coningham to 1864; Henry Moor 1864–1865; Henry Fawcett from 1865	Succeeded by James Lloyd Ashbury; Charles Cameron Shute
