= Adolphus Dalrymple =

British Army officer and politician

General Sir Adolphus Dalrymple Bt
- Born: 3 February 1784; Marylebone, London
- Died: 3 March 1866 (aged 82); Aldenham, Hertfordshire
- Burial place: St John the Baptist, Aldenham
- Education: Harrow School
- Spouse: Anne Graham (m. 1812–1858)
- Relatives: Sir Hew Damrymple (father)
- Military career
- Allegiance: United Kingdom
- Branch: British Army
- Service years: 1799–1866
- Rank: General
- Conflicts: French Revolutionary Wars; Napoleonic Wars

Member of Parliament for Weymouth and Melcombe Regis
- In office 1817–1818

Member of Parliament for Appleby
- In office 1819–1826

Member of Parliament for Haddington Burghs
- In office 1826–1831

Member of Parliament for Brighton
- In office 1837–1841

General Sir Adolphus John Dalrymple, 2nd Baronet (3 February 1784 – 3 March 1866) was a British Army officer and politician.

== Early life ==
Aldolphus Dalrymple was the eldest son of Sir Hew Whiteford Dalrymple and his wife Frances nee Leighton, and was born in St Marylebone. At the time of his birth his father was an officer in the 1st Foot Guards. Adolphus attended Harrow School from 1796 to 1799.

== Military career ==
Dalrymple's father was able to use his social and military connections to advance his son's career in the army. In 1799 Sir Hew was Lieutenant Governor of Guernsey and he obtained a commission for Adolphus, than aged 15, in the 55th (Westmorland) Regiment of Foot that was stationed on the island. In the following year he was promoted to full lieutenant in the 37th (North Hampshire) Regiment of Foot of which his father was colonel, and was appointed his aide de camp.

In February 1801 he exchanged to the 1st King's Dragoon Guards, then stationed in England. He quickly obtained another staff appointment as aide de camp to Lieutenant-General Sir James Craig, commanding the Eastern District of England. He was promoted to captain in the 18th Light Dragoons at the beginning of 1803, but had returned to Craig's staff within six months. He remained as the general's aide de camp until May 1806, serving in Malta, Sicily, and Naples.

In June 1806 he was appointed military secretary to his father, by then Lieutenant-Governor of Gibraltar. Sir Hew was subsequently appointed to command British forces in Portugal fighting the French, but signed the Convention of Cintra in August 1808 that allowed the defeated French safe passage out of the country. The signing of the convention by his father was seen as a major humiliation by the British public, and Adolphus's military career suffered. Although he was able to purchase promotions as a major in the 3rd (East Kent) Regiment of Foot and the 19th Light Dragoons and as a lieutenant colonel in the 60th (Royal American) Regiment of Foot, he never saw active service again and transferred to the half pay list in 1814.

== Parliamentary career ==
In 1812 Dalrymple married Anne, daughter of Sir James Graham, 1st Baronet, of Kirkstall, member of parliament for Carlisle. His father-in-law was able to assist him in obtaining a seat in the Commons in 1817 when a vacancy arose at Weymouth and Melcombe Regis. He lost the seat, however, at the 1818 general election. A year later he obtained another seat at Appleby, where his father-in-law was recorder of the borough. In 1826 he changed constituencies to become MP for Haddington Burghs, succeeding a relative, Sir Hew Dalrymple-Hamilton, 4th Baronet. In 1830 his father, who had been created a baronet in 1815, died. Adolphus accordingly inherited the title to become the 2nd Baronet. In the same year he was promoted to colonel and appointed aide de camp to William IV. He lost his Commons seat at the 1832 general election.

In 1837 he returned to parliament as one of Brighton's two MPs. In the same year he became aide de camp to the new monarch, Queen Victoria. He held the post until 1841, in which year he also lost his Commons seat.

== Later life ==
Although no longer active in the army, Dalrymple continued to receive promotions: to major general in 1841, lieutenant general in 1851 and general in 1860. He had a number of homes: High Mark in Wigtownshire, which he had inherited from his father, a house in Grosvenor Square, London, another in Brunswick Terrace, Brighton and Delrow House, Aldenham, Hertfordshire. He died at his Hertfordshire home in 1866 aged 82. As he had no children, the baronetcy expired on his death. He was buried in the family vault at St John's Church, Aldenham.

Parliament of the United Kingdom
| Preceded by Sir John Murray; Christopher Idle; Viscount Cranborne; Masterton Ure | Member of Parliament for Weymouth and Melcombe Regis; 1817–1818; With: Sir John Murray; Christopher Idle; Masterton Ure | Succeeded by Masterton Ure; Thomas Wallace; Fowell Buxton; John Gordon |
| Preceded by George Fludyer; Lucius Concannon | Member of Parliament for Appleby; 1819–1826; With: Lucius Concannon to 1820; George Tierney 1820; Thomas Creevey from 1820 | Succeeded by Henry Tufton; Viscount Maitland |
| Preceded by Sir Hew Dalrymple-Hamilton Bt | Member of Parliament for Haddington Burghs; 1826–1831 | Succeeded by Robert Steuart |
| Preceded by Isaac Wigney; Sir George Brooke-Pechell Bt | Member of Parliament for Brighton; 1837–1841; With: Sir George Brooke-Pechell Bt | Succeeded by Isaac Wigney; Sir George Brooke-Pechell Bt |
Baronetage of Nova Scotia
| Preceded by Hew Dalrymple | Baronet (of High Mark); 1830–1866 | Extinct |
