= William Coningham =

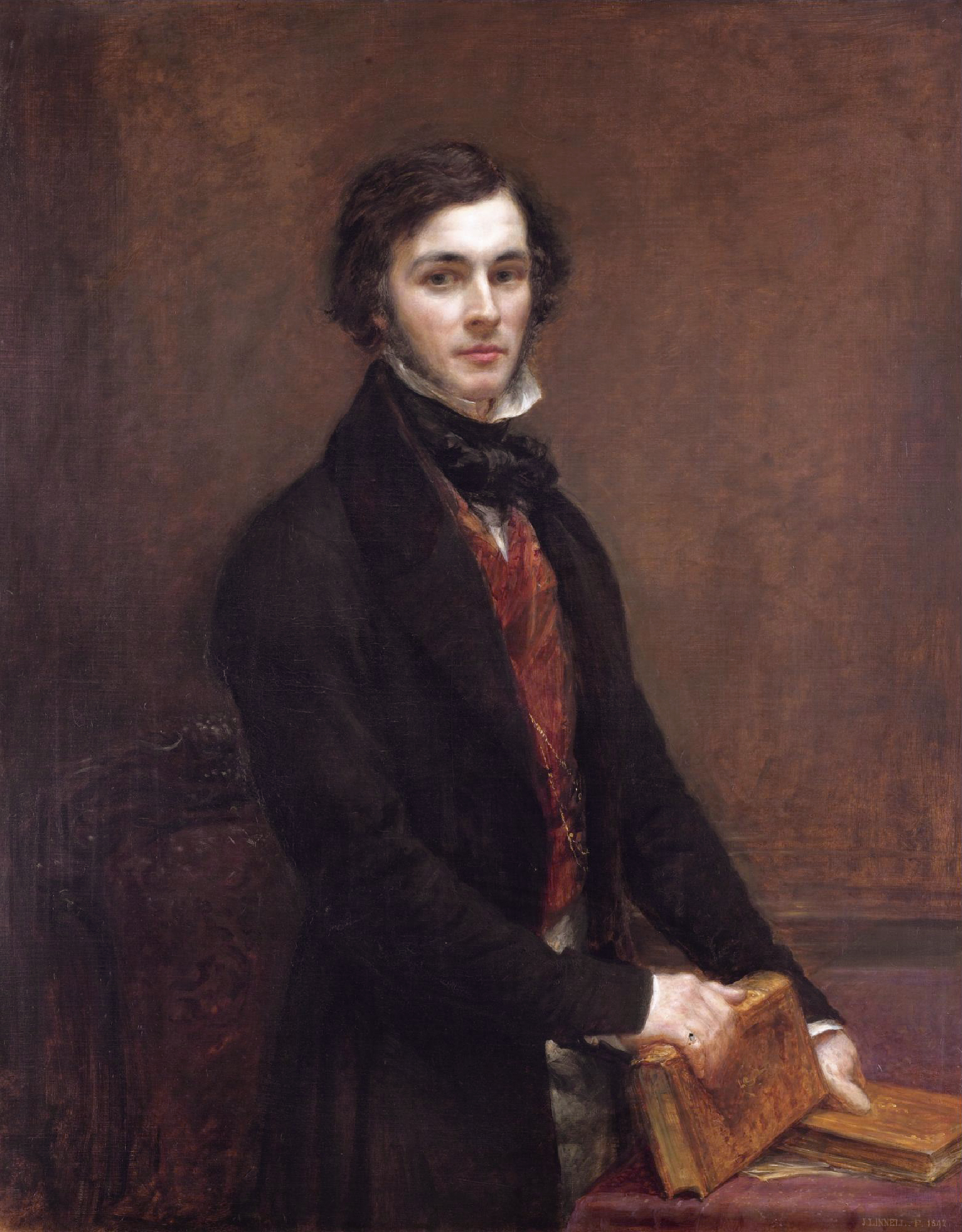
William Coningham (John Linnel, 1842)

William Coningham (26 June 1815 – 20 December 1884) was a British Liberal politician and art collector.

== Early life and family ==
Born in Penzance, he was the son of the Rev. Robert Coningham, a clergyman from County Londonderry, and his wife Louisa née Capper. Louisa was the daughter of Colonel James Capper, an officer in the East India Company Army, and the author of philosophical and poetical works.

William was the Coninghams' only child to survive infancy. His foster-brother was James Fitzjames, one of the leaders of the doomed Franklin Expedition; the parents treated James Fitzjames as if he was their own son and William regarded him as a brother.

Following education at Eton College and Trinity College, Cambridge, Coningham obtained a commission in the 1st (Royal) Regiment of Dragoons in 1834, but bought himself out in 1836. He married Elizabeth Meyrick in Bath, Somerset, on 12 November 1840.

== Friendships and correspondence ==
A keen correspondent, he exchanged a number of letters on spiritual matters with his cousin John Sterling. He was subsequently to edit and publish these as Twelve Letters in 1851. He was also a friend of Thomas Carlyle, and a number of letters between the two survive.

== Art collecting ==
Coningham built up a large art collection, principally the work of Italian Old Masters. These included two panels of the Adoring Saints by Lorenzo Monaco, presented to the National Gallery, London in 1848. Other works included Portrait of a Woman by Francesco Montemezzano (now in the Metropolitan Museum of Art, New York), and Tarquin and Lucretia by Titian (now in the Fitzwilliam Museum, Cambridge). His collection of drawings is now widely scattered with examples in Princeton University Art Museum and elsewhere, but a group are in the British Museum.

The art historian Francis Haskell judged him "an exceptionally cultivated man" and "one of the most successful and discriminating... collectors of Old Masters in the nineteenth century".

== Politics ==
A Liberal in politics, he was a supporter of Lord Palmerston and in favour of the extension of suffrage and the secret ballot. By 1847 he was living in Kemptown, Brighton and was chosen to contest the local parliamentary constituency at the general election of that year. He failed to be elected and at the next election in 1852 he stood at Westminster, again without success. He won a seat on his third attempt at the 1857 general election becoming one of two members of parliament for Brighton. He held the seat at the 1859 general election.

By late 1863 it became apparent that Coningham's health was deteriorating. In January of the next year he announced his immediate retirement from the Commons. By 1868 his health had recovered and he attempted to regain his parliamentary seat at Brighton, standing as one of three Liberal candidates for the two seats in the constituency, but without success.

== Death ==
He died at his Brighton residence in 1884, aged 69.

Parliament of the United Kingdom
Preceded by Sir George Brooke-Pechell; Lord Alfred Hervey	Member of Parliament for Brighton; 1857–1864; With: Sir George Brooke-Pechell 1857–1860; James White 1860–1864	Succeeded by James White; Henry Moor
