= Alban Gordon =

British political activist

Alban Godwin Gordon (1890 – 4 April 1947) was a British political activist.

Born in Aberdeen, Scotland, Gordon was educated at King Edward's School, Birmingham and the University of Birmingham. While there he founded the university Fabian Society. He also joined the Independent Labour Party and, through it, became active in the Labour Party; in 1909 and 1910 he worked full-time as a speaker for the party.

Gordon founded the Wolverhampton Trades Council and served as its first secretary. During the 1910s he worked several jobs, including secretarial work for Joseph Fels, as a lecturer for the National Committee for the Prevention of Destitution, a lecturer at the Working Men's College and the Fabian Society, and also for the National Health Insurance Commission. From 1912, he worked as a clerk for the Coventry Insurance Committee, and he became the secretary of the Domestic Servants' Insurance Society. This work led him to found the Association of Approved Societies. During World War I he served in the British Army, reaching the rank of captain.

Gordon served several stints on the executive of the Fabian Society, the first in 1911. Through the society he became active in the Labour Party, and was elected to Brighton Town Council. He stood unsuccessfully for the Labour Party in Brighton at the 1923 and 1924 United Kingdom general elections, then focused on qualifying as a barrister, becoming the Lee Prizeman at Gray's Inn. Gordon stood in Lewes at the 1929 United Kingdom general election, then in Brighton at the 1935 United Kingdom general election, and finally in the 1936 Lewes by-election, but was never elected to Parliament.
