= 1936 Lewes by-election =

UK Parliamentary by-election

The 1936 Lewes by-election was held on 18 June 1936. The by-election was held due to the elevation to the peerage of the incumbent Conservative MP, John Loder. It was won by the Conservative candidate Tufton Beamish.

Lewes by-election, 1936
Party	Candidate	Votes	%	±%
Conservative	Tufton Beamish	14,646	65.96	
Labour	Alban Gordon	7,557	34.04	
Majority		7,089	31.92	
Turnout		22,203		
Conservative hold		Swing		
