= Isaac Wigney =

English banker and Liberal Party politician

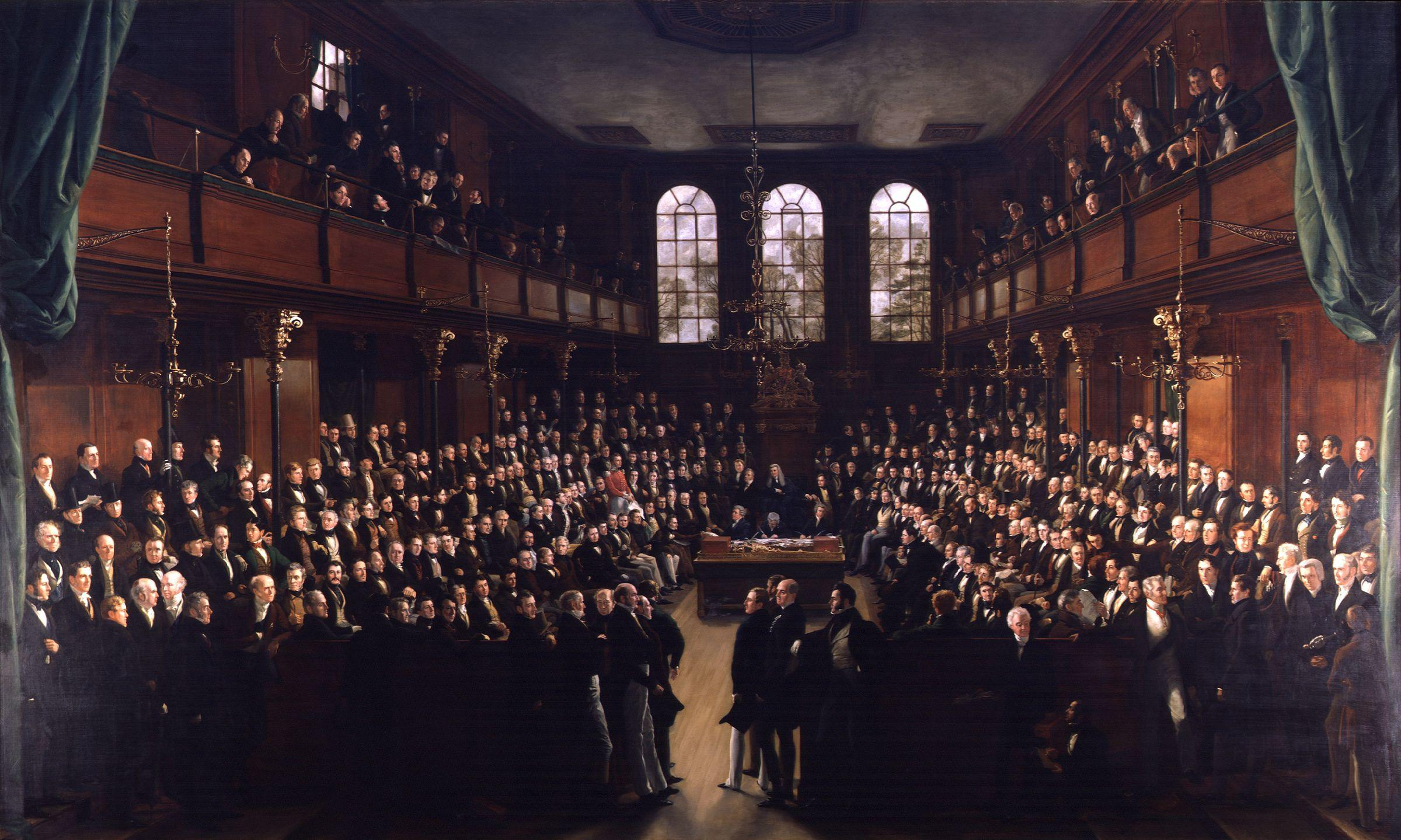

Isaac Newton Wigney (1795 – 8 February 1844) was an English banker and Liberal Party politician who sat in the House of Commons between 1832 and 1842.

Wigney was the son of William Wigney and his wife Ann Killick. His father was a successful banker in Brighton. In about 1821 Isaac Newton Wigney married Caroline Walter, daughter of William Walter, eldest son of John Walter, former editor of The Times and later MP for Berkshire.

At the 1832 general election Wigney was elected as a member of parliament (MP) for Brighton. He held the seat until his defeat in 1837, but was re elected at the 1841 general election.

In 1836 Wigney took over the bank on the death of his father. However, in 1842 the bank failed. Wigney was declared bankrupt, left Brighton and gave up his seat in the House of Commons. He died two years later at the age of 49.

Parliament of the United Kingdom
New constituency	Member of Parliament for Brighton; 1832–1837; With: George Faithfull to 1835; George Pechell from 1835	Succeeded by Sir Adolphus Dalrymple, Bt; George Pechell
Preceded by Sir Adolphus Dalrymple, Bt; George Pechell	Member of Parliament for Brighton; 1841–1842; With: George Pechell	Succeeded by Lord Alfred Hervey; Sir George Pechell, Bt
