= Spencer Edmund Hollond =

British Army staff officer

Major-General Spencer Edmund Hollond CB CMG DSO
- Born: 19 March 1874
- Died: 5 February 1950 (aged 75)

Major-General Spencer Edmund Hollond, CB, CMG, DSO (19 March 1874 – 5 February 1950) was a British Army staff officer during the First World War.

== Life ==
He was the second son of John Robert Hollond and attended Harrow School (there becoming friends with Winston Churchill) then Trinity College, Cambridge. He joined the Rifle Brigade as a second lieutenant in 1895, rising to lieutenant in 1897. He served in the Second Boer War, being mentioned in dispatches, receiving the Queen's South Africa Medal with 4 clasps and being promoted to captain in 1901. He then served as aide-de-camp to the Duke of Connaught from 1901 to 1904 before being appointed as an aide-de-camp on 7 May 1904 and promoted to major in 1913.

During the First World War he rose to brigadier general, was mentioned seven times in despatches, won the Distinguished Service Order in 1916 and was a GSO2 on Third Army's staff during the battle of the Somme and the battle of Gommecourt, criticising Thomas D'Oyly Snow's planning of the attack and asking Allenby for Snow's dismissal. He ended the war as BGGS inspector-general of training and with the nickname 'Tom' Hollond from his troops.

After the war he was made a colonel (1920), a knight of the Legion of Honour, a Companion of the Order of St Michael and St George in 1919 and a Companion of the Order of the Bath in 1920 and attended the opening of Plymouth's War Memorial in 1923 . He was colonel commandant of 8th Infantry Brigade (1921–1925), commandant of the Senior Officers School (1925–27). He rose to Major-General in 1927 and retired the following year.

== Marriage and issue ==
He first married on 5 October 1905 to Lulu Pfizer (granddaughter of the American pharmaceutical manufacturer Charles Pfizer) at St George's, Hanover Square. Three of the bridesmaids were English, and three American, and the couple received as wedding gifts a loving cup from the Duke and Duchess of Connaught and Swedish enamels from Princess Gustav of Sweden. They had one child, Charles Arthur Spencer Hollond (1906–1929). Lulu Pfizer Hollond had been painted in 1901 by the Swiss-born American artist Adolfo Müller-Ury and exhibited that year at Knoedler's in New York.

Lulu died in 1911 and then Spencer remarried on 16 September 1920 to Esther Eliza Sanderson, daughter of Llewellyn Traherne Bassett Sanderson and Lady Rachel Mary Scott. They had one child, Robert Gustof Percy Hollond, in 1921.
