= George Faithfull =

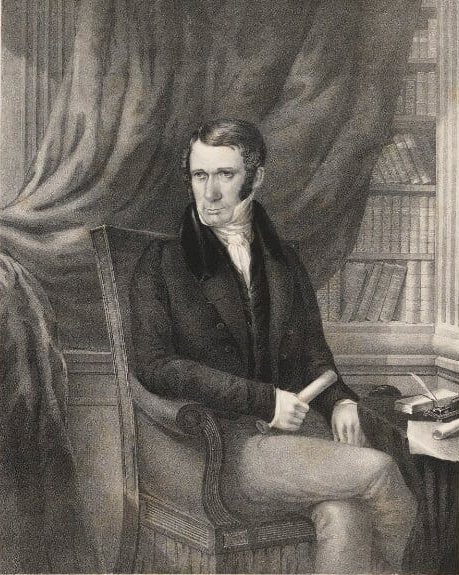
- George Faithfull, portrait c.1832

Member of Parliament for Brighton
- In office 1832–1835

Personal details
- Born: 1790 England
- Died: 11 March 1863 (aged 72–73) Brighton, England
- Party: Radical
- Occupation: Solicitor, politician, newspaper publisher, nonconformist minister

George Faithfull (1790 – 11 March 1863) was an English solicitor and Radical politician.

== Life ==
Faithfull was a solicitor and partner in G & H Faithfull & Co., one of the three largest law firms in Brighton. He became involved in the public life of the rapidly expanding town as solicitor to Thomas Read Kemp, developer of the Kemp Town Estate. He was subsequently a member of the Brighton Improvement Commissioners. Kemp had established his own non-conformist sect, and Faithfull was a regular preacher in the chapel in Ship Street, Brighton. When Kemp returned to the Church of England in 1823, Faithfull became minister of the Ship Street Chapel (later called Holy Trinity Church, in 1827 replacing it with a new building in Church Street.

Following the Reform Act 1832, Brighton was enfranchised as a parliamentary borough, returning two members of parliament to the House of Commons. At the 1832 general election Faithfull was elected as one of the town's first MPs alongside Isaac Wigney. His extreme Radical views were not popular with his constituents, however. The diarist Charles Greville, a resident of Brighton, described him as a "bad character". He was defeated at the next general election in 1835.

Faithfull put his defeat down to lack of support from the press, and accordingly began publication of the weekly Brighton Patriot and Lewes Free Press in February 1835 to propagate his views. He was once again defeated in an ill-tempered general election in 1837. The middle class readership abandoned Faithfull's newspaper and he found himself aligned with the local Chartists. When a series of Chartist riots and strikes took place in 1839, Faithfull closed the Patriot.

He continued his legal practice until his death, acting as solicitors to a number of railway companies. He died at his Brighton residence in March 1863.

Parliament of the United Kingdom
| New constituency | Member of Parliament for Brighton; 1832–1835; With: Isaac Wigney | Succeeded by George Pechell; Isaac Wigney |
