= Charles Thomas-Stanford =

British politician

Sir Charles Thomas-Stanford
- Born: 1858
- Died: 1932 (aged 73–74)
- Occupation: Politician
- Political party: Conservative
- Spouse: Ellen Stanford (m. 1897)

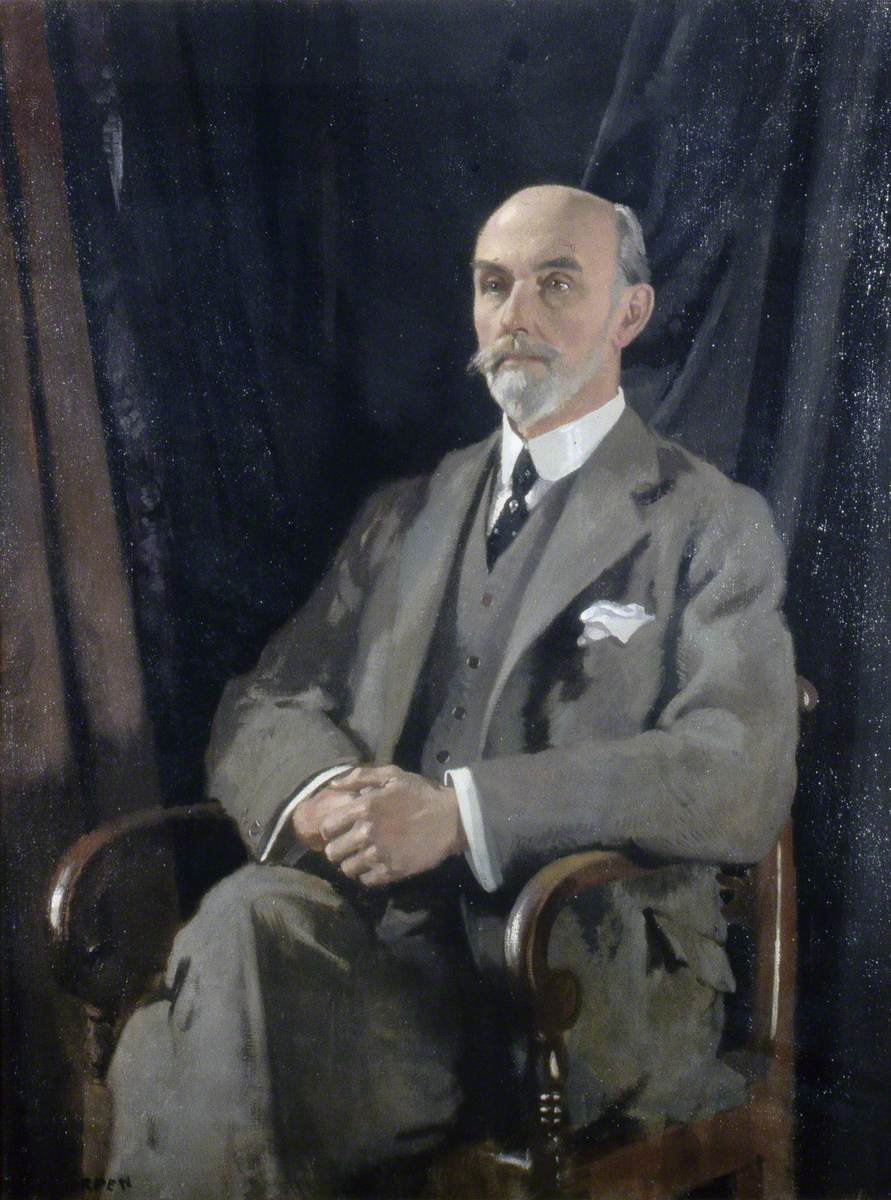
Image of Sir Charles Thomas-Stanford

Sir Charles Thomas-Stanford, 1st Baronet (3 April 1858 – 7 March 1932), born Charles Thomas, was a British Conservative Party politician from Brighton. He sat in the House of Commons from 1914 to 1922.

== Early life and family ==
The son of David Collet Thomas, from Hove, he was educated at the Highgate School and at Oriel College, Oxford, where he graduated with a BA degree in 1881. He was called to the bar at the Inner Temple in 1882, but did not practice.

In 1897 he married Ellen Stanford, the daughter and heiress of William Stanford of Preston Park, Sussex, and widow of Vere Benett-Stanford, the former MP for Shaftesbury. In the same year he changed his name by royal licence to Thomas-Stanford.

== Career ==
Thomas-Stanford became a Justice of the Peace (J.P.) for Brighton, and served as Mayor of Brighton in 1910–11 and 1912–14, becoming an alderman by 1914.

Thomas-Stanford was elected as a member of parliament (MP) for Brighton in June 1914 at an unopposed by-election following the resignation of the Conservative MP John Gordon. He was re-elected in 1918 as a Coalition Conservative (i.e. a supporter of the coalition government led by the Liberal David Lloyd George), and stood down from Parliament at the 1922 general election.

In 1922 he donated Lewes Castle to the Sussex Archaeological Society, of which he was a long-serving chairman.

Thomas-Stanford was made a baronet on the 1929 New Year Honours and the title was conferred on 8 May 1929.

He died aged 73 on 7 March 1932 at his home Preston Manor, Brighton, which was bequeathed to Brighton Corporation.

== Arms ==
Coat of arms of Thomas-Stanford of Brighton
Crest 1st, on a wreath of the colours, a buffalo's head caboshed Sable within a chain in arch Or, the head charged, for distinction, with a cross crosslet also Or (Stanford); 2nd, on a wreath of the colours, a demi-unicorn Gules, charged on the body with two chevronels, as in the arms, and supporting with the sinister forepaw a plate charged with a fleur-de-lys of the First. Escutcheon Quarterly, 1 and 4: per pale Or and Sable, on a chevron nebuly between three bugles stringed, as many martlets all counterchanged, and (for distinction) in the centre chief point a cross crosslet also counterchanged ( Stanford); 2 and 3: Gules, two chevronels Argent between in chief as many plates, each charged with a fleur-de-lys of the Field, and in base a wolf's head erased of the Second (Thomas). Motto Aequus in arduis

Parliament of the United Kingdom
Preceded by Sir Cooper Rawson; George Tryon	Member of Parliament for Brighton; 1914 – 1922; With: George Tryon	Succeeded by Sir Cooper Rawson; George Tryon
Baronetage of the United Kingdom
New creation	Baronet (of Brighton); 1929–1932	Extinct
