= Lord Alfred Hervey =

British politician

- Born: 25 June 1816
- Died: 15 April 1875 (aged 58)
- Education: Eton College
- Occupation: Politician
- Title: Lord
- Spouse: Sophia Elizabeth Cheste
- Children: Reverend Canon Frederick Alfred John Hervey
- Parent(s): Frederick Hervey, 1st Marquess of Bristol; Elizabeth Albana
- Relatives: Clotworthy Upton, 1st Baron Templetown (maternal grandfather)

Lord Alfred Hervey (25 June 1816 – 15 April 1875), known before 1826 as Alfred Hervey, was a British politician.

== Biography ==
=== Early life ===
Alfred Hervey was born on 25 June 1816. He was the youngest son of Frederick Hervey, 1st Marquess of Bristol and Elizabeth Albana (1775–1844). His maternal grandfather was Clotworthy Upton, 1st Baron Templetown. He received his education at Eton and Trinity College, Cambridge.

=== Career ===
He served as a Junior Lord of the Treasury in Lord Aberdeen's coalition government and Lord Palmerston's first government.

He was one of the two MPs for Brighton during the years 1842–1857. Active in the affairs of the town, he was a founder Vice President of Brighton College and served on its Council from 1845 to 1875. From 1859 to 1865, he was MP for Bury St Edmunds. He was a member of the Canterbury Association from 27 March 1848.

He was commissioned as a Lieutenant in the disembodied West Suffolk Militia (commanded by his elder brother the 2nd Marquess) on 4 July 1831, and was promoted to captain on 9 April 1852.

=== Personal life ===
On 5 August 1845 he married Sophia Elizabeth Chester. Their eldest son Reverend Canon Frederick Alfred John Hervey (1846–1910) was Chaplain-in-Ordinary to Queen Victoria from 1886 to 1901 and Domestic Chaplain to King Edward VII from 1878 to 1910.

=== Death ===
He died on 15 April 1875.

Political offices
Preceded by Marquess of Chandos; The Lord Henry Lennox; Thomas Bateson	Junior Lord of the Treasury; 1853–1855	Succeeded by The Viscount Monck and Viscount Duncan
Parliament of the United Kingdom
Preceded by Isaac Wigney and Sir George Brooke-Pechell, Bt.	Member of Parliament for Brighton; 1842–1857; With: Sir George Brooke-Pechell, Bt.	Succeeded by William Coningham and Sir George Brooke-Pechell, Bt.
Preceded by Earl Jermyn and Joseph Hardcastle	Member of Parliament for Bury St Edmunds; 1859–1865; With: Joseph Hardcastle	Succeeded by Edward Greene and Joseph Hardcastle
