= 1911 Brighton by-election =

UK Parliamentary by-election

The 1911 Brighton by-election was held on 26 June 1911. The by-election was conducted for the succession of the incumbent Conservative MP, Walter Rice as seventh Baron Dynevor. The Conservative candidate John Gordon won the election unopposed.
