= 1944 Brighton by-election =

UK Parliamentary by-election

The 1944 Brighton by-election was held on 3 February 1944. The by-election was held due to the resignation of the incumbent Conservative MP, Sir Cooper Rawson. It was won by the Conservative candidate William Teeling.

Bruce Dutton Briant stood as a National Independent. He claimed to be a supporter of the National Government but was repudiated by Winston Churchill.

Brighton by-election, 1944
| Party | Candidate | Votes | % | ±% |
|---|---|---|---|---|
| Conservative | William Teeling | 14,591 | 53.6 | −22.6 |
| National | Bruce Dutton Briant | 12,635 | 46.4 | New |
| Majority | | 1,956 | 7.2 | −18.7 |
| Turnout | | 27,226 | 22.1 | −39.6 |
| Conservative hold | | Swing | | |
