= 1914 Brighton by-election =

UK Parliamentary by-election

The 1914 Brighton by-election was held on 29 June 1914. The by-election was held due to the resignation of the incumbent Conservative MP, John Edward Gordon. It was won by the Conservative candidate Charles Thomas-Stanford, who was unopposed.
