= Cooper Rawson =

British businessman and Conservative Party politician

Sir Cooper Rawson
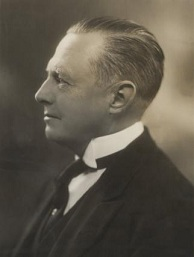

Member of Parliament for Brighton with George Tryon (1922-1940) Lord Erskine (1940-1941) Anthony Marlowe (1941-1944)
- In office 1922–1944
- Preceded by: Sir Charles Thomas-Stanford
- Succeeded by: Sir William Teeling

Personal details
- Born: 26 July 1876 Whetstone, Leicestershire, England
- Died: 11 January 1946 (aged 69) Hove, Sussex, England
- Party: Conservative
- Spouse: Elizabeth Rawson

Sir Alfred Cooper Rawson (26 July 1876 – 11 January 1946) was a British businessman and Conservative Party politician. After a decade in local government, he sat in the House of Commons from 1922 to 1944.

== Business career ==
Born in Leicester, Rawson established himself in the road stone industry, becoming chairman of several companies, including the Montsorrel Granite Company, the Endaby Stoney Stanton Granite Company, John Ellis and sons, and Durex Ltd. He was a delegate to the International Road Congress in 1923 and in 1926, and in 1930 he was president of the Granite Guild; the following year he was president of the Institute of Quarrying.

== Royal Naval Volunteer Reserve ==
During World War I, he joined the Royal Naval Division as a sub-lieutenant, transferring in 1916 to the Royal Naval Volunteer Reserve (RNVR). He served the rest of the war with the RNVR at The Crystal Palace, becoming a temporary lieutenant commander.

Rawson remained involved with the RNVR after the war, and in 1925 was made an honorary commander, attached to the RNVR's Sussex Division; in 1940 he was made an honorary Captain of the RNVR.

== Politics ==
Rawson political career began in 1911, when he was elected to Wandsworth Council. He was a Wandsworth councillor for 11 years, serving as mayor in 1918 to 1919, and was elected to the London County Council (LCC) in 1913.

He was elected Member of Parliament (MP) for Brighton at the 1922 general election, replacing the Conservative MP Charles Thomas-Stanford, who had retired. He stood down from local government on his election to Westminster and held his seat in the Commons at the next five general elections. Rawson holds the record for the largest number of votes ever polled by a candidate at a British general election, a record he achieved in the 1931 election by polling 75,205 votes. Such a feat also makes Rawson the record holder for the largest majority for an MP, at 62,253. This record was typical of a wider contest which saw an overwhelming Conservative victory.

Rawson told his local Conservative Association in October 1943 that he wanted to be relieved of his Parliamentary duties as soon as possible, and retired from Parliament on 17 January 1944, by resigning his seat through the procedural device of accepting appointment as Steward of the Manor of Northstead.

== Honours ==
Rawson was knighted in the 1926 New Year Honours List, and in 1927 he was awarded the Legion of Honour by the government of France, for his work with the British League of Help.

In July 1929, he was presented with a silver dinner bell by the National Federation of Granite and Roadstone Quarry Owners, in recognition of his services to the industry, and in particular of his efforts in blocking a Bill in Parliament which would have led to the expansion of council-owned quarries.

== Family ==
Rawson married Elizabeth Robson in 1902. He died on 11 January 1946 at Hove, Sussex, aged 69.

Parliament of the United Kingdom
Preceded by George Tryon; Charles Thomas-Stanford	Member of Parliament for Brighton; 1922 – 1944; With: George Tryon 1922–1940; Lord Erskine 1940–1941; Anthony Marlowe 1941–1944	Succeeded by Anthony Marlowe; William Teeling
