= George Tryon, 1st Baron Tryon =

British politician (1871–1940)

Major The Right Honourable The Lord Tryon PC
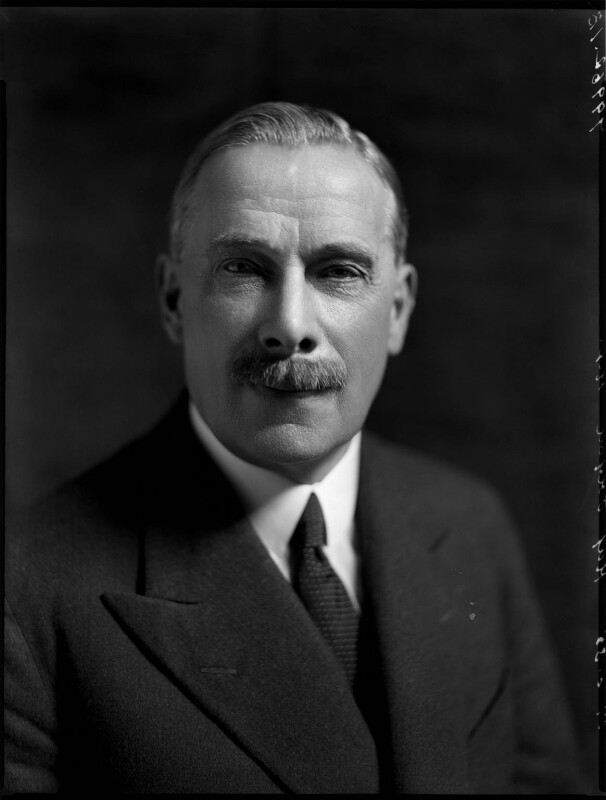

Chancellor of the Duchy of Lancaster
- In office 3 April 1940 – 14 May 1940
- Prime Minister: Neville Chamberlain
- Preceded by: William Morrison
- Succeeded by: The Lord Hankey

First Commissioner of Works
- In office 18 May 1940 – 3 October 1940
- Preceded by: The Earl De La Warr
- Succeeded by: Sir John Reith

Personal details
- Born: 15 May 1871
- Died: 24 November 1940 (aged 69) Little Court, Sunningdale
- Spouse: Averil Vivian
- Children: 2, including Charles, 2nd Baron Tryon

Military service
- Allegiance: United Kingdom
- Branch/service: British Army
- Years of service: 1890-1906, 1914-
- Rank: Major (United Kingdom)
- Unit: Grenadier Guards
- Battles/wars: Second Boer War

George Clement Tryon, 1st Baron Tryon, PC (15 May 1871 – 24 November 1940) was a British Conservative politician who served in a number of ministerial positions in the inter-war years.

== Early life ==
George Clement Tryon was son of Vice-Admiral Sir George Tryon and Clementina Heathcote, daughter of Gilbert Heathcote, 1st Baron Aveland.

Educated at Eton College and the Royal Military College, Sandhurst, Tryon joined the Grenadier Guards in 1890, serving for sixteen years before retiring as major.

He was elected a Fellow of the Royal Statistical Society in February 1903.

== Career ==
Tryon was elected as Member of Parliament (MP) for Brighton in 1910, serving until 1940. He became Under-Secretary of Air in 1919 and Parliamentary Secretary to the Ministry of Pensions in 1920 and in 1922 became a Privy Counsellor. He served as Minister of Pensions himself 1922–24, 1924–29 and 1931–35 and was then appointed Postmaster General in 1935, serving until 1940. He was one of those to appear on the first day of BBC television broadcasts, 2 November 1936.

In April 1940, Tryon was elevated to the peerage as Baron Tryon, of Durnford in the County of Wilts and made Chancellor of the Duchy of Lancaster and First Commissioner of Works. However, he was replaced as Chancellor (by Lord Hankey) when Winston Churchill became prime minister in May, while retaining the First Commissionership; he relinquished that post the following October, a few weeks before his death, aged 69.

== Personal life ==
He married Averil Vivian, daughter of Colonel Sir Henry Hussey Vivian, 1st Baron Swansea. They had two children, including Charles, 2nd Baron Tryon.

== Arms ==
Coat of arms of George Tryon, 1st Baron Tryon
Crest Issuant from a coronet composed of four roses set upon a rim Or a bear's head Sable charged with seven stars in the form of the Constellation Ursa Major Gold Escutcheon Azure a fess embattled between in chief three estoiles and in base a portcullis chained Or. Supporters Dexter an army pensioner in hospital uniform sinister a postman holding with the exterior hand a letter sack over his shoulder Proper. Motto Do Right And Fear Not

Parliament of the United Kingdom
Preceded by Ernest Villiers; Aurelian Ridsdale	Member of Parliament for Brighton; 1910–1940; Served alongside: Walter Rice 1910–1911; John Gordon 1911–1914; Charles Thomas-Stanford 1914–1922; Cooper Rawson 1922–1940	Succeeded by Cooper Rawson; Lord Erskine
Political offices
Preceded by Ian Macpherson	Minister of Pensions; 1922–1924	Succeeded by Frederick Roberts
Preceded by Frederick Roberts	Minister of Pensions; 1924–1929	Succeeded by Frederick Roberts
Preceded by Frederick Roberts	Minister of Pensions; 1931–1935	Succeeded by Robert Hudson
Preceded by Sir Kingsley Wood	Postmaster General; 1935–1940	Succeeded by William Morrison
Preceded by William Morrison	Chancellor of the Duchy of Lancaster; 1940	Succeeded by The Lord Hankey
Preceded by The Earl De La Warr	First Commissioner of Works; 1940	Succeeded by Sir John Reith
Peerage of the United Kingdom
New creation	Baron Tryon; 1940	Succeeded by Charles Tryon
