= William Tindal Robertson =

English physician

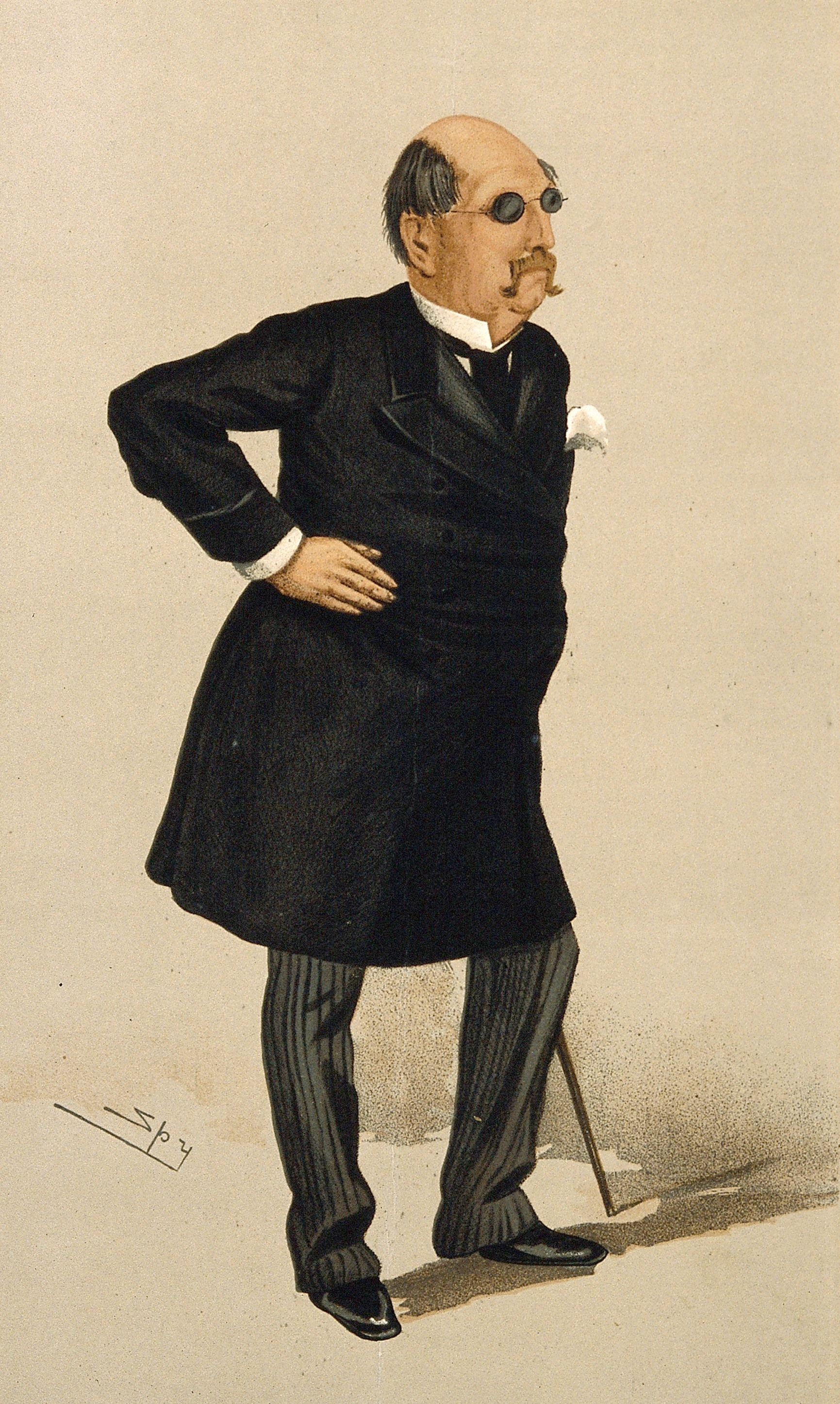
"Brighton" Robertson as caricatured by Spy (Leslie Ward) in Vanity Fair, February 1889

Sir William Tindal Robertson (1825 – 6 October 1889), was an English physician. He represented Brighton in Parliament from 29 November 1886 – 25 October 1889.

He was the eldest son of Frederick Fowler Robertson of Bath, and of Anne his wife née Tindal. He was educated at The King's School, Grantham, and he afterwards became a pupil of Dr. H. P. Robarts of Great Coram Street, and a student of University College, London. He matriculated at London University in 1846, but did not take a degree.

He obtained a license to practise from the Apothecaries' Company in 1848, and was admitted a member of the Royal College of Surgeons of England in 1850. He acted as resident medical officer at the Middlesex Hospital in 1848–9, and he became a resident surgeon to the Royal Free Hospital in 1850. He afterwards went to Paris to complete his medical studies, and in 1853 he graduated M.D. at Edinburgh, presenting the thesis On Asiatic cholera.

He established a medical practice in Nottingham in the following year, and in 1855 married Elizabeth Ann, daughter of John Leavers, cotton spinner of The Park, Nottingham. For nearly twenty years he acted as physician to the Nottingham General Hospital. Robertson was largely responsible for making Nottingham a major teaching hospital by introducing the Oxford local examinations.

Robertson was also involved in the public life of Nottingham: he was member of the town council, helped to start the local Literary and Philosophical Society and in the foundation of the Robin Hood Rifles, a unit of the Volunteer Force. He was a member of Nottingham Town Council. He delivered the address on medicine at the meeting of the British Medical Association in Nottingham in 1857, and acted as a local secretary when the British Association met in the town in 1866.

In The Lancet in July, 1867, he publicly commented on the conflict of interest inherent to the practice of arbitration by medical examiners employed by railways to assess and compensate injuries sustained in accidents. To his credit, he had ceased this type of work because of the professional conflict that the compensation scheme created in the medical examiner. This is an early example of professionalism being a natural antidote to the moral hazard created in the principal-agent interactions of independent medical examiners.

His eyesight began to fail, and he became blind from glaucoma in 1873, and in 1874 he was elected a fellow of the Royal College of Physicians of London. He retired from medicine, moving to Brighton in 1876, where he was elected to the town council and was a justice of the peace for Brighton and Sussex. The chairman of the Brighton Conservative and Constitutional Association, when the sitting member of parliament, David Smith, died in 1886 he was unanimously selected by the local party to contest the vacant seat. He was elected unopposed.

A member of the Royal Commission on the Blind, the Deaf and the Dumb, he was rewarded for his work on the body with a knighthood in 1888.

In the last weeks of his life he suffered from severe depression, and he killed himself by cutting his throat with a razor at his Kemp Town, Brighton residence in October 1889. He was cremated at Woking, Surrey and his ashes placed in the family vault at Brighton.

Parliament of the United Kingdom
Preceded by David Smith; William Thackeray Marriott	Member of Parliament for Brighton; 1886 – 1889; With: William Thackeray Marriott	Succeeded by Gerald Loder; William Thackeray Marriott
