= Brighton (constituency) =

Former parliamentary constituency in the United Kingdom

- Former borough constituency for the House of Commons
- County: 1832–1888: Sussex; 1888–1950: East Sussex
- Major settlements: Brighton

1832–1950
- Seats: Two
- Created from: Sussex
- Replaced by: Brighton Kemptown, Brighton Pavilion and Hove

Brighton was a parliamentary constituency of the House of Commons of the Parliament of the United Kingdom from 1832 until it was divided into single-member seats from the 1950 general election. Covering the seaside towns of Brighton and Hove in East Sussex, it elected two Members of Parliament (MP) by the block vote system of election.

== History ==
The constituency was created by the Reform Act 1832 for the 1832 general election. The constituency was based on the south coast seaside resort town of Brighton.

When it was proposed to enfranchise Brighton a Tory observed in Parliament that it would represent merely "toffy (sic), lemonade and jelly shops". Charles Seymour suggests he "obviously feared the Whig proclivities of the numerous tradespeople established there".

The first representatives of the constituency were of radical opinions. Isaac Newton Wigney (MP 1832–1839 and 1841–1842) was described as being of "Whig opinions inclining to radicalism, in favour of the ballot, and pledged himself to resign his seat whenever his constituents called upon him so to do". His colleague, the Nonconformist preacher and attorney George Faithfull (MP 1832–1835), went much further. He advocated "the immediate abolition of slavery, of all unmerited pensions and sinecures, the standing army, all useless expense, the Corn Laws, and every other monopoly. He said that if the extent of suffrage at that time was not found efficient he would vote for universal suffrage: and if triennial Parliaments did not succeed, would vote for having them annually; he was an advocate of the ballot".

Seymour provides figures for the voting qualification of Brighton electors, following the Reform Act 1867. The town was one of six boroughs in England where the £10 occupiers, enfranchised in 1832, were much more numerous than the householders who received the vote under the 1867 Act. There were 7,590 £10 occupiers and only 944 householders on the electoral register.

Members of Parliament for the constituency, after the first two, were of more conventional views; but most elections were won by the Liberal Party until 1884. In 1884 the Liberal MP, William Marriott, broke with his party as he disagreed with Prime Minister Gladstone's foreign and Egyptian policy. Marriott resigned his seat and was re-elected as a Conservative. From that time onwards the Liberal Party never won an election in the constituency, except for a by-election in 1905 and both seats in the landslide victory of 1906. Apart from those few years of liberal strength, Brighton became a safe Conservative constituency.

The 1931 election of Sir Cooper Rawson holds the record for the largest majority ever received at a general election (62,253), as well as the most votes received by an individual (75,205).

== Boundaries ==
The constituency was defined in the Parliamentary Boundaries Act 1832 as comprising the "respective Parishes of Brighthelmstone and Hove". The act named the parliamentary borough as "Brighthelmstone", but the name "Brighton" was invariably used.

The two parishes were adjacent coastal resorts in the historic county of Sussex in South East England. Brighton obtained a charter of incorporation to become a municipal borough in 1854, while Hove formed a local board of health in 1858, becoming a borough forty years later. These changes in local government made no changes to the boundaries of the constituency. Under the Representation of the People Act 1867 the constituency was enlarged to include the Preston area which fell inside Brighton's municipal boundaries.

These boundaries were used until the 1918 general election when seats were redefined in terms of the local government areas then in existence. The parliamentary borough was defined as consisting of the County Borough of Brighton and the Municipal Borough of Hove. The constituency was enlarged to include Aldrington which lay with Hove's borough boundaries.

Under the Representation of the People Act 1948 the remaining multi-member constituencies were abolished and replaced with single-member ones from the 1950 election. The County Borough of Brighton was divided into Brighton Kemptown and Brighton Pavilion. The Municipal Borough of Hove, which had also been included in the old Brighton seat was combined with Portslade by Sea Urban District to form the new Hove constituency.

== Members of Parliament ==
Election	1st Member	1st Party	2nd Member	2nd Party
1832	Isaac Wigney	Radical	George Faithfull	Radical
1835	Isaac Wigney	Radical	George Pechell (from 1849 Sir George Brook-Pechell, Bt)	Whig
1837	Sir Adolphus Dalrymple	Conservative	George Pechell (from 1849 Sir George Brook-Pechell, Bt)	Whig
1841	Isaac Wigney	Radical	George Pechell (from 1849 Sir George Brook-Pechell, Bt)	Whig
1842	Lord Alfred Hervey	Conservative	George Pechell (from 1849 Sir George Brook-Pechell, Bt)	Whig
1857	William Coningham	Radical	George Pechell (from 1849 Sir George Brook-Pechell, Bt)	Whig
1860	William Coningham	Liberal	James White	Liberal
1864	Henry Moor	Conservative	James White	Liberal
1865	Henry Fawcett	Liberal	James White	Liberal
1874	James Lloyd Ashbury	Conservative	Charles Cameron Shute	Conservative
1880	John Robert Hollond	Liberal	Rt Hon. Sir William Thackeray Marriott ^{1}	Liberal
1884	John Robert Hollond	Liberal	Rt Hon. Sir William Thackeray Marriott ^{1}	Conservative
1885	David Smith	Conservative	Rt Hon. Sir William Thackeray Marriott ^{1}	Conservative
1886	Sir William Tindal Robertson	Conservative	Rt Hon. Sir William Thackeray Marriott ^{1}	Conservative
1889	Gerald Loder	Conservative	Rt Hon. Sir William Thackeray Marriott ^{1}	Conservative
1893	Gerald Loder	Conservative	Bruce Vernon-Wentworth	Conservative
1905 (5 April 1905)	Ernest Villiers	Liberal	Bruce Vernon-Wentworth	Conservative
1906	Ernest Villiers	Liberal	Aurelian Ridsdale	Liberal
1910	Rt Hon. George Tryon	Conservative	Hon. Walter Rice	Conservative
1911	Rt Hon. George Tryon	Conservative	John Gordon	Conservative
1914	Rt Hon. George Tryon	Conservative	Charles Thomas-Stanford	Conservative
1918	Rt Hon. George Tryon	Coalition Conservative	Charles Thomas-Stanford	Coalition Conservative
1922	Rt Hon. George Tryon	Conservative	Cooper Rawson	Conservative
1940	Lord Erskine ^{2}	Conservative	Cooper Rawson	Conservative
1941	Anthony Marlowe	Conservative	Cooper Rawson	Conservative
1944	Anthony Marlowe	Conservative	William Teeling	Conservative
1950	constituency divided – see Brighton Kemptown, Brighton Pavilion and Hove			

Notes:-

- ^{1} Marriott resigned his seat as a Liberal MP in February 1884, because of dissatisfaction with the foreign and Egyptian policy of the Liberal government. He was re-elected in March 1884 as a Conservative candidate.
- ^{2} Lord Erskine was a courtesy title. He was the heir apparent of The 12th Earl of Mar and 14th Earl of Kellie, but as he died before his father he never inherited the hereditary titles of his family.

== Elections ==
1940s – 1930s – 1920s – 1910s – 1900s – 1890s – 1880s – 1870s – 1860s – 1850s – 1840s – 1830s – See also – Notes – Further reading – References

=== Elections in the 1940s ===
1945 general election: Brighton
Party	Candidate	Votes	%	±%
Conservative	William Teeling	49,339	30.8	−7.4
Conservative	Anthony Marlowe	49,026	30.6	−7.4
Labour	Joseph Taylor Huddart	31,074	19.4	+7.3
Labour	GH Barnard	30,844	19.2	+7.5
Majority		17,952	11.2	−14.7
Turnout		160,283	64.3	+2.6
Registered electors		124,714		
Conservative hold				
Conservative hold				

1944 Brighton by-election
Party	Candidate	Votes	%	±%
Conservative	William Teeling	14,594	53.6	−22.6
National Independent	Bruce Dutton Briant	12,635	46.4	New
Majority		1,959	7.2	−18.7
Turnout		27,229	22.1	−39.6
Registered electors		123,310		
Conservative hold				

1941 Brighton by-election
Party	Candidate	Votes	%	±%
Conservative	Anthony Marlowe	Unopposed		
Conservative hold				

1940 Brighton by-election
Party	Candidate	Votes	%	±%
Conservative	John Erskine	Unopposed		
Conservative hold				

Back to Elections

=== Elections in the 1930s ===
General election 1935: Brighton
Party	Candidate	Votes	%	±%
Conservative	George Tryon	60,913	38.2	−4.5
Conservative	Cooper Rawson	60,724	38.0	−4.6
Labour	Alban Gordon	19,287	12.1	+4.7
Labour	Lewis Cohen	18,743	11.7	+4.4
Majority		41,437	25.9	−9.3
Turnout		159,667	61.7	−6.6
Registered electors		129,356		
Conservative hold				
Conservative hold				

General election 1931: Brighton
Party	Candidate	Votes	%	±%
Conservative	Cooper Rawson	75,205	42.7	+13.6
Conservative	George Tryon	74,993	42.6	+13.6
Labour	Lewis Cohen	12,952	7.4	−4.8
Labour Co-op	Rosalind Moore	12,878	7.3	−4.4
Majority		62,041	35.2	+18.4
Turnout		176,028	68.3	+3.2
Registered electors		128,779		
Conservative hold				
Conservative hold				

Back to Elections

=== Elections in the 1920s ===
Cyril Dallow

General election 1929: Brighton
Party	Candidate	Votes	%	±%
Unionist	Cooper Rawson	46,515	29.1	−13.2
Unionist	George Tryon	46,287	29.0	−13.5
Labour	Laurence S Cheshire	19,494	12.2	−3.0
Labour	William McLaine	18,770	11.7	N/A
Liberal	Cyril Berkeley Dallow	14,770	9.3	New
Liberal	John Brudenell-Bruce	13,816	8.7	New
Majority		26,793	16.8	−10.3
Turnout		159,652	65.1	+9.9
Registered electors		122,641		
Unionist hold				
Unionist hold				

General election 1924: Brighton
Party	Candidate	Votes	%	±%
Unionist	George Tryon	39,387	42.5	+15.7
Unionist	Cooper Rawson	39,253	42.3	+15.8
Labour	Alban Gordon	14,072	15.2	+6.7
Majority		25,181	27.1	+16.1
Turnout		92,712	55.2	−13.0
Registered electors		83,980		
Unionist hold				
Unionist hold				

General election 1923: Brighton
Party	Candidate	Votes	%	±%
Unionist	George Tryon	30,137	26.8	−5.2
Unionist	Cooper Rawson	29,759	26.5	−3.5
Liberal	Walter Runciman	17,462	15.5	−9.2
Liberal	Henry Lunn	16,567	14.7	N/A
Labour	Alban Gordon	9,545	8.5	New
Labour	Herbert Carden	9,040	8.0	New
Majority		12,297	11.0	+5.7
Turnout		112,510	68.2	+12.8
Registered electors		82,475		
Unionist hold				
Unionist hold				

Fry

General election 1922: Brighton
Party	Candidate	Votes	%	±%
Unionist	George Tryon	28,549	32.0	−7.7
Unionist	Cooper Rawson	26,844	30.0	−9.2
Liberal	C. B. Fry	22,059	24.7	N/A
Ind. Unionist	Harry Wheater	11,913	13.3	New
Majority		4,785	5.3	−23.1
Turnout		89,365	55.4	+5.1
Registered electors		80,674		
Unionist hold				
Unionist hold				

Back to Elections

=== Elections in the 1910s ===
General election 1918: Brighton (Note: Results compared to the 1910 general election, not the later by-elections)
Party		Candidate	Votes	%	±%
C	Unionist	George Tryon	32,958	39.7	+8.9
C	Unionist	Charles Thomas-Stanford	32,561	39.2	+8.4
	Labour	Thomas Lewis	8,971	10.8	New
	Labour	George William Alfred Canter	8,514	10.3	New
Majority			23,590	28.4	+16.8
Turnout			83,004	50.3	−31.6
Registered electors			82,449		
	Unionist hold				
	Unionist hold				
C indicates candidate endorsed by the coalition government.

1914 Brighton by-election (Note: Held due to Gordon's resignation)
Party	Candidate	Votes	%	±%
Unionist	Charles Thomas-Stanford	Unopposed		
Unionist hold				

1911 Brighton by-election (Note: Held due to Rice's elevation to the House of Lords)
Party	Candidate	Votes	%	±%
Conservative	John Gordon	Unopposed		
Conservative hold				

General election December 1910: Brighton
Party	Candidate	Votes	%	±%
Conservative	George Tryon	10,780	30.8	+0.4
Conservative	Walter Rice	10,757	30.8	+0.5
Liberal	Alfred Morris	6,723	19.2	−0.5
Liberal	Morres Nickalls	6,699	19.2	−0.4
Majority		4,034	11.6	+1.0
Turnout		4,034	81.9	−7.4
Registered electors		21,427		
Conservative hold				
Conservative hold				

General election January 1910: Brighton
Party	Candidate	Votes	%	±%
Conservative	George Tryon	11,625	30.4	+6.6
Conservative	Walter Rice	11,567	30.3	+6.5
Liberal	George Evatt	7,506	19.7	−6.7
Liberal	Morres Nickalls	7,472	19.6	−6.4
Majority		4,153	10.8	N/A
Majority		4,061	10.6	N/A
Turnout		38,170	89.3	+6.8
Registered electors		21,427		
Conservative gain from Liberal				
Conservative gain from Liberal				

Back to Elections

=== Elections in the 1900s ===
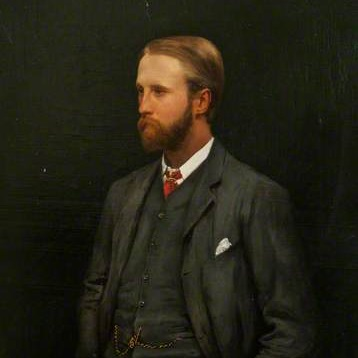
Ridsdale

General election 1906: Brighton (Note: Compared to the 1900 general election, not the 1905 by-election)
Party	Candidate	Votes	%	±%
Liberal	Ernest Villiers	9,062	26.4	N/A
Liberal	Aurelian Ridsdale	8,919	26.0	N/A
Conservative	George Tryon	8,188	23.8	−17.1
Conservative	John Gordon	8,176	23.8	−10.8
Majority		731	2.2	N/A
Majority		886	2.6	N/A
Turnout		34,345	82.5	+20.3
Registered electors		20,976		
Liberal gain from Conservative				
Liberal gain from Conservative				

Villiers

1905 Brighton by-election (Note: Held due to Loder's appointment as Lord Commissioner of the Treasury)
Party	Candidate	Votes	%	±%
Liberal	Ernest Villiers	8,209	52.6	New
Conservative	Gerald Loder	7,392	47.4	−28.1
Majority		817	5.2	N/A
Turnout		15,601	76.3	+14.1
Registered electors		20,439		
Liberal gain from Conservative				

General election 1900: Brighton
Party	Candidate	Votes	%	±%
Conservative	Gerald Loder	7,858	40.9	+2.4
Conservative	Bruce Vernon-Wentworth	6,626	34.6	−2.0
Independent Protestant	John Kensit	4,693	24.5	New
Majority		1,933	10.1	−1.6
Turnout		19,177	62.2	−12.2
Registered electors		18,634		
Conservative hold				
Conservative hold				

Back to Elections

=== Elections in the 1890s ===
General election 1895: Brighton (Note: Results compared to the 1892 general election, not the later by-election)
Party	Candidate	Votes	%	±%
Conservative	Gerald Loder	7,878	38.5	+0.2
Conservative	Bruce Vernon-Wentworth	7,490	36.6	+1.6
Liberal	Joseph Ewart	5,082	24.9	−1.8
Majority		2,408	11.7	+3.4
Turnout		20,450	74.4	−1.8
Registered electors		17,083		
Conservative hold				
Conservative hold				

By-election, 14 December 1893 (Note: Held due to Marriott's resignation)
Party	Candidate	Votes	%	±%
Conservative	Bruce Vernon-Wentworth	Unopposed		
Conservative hold				

General election 1892: Brighton (Note: Results compared to the 1886 general election, not the later by-elections)
Party	Candidate	Votes	%	±%
Conservative	Gerald Loder	7,807	38.3	−2.9
Conservative	William Thackeray Marriott	7,134	35.0	−5.6
Liberal	Frederick William Maude	5,448	26.7	+8.5
Majority		1,686	8.3	−14.1
Turnout		20,389	76.2	+18.4
Registered electors		16,883		
Conservative hold				
Conservative hold				

Back to Elections

=== Elections in the 1880s ===
1889 Brighton by-election (Note: Held due to Robertson's death)
Party	Candidate	Votes	%	±%
Conservative	Gerald Loder	7,132	60.7	−21.1
Liberal	Robert Peel	4,625	39.3	+21.1
Majority		2,507	21.4	−1.0
Turnout		11,757	76.8	+19.0
Registered electors		15,307		
Conservative hold		Swing	−21.1	

By-election, 29 November 1886 (Note: Held due to Smith's death)
Party	Candidate	Votes	%	±%
Conservative	William Tindal Robertson	Unopposed		
Conservative hold				

By-election, 11 August 1886 (Note: Held due to Marriott's appointment as Judge-Advocate-General)
Party	Candidate	Votes	%	±%
Conservative	William Thackeray Marriott	Unopposed		
Conservative hold				

General election 1886: Brighton
Party	Candidate	Votes	%	±%
Conservative	David Smith	5,963	41.2	+11.7
Conservative	William Thackeray Marriott	5,875	40.6	+11.1
Liberal	William Hall	2,633	18.2	−22.8
Majority		3,242	22.4	+13.5
Turnout		8,577	57.8	−23.2
Registered electors		14,848		
Conservative hold				
Conservative hold				

General election 1885: Brighton
Party	Candidate	Votes	%	±%
Conservative	William Thackeray Marriott	7,047	29.5	+4.8
Conservative	David Smith	7,019	29.5	+5.2
Liberal	John Webb Probyn	4,899	20.6	−4.9
Liberal	John Robert Hollond	4,865	20.4	−5.2
Majority		2,182	9.1	N/A
Majority		2,120	8.9	N/A
Turnout		12,021	81.0	+3.8 (est)
Registered electors		14,848		
Conservative gain from Liberal		Swing	+4.9	
Conservative gain from Liberal		Swing	+5.2	

By-election, 10 Jul 1885: Brighton
Party	Candidate	Votes	%	±%
Conservative	William Thackeray Marriott	Unopposed		
Conservative gain from Liberal				

- Caused by Marriott's appointment as Judge Advocate General of the Armed Forces.

By-election, 3 Mar 1884: Brighton
Party	Candidate	Votes	%	±%
Conservative	William Thackeray Marriott	5,478	57.7	+8.7
Liberal	Robert Romer	4,021	42.3	−8.8
Majority		1,457	15.4	N/A
Turnout		9,499	71.2	−6.0 (est)
Registered electors		13,340		
Conservative gain from Liberal		Swing	+8.8	

- Caused by Marriott's decision to seek re-election as a Conservative.

General election 1880: Brighton
Party	Candidate	Votes	%	±%
Liberal	John Robert Hollond	4,913	25.6	+3.1
Liberal	William Thackeray Marriott	4,904	25.5	+4.4
Conservative	James Lloyd Ashbury	4,739	24.7	−4.8
Conservative	Edward Field	4,664	24.3	−2.6
Majority		249	1.3	N/A
Majority		165	0.8	N/A
Turnout		9,610 (est)	77.2 (est)	+4.5
Registered electors		12,454		
Liberal gain from Conservative		Swing	+4.0	
Liberal gain from Conservative		Swing	+3.5	

Back to Elections

=== Elections in the 1870s ===
General election 1874: Brighton
Party	Candidate	Votes	%	±%
Conservative	James Lloyd Ashbury	4,393	29.5	+3.0
Conservative	Charles Cameron Shute	3,995	26.9	+15.7
Liberal	James White	3,351	22.5	−7.9
Liberal	Henry Fawcett	3,130	21.1	−6.9
Majority		1,263	9.4	N/A
Majority		644	4.4	N/A
Turnout		7,435 (est)	72.7 (est)	+9.2
Registered electors		10,228		
Conservative gain from Liberal		Swing	+5.5	
Conservative gain from Liberal		Swing	+11.3	

Back to Elections

=== Elections in the 1860s ===
General election 1868: Brighton
Party	Candidate	Votes	%	±%
Liberal	James White	3,342	30.4	−8.6
Liberal	Henry Fawcett	3,081	28.0	−5.9
Conservative	James Lloyd Ashbury	2,917	26.5	+12.9
Conservative	Henry Moor	1,232	11.2	−2.4
Liberal	William Coningham	432	3.9	N/A
Majority		164	1.5	−5.3
Turnout		5,502 (est)	63.5 (est)	−20.1
Registered electors		10,228		
Liberal hold		Swing	−10.8	
Liberal hold		Swing	−1.8	

General election 1865: Brighton
Party	Candidate	Votes	%	±%
Liberal	James White	3,065	39.0	−1.3
Liberal	Henry Fawcett	2,665	33.9	−2.7
Conservative	Henry Moor	2,134	27.1	+4.0
Majority		531	6.8	−6.7
Turnout		4,999 (est)	83.6 (est)	+0.8
Registered electors		5,978		
Liberal hold		Swing	−1.7	
Liberal hold		Swing	−2.4	

By-election, 16 Feb 1864: Brighton
Party	Candidate	Votes	%	±%
Conservative	Henry Moor	1,663	39.3	+16.2
Liberal	Henry Fawcett	1,468	34.7	N/A
Liberal	Julian Goldsmid	775	18.3	N/A
Liberal	Francis Kuper Dumas	246	5.8	N/A
Independent	Edward Harper	82	1.9	New
Majority		195	4.6	N/A
Turnout		4,234	77.9	−4.9
Registered electors		5,434		
Conservative gain from Liberal		Swing		

- Caused by Coningham's resignation.

By-election, 16 Jul 1860: Brighton
Party	Candidate	Votes	%	±%
Liberal	James White	1,588	47.0	+6.7
Conservative	Henry Moor	1,242	36.8	+13.7
Liberal	Frederick Goldsmid	548	16.2	−20.4
Majority		346	10.2	−3.3
Turnout		3,378	70.6	−12.2
Registered electors		4,786		
Liberal hold		Swing		

- Caused by Pechell's death.

Back to Elections

=== Elections in the 1850s ===
General election 1859: Brighton
Party	Candidate	Votes	%	±%
Liberal	George Brooke-Pechell	2,322	40.3	−3.0
Liberal	William Coningham	2,106	36.6	+0.5
Conservative	Allan MacNab	1,327	23.1	+2.6
Majority		779	13.5	−2.1
Turnout		3,541 (est)	82.8 (est)	+2.3
Registered electors		4,277		
Liberal hold		Swing	−2.2	
Liberal hold		Swing	−0.4	

General election 1857: Brighton
Party	Candidate	Votes	%	±%
Whig	George Brooke-Pechell	2,278	43.3	+1.9
Radical	William Coningham	1,900	36.1	+8.3
Conservative	Alfred Hervey	1,080	20.5	−10.3
Turnout		3,169 (est)	80.5 (est)	−2.2
Registered electors		3,936		
Majority		378	7.2	−3.4
Whig hold		Swing	+3.5	
Majority		820	15.6	N/A
Radical gain from Conservative		Swing	+6.7	

By-election, 4 January 1853: Brighton
Party	Candidate	Votes	%	±%
Conservative	Alfred Hervey	Unopposed		
Conservative hold				

- Caused by Hervey's appointment as a Lord Commissioner of the Treasury

General election 1852: Brighton
Party	Candidate	Votes	%	±%
Whig	George Brooke-Pechell	1,924	41.4	−1.1
Conservative	Alfred Hervey	1,431	30.8	−2.7
Radical	John Salusbury-Trelawny	1,173	25.2	+13.2
Radical	John Ffooks	119	2.6	−9.4
Turnout		3,039 (est)	82.7 (est)	+16.1
Registered electors		3,675		
Majority		493	10.6	+1.6
Whig hold		Swing	−1.5	
Majority		258	5.6	−3.9
Conservative hold		Swing	−2.3	

Back to Elections

=== Elections in the 1840s ===
General election, 30 July 1847: Brighton (2 seats)
Party	Candidate	Votes	%	±%
Whig	George Pechell	1,571	42.5	+2.1
Conservative	Alfred Hervey	1,239	33.5	+9.1
Radical	William Coningham	886	24.0	−12.6
Turnout		1,848 (est)	66.6 (est)	−18.7
Registered electors		2,776		
Majority		332	9.0	+3.2
Whig hold		Swing	−1.2	
Majority		353	9.5	N/A
Conservative gain from Radical		Swing	+7.7	

By-election, 6 May 1842: Brighton
Party	Candidate	Votes	%	±%
Conservative	Alfred Hervey	1,277	66.1	+41.7
Radical	Summers Harford	640	33.1	−1.5
Chartist	Charles Brooker	16	0.8	+0.3
Majority		637	33.0	N/A
Turnout		1,933	76.3	−9.0
Registered electors		2,533		
Conservative gain from Radical		Swing	+21.6	

- Caused by Wigney's resignation by accepting the office of Steward of the Chiltern Hundreds after he was declared bankrupt

General election, 1 July 1841: Brighton (2 seats)
Party	Candidate	Votes	%	±%
Whig	George Pechell	1,443	40.4	+2.9
Radical	Isaac Wigney	1,235	34.6	+0.5
Conservative	Adolphus Dalrymple	872	24.4	−4.0
Chartist	Charles Brooker	19	0.5	New
Turnout		2,050	85.3	+2.0
Registered electors		2,403		
Majority		208	5.8	−3.3
Whig hold		Swing	+2.5	
Majority		363	10.2	N/A
Radical gain from Conservative		Swing	+1.3	

Back to Elections

=== Elections in the 1830s ===
General election, 26 July 1837: Brighton (2 seats)
Party	Candidate	Votes	%	±%
Whig	George Pechell	1,083	37.5	−2.0
Conservative	Adolphus Dalrymple	819	28.4	+8.6
Radical	Isaac Wigney	801	27.8	+6.3
Radical	George Faithfull	183	6.3	−12.9
Turnout		1,640	83.3	−6.7
Registered electors		1,968		
Majority		264	9.1	−11.2
Whig hold		Swing	+0.7	
Majority		18	0.6	N/A
Conservative gain from Radical		Swing	+6.0	

General election, 8 & 9 January 1835: Brighton (2 seats)
Party	Candidate	Votes	%	±%
Whig	George Pechell	961	39.5	+1.3
Radical	Isaac Wigney	523	21.5	−11.7
Conservative	Adolphus Dalrymple	483	19.8	+18.6
Radical	George Faithfull	467	19.2	−8.2
Turnout		1,382	90.0	+3.0
Registered electors		1,535		
Majority		494	20.3	N/A
Whig gain from Radical		Swing	+5.6	
Majority		40	1.7	−2.4
Radical hold		Swing	−10.5	

General election, 12 December 1832: Brighton (2 seats)
Party	Candidate	Votes	%	±%
Radical	Isaac Wigney	873	33.2	
Radical	George Faithfull	722	27.4	
Whig	George Pechell	613	23.3	
Whig	William Crawford	391	14.9	
Tory	Adolphus Dalrymple	32	1.2	
Majority		109	4.1	
Turnout		1,434	87.0	
Registered electors		1,649		
Radical win (new seat)				
Radical win (new seat)				

Back to Elections

== See also ==
- List of former United Kingdom Parliament constituencies
