= 1842 Brighton by-election =

UK parliamentary by-election

The 1842 Brighton by-election was held on 5 May 1842 after the resignation of the incumbent Whig MP Isaac Newton Wigney. The seat was gained by the Conservative MP Lord Alfred Hervey.

Brighton by-election, 6 May 1842
Party	Candidate	Votes	%	±%
Conservative	Lord Alfred Hervey	1,277	66.1	+41.7
Radical	Summers Harford	640	33.1	−1.5
Chartist	Charles Brooker	16	0.8	+0.3
Independent	Nicholson	0	0.0	New
Majority		637	33.0	N/A
Turnout		1,933	76.3	−9.0
Conservative gain from Whig		Swing	+21.6	
