= Gerald Loder, 1st Baron Wakehurst =

British politician (1861–1936)

The Right Honourable The Lord Wakehurst JP DL
- Photograph of Loder, 1895

Member of Parliament for Brighton
- In office 1889–1905 Serving with Sir William Marriott, Bruce Vernon-Wentworth
- Preceded by: Sir William Thackeray Marriott; Sir William Tindal Robertson
- Succeeded by: Bruce Vernon-Wentworth; Ernest Villiers

Personal details
- Born: Gerald Walter Erskine Loder; 25 October 1861
- Died: 30 April 1936 (aged 74)
- Party: Conservative
- Spouse: Lady Louise de Vere Beauclerk (m. 1890; died 1936)
- Relations: Edmund Giles Loder (brother); Hans Busk (grandfather)
- Children: 5
- Parent(s): Sir Robert Loder, 1st Baronet; Maria Georgiana Busk
- Education: Eton College
- Alma mater: Trinity College, Cambridge

Gerald Walter Erskine Loder, 1st Baron Wakehurst, JP DL LLB (25 October 1861 – 30 April 1936) was a British barrister, businessman and Conservative politician. He is best remembered for developing the gardens at Wakehurst Place, Sussex.

== Early life ==
Loder was born on 25 October 1861 as the fourth son of Sir Robert Loder, 1st Baronet, Member of Parliament for New Shoreham, and Maria Georgiana Busk (fourth daughter of Welsh poet Hans Busk). Among his siblings were Sir Edmund Giles Loder, 2nd Baronet and Etheldreda Mary Loder (wife of Sir Charles Burrell, 6th Baronet).

He was educated at Eton and Trinity College, Cambridge. He became a barrister at the Inner Temple in 1888.

== Career ==
Loder was Conservative Member of Parliament for Brighton from 1889 to 1905. He was private secretary to the President of the Local Government Board (Charles Ritchie) from 1888 to 1892 and to Lord George Hamilton (the Secretary of State for India) from 1896 to 1901. He served briefly under Arthur Balfour as a Lord of the Treasury in 1905.

A keen gardener, Loder purchased the Wakehurst Place estate in 1903 and spent 33 years developing the gardens, which today cover some two square kilometres (500 acres) and are owned by the National Trust. He was president of the Royal Arboricultural Society from 1926 to 1927 and president of the Royal Horticultural Society from 1929 to 1931. He was a director of the London, Brighton and South Coast Railway from 1896, and served as its last chairman in December 1922. He was a director of its successor, the Southern Railway, and later chairman from 1934 until his resignation in December 1934.

In June 1934 he was raised to the peerage as Baron Wakehurst, of Ardingly in the County of Sussex.

== Personal life ==
In 1890, Loder married Lady Louise de Vere Beauclerk (1869–1958), eldest daughter of William Beauclerk, 10th Duke of St Albans and his first wife, Sybil Mary Grey (a daughter of Lt.-Gen. Sir Charles Grey). The couple had one son and four daughters:

- John de Vere Loder, 2nd Baron Wakehurst (1895–1970), who married Margaret Tennant (daughter of industrialist Sir Charles Tennant, 1st Baronet and sister of prominent figures of Victorian and Edwardian London, such as Margot Asquith and Edward Tennant, 2nd Baron Glenconner).
- The Hon. Dorothy Cicely Sybil Loder (1896–1986), who married the Hon. William Palmer (son of the Earl and Countess of Selborne, and grandson of Prime Minister Lord Salisbury).
- The Hon. Victoria Helen Loder (1899–1979), who married Alan Rees Colman.
- The Hon. Diana Evelyn Loder (1899–1985), who married Donald Howard, 3rd Baron Strathcona and Mount Royal.
- The Hon. Mary Irene Loder (1902–1970).

Lord Wakehurst died in April 1936, aged 74, and was succeeded in the barony by his only son, John. The Loder Cup, New Zealand's oldest conservation award, is named after Lord Wakehurst.

Parliament of the United Kingdom
Preceded by Sir William Thackeray Marriott; Sir William Tindal Robertson	Member of Parliament for Brighton; 1889 – 1905; With: Sir William Marriott 1889–1893; Bruce Vernon-Wentworth 1893–1905	Succeeded by Bruce Vernon-Wentworth; Ernest Villiers
Party political offices
Preceded by Sir Benjamin Stone	Chairman of the National Union of Conservative and Constitutional Associations; 1899	Succeeded by Lord Windsor
Business positions
Preceded by Charles C. Macrae	Chairman of the Board of Directors of the London, Brighton and South Coast Railway; December 1922	Company merged into Southern Railway
Preceded by The Hon. Everard Baring	Chairman of the Board of Director of the Southern Railway; 1932–1934	Succeeded by Robert Holland-Martin
Peerage of the United Kingdom
New creation	Baron Wakehurst; 1934 – 1936	Succeeded by John de Vere Loder
