= 1941 Brighton by-election =

UK Parliamentary by-election

The 1941 Brighton by-election was held on 15 November 1941. The by-election was held due to the resignation of the incumbent Conservative MP, Lord Erskine. It was won by the Conservative candidate Anthony Marlowe, who was unopposed.
