= David Smith (British Conservative politician) =

David Smith (1826 – 3 November 1886) was an English businessman and Conservative politician.

Smith was the son of Alexander Smith of Manor House, Camberwell and his wife née Richardson. Born in London, Smith was educated in Scotland. He entered business as a colonial merchant. Smith married Elise Spencer of Dublin. He lived at Arundel Terrace, Brighton.

By 1872 he was living in the south coast resort town of Brighton, and was elected to the town council in 1872, was made an alderman in 1877 and was mayor of Brighton in 1880–1881.

Smith was a Deputy Lieutenant for Sussex and the City of London, and a J.P. for Brighton.

At the 1885 general election Smith was elected Member of Parliament for Brighton and was reelected the following year. He died suddenly at his Brighton home of heart disease in November 1886 aged 60.

Parliament of the United Kingdom
Preceded by Sir William Thackeray Marriott; John Robert Hollond	Member of Parliament for Brighton; 1885 – 1886; With: Sir William Thackeray Marriott	Succeeded by Sir William Thackeray Marriott; William Tindal Robertson
