= Walter Rice, 7th Baron Dynevor =

British military officer, civil servant and Conservative politician

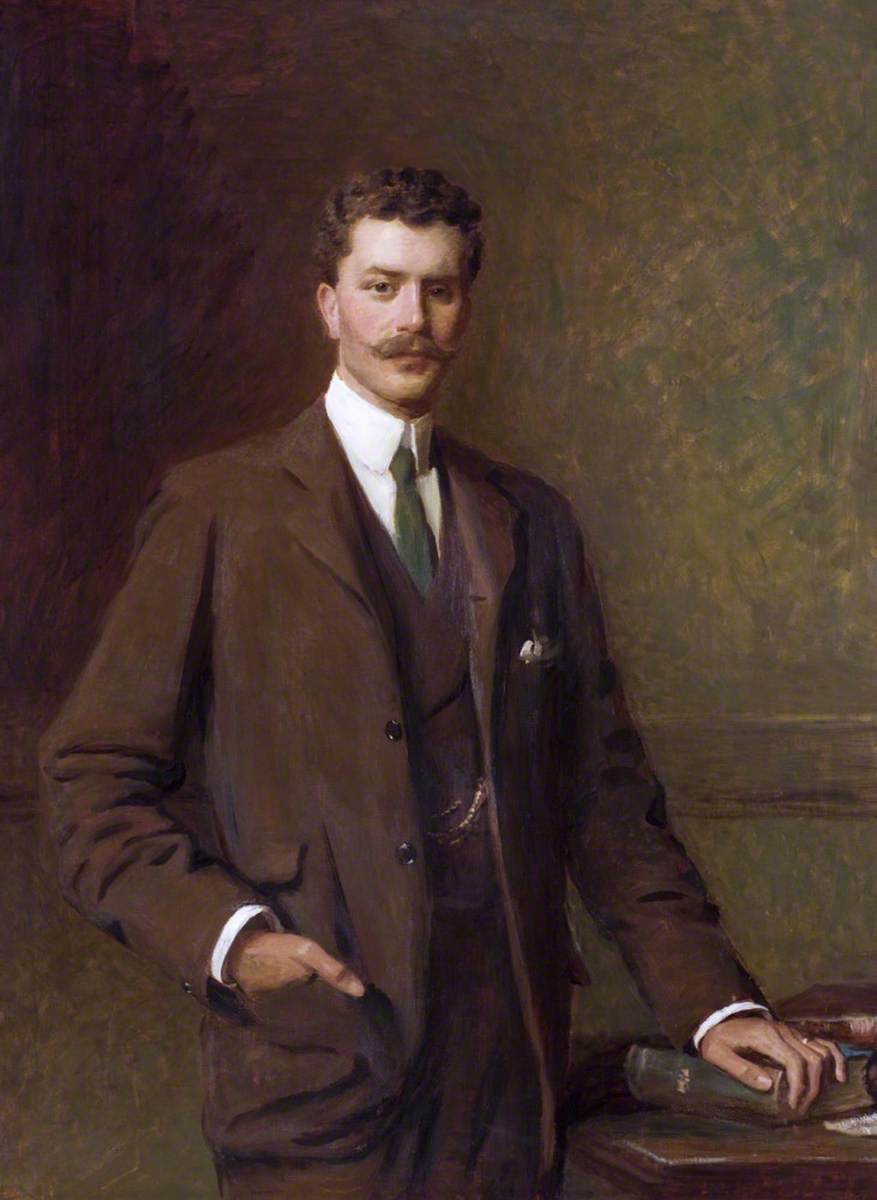
- Portrait of Lord Dynevor, by William Edwards Miller, between c. 1900 and c. 1912

Member of the British Parliament for Brighton
- In office 1910–1911

7th Baron Dynevor
- In office 1911–1956

Personal details
- Born: 17 August 1873 Dursley, Gloucestershire, UK
- Died: 8 June 1956 (aged 82)
- Party: Conservative

Walter FitzUryan Rice, 7th Baron Dynevor (17 August 1873 – 8 June 1956) was a British military officer, civil servant and Conservative politician. He was the only son and heir of the 6th Baron Dynevor.

== Early life and family ==
He was educated at Eton and Christ Church, Oxford. On graduating from Oxford, he served in the part-time Royal Carmarthen Artillery for twelve years, rising to the rank of captain.

On 12 October 1898, he married Lady Margaret Child Villiers (8 October 1875 – 1 April 1959), daughter of Victor Child Villiers, 7th Earl of Jersey, and Margaret (née Leigh), Countess of Jersey.

The 7th Baron had the following children:

- Charles Arthur Uryan Rhys, 8th Baron Dynevor (1899–1962)
- The Honourable Elwyn Villiers Rhys (19 December 1900 – 10 January 1966), married Diana Sloane Stanley
- Hon. Imogen Alice Rhys (27 August 1903 – March 2001), married David Brand, 5th Viscount Hampden.
- Captain Hon. David Reginald Rhys (18 March 1907 – 1991), married Anne Rhys, 7th Duchess of Ciudad Rodrigo. He became Duke of Ciudad Rodrigo and Grandee of Spain.

== Political career ==
From 1899 to 1903, the Hon. Walter Rice served as assistant private secretary to Lord George Hamilton, the Secretary of State for India. From 1903 to 1905, he was assistant secretary to the First Lord of the Admiralty, Lord Selborne. After the Conservative government resigned in 1905, Rice travelled extensively in the Middle East and the Orient.

In January 1910, he was elected MP for Brighton, being re-elected in December. His majority of 4,000 was, he was to comment later, unusually high in a period when average electorates were not large. In 1911, the Hon. Walter Rice became 7th Baron Dynevor on the death of his father. Thereafter, he became increasingly involved with the politics of his native Carmarthenshire. Vice-president of the Carmarthenshire Conservatives in 1912, he was also President of the West Wales Conservatives to 1914, when Conservative re-organisation saw him become President of the South Wales Conservatives, a post he held until 1938.

During the Great War, Lord Dynevor served in the Ministry of Munitions from 1916. Thereafter, he served on the Unionist Devolution Committee, considering the recommendations of the Speaker's Conference on Devolution.

In his locality, he served as a member of Llandeilo Rural District Council representing Llandyfeisant, a very small parish which sat largely within the Dynevor Castle estate. In 1919, he was elected to the Carmarthenshire County Council for Llandeilo, capturing a traditionally Liberal seat as an independent. He retained this seat until increasing deafness forced him to resign in 1935.

Throughout the inter-war years, Lord Dynevor was a key figure in Welsh Conservative politics, as well as the Carmarthenshire territorials. In 1928, Lord Dynevor became Lord Lieutenant of Carmarthenshire. Forced to resign from his offices in 1938 due to increasing deafness, Lord Dynevor was praised for his record of public service.

== Writings ==
In addition to his public duties, Lord Dynevor wrote two books, My Reminiscences, published in 1937, which comprises a short memoir, and a book on the trees in the park at Dynevor.

== Legacy ==
- Walter Street, in Ammanford, Carmarthenshire is named for the 7th Baron. Margaret Street was named for his wife.
- In 1916 displaying Welshness had become sufficiently fashionable for Lord Dynevor to adopt (by royal licence) the older, Welsh form of his surname, "Rhys". In 1906 Rice Street in Betws had been named after him.

== Death ==
Lord Dynevor died on 8 June 1956, aged 82. He was succeeded by his son, the Hon. Charles Arthur FitzUryan Rhys as 8th Baron.

Coat of arms of Walter Rice, 7th Baron Dynevor
Crest A raven Sable. Escutcheon Argent a chevron between three ravens Sable. Supporters Dexter a griffin per fess Or and Argent wings addorsed and inverted tail between the legs, sinister a talbot Argent collared flory counterflory Gules ears Ermine and charged on the shoulder with a trefoil slipped Vert. Motto Secret Et Hardi (Secret And Bold))

== Sources ==
=== Bibliography ===
Records

- Carmarthenshire Record Office, Dynevor Papers Add Mss 4, polling figures for Llandeilo election
- CRO Dynevor Papers, Box 114
- Dynevor Papers, Box 266/9, 'The Home-Coming of the Hon. Walter Rice and His Bride'
- Conservative election address, Brighton, January 1910

Newspapers

- Lord Dynevor's Address to the electors of Llandeilo, February, 1919;
- South Wales Evening Post, 26 February 1938
- Taliaris Papers, box 441
- Lord Dynevor, My Reminiscences (Carmarthen, 1937)

Parliament of the United Kingdom
Preceded by Sir Aurelian Ridsdale; Ernest Villiers	Member of Parliament for Brighton; January 1910 – 1911; With: George Tryon	Succeeded by John Gordon; George Tryon
Honorary titles
Preceded by John Hinds	Lord Lieutenant of Carmarthenshire; 1928 – 1949	Succeeded by George Clark Williams
Peerage of the United Kingdom
Preceded by Arthur Rice	Baron Dynevor; 1911 – 1956	Succeeded by Charles Rhys
