= George Brooke-Pechell =

Royal Navy admiral

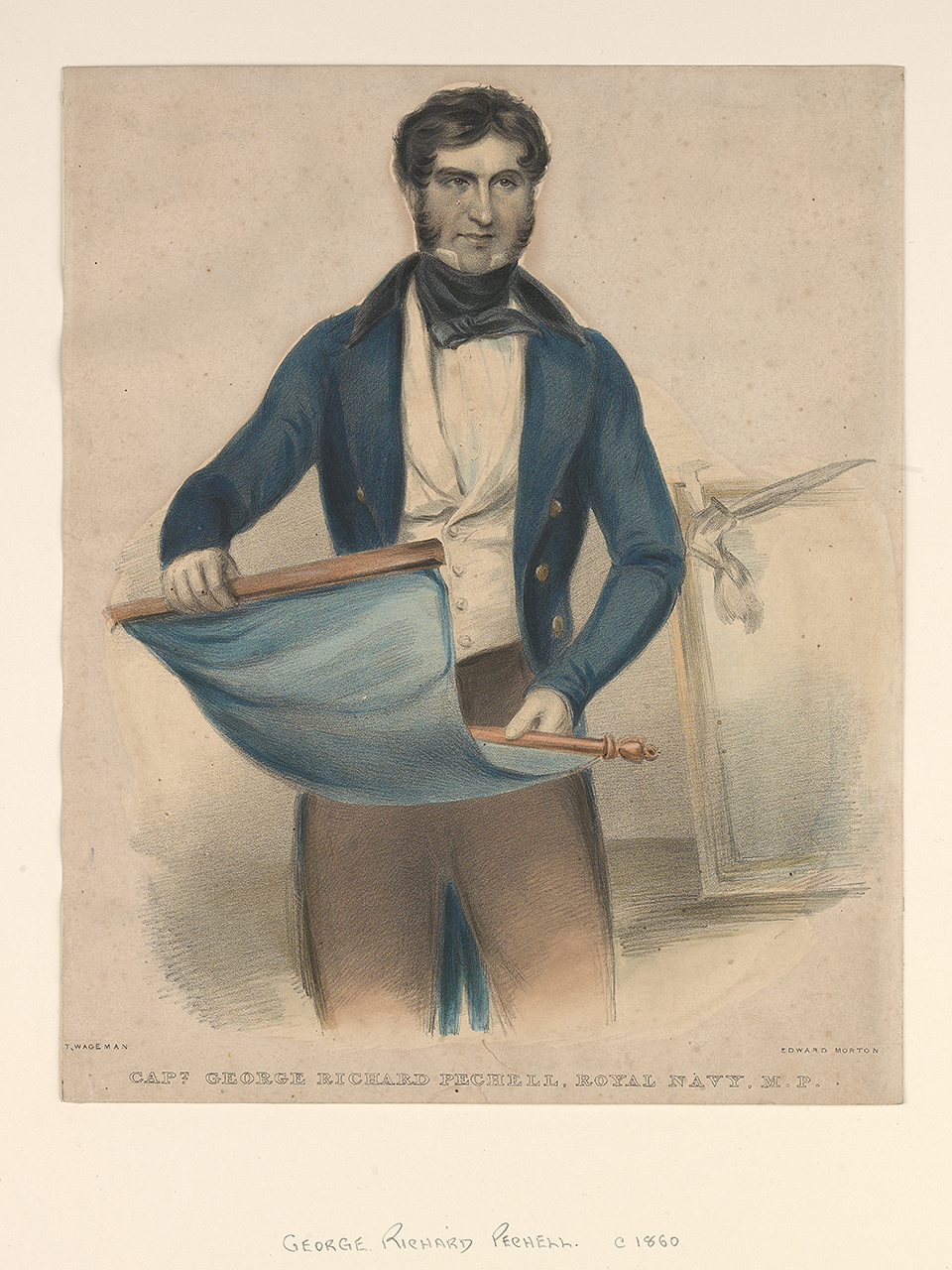
George Richard Pechell

Vice-Admiral Sir George Richard Brooke-Pechell, 4th Baronet (30 June 1789 – 29 June 1860), born George Richard Pechell, was a British Royal Navy officer and Whig politician. He was a Member of Parliament (MP) for Brighton for 25 years.

Sir George was the second son of Major-General Sir Thomas Brooke-Pechell, 2nd Baronet (1753–1826), who was the MP for Downton, and his wife Charlotte (died 1841), second daughter of Lieutenant-General Sir John Clavering. His older brother Rear-Admiral Sir Samuel Pechell inherited the baronetcy, but died childless in 1849, and George succeeded to the title.

Pechell entered the navy in 1803, aged 14, and attained the rank of captain in 1826. He became a rear-admiral on the retired list in December 1852, and vice-admiral on 5 January 1858.

He unsuccessfully contested Brighton at the 1832 general election, but won the seat at the 1835 general election and held it until his death on 29 June 1860, on the day before his 71st birthday. In Parliament he spoke on a range of issues, particularly those on those relating to the navy and to fishing. He supported the secret ballot, non-denominational education for all, and opposed church rates.

He married Katherine Annabella Bishopp, daughter of Sir Cecil Bisshopp, 12th Lord Zouche, on 1 August 1826. They had one son and two daughters.

Brooke-Pechell lived at Castle Goring in Sussex from 1825, when he let the building from Sir Timothy Shelley, father of the poet Percy Bysshe Shelley and Member of Parliament for New Shoreham. In 1845, Brooke-Pechell bought the property from Percy Bysshe Shelley's widow Mary Shelley.

== See also ==
- O'Byrne, William Richard (1849). "Pechell, George Richard" . A Naval Biographical Dictionary . John Murray – via Wikisource.

Parliament of the United Kingdom
Preceded by George Faithfull; Isaac Newton Wigney	Member of Parliament for Brighton; 1835–1860; With: Isaac Newton Wigney; Sir Adolphus Dalrymple, Bt; Isaac Newton Wigney; Lord Alfred Hervey; William Coningham	Succeeded by James White; William Coningham
Baronetage of Great Britain
Preceded by Samuel Pechell	Baronet of Paglesham; 1849–1860	Succeeded by George Samuel Brooke-Pechell
