= William Thackeray Marriott =

British barrister and politician

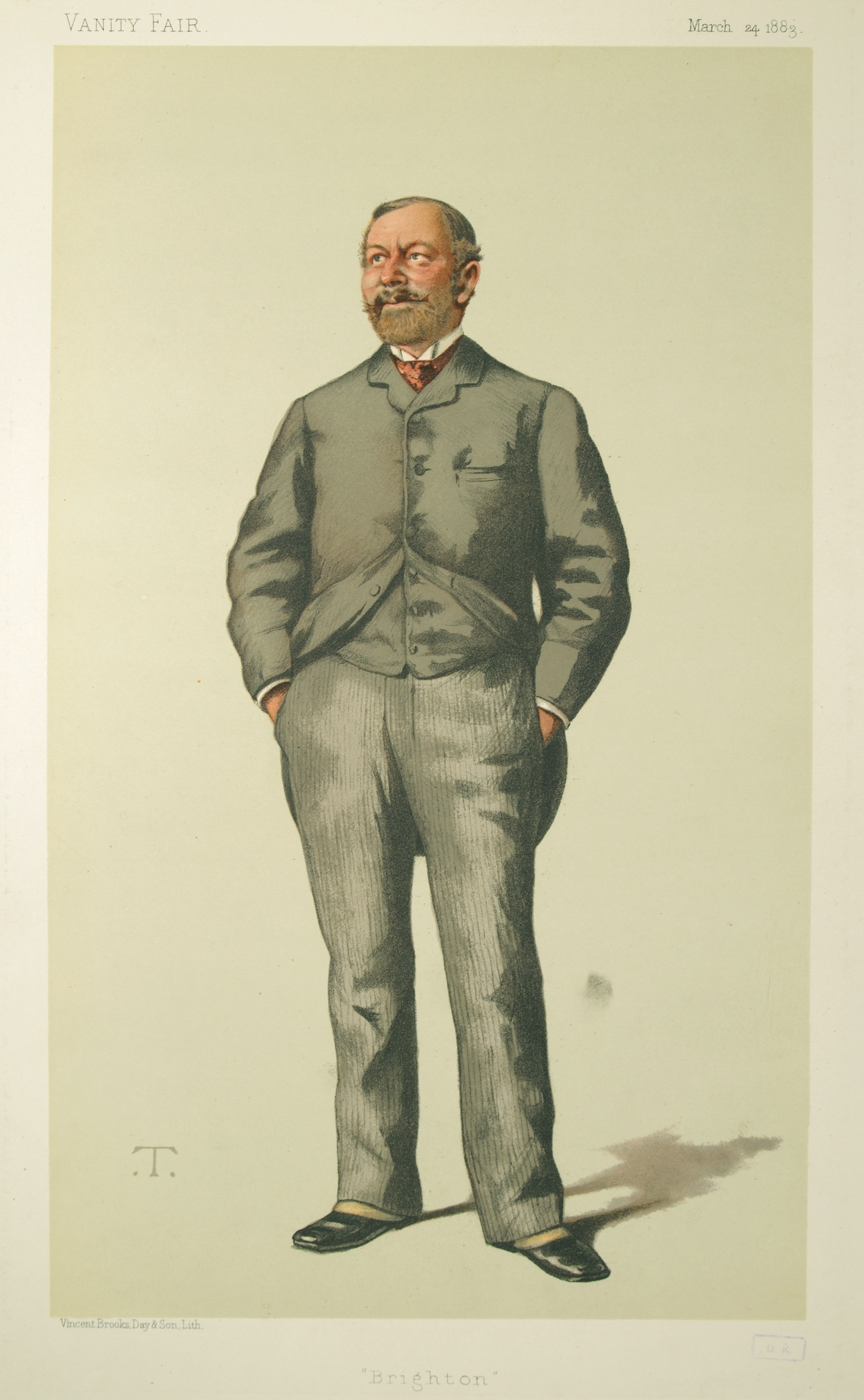
Caricature by Spy published in Vanity Fair in 1883

Sir William Thackeray Marriott PC KC (1834 – 27 July 1903), was a British barrister and Liberal and later Conservative politician who sat in the House of Commons from 1880 to 1893.

== Life ==
Marriott was the third son of Christopher Marriott, of Crumpsall, and his wife Jane Dorothea, daughter of John Poole. He was educated at St John's College, Cambridge. He was ordained deacon in 1858 and became curate of St George's, Hulme, where he was a supporter of the rights of the working classes. However, he declined to take priest's orders for conscientious reasons the following year. Marriott instead entered Lincoln's Inn in 1861 and was called to the Bar in 1864. He established a successful legal practice and was appointed a Queen's Counsel in 1877 and elected a Bencher of Lincoln's Inn in 1879. In 1880 he entered Parliament for Brighton as a Liberal. However, he soon became disillusioned with the Liberal leadership and his 1884 pamphlet "The Liberal Party and Mr Chamberlain" led to a bitter personal controversy with Joseph Chamberlain. He also attacked William Ewart Gladstone's policies in Egypt. In 1884 he resigned his seat in the House of Commons and offered himself for re-election as a Conservative, and was re-elected in March 1884.

When the Conservatives came to power in 1885 under Lord Salisbury, Marriott was sworn of the Privy Council and appointed Judge Advocate General, a post he held until the government fell in 1886. He held the same office in Salisbury's 1886–1892 administration and was knighted in 1888. From 1887 to 1888 he was a counsel for Isma'il Pasha, the deposed former Khedive of Egypt, in his lawsuit against the Egyptian government, and secured him a compensation of £1.2m. In 1892 he became Chancellor of the Primrose League and was one of the main organiser behind a petition against the 1893 Irish Home Rule Bill brought forward by Gladstone. The latter year Marriott resigned his seat in Parliament in order to resume practice at the parliamentary bar. He later emigrated to South Africa.

Marriott married Charlotte Louisa, daughter of Captain Tennant, of Need wood House, Hampshire, in 1872. He died in July 1903.

Parliament of the United Kingdom
Preceded by James Lloyd Ashbury; Charles Cameron Shute	Member of Parliament for Brighton; 1880–1893; With: John Robert Hollond 1880–1885; David Smith 1885–1886; Sir William Tindal Robertson 1886–1889; Gerald Loder 1889–1893	Succeeded by Gerald Loder; Bruce Vernon-Wentworth
Political offices
Preceded by George Osborne Morgan	Judge Advocate General; 1885–1886	Succeeded by John William Mellor
Preceded by John William Mellor	Judge Advocate General; 1886–1892	Succeeded by Sir Francis Jeune
