= Ernest Villiers =

British Clergyman and Liberal MP

- Born: 14 November 1863
- Died: 26 September 1923 (aged 59); Newbury, Berkshire
- Education: Uppingham School
- Alma mater: Peterhouse, Cambridge
- Occupation: MP for Brighton
- Term: 5 April 1905 - January 1910
- Political party: Liberal
- Spouse: Elaine Augusta Guest
- Children: 2 sons, including Amherst Villiers, and 2 daughters
- Parent(s): Reverend Charles Villiers; Florence Mary Tyssen-Amherst

Ernest Amherst Villiers (14 November 1863 – 26 September 1923), was a British clergyman and Liberal politician.

Villiers was the son of Reverend Charles Villiers of Croft, Yorkshire, and his wife Florence Mary (née Tyssen-Amherst). His great-grandfather, the Hon. George Villiers, was the third son of Thomas Villiers, 1st Earl of Clarendon.

Educated at Uppingham School and Peterhouse, Cambridge, he was ordained as an Anglican priest. After three years as a curate in Halifax, he became rector of Haveringland, Norfolk.

Villiers married the Hon. Elaine Augusta, daughter of Ivor Guest, 1st Baron Wimborne, in 1898. The couple had 2 sons and 2 daughters.

He resigned from holy orders to pursue a political career, and was elected to the House of Commons for Brighton at a by-election on 5 April 1905 caused by the appointment of one of the two members as a minister. He won the by-election by 817 votes and held the seat at the 1906 general election, increasing his majority to 853, but then chose not to contest the January 1910 general election.

Villiers died at his residence, Speen Court, Newbury, Berkshire in September 1923, aged 59. He was buried in the graveyard of Speen Parish Church.

Parliament of the United Kingdom
Preceded by Gerald Loder; Bruce Vernon-Wentworth	Member of Parliament for Brighton; 1905 – 1910; With: Bruce Vernon-Wentworth 1905–1906; Aurelian Ridsdale 1906–1910	Succeeded by George Tryon; Walter Rice
