= Aurelian Ridsdale =

British Liberal politician

Sir Aurelian Ridsdale GBE JP FGS
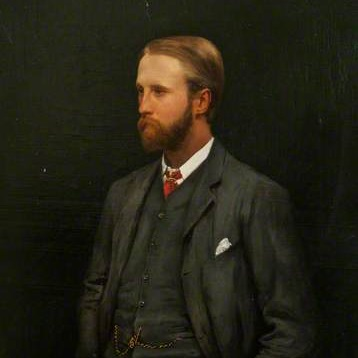

Deputy Chairman, British Red Cross Society
- In office 1914–1919

Chairman, British Red Cross Society
- In office 1912–1914

Member of Parliament for Brighton
- In office 1906–1910

Personal details
- Born: Edward Aurelian Ridsdale; 23 February 1864
- Died: 6 September 1923 (aged 59)

Sir Edward Aurelian Ridsdale (23 February 1864 – 6 September 1923) was a British Liberal politician and leading member of the British Red Cross Society.

== Life ==
He was the eldest son of Edward Lucas Ridsdale of Rottingdean, Sussex and the brother of Lucy Ridsdale, who married Stanley Baldwin.

Ridsdale was educated at University College School and the Royal School of Mines. He served as Member of Parliament for Brighton from 1906 to 1910, when he did not stand for re-election after disagreeing with government policy. He was chairman of the Executive Committee of the British Red Cross Society from 1912 and 1914 and deputy chairman from 1914 to 1919. In recognition of this work during the First World War he was knighted as Knight Grand Cross of the Order of the British Empire (GBE) in the 1920 civilian war honours.

He was a Fellow of the Geographical Society.

== Family ==
Ridsdale married Susan Stirling, daughter of J. R. Findlater of Aberlour, Banffshire. His nephew, Sir Julian Ridsdale, was later the long-serving Conservative MP for Harwich.

== Sources ==
- Obituary, The Times, 8 September 1923

Parliament of the United Kingdom
Preceded by Bruce Canning Vernon-Wentworth; Ernest Villiers	Member of Parliament for Brighton; 1906 – January 1910; With: Ernest Villiers	Succeeded by Walter FitzUryan Rice; George Tryon
