= 1889 Brighton by-election =

UK Parliamentary by-election

The Brighton by-election of 1889 was held on 25 October 1889 after the death of the incumbent Conservative MP William Tindal Robertson. It was retained by the Conservative candidate Gerald Loder.

Brighton by-election, 1889
Party	Candidate	Votes	%	±%
Conservative	Gerald Loder	7,132	60.7	−21.1
Liberal	Rt Hon Sir R Peel	4,625	39.9	+21.1
Majority		2,507	20.2	−1.0
Turnout		11,757	76.8	+19.0
Conservative hold		Swing	-21.1	
