= William Teeling =

Irish-born British writer and Conservative MP (1903–1975)

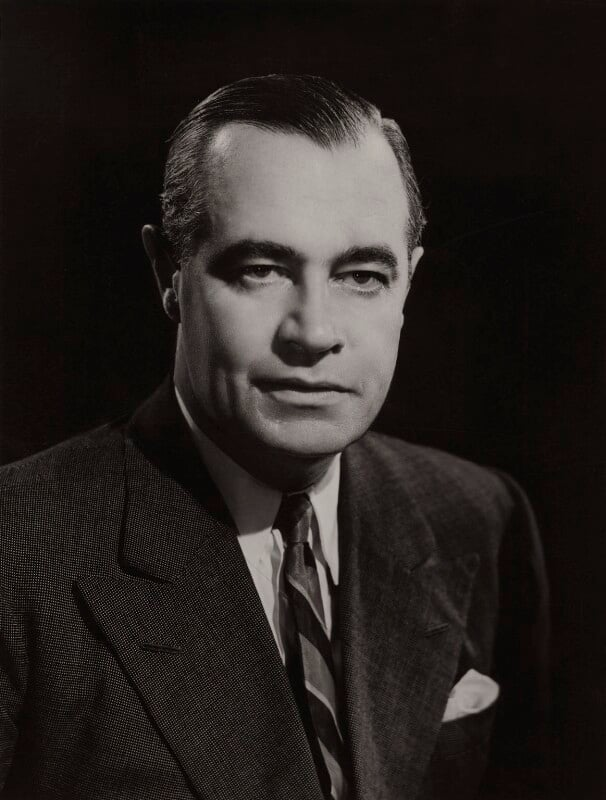
Teeling in 1946

Sir Luke William Burke Teeling (5 February 1903 – 26 October 1975) was an Irish writer, traveller and a Member of Parliament (MP) in the United Kingdom. He was known for his enthusiasm for a Channel Tunnel.

== Background ==
Born on 5 February 1903 in Dublin to a prominent Roman Catholic family, he was the son of Luke Alexander Teeling, Accountant-General of the Irish Supreme Court and his wife Margaret Mary Burke Teeling. His grandfather was the soldier and novelist Charles George Teeling. One of his great-great-uncles, Bartholomew Teeling, was hanged by the British for taking part in the Irish Rebellion of 1798.

He attended the London Oratory School and Magdalen College, Oxford, where he read History.

== Journalistic and literary career ==
Upon graduation, Teeling became a journalist and travelled widely both at home and abroad, especially in the United States where he described himself as an "amateur tramp". He lived among the homeless and hitched lifts on freight trains, reporting back to The Times about his adventures.

In the early 1930s, he studied the youth movements in Nazi Germany. In winter 1933, Teeling had walked all the way from London to Newcastle upon Tyne, sleeping in hostels and examining the efforts of local councils to tackle unemployment.

Another preoccupation when Teeling was travelling abroad was the treatment given to Irish immigrants and to the Catholic Church. In 1937, he wrote The Pope in Politics. The book was expressively dedicated "to those Catholics who have faith in the future of democracy", and suggested that Pope Pius XI was opposed to the new forms of Catholicism developing in the Americas; it also pointed out the Pope's autocratic views and his complicity with Fascist Italy. The following year he published Why Britain Prospers.

He followed this in 1939 with Crisis for Christianity. This book dealt with the relations between the Catholic Church and Nazism.

== Parliamentary career ==
When the Second World War broke out, Teeling joined the Royal Air Force. Having already fought the safe Labour seat of West Ham Silvertown in the 1929 general election, Teeling was elected to Parliament as a Conservative for Brighton in the 1944 Brighton by-election. This was a two-member seat, and Teeling was re-elected in the 1945 general election. The seat was divided into two individual constituencies thereafter, and Teeling was chosen for Brighton Pavilion. He held the seat until his retirement in 1969.

Throughout his Parliamentary career Teeling remained on the backbenches. He maintained a close comradely relationship with Sir Winston Churchill.

A keen Orientalist and collector, his expertise on foreign affairs was well acknowledged amongst his peers, (he was a Freeman of Seoul in Korea). He was also a strong supporter of The Republic of China (Taiwan) and a friend of Madame Chiang Kai-Shek. The President of The Republic if China,Chiang Kai-Shek, presented Dr. Teeling with the Gin-Shin Medal (Order of the Brilliant Star) on 29 November 1959 for his "Achievements and Contributions" to the Republic of China. He maintained a residence near Keelung on the Island of Taiwan and received many gifts from Madame Chang Kai-Shek, including many modest Chinese and Japanese works of art, as she and her friends decorated his home there.

Together with his private secretary, Vera Kaspar, he was a long time supporter of the attempts to build a tunnel under the English Channel, proposing it in 1955 He chaired an all-party committee which campaigned for it. He was also Secretary of the All-Party committee on holiday resorts.

He was knighted in 1962. By 9 July 1968, he was a Member of the Conservative Monday Club and is mentioned as one of the MPs who signed a House of Commons Order Paper (no.151) calling for the government to "exclude all questions of sovereignty over the Falkland Islands from any talks they are having with the Argentine Government".

== Later life ==
Teeling resigned in February 1969, owing to ill health. He maintained a grace and favour residence in St James', London, and travelled to Africa to help his recovery. He became secretary of the Irish Peers Association in June 1970, whose cause he had often promoted. He bequeathed much of his collection of oriental and objets d'art and African tribal artifacts to his private secretary, Vera Kaspar.

In 1967, he became the first president of the UK Taekwon-Do Association, and held the position until his death.

== Books ==
- The Near-by Thing (1933)
- American Stew (1935)
- Gods of Tomorrow (1936)
- The Pope in Politics 1937
- “Why Britain Prospers (1938)
- Crisis for Christianity (1939)
- Gods and Temperance (1939)
- After the War a Symposium of Peace Aims (1940)
- Corridors of Frustration (1970)
- Know Thy Enemy

Parliament of the United Kingdom
Preceded by Sir Cooper Rawson	Member of Parliament for Brighton; 1944–1950; With: Anthony Marlowe	Constituency divided
New constituency	Member of Parliament for Brighton Pavilion; 1950–1969	Succeeded by Julian Amery
