= John Gordon (Conservative politician) =

British politician (1850-1915)

John Edward Gordon

Member of Parliament for Elginshire & Nairnshire
- In office 1895–1906
- Preceded by: John Seymour Keay
- Succeeded by: Sir Archibald Williamson

Member of Parliament for Brighton
- In office 1911–1914 Serving with George Tryon
- Preceded by: Walter Rice; George Tryon
- Succeeded by: George Tryon; Charles Thomas-Stanford

Personal details
- Born: 5 February 1850 Scotland
- Died: 19 February 1915 (aged 65) Bromley, Kent, England
- Party: Conservative
- Spouse: Elizabeth Anna Henry (m. 1879; sep. 1907)
- Children: 5
- Parent: Edward Gordon (father)
- Relatives: John Snowdon Henry (father-in-law)
- Education: Edinburgh Academy; University of Edinburgh

John Edward Gordon (5 February 1850 – 19 February 1915) was a British Conservative Party politician.

The eldest son of Edward Gordon, Baron Gordon of Drumearn, a senior Scottish judge and Conservative politician, he was educated at Edinburgh Academy and the University of Edinburgh. In 1879, he married Elizabeth Anna Gordon (1851–1925), the daughter of John Snowdon Henry, a former member of parliament for South East Lancashire. The couple had five children.

He was elected at the 1895 general election as the Member of Parliament (MP) for Elginshire and Nairnshire, defeating the Liberal MP John Keay. He was re-elected in 1900, but did not defend the seat again.

At the 1906 general election, he stood in the two-seat Brighton constituency having moved to Hove on the south coast of England which then formed part of the same seat. He came fourth, albeit in a close contest, and did not stand again until the Brighton by-election in June 1911. He was returned unopposed to fill the vacancy caused when the sitting MP Walter Rice was elevated to the peerage on inheriting the title of Baron Dynevor. However, he resigned the seat three years later due to ill health, on 23 June 1914, by accepting the post of Steward of the Manor of Northstead.

He died in a nursing home in Bromley, Kent, in February 1915 aged 65. In 1907, his wife moved to Japan and is buried on Mount Koya.

Parliament of the United Kingdom
Preceded by John Seymour Keay	Member of Parliament for Elginshire & Nairnshire; 1895 – 1906	Succeeded by Sir Archibald Williamson
Preceded by Walter Rice; George Tryon	Member of Parliament for Brighton; 1911 – 1914; With: George Tryon	Succeeded by George Tryon; Charles Thomas-Stanford
