= Bruce Vernon-Wentworth =

British politician

Vernon-Wentworth in 1895.

Bruce Canning Vernon-Wentworth (14 December 1862 – 12 November 1951) was a British army officer, Conservative Party politician and first-class cricketer.

The eldest son of Thomas Frederick Charles Vernon Wentworth of Wentworth Castle near Barnsley, Yorkshire and Dall House, Rannoch, Perthshire and his wife Lady Harriet Augusta Canning de Burgh, daughter of the Marquess of Clanricarde and grand daughter of former prime minister George Canning.

Educated at Harrow and the Royal Military College, Sandhurst, he received a commission into the Grenadier Guards, rising to the rank of captain. A keen cricketer, he played first-class cricket for the Marylebone Cricket Club on three occasions between 1897 and 1900, scoring 133 runs at an average of 26.60 and with a high score of 36.

A member of the Conservative Party, he unsuccessfully contested the parliamentary constituency of Barnsley on three occasions. He entered the Commons at an unopposed by-election in 1893, when he was elected to represent Brighton. He held the seat until the 1906 general election. He served as High Sheriff of Yorkshire for the year 1908-09.

Vernon-Wentworth was a director of the London and Yorkshire Bank and of the Yorkshire local board of the National Provincial Bank Limited. He sold Wentworth Castle to Barnsley Corporation in 1948, and died unmarried in 1951, aged 88.

Parliament of the United Kingdom
| Preceded by William Thackeray Marriott; Gerald Loder | Member of Parliament for Brighton; 1893–1906; With: Gerald Loder 1893–1905; Ernest Villiers 1905–1906 | Succeeded by Aurelian Ridsdale; Ernest Villiers |
