= 1940 Brighton by-election =

UK Parliamentary by-election

The 1940 Brighton by-election was held on 9 May 1940. The by-election was held due to the elevation to the peerage of the incumbent Conservative MP, George Tryon. It was won by the Conservative candidate Lord Erskine, who was unopposed.
