= Edmund Giles Loder =

English aristocrat, landowner and plantsman

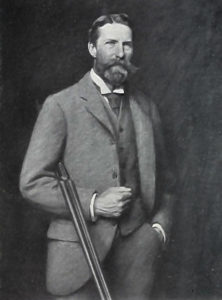
- Born: 7 August 1849; London, England
- Died: 14 April 1920 (aged 70)
- Education: Eton College; Trinity College, Cambridge
- Occupations: Landowner; Plantsman
- Spouse: Marion Hubbard
- Parent(s): Sir Robert Loder, 1st Baronet; Maria Georgiana Busk
- Relatives: Hans Busk (maternal grandfather) Julia Clara Busk (maternal aunt) William Pitt Byrne (maternal uncle) Hans Busk (maternal uncle)

Sir Edmund Giles Loder, 2nd Baronet (7 August 1849 – 14 April 1920) was an English Aristocrat, Horticulturist, Naturalist and Sportsman

== Biography ==
=== Early life ===
Edmund Giles Loder was born on 7 August 1849 in London, England. His father was Sir Robert Loder, 1st Baronet, a landowner and Conservative politician, and his mother, Maria Georgiana Busk. His maternal grandfather was Hans Busk, a Welsh poet.

He was educated at Eton College, a private boarding school in Eton, Berkshire, and graduated from Trinity College, a constituent college of the University of Cambridge. When at Eton he competed in the 100 yards event at the AAC Championships, winning the silver medal at the 1869 AAC Championships.

=== Career ===
He served as a Justice of the Peace for Sussex and Northampshire.

Loder was also a partner of Prescott, Cave, Buxton, Loder & Co. which was a prominent 19th-century private bank based in the City of London. Established at 62 Threadneedle Street, it operated until 1891 when it merged with three other regional banks to form a larger joint-stock company, later evolving into a part of the NatWest Group.

==== Horticulture ====
Loder was active as a plant collector, breeder and grower. He developed hybrid rhododendrons from crosses between R. fortunei and R. griffithianum. The plants were named the Loderi hybrids and group in his honour. Three, Loderi King George, Loderi Pink Diamond and Loder's White, have received the Award of Garden Merit from the Royal Horticultural Society. He developed the garden at his home at Leonardslee extensively.

==== Zoology ====
Loder was a well-known member at the Zoological Society, of which Peter Chalmers Mitchell mentions that he was known to have valued knowledge of all different breeds of native species in Africa. These were accumulated through Loder's hunting expeditions, but also purchase.

Later in the nineteenth century, Edmund Giles Loder rediscovered the rhim gazelle, an achievement commemorated in the synonym Gazella loderi and the common name "Loder's gazelle," although the species had first been described by Frédéric Cuvier in 1842.

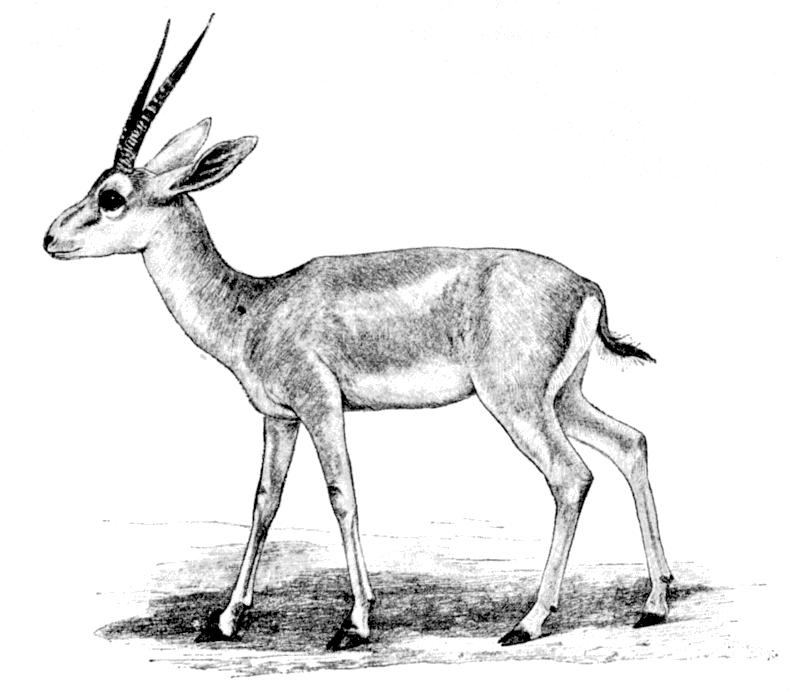
Loder's Gazelle

In Africa Loder enjoyed shooting Elephants, Rhinoceros, and rarely Lion which he shout once with a .256 Mannlicher These were accumulated through Loder's hunting expeditions, but also purchase.

==== Sportsman ====
Loder was known for his great memory. In 1878, Loder remembered shooting a Pronghorn Antelope in 1873, in Colorado, and also the tree to which he left it hanging. Five years later, he went straight back to the tree and collected the antelope's skeleton. These were accumulated through Loder's hunting expeditions, but also purchase.

Living at Whittlebury Lodge, Loder was very fond of the red deer in his 660-acre park; these deer carried antlers with up to 16 points. There were also Fallow deer and Japanese deer. Loder also sent Mule deer to his father from America, which quickly died out and also Wapiti. These were accumulated through Loder's hunting expeditions, but also purchase. Along with his game in the park, Edmund's father Sir Robert Loder, 1st Baronet introduced Real Tennis and a Bowling alley to the House; this court was the location of King Edward VII's last ever game of Tennis. These were accumulated through Loder's hunting expeditions, but also purchase.

=== Personal life ===
Loder was a member of the Loder family

He married Marion Hubbard, daughter of William Egerton Hubbard. They had two children:

- Patience Marion Loder (1882–1963). She married Walter William Otter (unknown-1940).
- Robert Egerton Loder (1887–1917). He married Muriel Rolls Hoare (1879–1955). They had one son:
  - Sir Giles Rolls Loder, 3rd Baronet (1914–1999).

They resided at Beach House in Worthing, West Sussex. During his visits to Brighton, King Edward VII (1841–1910) would spend time in the garden at Beach House with his friend Arthur Sassoon (1840–1912). They also resided at Leonardslee in Lower Beeding near Horsham in West Sussex.

He died on 14 April 1920.

=== Natural history collection ===
Loder kept a menagerie in the grounds of Leonardslee, the family ancestral home in Sussex. Many of the animals were made into osteology specimens, and 200 skulls and skeletons are now are in the collection of World Museum, National Museums Liverpool, being presented to the museum in 1961. A number of the game heads from Loder's museum are in Rowland Ward's Records of Big Game. These were accumulated through Loder's hunting expeditions, but also purchase.

== Bibliography ==
- Conifers at Leonardslee (1919).
- Edmund Loder: A memoir, with a portrait (with Sir Alfred Pease, 2nd Baronet, 1923).

Baronetage of the United Kingdom
Preceded by Robert Loder	Baronet (of Whittlebury and High Breeches); 1888–1920	Succeeded by Giles Rolls Loder
