= Wakehurst (disambiguation) =

Wakehurst is a property owned by the National Trust and managed by Royal Botanic Gardens, Kew, near Ardingly, West Sussex, southern England. It may also refer to:

- Electoral district of Wakehurst for the Legislative Assembly in the Australian state of New South Wales
- Wakehurst Christian School, the former name of Oxford Falls Grammar School in Sydney, NSW, Australia
- Wakehurst F.C., a football club in Northern Ireland
- Wakehurst Public School in Belrose, a suburb of Sydney, Australia
- Baron Wakehurst, of Ardingly in the County of Sussex, is a title in the Peerage of the United Kingdom
  - Gerald Loder, 1st Baron Wakehurst, LLB JP DL (1861–1936), British barrister, businessman and Conservative politician
  - John Loder, 2nd Baron Wakehurst KG, KCMG, GCStJ (1895–1970), British Army officer, politician and colonial administrator

== See also ==
- Akehurst
- Akhurst
