= Hans Busk =

Hans Busk may refer to:

- Hans Busk (1718–1792), older brother of Sir Wadsworth Busk
- Hans Busk (1772–1862), son of Sir Wadsworth Busk
- Hans Busk (1815–1882), son of the Hans Busk born in 1772
