= Ewart (disambiguation) =

Ewart is both a given name and a surname. It may also refer to:

- Ewart baronets, two baronetcies in the United Kingdom
  - Ewart baronets of Glenmachan House and Glenbank (1887)
- Ewart Building, a United States historic place in Pittsburgh, Pennsylvania
- Ewart College, a former women's college in Toronto, Ontario, Canada
- Ewart, Manitoba, a locality in Manitoba, Canada
- Ewart Park Phase, a period of the later Bronze Age Britain
