= Akehurst =

Akehurst is an old English name derived from "ake," meaning oak, and "hurst," meaning "a grove of trees." The name likely comes from the modern town of Oakhurst, once called "Acersc." The name is primarily found in the Sussex area of England.

Notable people with the surname include:

- Bailey Akehurst (born 2003), English footballer
- Elizabeth Akehurst (born 1975), South African cricketer
- John Akehurst (British Army officer) (1930–2007), British Army officer
- John Akehurst (fashion photographer), American fashion photographer
- Len and Dorothy Akehurst, founders of Doomadgee Mission in Queensland, Australia
- Luke Akehurst (born 1972), British politician
- Michael Barton Akehurst (1940–1989), British lawyer and author

== See also ==
- Akhurst
- Wakehurst
