= Loder baronets =

Baronetcy in the Baronetage of the United Kingdom

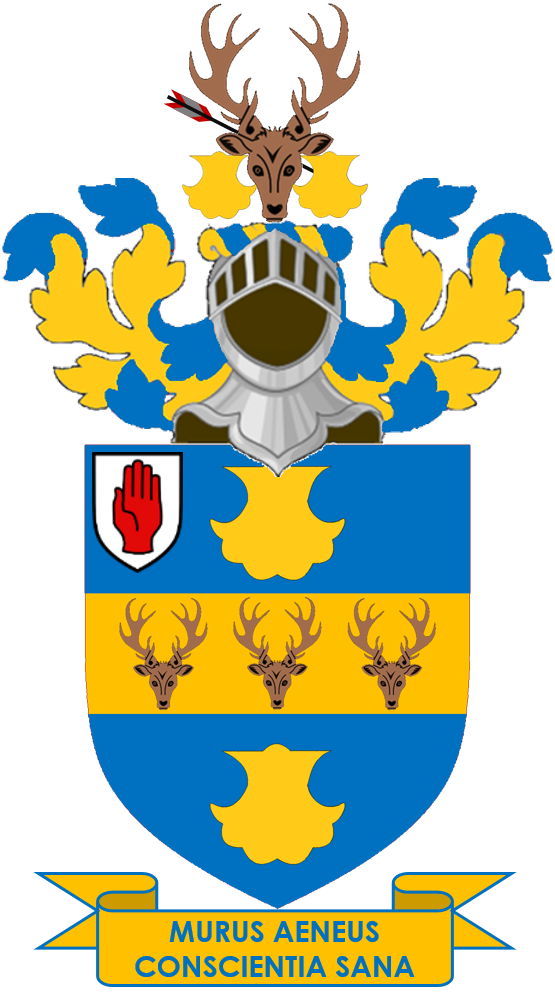
- Escutcheon of the Loder baronets of Whittlebury and High Beeches
- Creation date: 1887
- Status: extant
- Motto: Murus Æneus Conscientia Sana, a sound conscience is a wall of brass
- Arms: Azure on a Fess between two Escallops Or three Buck's Heads cabossed proper
- Crest: Between two Escallops Or a Buck's Head cabossed transfixed with an Arrow bendwise point to the sinister all proper

The Loder baronetcy, of Whittlebury in the County of Northampton, and of High Beeches in Slaugham in the County of Sussex, was created in the Baronetage of the United Kingdom on 27 July 1887 for Robert Loder, who had previously represented New Shoreham in the House of Commons as a Conservative.

== Loder baronets, of Whittlebury and High Beeches (1887) ==
- Sir Robert Loder, 1st Baronet (1823–1888)
- Sir Edmund Giles Loder, 2nd Baronet (1849–1920)
- Sir Giles Rolls Loder, 3rd Baronet (1914–1999)
- Sir Edmund Jeune Loder, 4th Baronet (born 1941)

The heir presumptive is the present holder's brother Robert Reginald Loder (born 1943).

== Extended family ==
Gerald Loder, 1st Baron Wakehurst was the fifth son of the 1st Baronet.

=== Male-line family tree ===
Male-line family tree, Loder Baronets and Baron Wakehurst

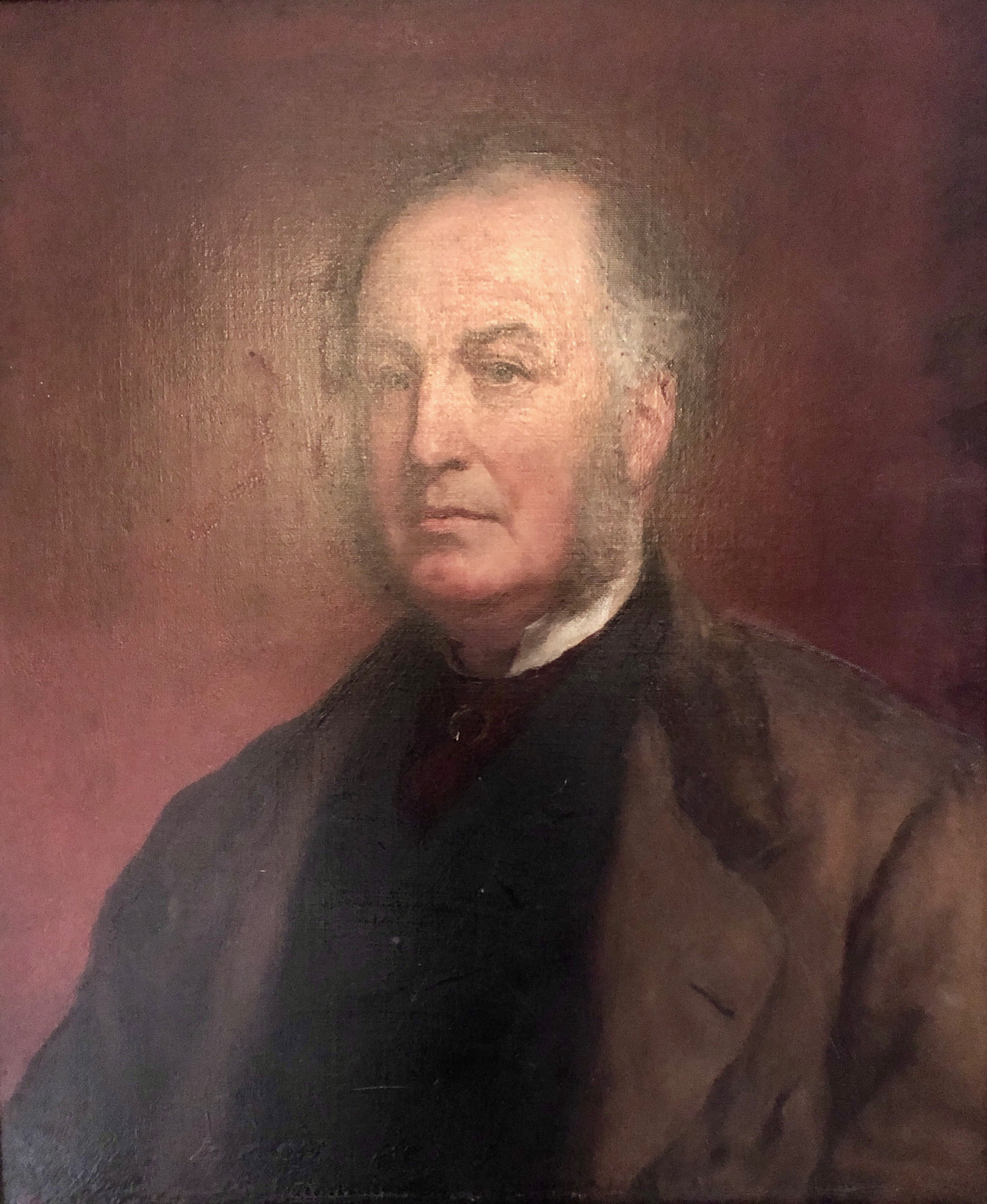
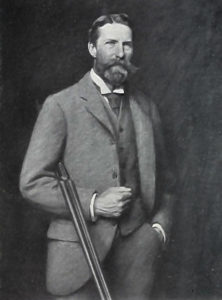
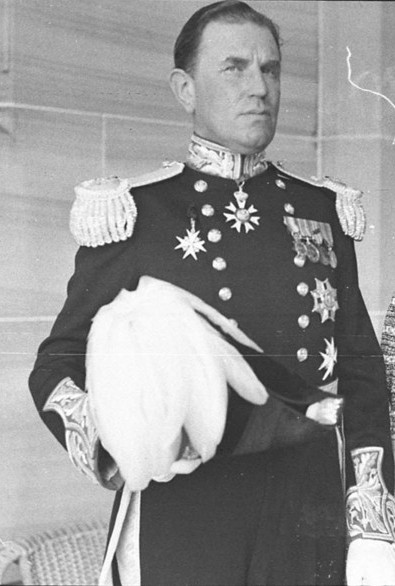
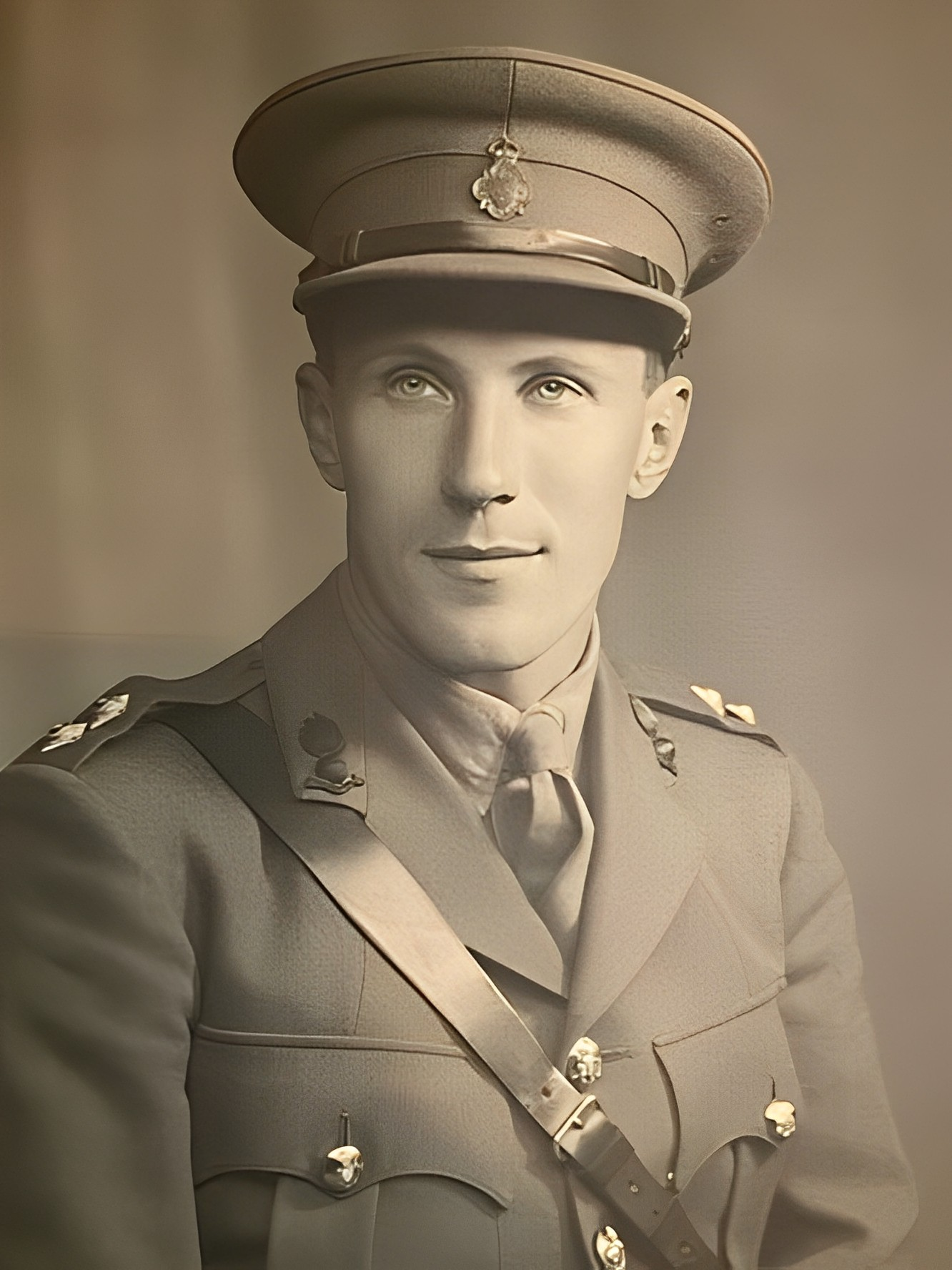
Robert Loder; 1st Baronet of Whittlebury and High Beeches 1823–1888
Edmund Giles Loder; 2nd Baronet of Whittlebury and High Beeches 1849–1920	Gerald Loder; 1st Baron Wakehurst 1861-1936
Capt. Robert Egerton Loder 1887–1917	John de Vere Loder, 2nd Baron Wakehurst 1895-1970
Giles Rolls Loder; 3rd Baronet of Whittlebury and High Beeches 1914–1999.	John Christopher Loder, 3rd Baron Wakehurst; 1925-2022	Robert Beauclerk Loder; 1934-2017
Edmund Jeune Loder; 4th Baronet Whittlebury and High Beeches born 1941	Robert Reginald Loder born 1943	Timothy Walter Loder, 4th Baron Wakehurst; 1958–2024	John James Loder, 5th Baron Wakehurst born 1977	Nicholas David Robert Loder born 1987
Christopher Giles Loder born 1968	Peter Thomas Loder born 1972
Alexander Robert Loder

Baronetage of the United Kingdom
Preceded by Thursby baronets	Loder baronets of Whittlebury and High Beeches; 27 July 1887	Succeeded by Gilstrap baronets
