= Rachel Harriette Busk =

British traveller and folklorist

Rachel Harriette Busk (1831—1907) was a British traveller and folklorist.

== Life ==
She was born in 1831, in London. She was the youngest of five daughters of Hans Busk the elder and his wife Maria; and sister of Hans Busk the younger and of Julia Clara Byrne. She was the sister-in-law of Sir Robert Loder, 1st Baronet through her sister Maria Georgiana.

She collected tales from Italy, Spain, Mongolia and elsewhere. Her collection included folklore, supernatural events, legends of saints, and humorous anecdotal material. Her work on Italian folklore was strongly influenced by the work of Giuseppe Pitrè.

She converted to Catholicism in 1858 and lived in Rome after 1862.

She died at Members' Mansions, Westminster, on 1 March 1907, and was buried in the family vault at Frant, near Tunbridge Wells.

== Works ==
- Patranas or Spanish Stories (1870)
- Household Stories from the Land of Hofer, or Popular Myths of Tirol (1871)
- Sagas from the Far East: Kalmouk and Mongol Tales (1873).
- The Folk-lore of Rome (1874)
- The Valleys of Tirol (1874)
- The Folk-Songs of Italy (1887)

== Bibliography ==
- Hopkin, David (2018). “‘Imagine I am the Creatura’: Biography of Rachel Busk, a British Folklorist in Europe”, in BEROSE - International Encyclopaedia of the Histories of Anthropology, Paris.

== Sources ==
- Cooper, Thompson (1884). "Busk, Rachel H." . Men of the Time (eleventh ed.). London: George Routledge & Sons. p. 198.
