= John Akehurst =

John Akehurst is the name of:

- John Akehurst (British Army officer) (1930–2007), Deputy Supreme Allied Commander Europe
- John Akehurst (photographer), beauty and fashion photographer
