= Peter Pan's Playground =

Amusement park in West Sussex, England

Peter Pans Playground
- Interactive map of Peter Pans Playground
- Location: Worthing, West Sussex, England
- Coordinates: 50.8113°N 0.3620°W
- Status: Defunct
- Opened: 1951
- Closed: 2010
- Owner: Worthing Borough Council
- Operating season: 10.15am - 5.30pm. Easter holidays and weekends until mid May. Then daily to mid September.

Peter Pan's Playground was an amusement park in the coastal resort of Worthing, West Sussex, England for young children under 11 years of age (children had to be accompanied by an adult)

== History ==
Set in the former grounds of the Beach House, Worthing, in 1951 Peter Pan's Playground was created with a miniature train, play barn, crazy cars, flying chairs, trampolines and a castle and a cafe. It was surrounded by a paddling pool, boating pool and tennis courts and the beach and promenade.

The admission fee included unlimited access to all the attractions within the park (excluding the crazy golf), all day long, including re-entry. They originally used hand stamps (and later on waterproof wristbands) upon leaving the park which could be used to re-enter on the same day without further charges allowing use of the neighbouring facilities such as the paddling pool.

In 2003 it was acquired by Clive Hagger who restored and updated the attraction with a ball pond, punch bags, a bouncy castle and a large inflatable slide.

During Christmas 1951 the site was flooded.

== Closure ==
In 2009 the future began to look uncertain for the playground as plans were drawn up to put a new £17 million pound swimming pool complex on the site to replace the neighbouring Aqaurena pool This was deeply unpopular as no alternative location was being offered for the attraction and the replacement pool Splashpoint was going to be smaller and cause the loss of the neighbouring paddling pool and boating lake. Eventually the playground closed for the last time in September 2010.
