= Aquarena =

Aquarena, or Aquaréna, may refer to:

- Aquaréna (Mogyoród), a water park near Budapest, Hungary
- Aquarena (St. John's), a multi-functional sports facility in St. John's, Canada
- Aquarena (Worthing), a former swimming pool in Worthing, UK
- Kyoto Aquarena, an indoor swimming pool and skating rink in Kyoto, Japan
- A former name for the Meadows Center for Water and the Environment, an educational center in San Marcos, Texas, US
