= John Loder, 2nd Baron Wakehurst =

British politician (1895–1970)

The Right Honourable The Lord Wakehurst KG KCMG GCStJ
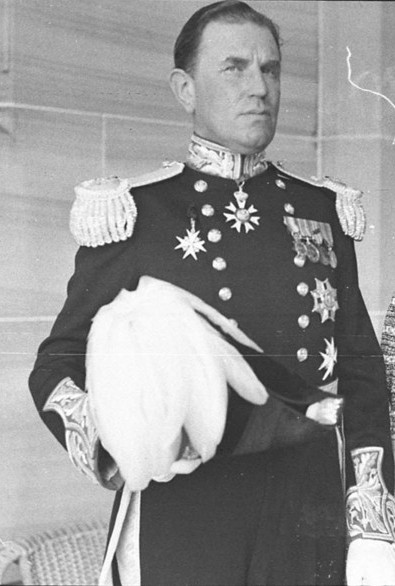
- Wakehurst in 1937

29th Governor of New South Wales
- In office 8 April 1937 – 8 January 1946
- Monarch: George VI
- Premier: Bertram Stevens; Alexander Mair; William McKell
- Lieutenant: Sir Philip Street; Sir Frederick Jordan
- Preceded by: Sir David Anderson
- Succeeded by: Sir John Northcott

3rd Governor of Northern Ireland
- In office 3 December 1952 – 1 December 1964
- Monarch: Elizabeth II
- Preceded by: The Earl Granville
- Succeeded by: The Lord Erskine of Rerrick
Parliamentary offices
Member of the House of Lords
Lord Temporal
as a hereditary peer 30 April 1936 – 30 October 1970
Preceded by	The 1st Baron Wakehurst
Succeeded by	The 3rd Baron Wakehurst
Member of Parliament; for Lewes
In office 27 October 1931 – 30 April 1936
Preceded by	Tufton Beamish
Succeeded by	Tufton Beamish
Member of Parliament; for Leicester East
In office 29 October 1924 – 30 May 1929
Preceded by	George Banton
Succeeded by	Frank Wise

Personal details
- Born: 5 February 1895 Chelsea, London, England
- Died: 30 October 1970 (aged 75) Chelsea, London, England
- Party: Conservative
- Spouse(s): Margaret, Baroness Wakehurst (née Tennant)
- Children: 4; including John Loder, 3rd Baron Wakehurst
- Education: Eton College

Military service
- Allegiance: United Kingdom
- Branch/service: British Army
- Years of service: 1914–1919
- Rank: Captain
- Unit: Royal Sussex Regiment; Intelligence Corps
- Battles/wars: First World War: Gallipoli campaign; Sinai and Palestine campaign
- Awards: Mentioned in Despatches

John de Vere Loder, 2nd Baron Wakehurst, (5 February 1895 – 30 October 1970) was a British Army officer, politician and colonial administrator. After serving in the army, the Foreign Office, and as a Conservative Member of Parliament (MP) in the House of Commons, Wakehurst was appointed as the last British Governor of New South Wales, which he held from 1937 to 1946. Upon returning to Britain he was appointed Governor of Northern Ireland from 1952 to 1964. He was made a Knight Companion of the Order of the Garter in 1962 and died in 1970.

== Early years ==
Loder was born in London in February 1895, the only son of Conservative MP Gerald Loder, the fourth son of Sir Robert Loder, 1st Baronet and member of a prominent Sussex family, and Lady Louise de Vere Beauclerk, the daughter of the 10th Duke of St Albans and personal friend of Queen Victoria, who permitted Loder to be christened in the Chapel Royal of St. James's Palace.

Through his mother's family, he was descended from an illegitimate royal line of King Charles II. Loder was educated at Eton College, where he excelled in history and languages, with a particular interest in drama. Although originally intending to go to Trinity College, Cambridge, with the outbreak of the First World War, Loder was instead commissioned into the 4th Battalion of the Royal Sussex Regiment, and later joined the Intelligence Corps, seeing service throughout the war in Gallipoli, Egypt and Palestine. For his services, he was Mentioned in Despatches, and left the British Army in 1919 with the rank of captain.

Loder worked as a clerk in the Foreign Office from 1919 to 1922 and then for two years at the League of Nations in Geneva. On 3 June 1920, he married Margaret "Peggy" Tennant, the daughter of prominent Liberal politician and businessman, Sir Charles Tennant, 1st Baronet. Together they had four children: three sons, Christopher, David and Robert, and a daughter, Henrietta. Indulging in his interest in Egyptology, Loder wrote his first book: The Truth about Mesopotamia, Syria and Palestine. (1923).

John and Peggy Loder travelled on a world tour in 1924, including a visit to Australia. Although initially unimpressed, describing Sydney as "afflicted with so much Victorian architecture of the worst kind", by the end he had warmed to the country, writing that Australia was "a splendid country with splendid people" possessing a "democratic spirit". Returning to England, Loder was narrowly elected as the Conservative Member of Parliament for Leicester East in 1924, a seat he held until being defeated in the 1929 General Election. Loder then made several visits to Bolshevik Russia, writing another book entitled: Bolshevism in Perspective (1931). In 1931 he returned to the House of Commons as member for Lewes, and represented this constituency until succeeding his father on his death as the second Baron Wakehurst in 1936, who had been raised to peerage in 1934. Loder then entered the House of Lords.

== Governor of New South Wales ==
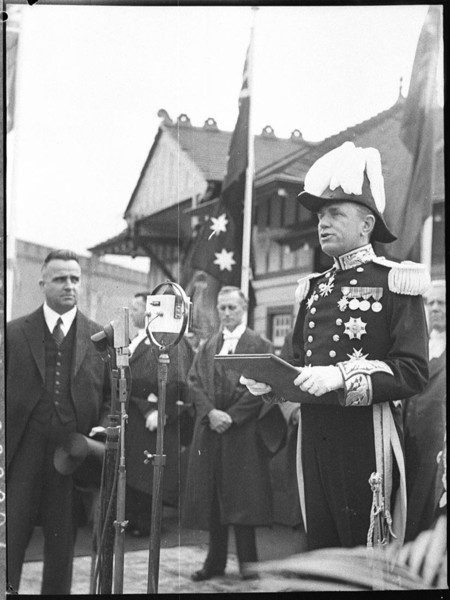
Lord Wakehurst is received in NSW by Premier Bertram Stevens (left) in 1937

The following year, Wakehurst was appointed as Governor of New South Wales to succeed Sir David Anderson, who had died in office. He was recommended by the Dominions Secretary, Malcolm MacDonald, to the Premier of New South Wales, Bertram Stevens, who promptly accepted. King George VI then formally approved and Wakehurst's appointment was officially announced on 7 January 1937.

Before he left, Wakehurst was appointed as a Knight Commander of the Order of St Michael and St George (KCMG) and later a Knight of Justice of the Order of St John of Jerusalem (KStJ) in June 1937. He was to be the last non-Australian governor of the State. The Wakehursts, accompanied by their three sons (Henrietta, at school at the time, would join them three months later), arrived in Sydney, New South Wales on 8 April 1937 and the six-foot, red-haired Wakehurst was sworn in at Government House on the same day.

Wakehurst, aware of any potential criticism over his British Conservative background, arranged for their children to be schooled in Australia: Christopher Loder who attended Tudor House School, then left to attend a year at Eton College before returning to attend The King's School, Parramatta; David Loder to Tudor House before attending Geelong Grammar School; Robert Loder attended Cranbrook School, and Henrietta Loder returned to obtain a Diploma in Social Studies at the University of Sydney.

Early on in their term, the Wakehursts engaged themselves in the typical Vice-regal duties, becoming involved in various sporting and community organisations, touring the state and fulfilling the social responsibilities required of the Vice-Regal Couple. They officiated at the celebrations for the coronation of King George VI in 1937 and at the Sesquicentenary of Australian settlement celebrations in January 1938.

In August 1939, he handled a major political crisis brought about when the former Deputy Leader of the governing United Australia Party, Eric Spooner brought down Premier Stevens in a motion of no confidence. Wakehurst successfully asked the Treasurer, Alexander Mair, to form a government. While Wakehurst was well within his rights to exercise his discretion, the Leader of the Opposition, Jack Lang, criticised him for being biased towards the government. However, on 5 September Lang was deposed by his party and replaced by the more moderate William McKell, who became Premier at the May 1941 election and got on well with Wakehurst, extending his term past 1942.

In January 1940 the Wakehursts helped fight bushfires near Moss Vale and heavily involved themselves towards the war effort following Australia's entry into the Second World War, giving regular speeches and rallying people to contribute towards the war effort.

In 1945, the Wakehursts accompanied General Sir Thomas Blamey and his wife on a visit to troops in the South-West Pacific Area. Wakehurst's extended appointment ended on 8 January 1946, then the longest term for a New South Wales Governor, and returned to England, marking the end of 158 years of British Governors in New South Wales.

His portrait, commissioned by the Sydney City Council and painted by Sir William Dobell in 1944, was presented to Wakehurst by the Lord Mayor of Sydney Alderman Reg Bartley and is held in Government House, Sydney.

== Later life and legacy ==
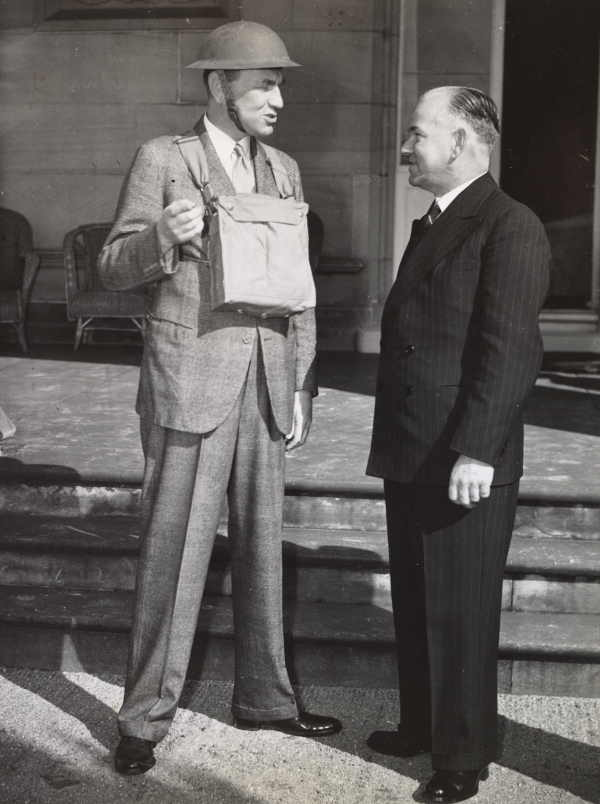
Wakehurst with Bob Heffron, Minister for National Emergency Services, in 1941.

Upon returning to Britain, Lord and Lady Wakehurst worked with community organisations including the Order of St John of Jerusalem, of which Wakehurst was Lord Prior from 1948 to 1969, subsequently also a Bailiff Grand Cross of the Order (GCStJ), and for the English-Speaking Union. An avid theatre-lover Wakehurst was a trustee of the Royal Opera House, Covent Garden and a governor of the Royal Ballet. Lady Wakehurst also served on the executive committee of the Royal National Orthopaedic Hospital. Lord Wakehurst succeeded Earl Granville as the Governor of Northern Ireland on 3 December 1952.

Wakehurst was a keen amateur filmmaker and dozens of reels of his films survive in the National Film Archive including his colour recordings of the Coronation in 1953.

In May 1962, Queen Elizabeth II appointed Wakehurst as a Knight Companion of the Order of the Garter (KG). Reappointed for a second term in 1958, Wakehurst retired from office in 1964 and died on 30 October 1970 at his home at Chelsea, London.

To commemorate their service as Viceroys of NSW, the trustees of the Royal National Park named a major road through the park as "Lady Wakehurst Drive", which was dedicated by Lord Wakehurst and then Minister for Works, Joseph Cahill, at a ceremony on 14 May 1945.

On 22 March 1946, to commemorate his service as Governor a major new road through Sydney's Northern Beaches was named as the "Wakehurst Parkway" by Premier McKell. This led to many other local locations being named for Wakehurst including the local soccer club in 1968, the Golf Club and the New South Wales Legislative Assembly Electoral district of Wakehurst.

In January 1952 the new section of the Crown Street Women's Hospital was named the "Lady Wakehurst Annexe" in their honour, which lasted until the hospital was closed in 1983. In July 1966, Belrose South Public School in Belrose on the Northern Beaches was renamed in his honour as Wakehurst Public School. In 1974, the Public Transport Commission named a ferry Lady Wakehurst.

== Family ==
Lord Wakehurst married Margaret "Peggy" Tennant (4 November 1899 – 19 August 1994), the daughter of prominent Liberal politician and businessman, Sir Charles Tennant, 1st Baronet and Marguerite Agaranthe Miles, on 3 June 1920. Her great grandfather was the Scottish chemist and industrialist, Charles Tennant and her half-sister was Margot Asquith, Countess of Oxford and Asquith, the English socialite and wife of Prime Minister H. H. Asquith. They had four children:

- Hon. Henrietta Marguerite Jean Loder (Mrs John Reader-Harris) (5 February 1922 – 16 December 1995)
- John Christopher Loder, 3rd Baron Wakehurst (23 September 1925 - 29 July 2022)
- Hon. James David Gerald Loder (24 March 1928 – 19 July 2001)
- Hon. Robert Beauclerk Loder (24 April 1934 – 22 July 2017)

Lady Wakehurst was appointed a Dame Commander of the Order of the British Empire (DBE) in 1965. She was also a Dame of the Order of St John of Jerusalem (DStJ) from 1960 and received an honorary Doctor of Laws from Queen's University, Belfast (1957). Survived by their daughter and three sons, she died on 19 August 1994, aged 94. Their youngest son Robert became a patron of the arts, particularly in Africa.

== Arms ==
Coat of arms of John de Vere Loder, 2nd Baron Wakehurst, KG, KCMG, GCStJ
Coronet A Baron's Coronet Crest Between two escallops Or a stag's head cabossed transfixed through the jaw by an arrow in bend proper. Escutcheon Azure on a fess between in chief a portcullis and in base a martlet Or three stags' heads cabossed proper.

== Honours ==
Viceregal styles of The Lord Wakehurst
- Reference style: His Excellency
- Spoken style: Your Excellency

Flag of the governor of Northern Ireland

Knight Companion of the Order of the Garter (KG)	1962
Knight Commander of the Order of St Michael and St George (KCMG)	1937
Bailiff Grand Cross of the Venerable Order of St John of Jerusalem (GCStJ)	1947
Knight of Justice of the Venerable Order of St John of Jerusalem (KStJ)	1937
1914–15 Star	
British War Medal	
Victory Medal with Mention in Despatches oak leaf	
King George V Silver Jubilee Medal	1935
King George VI Coronation Medal	1937
Queen Elizabeth II Coronation Medal	1953
Service Medal of the Order of St John	1963: 15 years of service with the Order of St. John

=== Honorary military appointments ===
- (New South Wales) 11 May 1939 – 22 October 1956: Honorary Colonel of the Sydney University Regiment.
- 29 July 1937 – 15 August 1946: Honorary Air Commodore of No. 22 Squadron, Royal Australian Air Force.

Parliament of the United Kingdom
Preceded by George Banton	Member of Parliament for Leicester East; 1924–1929	Succeeded by Frank Wise
Preceded by Tufton Beamish	Member of Parliament for Lewes; 1931–1936	Succeeded by Tufton Beamish
Government offices
Preceded by Sir David Anderson	Governor of New South Wales; 1937–1946	Succeeded by Sir John Northcott
Preceded by The Earl Granville	Governor of Northern Ireland; 1952–1964	Succeeded by Lord Erskine of Rerrick
Other offices
Preceded by The Earl of Clarendon	Lord Prior of the Order of St John; 1947–1969	Succeeded by The Lord Caccia
Peerage of the United Kingdom
Preceded by Gerald Loder	Baron Wakehurst; 1936–1970	Succeeded by John Loder
