= Bayside, Worthing =

Residential tower in Worthing, England

Bayside

General information
- Status: Completed
- Type: Residential
- Location: Worthing, BN11; United Kingdom, Brighton Road
- Coordinates: 50.812°N 0.3608°W
- Construction started: November 2017
- Topped-out: 1 October 2019
- Completed: 2022
- Opening: 2021
- Cost: £45 million
- Owner: Roffey Homes

Height
- Height: 52 metres (172 ft)

Technical details
- Floor count: Bayside Vista: 15; Bayside Horizon: 6
- Lifts/elevators: Bayside Vista: 10

Design and construction
- Architecture firm: Allies and Morrison

Website
- Baysideworthing.co.uk

Bayside is a residential development located on the eastern approach to Worthing town centre in West Sussex, England. Designed by Allies and Morrison, it consists of two main buildings, the tallest of which, Bayside Vista, is a 15-storey tower that reaches 52 metres (172 ft) and is the tallest building in Worthing. It replaced the Aquarena swimming pool.

The 0.7-hectare (1.7-acre) site is about 500 metres (0.3 miles) to the east of Worthing Pier, on the edge of East Worthing. It is bounded by Brighton Road to the north, Splashpoint Leisure Centre to the west, Merton Road to the east and the town's seafront and beach to the south. Views extend southwards across the English Channel and the Bay of Sussex and northwards towards the South Downs.

Construction began in November 2017 and the building was topped out on 1 October 2019. It was completed in 2022.

== History ==
=== 2015 original scheme ===
Roffey Homes originally proposed a 21-storey £40 million tower on the site. Planning permission was rejected by Worthing Borough Council in September 2015.

=== 2017 revised scheme ===
Roffey appointed new architects, Allies and Morrison, in November 2015. The 141-home scheme with a new seafront square, cafe and 620 m^{2} (6,700 sq ft) of commercial space was approved by Worthing Borough Council in January 2017. Bayside Vista is a 15-storey tower while Bayside Horizon is much lower and fronts Brighton Road. Once approved, Peter Bottomley, MP for Worthing West called for a Government inquiry into the plans but the Secretary of State for Housing, Communities and Local Government, Sajid Javid declined the request to intervene.

== Architecture ==
Designed to act as a counterpoint to the horizontal massing of the adjacent Splashpoint Leisure Centre, Bayside acts as a marker of the start of the town centre esplanade and beach, with a lantern-like structure. According to Ben Cheal of Roffey Homes, the design from Allies and Morrison incorporates features from historic buildings in Worthing. Writing in the Architects' Journal, Ella Braidwood called the overall design of Bayside 'playful' and described the Bayside Vista tower as 'curvaceous'.

The tower won the 2023 Building Beauty Awards held by the Royal Fine Arts Commission Trust. The 'impressive' building was praised for its references to local Regency architecture while creating 'an original and powerful landmark'. It was described as 'a worthy replacement for the depressing 1960s swimming pool that previously occupied the site' and 'bookends the seafront terraces of Regency Worthing, harmonising with their white stucco while steering clear of weak historicism'. This award meant the tower represented the UK for the International Building Beauty Prize at the 2023 World Architecture Festival in Singapore.

== Bayside Social ==
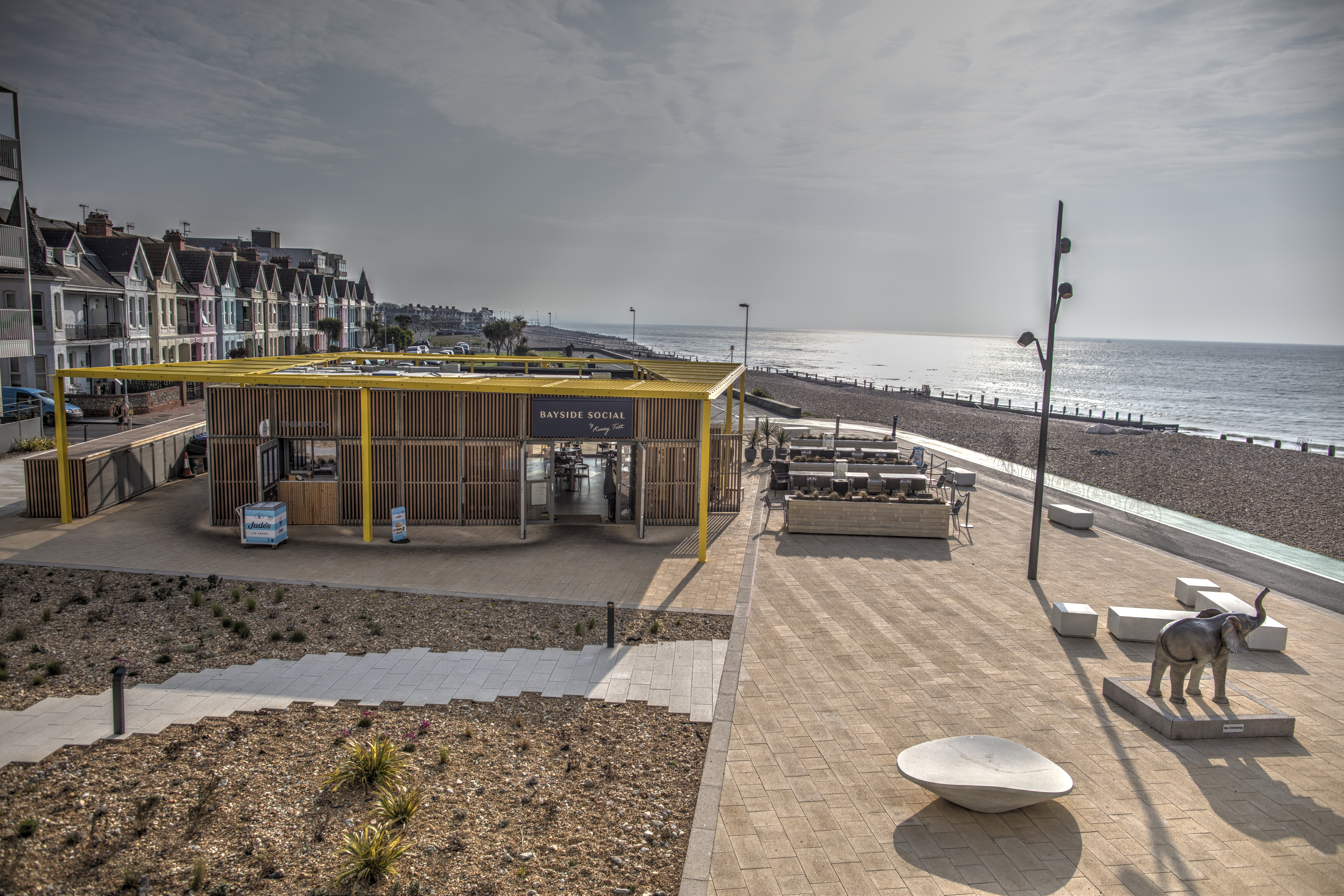
The restaurant in April 2022.

Masterchef winner Kenny Tutt opened his second Worthing restaurant, called Bayside Social at Bayside in 2021. The restaurant was closed on 15 April 2023, with the owners blaming 'rising costs' and the 'long-lasting effects of COVID-19 on hospitality businesses'.

== Ranking among Worthing high-rise buildings ==
Bayside Vista is the tallest tower in Worthing. When it was topped out on 1 October 2019 it overtook Manor Lea in West Worthing which had previously been Worthing's tallest building at 43 metres (141 ft) tall since it was built in 1967.

== Previous uses of the site ==
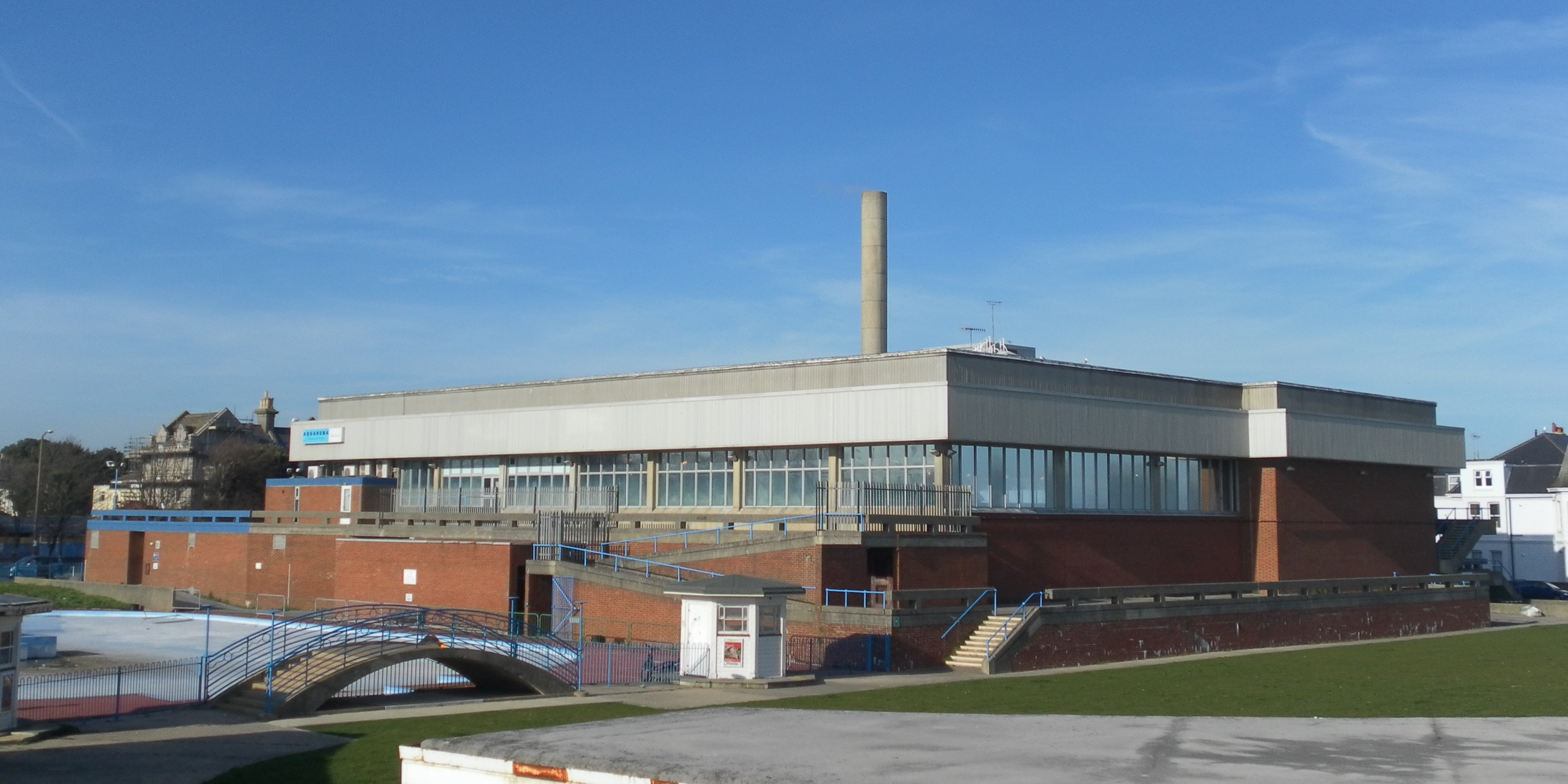
The former Aquarena swimming pool in 2011

- The Aquarena Swimming Pool opened in 1968 as Worthing's main indoor swimming pool, replacing the West Worthing Baths in Heene Road. Designed by John Attenborough the pool was closed in 2013 and demolished in 2018.
- Grounds of Beach House - in the 19th and early 20th centuries the site was part of the extensive grounds of Beach House. The site, along with the rest of Beach House and its grounds was sold at auction to Percy Brazier for £16,000. Brazier then sold the site to Worthing Council for the same price of £16,000.

== See also ==
- Beach House, Worthing
- Splashpoint Leisure Centre
- Teville Gate
- List of tallest buildings by United Kingdom settlement
