= Giles Rolls Loder =

English aristocrat and WWII veteran (1914–1999)

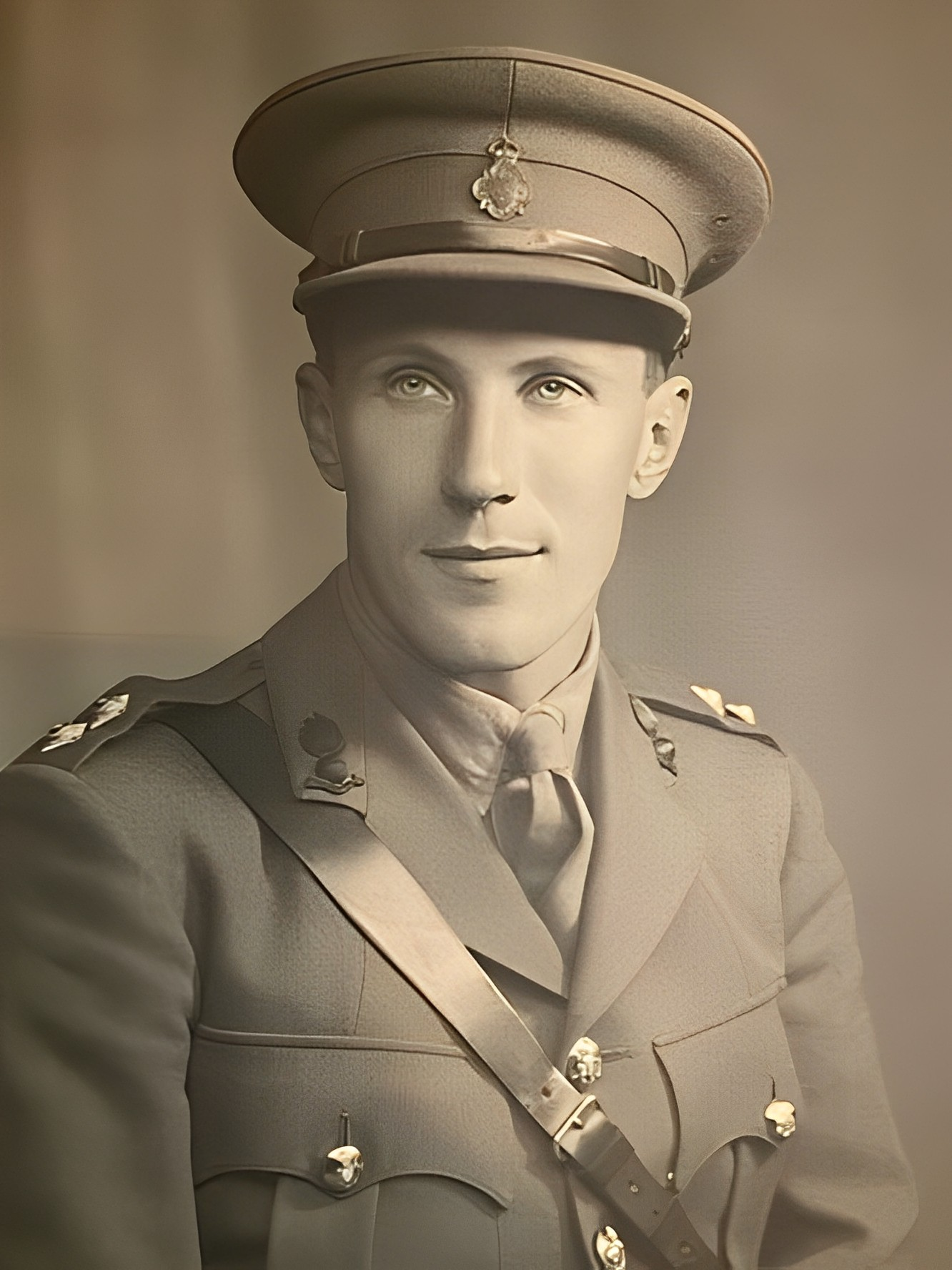
- Born: 10 November 1914; London, England
- Died: 24 February 1999 (aged 84); Haywards Heath, East Sussex, England
- Occupations: Horticulturalist; Yachtsman
- Spouse: Marie Violet Pamela Symons-Jeune
- Parents: Robert Egerton Loder; Muriel Rolls Hoare

Sir Giles Rolls Loder, 3rd Baronet DL, J.P, FLS (1914–1999) was an English aristocrat, World War II veteran, public official, horticulturalist and yachtsman.

== Biography ==
=== Early life ===
Giles Rolls Loder was born on 10 November 1914 in London, England. His father was Robert Egerton Loder and his mother, Muriel Rolls Hoare. His paternal grandfather was Sir Edmund Giles Loder, 2nd Baronet and his paternal great-grandfather was Sir Robert Loder, 1st Baronet.

He graduated from Eton College in 1936, and from Trinity College, Cambridge in 1944.

=== Public service ===
During World War II, he served in the Surrey and Sussex Yeomanry, and later worked with the Vosper & Company for the British Navy. He later served as High Sheriff of Sussex in 1948 and justice of the peace in 1949. He also served as Deputy Lieutenant of West Sussex in 1977.

=== Horticulture ===
He served as vice-president of The Royal Horticultural Society. He was a recipient of the Victoria Medal of Honour for his horticultural prowess in 1968. At his family estate of Leonardslee, he planted hundreds of varieties of rhododendrons, magnolias, and camellias, and built two greenhouses. He was elected President of Sussex Wildlife Trust on 21 October 1978 and remained in office until October 1983.

=== Yachting ===
An avid yachtsman, he was a member of the Royal Yacht Squadron. He took part in the Cowes Week, one of the longest-running regular regattas in the world, where he sometimes skippered on the Kaylena, a well-known 12-metre (39 ft) yacht.

=== Personal life ===
Loder is a Member of the Loder (Family)

On 11 July 1939, he married Marie Violet Pamela Symons-Jeune, at St Margeret Church in Westminster, daughter of Captain Bertram Symons-Jeune, a famous garden designer. They had two sons:

- Sir Edmund Jeune Loder, 4th Baronet (born 1941). He married (and later divorced) Penelope Jane Forde. They had a daughter:
  - Gillian Marie Loder (born 1968). She married James D. P. Morgan. They had two children:
    - Mathew Morgan (born 1995).
    - Olivia Morgan (born 1996).
- Robert Reginald Loder (born 1943). He married Quenelda Jane Royden, daughter of Sir John Ledward Royden, 4th Baronet (1907–1976). They had four children:
  - Christopher Giles Loder (born 1968).
  - Catherine Marie Violet Loder (born 1970).
  - Peter Thomas Loder (born 1972).
  - Mary Charlotte Loder (born 1972).

They resided at Ockenden Manor, a Grade II*-listed house in Cuckfield, West Sussex.

He died on 24 February 1999.

Baronetage of the United Kingdom
Preceded by Edmund Giles Loder	Baronet (of Whittlebury and High Beeches); 1920–1999	Succeeded by Edmund Jeune Loder
