= Christopher Loder, 3rd Baron Wakehurst =

British hereditary peer (1925–2022)

The Right Honourable The Lord Wakehurst

Member of the House of Lords
- Lord Temporal
- as a hereditary peer 1970–1999
- Preceded by: The 2nd Baron Wakehurst
- Succeeded by: Seat abolished

Personal details
- Born: 23 September 1925
- Died: 29 July 2022 (aged 96)
- Party: Non-affiliated
- Parent: The 2nd Baron Wakehurst (father)

John Christopher Loder, 3rd Baron Wakehurst (23 September 1925 – 29 July 2022) was a British hereditary peer. He served the title of Baron Wakehurst, after succeeding his father John Loder, 2nd Baron Wakehurst upon his death in 1970, and was a member of the House of Lords from 1970 to 1999.

Lord Wakehurst died on 29 July 2022, at the age of 96.
