= Julia Clara Byrne =

British author

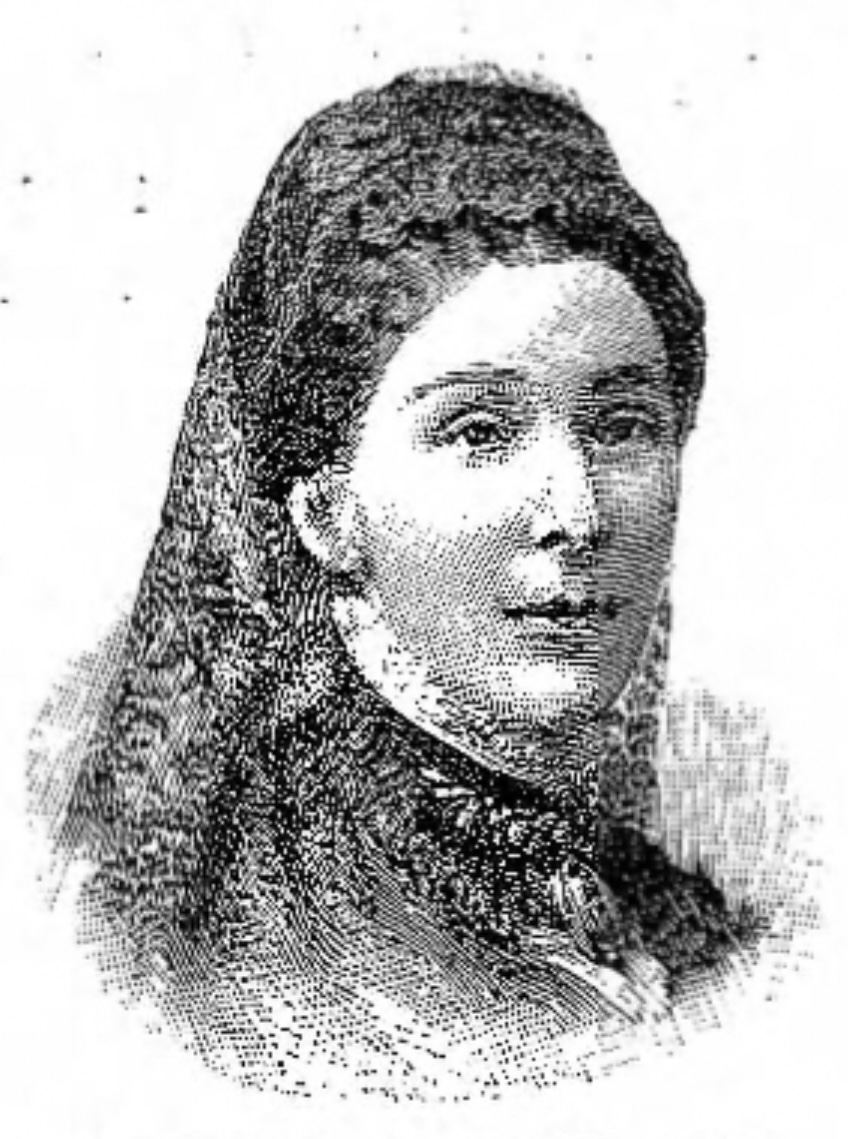
- Obituary in The Graphic, from a photograph by Barraud
- Born: Julia Clara Busk; May 1819; Marylebone, London, England
- Died: 1894
- Burial place: Kensal Green
- Spouse: William Pitt Byrne (m. 1842; died 1861)
- Father: Hans Busk
- Family: Hans Busk the younger (brother); Rachel Harriette Busk (sister)

Julia Clara Pitt Byrne (née Busk, May 1819, christened 6 Jul 1819 – 1894) was a British writer of memoirs about celebrities of her time, as well as more serious social commentary.

== Biography ==
Born in Marylebone, she was the second daughter of Hans Busk, and the sister of Hans Busk the younger and Rachel Harriette Busk. She was also the sister-in-law of Sir Robert Loder, 1st Baronet through her sister Maria Georgiana. She married William Pitt Byrne in 1842, who was owner of The Morning Post and son of Charlotte Dacre. The couple lived in Montague Street. She converted to Catholicism in 1860.

She is best known for the work Flemish Interiors, and her subsequent works were often published under the name of "The Author of Flemish Interiors" rather than her own name, or sometimes as Mrs. William Pitt Byrne. Other books include Gossip of the Century and Social Hours With Celebrities. In a more serious vein, Undercurrents Overlooked described abuses in workhouses.

She was buried in Kensal Green.
