= Akhurst =

Akhurst is a surname. Notable people with the surname include:

- Carl Akhurst (1886–1953), Australian politician
- Daphne Akhurst (1903–1933), Australian tennis player
- Lucy Akhurst (born 1970), British actress
- William Akhurst (1822–1878), Australian actor

== See also ==
- Akehurst
- Wakehurst
