= Gilstrap baronets =

Extinct baronetcy in the Baronetage of the United Kingdom

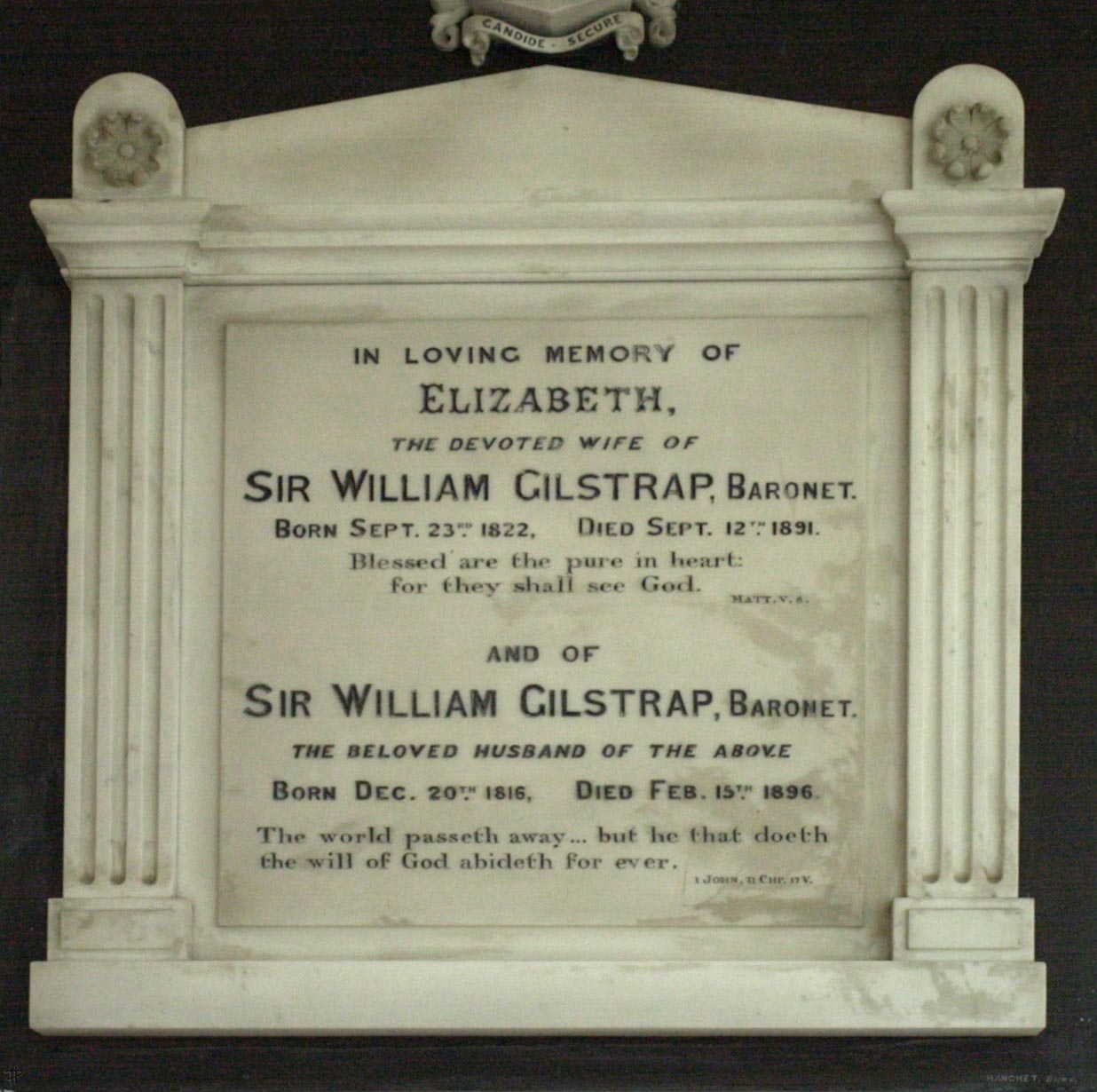
Sir William Gilstrap memorial plaque in Fornham St Martin church

The Gilstrap Baronetcy, of Fornham St Genevieve in the County of Suffolk and of the High Beeches in the Parish of Slaugham in the County of Sussex, was a title in the Baronetage of the United Kingdom.

It was created in Queen Victoria's 1887 Golden Jubilee Honours on 28 July 1887 for the prominent maltster and philanthropist William Gilstrap, who endowed the Gilstrap library in Newark. The title became extinct on his death in 1896. He is buried in the churchyard of St. Martin's parish church in Fornham St. Martin, Suffolk, England.

== Gilstrap baronets, of Fornham St Genevieve and of the High Beeches (1887) ==
- Sir William Gilstrap, 1st Baronet (1816–1896)

Baronetage of the United Kingdom
Preceded by Loder baronets	Gilstrap baronets of Fornham St Genevieve and of the High Beeches; 28 July 1887	Succeeded by Ewart baronets
