= Splashpoint Leisure Centre =

Leisure centre in Worthing, England

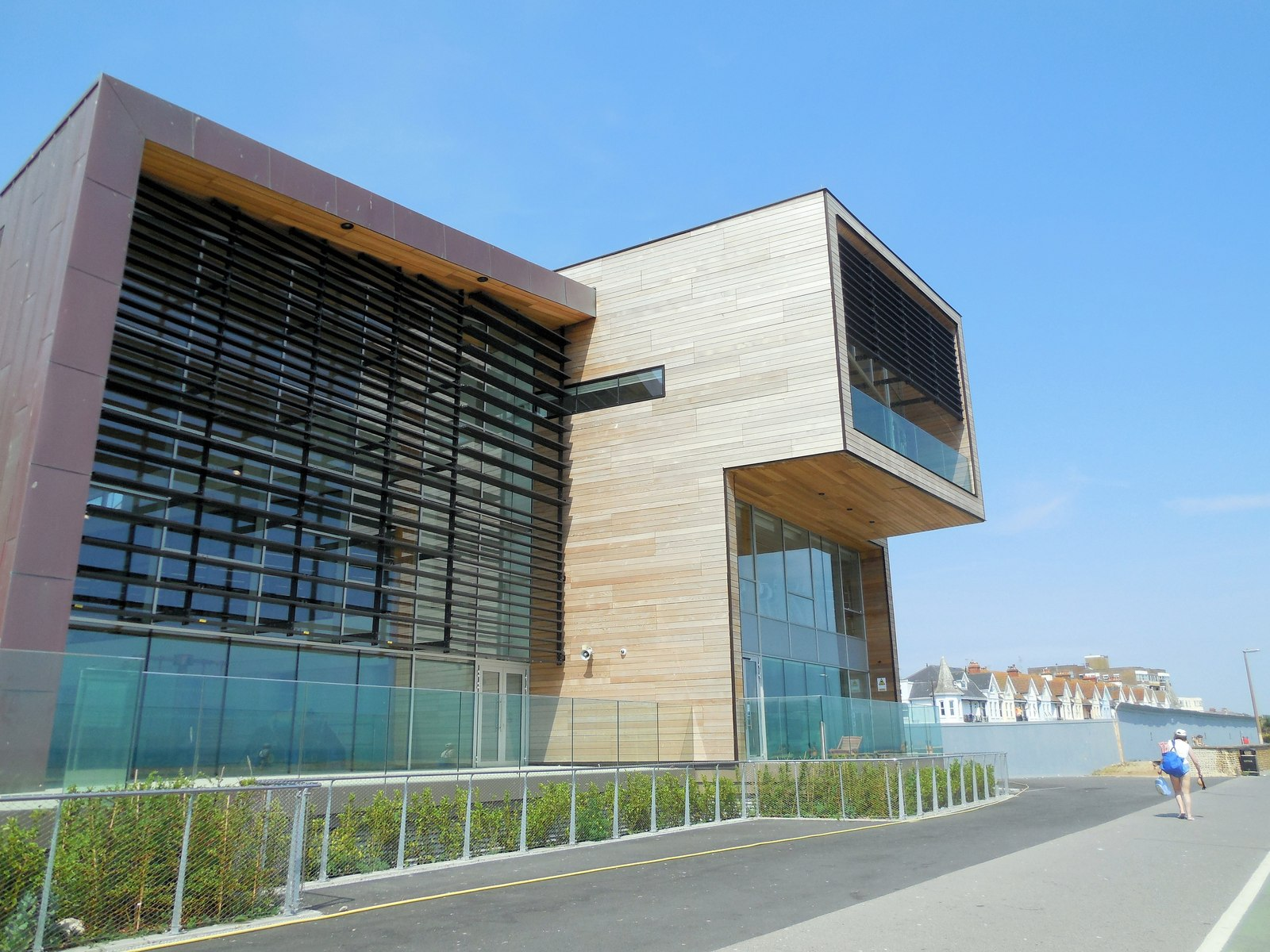
- Interactive map of the Splashpoint Leisure Centre area

General information
- Type: Leisure centre
- Location: Worthing, BN11; United Kingdom, Brighton Road, England, United Kingdom
- Coordinates: 50.8119°N 0.3617°W
- Current tenants: South Downs Leisure
- Construction started: 2011
- Completed: 2013
- Opened: 20 June 2013
- Cost: £17.9 million adjusted for inflation: £25.1 million
- Client: Worthing Borough Council
- Owner: Worthing Borough Council

Height
- Height: 15 metres (49 ft)

Design and construction
- Architecture firm: WilkinsonEyre
- Structural engineer: AECOM
- Quantity surveyor: Davis Langdon
- Main contractor: Morgan Sindall
- Awards: World Architecture Festival 2013, Sport category

Splashpoint Leisure Centre is a leisure centre located in the centre of Worthing, West Sussex, England. It contains a 25-metre long pool and gymnasium. Designed by WilkinsonEyre it won an award at the World Architecture Festival in 2013. WilkinsonEyre won an architectural design competition held by the Royal Institute of British Architects, which attracted 109 expressions of interest.

It was opened by Paralympian swimmer Ellie Simmonds on 20 June 2013.

== Location ==
Splashpoint Leisure Centre lies between Brighton Road to the north and the town's beach and promenade to the south. To the west lies Beach House and its grounds, while to the east lies Bayside, a residential high-rise building.

== Architecture ==
According to Chris Wilkinson, principal architect at WilkinsonEyre, the "building seeks to draw on forms already present in the town, taking on the undulating linearity of the ranks of surrounding terraced houses and the breakwater groynes on the beach."

== See also ==
- Bayside, Worthing
- Beach House, Worthing
