= List of tallest buildings in the United Kingdom by settlement =

This is a list of the tallest buildings in the United Kingdom by settlement. The article includes all cities and towns with a population over 100,000. This list is based on criteria set out by the Council on Tall Buildings and Urban Habitat which excludes structures such as telecommunication towers and chimneys from being labelled as a 'skyscraper or tall building'. The tallest building in the United Kingdom in a settlement with fewer than 100,000 inhabitants is The Triad in Bootle, Merseyside at 88.7 metres (291 ft).

City	Tallest Building(s)	Height (m)	Height (ft)	Floors	Year	Image	Notes
Aberdeen	Marischal College	72	236	4	1906		
Basildon	Brooke House	49	161	15	1962		
Basingstoke	Fanum House	85	279	18	2010		
Belfast	Obel	85	279	28	2010		
Birmingham	The Octagon	155	509	49	2024		
Blackburn	Blackburn Town Hall	53	174	15	1969		
Blackpool	Walter Robinson Court	64	210	22	1972		
Bolton	St Peter's Church	55	180	N/A	1871		
Bournemouth	The Helm	55	180	19	2020		
Bradford	Bradford City Hall	66	217		1914		
Brighton	Sussex Heights	102	334	24	1968		
Bristol	Castle Park View	86	282	26	2022		
Cambridge	Our Lady and the English Martyrs Church	65	213		1890		
Cardiff	Bridge Street Exchange	85	278	26	2018		
Chelmsford	Parkside Court	43	141	13	1962		
Cheltenham	Eagle Tower	49	161	15	1968		
Colchester	University of Essex North and South Towers	43	141	14			
Coventry	CODE Fairfax Street	76.2	250	23	2019		
Derby	University of Derby	40	131	10			
Doncaster	Silverwood House	46	151	17	1969		
Dudley	Darley House	52	171	19	1969		
Dundee	Various	44	144	16	1967 / 1970		
Eastbourne	South Cliff Tower	58	190	19	1965		
Edinburgh	Martello Court	64	210	23	1967		
Exeter	Exeter Cathedral	44	144	N/A	1400		
Glasgow	The Gilbert Scott Building	85	278	6	1891		
Gloucester	Gloucester Cathedral	67	220		1541		
Huddersfield	Holme Park Court; Bishops Court	48	157	17	1967		
Ipswich	The Mill	71	233	23	2009		
Kingston upon Hull	Hull Royal Infirmary	57	187		1967		
Leeds	Altus House	114	374	38	2021		
Leicester	Cardinal Telephone Exchange	84	276	17	1970		
Liverpool	West Tower	140	460	40	2008		
London	The Shard	310	1,017	87	2012		
Luton	Luton Town Hall	50	160	9	1936		
Maidstone	The Creswick	60	187	17	2020		
Manchester	Deansgate Square South Tower	201	659	65	2018		
Middlesbrough	Centre North East	71	233	19	1974		
Milton Keynes	Hotel La Tour	50	164	14	2022		
Newcastle upon Tyne	Hadrian's Tower	83	272	27	2020		
Newport	Newport Civic Centre	55	180		1937		
Northampton	Northampton House	46	151	13			
Norwich	Norwich City Hall	63	206	5	1938		
Nottingham	Victoria Centre Flats A	75	246	25	1972		
Oldham	Oldham Civic Centre	53	175	15	1976		
Oxford	Magdalen Tower	44	144		1509		
Peterborough	Peterborough Cathedral	44	144	N/A	1237	Peterborough Cathedral façade	
Plymouth	Beckley Point	78	255	23	2018		
Poole	Longfleet Nurses Home	43	141	14			
Portsmouth	1 Gunwharf Quays	95	312	26	2008		
Preston	Guild Centre	61	200	15			
Reading	The Blade	59	194	14	2009		
Rochdale	Dunkirk Rise; Mitchell Hey; Tentercroft; Town Mill Brow	64	210	21	1966		
Rotherham	Clifton Flats	40	130	13			
Sheffield	St Paul's Tower	101	331	32	2010		
Slough	Lexington Apartments	49	160	15	2013		
Southampton	Centenary Quay	85	278	27	2022		
Southend-on-Sea	Alexander House	63	207	16	1973		
Stoke-on-Trent	Telecom Building	42	138	11			
Sunderland	Planet House; Astral House; Solar House	60	200	19	1969		
Swansea	The Tower, Meridian Quay	107	351	29	2010		
Swindon	David Murray John Tower	83	272	21	1976		
Telford	Telford Plaza One	48	157	11			
Warrington	Peninsula House			12	1971		
Watford	Abbey View; Munden View	52	171	17	1966		
Woking	Victoria Square Tower 1	117	384	34	2022		
Wolverhampton	Victoria Halls (Building 1)	75	246	25	2009		
Worthing	Bayside	52	172	15	2021		
York	York Minster	71	232	N/A	1472		
