= Hudson-Kinahan baronets =

Extinct baronetcy in the Baronetage of the United Kingdom

- Escutcheon of the Hudson-Kinahan baronets, of Glenville, Wyckham and Merrion Square North
- Creation date: 1887
- Status: extinct
- Extinction date: 1949
- Motto: Deo Fidens Persistas (trusting in God, persevere); Advsersis major (strong in adversity)
- Arms: Quarterly, 1st and 4th: Per bend Gules and Azure, on a cross couped Argent a fleur-de-lis Sable (Kinahan); 2nd and 3rd:Per pale gules and sable, on a fesse or, between three boars' heads couped argent, as many lions rampant of the second (Hudson).
- Crest: 1st, A demi-lion rampant Sable, holding in its paws a battle-axe erect Proper, and charged on the shoulder with a cross couped Or (Kinahan); 2nd, A lion rampant Gules, holding between the forepaws a boar's head couped Argent, and charged on the shoulder with a cross couped Or
- Supporters: Two lions rampant, per fesse Gules and Sable, semee of trefoils slipped Or, collared and charged on the shoulder with a castle of the Last

The Hudson-Kinahan baronetcy, of Glenville in the Parish of Ardnageehy, Barony of Barrymore, in the County of Cork; of Wyckham in the Parish of Taney, Barony of Rathdown, Townland of Dundrum, in the County of Dublin; and of Merrion Square North in the City of Dublin, was a title in the Baronetage of the United Kingdom. It was created on 26 September 1887 for Edward Hudson-Kinahan, high sheriff for the city of Dublin in 1868 and of County Dublin in 1875. Born Edward Kinahan, he assumed the additional surname of Hudson the same year he was created a baronet.

The title became extinct on the death of the 3rd Baronet in 1949.

== Hudson-Kinahan baronets, of Glenville, Wyckham and Merrion Square North (1887) ==
- Sir Edward Hudson Hudson-Kinahan, 1st Baronet (1828–1892)
- Sir Edward Hudson Hudson-Kinahan, 2nd Baronet (1865–1938)
- Sir Robert Henry Hudson-Kinahan, 3rd Baronet (1872–1949)

Baronetage of the United Kingdom
Preceded by Ewart baronets	Hudson-Kinahan baronets of Glenville, Wyckham and Merrion Square North; 26 September 1887	Succeeded by Northcote baronets
