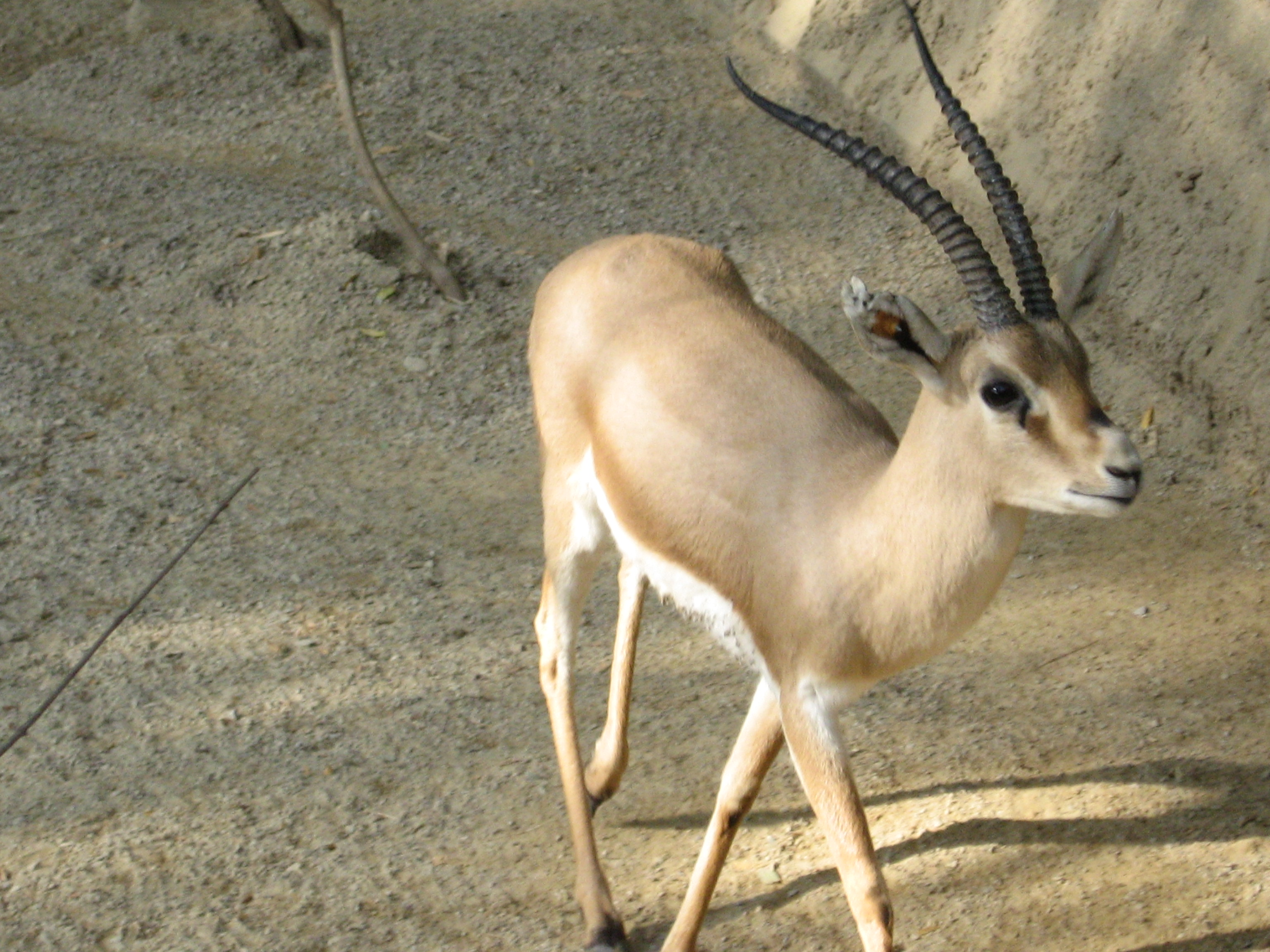
- At the Cincinnati Zoo

Conservation status
- Endangered (IUCN 3.1)
- CITES Appendix I

Scientific classification
- Kingdom: Animalia
- Phylum: Chordata
- Class: Mammalia
- Order: Artiodactyla
- Family: Bovidae
- Subfamily: Antilopinae
- Genus: Gazella
- Species: G. leptoceros

Binomial name
- Gazella leptoceros (F. Cuvier, 1842)

Subspecies
- G. l. leptoceros F. Cuvier, 1842; G. l. loderi Thomas, 1894
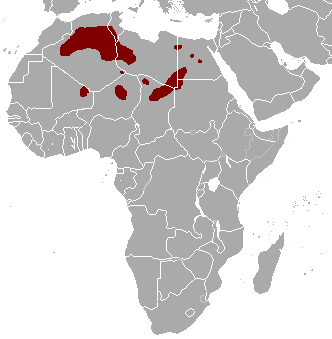
- Distribution map

Synonyms
- G. abuharab Fitzinger, 1869; G. cuvieri Fitzinger, 1869; G. typica P. L. Sclater & Thomas, 1898; G. loderi Thomas, 1894

= Rhim gazelle =

Species of mammal

The rhim gazelle or rhim (from Arabic غزال الريم) (Gazella leptoceros), also known as the slender-horned gazelle, African sand gazelle or Loder's gazelle, is a pale-coated gazelle with long slender horns and well adapted to desert life. It is considered an endangered species because fewer than 2500 are left in the wild. They are found in Algeria, Egypt, Tunisia and Libya, and possibly Chad, Mali, Niger, and Sudan.

== Name ==
According to Richard Lydekker, the name rhim is known in Algeria and Libya, while in Tunisian and Egyptian the animal is known as the ghazal abiad, "white gazelle", owing to its pale coat. The name rhim is cognate with and perhaps derived from the Hebrew term re'em found in the Bible, which may refer to an aurochs, oryx or perhaps a unicorn.

Although described and named by Frédéric Cuvier in 1842, the rhim gazelle was rediscovered by Edmund Giles Loder later in the same century, hence the synonym Gazella loderi and the common name Loder's gazelle.

== Description ==
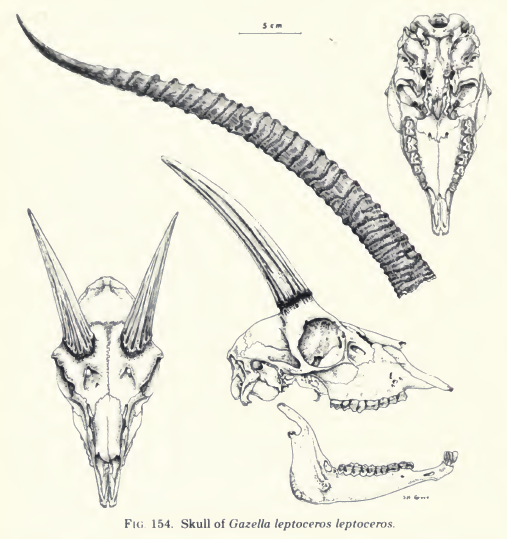

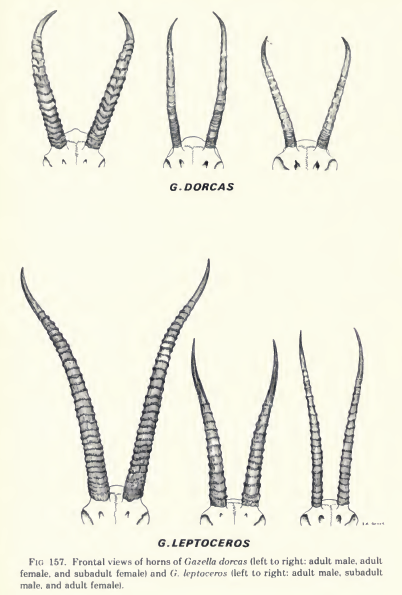
Top: Skull.
Bottom: Horns of a rhim gazelle (below) and Dorcas gazelle (above)

Growing to a length of 101 to 116 cm (40 to 46 in), this is the palest of the gazelles, and well adapted to desert life in many ways. The upper parts are pale buff or cream and the limbs and under parts white or pale buff. The horns on the male are slender and slightly S-shaped; those of the female are even thinner, lighter and nearly straight. There are faint facial markings and an indistinct stripe along the side. The tail is brownish-black, about 15 cm (6 in) long, and contrasts with the pale rump.

== Distribution and habitat ==
The rhim gazelle is known from Algeria, Tunisia, Libya and Egypt. It has also been reported from Niger and Chad, but these sightings seem doubtful and its precise range is unclear. The rhim gazelle is found in isolated pockets across the central Sahara Desert. The extreme heat of this environment limits their feeding to the early morning and evening, and G. leptoceros gains most of its water requirements from dew and plant moisture, relying little on open water sources. The rhim gazelle is a nomadic species, moving across its desert range in search of vegetation, though it does not have a set migratory pattern. Its typical habitat is sand dunes and the depressions between them and other sandy areas, but also rocky areas.

== Physiological adaptations ==
Rhim gazelles use a special type of temperature regulation called heterothermy to survive in this harsh desert climate. With heterothermy, animals no longer keep their body temperature within a narrow range. Heterothermy in Rhim gazelles results in an increase in body temperature during the heat of the day that reduces the amount of evaporative cooling that gazelles would need to do in order to stay cool. By reducing evaporative cooling, gazelles reduce energy expenditure and conserve body water. During cooler temperatures at night, the stored heat can be released, allowing the gazelles' body temperature to decrease back to a normal physiological range. Rhim gazelles maintain a normal skin temperature of about 35-°C in the summer and about 25-°C in the winter. When heterothermy is employed, the gazelle experiences a body temperature increase of 5–20°C depending on seasonal conditions.

== Status ==
Endangered by the early 1970s, this species of gazelle was in serious decline. They were hunted firstly by mounted then by motorized hunters for sport, meat, or their horns, which were sold as ornaments in North African markets. The threats the animals face now include poaching, disturbance by humans and loss of suitable habitat. The International Union for Conservation of Nature estimates there may only be 300 to 600 mature individuals in the wild, and has rated their conservation status as "endangered".

== In philately ==
On February 1, 1987, the Libyan General Posts and Telecommunications Company, in cooperation with World Wide Fund for Nature, issued a set of four postage stamps illustrating Gazella leptoceros.

== Gallery ==
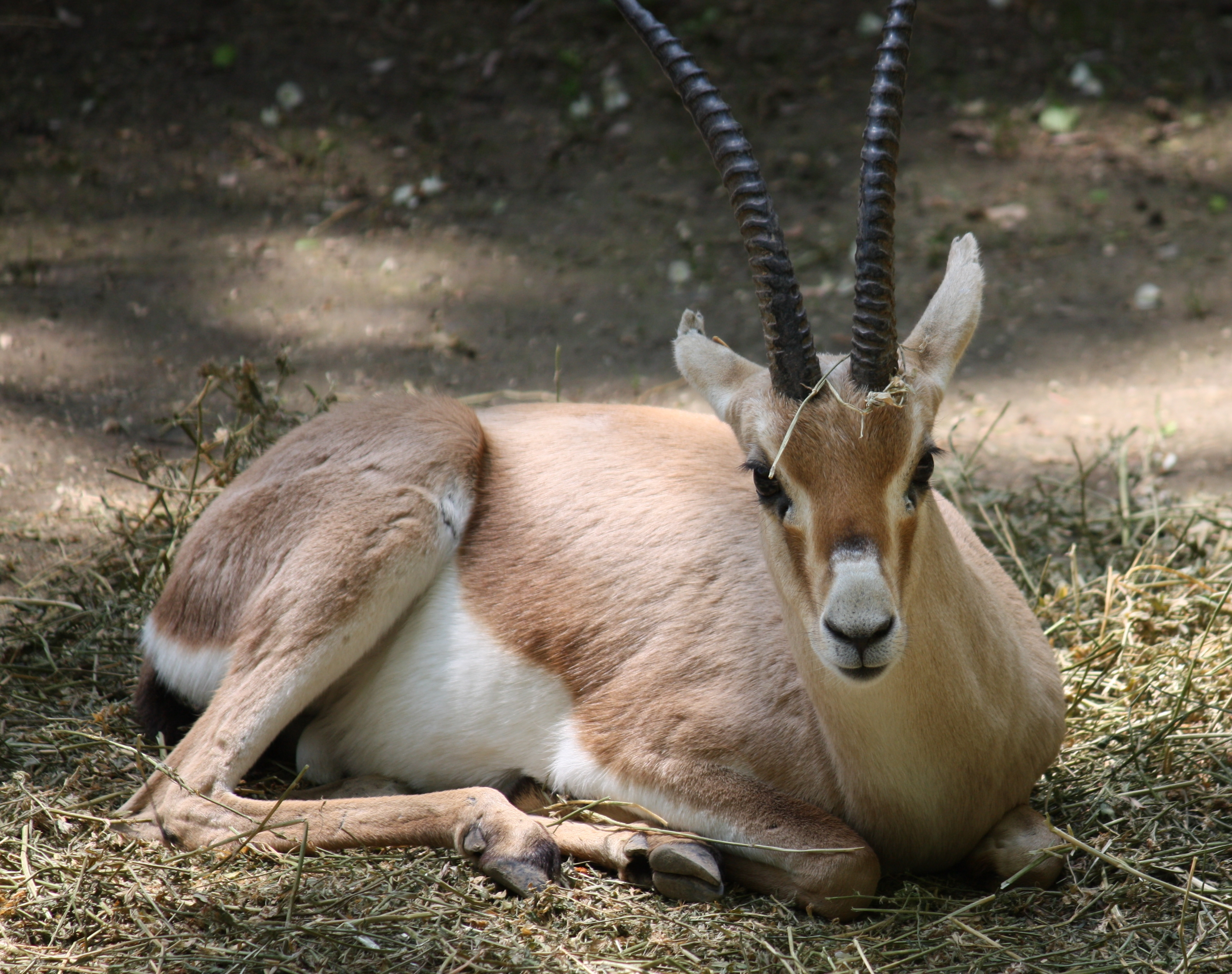
Sitting down, at the Cincinnati Zoo

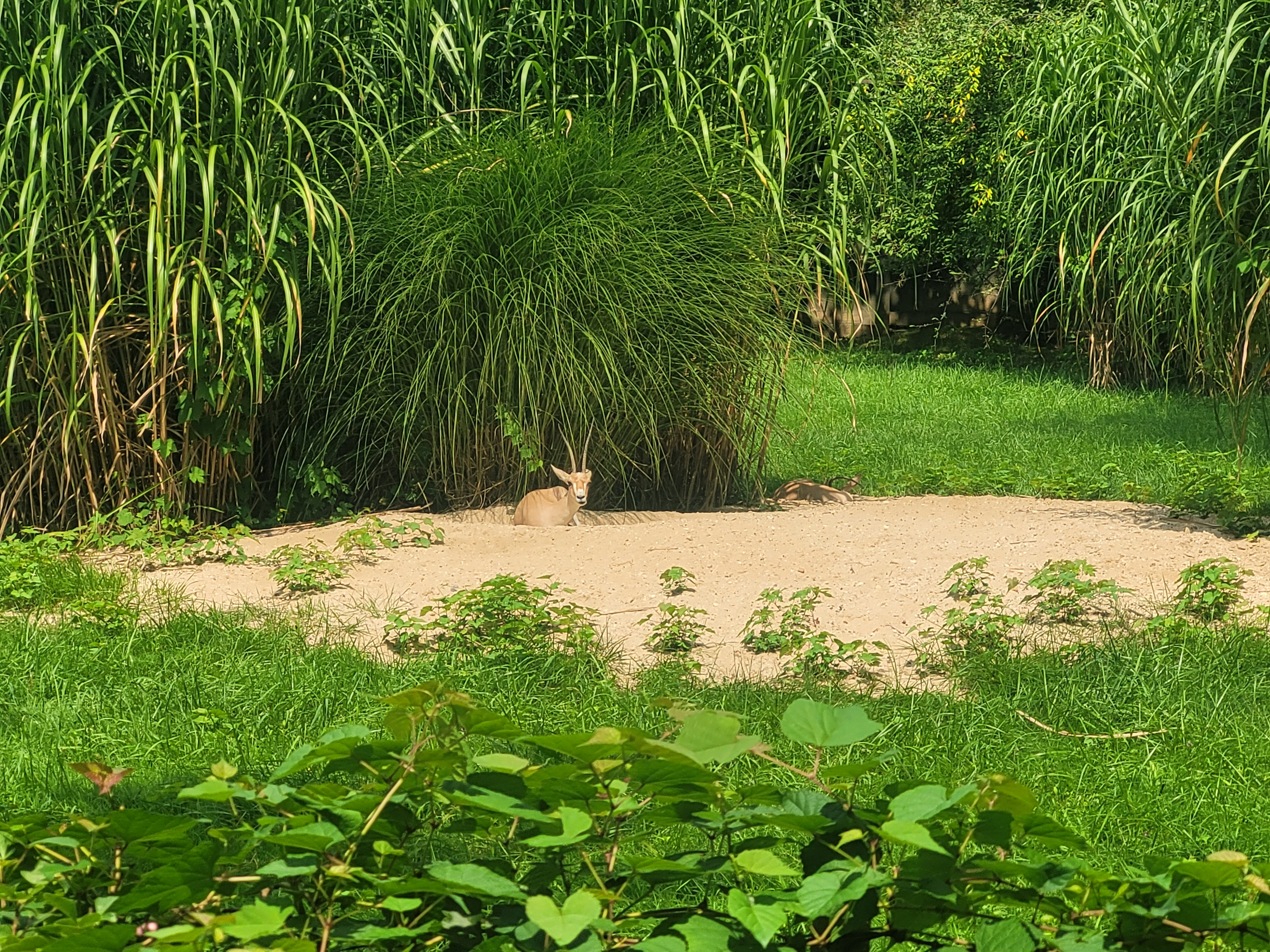
In a sandy dune, at the Bronx Zoo; its tan coat acts as concealment in the desert

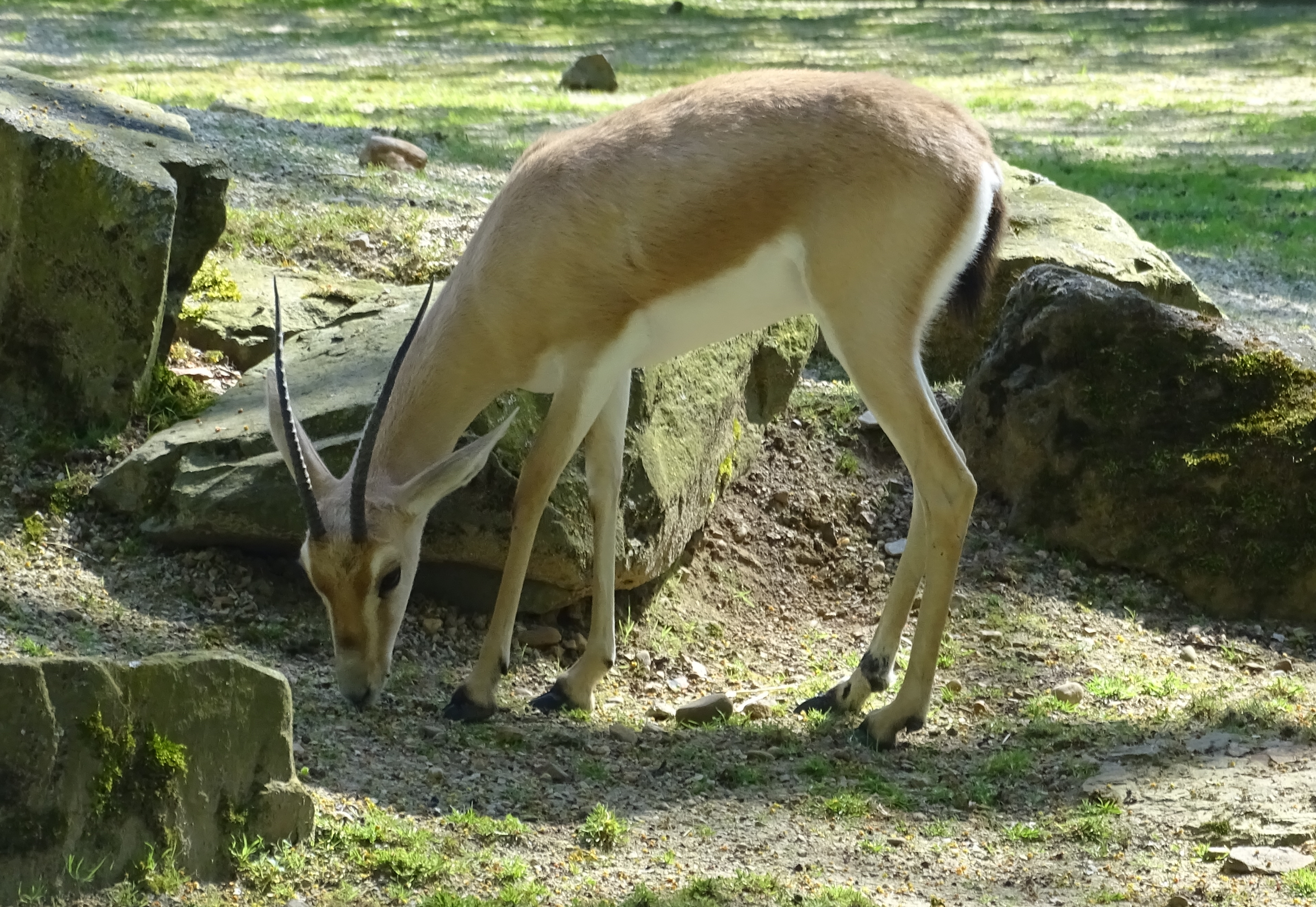
Browsing at Planckendael zoo

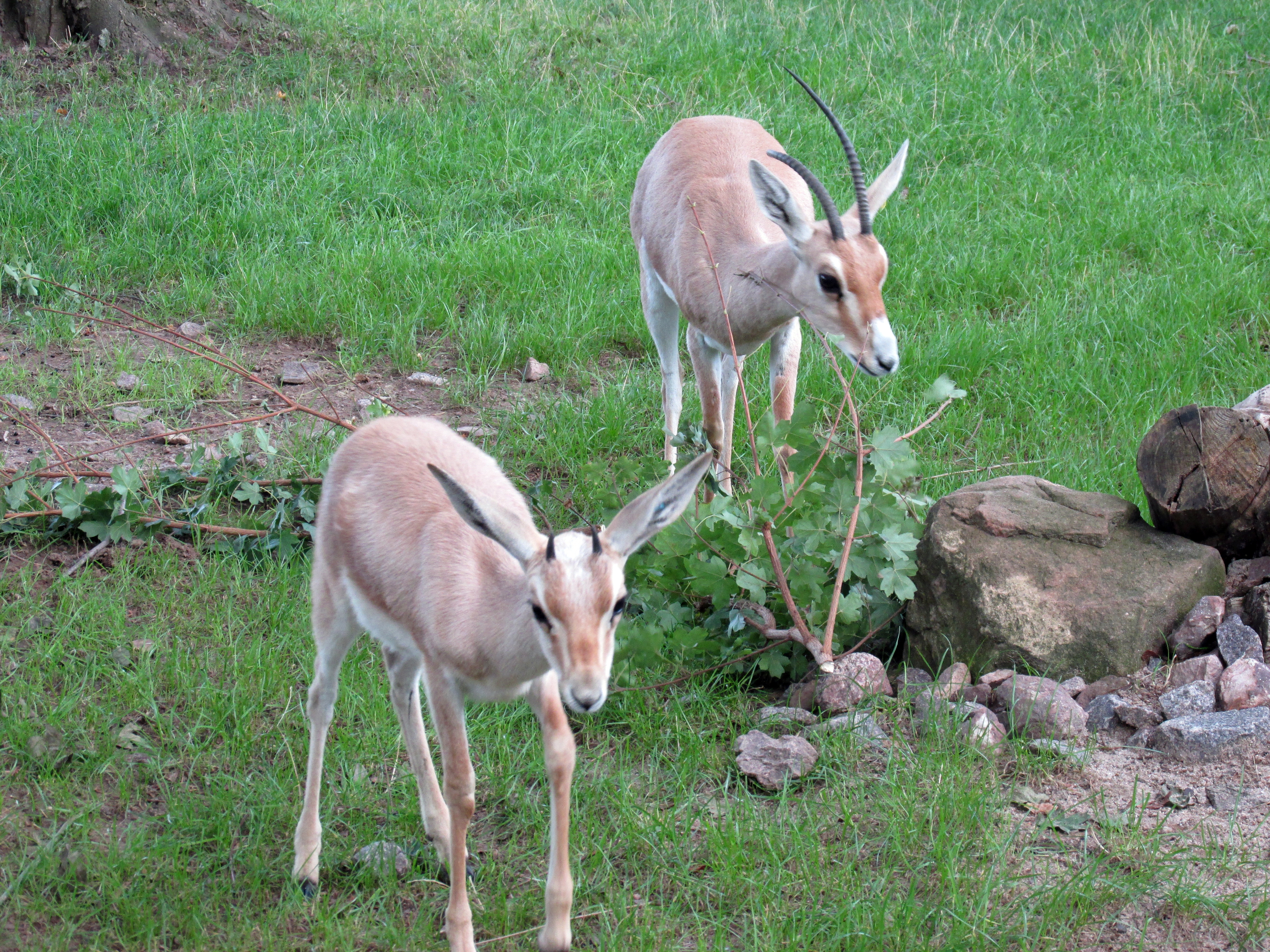
Two gazelles at Landau Zoo
