= Robert Loder =

English businessman and art collector

Robert Beauclerk Loder, CBE (24 April 1934 – 22 July 2017) was an English businessman and art collector. He was particularly concerned in developing contemporary African art.

== Biography ==
Loder was the son of John Loder, 2nd Baron Wakehurst and his wife Margaret Tennant, daughter of Sir Charles Tennant, 1st Baronet. He was educated at Eton College and Cambridge University. From 1957 to 1966 he was employed by the Anglo American Corporation in Johannesburg and Lusaka. While in Johannesburg he helped run Union Artists, a black theatre group that played to mixed audiences in apartheid South Africa. In 1959 he founded the African Arts Trust, which supports black artists from South Africa.

When he returned to London, Loder became treasurer of the Institute of Contemporary Arts and later its chairman in the 1970s. From 1968 he was a Trustee and for 10 years chair of the Mental Health Foundation, for which service he was appointed a CBE in the 1989 Birthday Honours.

With the backing of Lord Rothschild, he built up a business with 2,000 employees in 30 countries. In 1982, he became executive chairman of the literary agency Curtis Brown.

In 1980, Loder met Anthony Caro who was trying to organise an exhibition of British abstract art in South African townships. In 1981, when staying in New York State, the pair developed the idea of running workshops for professional artists, which became the Triangle Arts Trust. They held the first Triangle workshop in 1982 for thirty sculptors and painters from United States, the United Kingdom and Canada at Pine Plains, New York. The workshops became an annual event, and Loder later helped organise similar workshops in South Africa, Zimbabwe, Botswana, Mozambique, Zambia, Jamaica and Namibia. From 1990 he ran a workshop at Shave Farm in Somerset.
