= William Pitt Byrne =

British newspaper editor

William Pitt Byrne (c. 1806 – 6 or 8 April 1861) was a British newspaper editor and proprietor of The Morning Post.

He graduated from Trinity College, Cambridge with a BA and M.A. He was admitted to the Inner Temple in 1835 and called to the bar in 1839 but never practised law.

His father Nicholas Byrne was his predecessor as editor and proprietor of the Morning Post, about whom there is little biographical information in the historical record. Nicholas Byrne took a strongly pro-Conservative editorial stance, and his son was named after William Pitt the Younger. He was mysteriously attacked by a masked intruder and never fully recovered, dying of his injuries in 1833.

His mother was the Gothic novelist Charlotte Dacre, who had three children with Nicholas: William Pitt Byrne (born 1806), Charles (born 1807) and Mary (born 1809); however the children were not baptised until 1811 and Nicholas and Charlotte did not marry until 1 July 1815. William Pitt Byrne was baptised on 8 Jun 1811 at St. Paul's, Covent Garden.

He married the writer Julia Clara Busk on 28 April 1842. Her books were sometimes attributed to "Mrs. William Pitt Byrne", and for this reason some sources (particularly online book sellers) mistakenly attribute authorship of her books to her husband.

He broadened the focus of the Morning Post from being a mostly political journal by including more general topics. He ended his connection with the paper prior to his death to follow literary pursuits, contributing to leading journals.

== Memorial fountain and tomb ==
After his death, his wife and friends built a memorial fountain in his name in 1862 or 1863, at the south end of Bryanston Square in London; the fountain is still in existence and is a Grade II listed monument. The fountain has an associated plaque.

He was buried in St. Mary's Roman Catholic Cemetery at Kensal Green in London.
