= Ewart baronets of Glenmachan House and Glenbank (1887) =

Escutcheon of the Ewart baronets of Glenmachan House and Glenbank

The Ewart baronetcy, of Glenmachan House in the parish of Holywood in the County of Down and of Glenbank in the parish of Belfast in the County of Antrim, was created in the Baronetage of the United Kingdom on 13 September 1887 for Sir William Ewart. He was head of William Ewart & Son, linen manufacturers, of Belfast, Mayor of Belfast, and Member of Parliament for Belfast and Belfast North.

== Ewart baronets, of Glenmachan House and Glenbank (1887) ==
- Sir William Ewart, 1st Baronet (1817–1889)
- Sir William Quartus Ewart, 2nd Baronet (1844–1919)
  - William Quintus Ewart (1877–1900)
- Sir Robert Heard Ewart, 3rd Baronet (1879–1939)
- Sir Lavens Mathewson Algernon Ewart, 4th Baronet (1885–1939)
- Sir Talbot Ewart, 5th Baronet (1878–1959)
- Sir (William) Ivan Cecil Ewart, 6th Baronet (1919–1995)
- Sir William Michael Ewart, 7th Baronet (born 1953)

There is no heir to the title.

== Notes ==
Baronetage of the United Kingdom
Preceded by Gilstrap baronets	Ewart baronets of Glenmachan House and Glenbank; 13 September 1887	Succeeded by Hudson-Kinahan baronets
