= Hans Busk (1815–1882) =

British Army reformer (1815–1882)

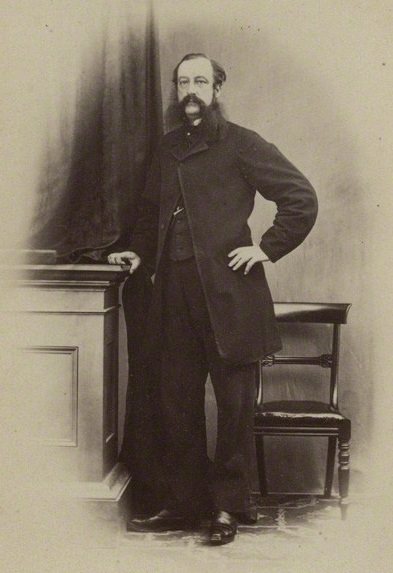
- Busk in the 1860s
- Born: 11 May 1815; London
- Died: 11 March 1882 (aged 66); Westminster
- Known for: Volunteer Force

Hans Busk DL (11 May 1815 – 11 March 1882) an English army reformer and one of the originators of the "Volunteers". He is known as The Younger to distinguish him from his father, a poet.

== Early life and education ==
He was educated at King's College London and Trinity College, Cambridge, graduating with a BA in 1839 and an M.A. in 1844. He was called to the bar at the Middle Temple in 1841.

While still an undergraduate, he lobbied the Government to form rifle clubs for defence against invasion, and created a model rifle club at Cambridge in 1837. This grew into the "Volunteers" movement, which he helped to pioneer. He served with the 1st Middlesex Rifle Volunteers and with the Royal Victoria Rifle Club, and wrote a number of practical manuals regarding rifle training. He was styled "Captain Busk".

He also took an interest in designing yachts and lifeboats, and advocated the installation of lifeboat stations. He was a gastronome, and founded the School of Cookery at South Kensington.

In 1873 he became a Fellow of the Royal Geographical Society.

== Family ==
He was the son of Hans Busk and Maria. His siblings included Julia Clara Pitt Byrne and Rachel Harriette Busk; another sister, Maria Georgiana, married Sir Robert Loder, 1st Baronet.

Another sister, Frances Rosalie, married Rev. Charles Vansittart in May 1845, but the marriage was deeply troubled, and Hans Busk was involved in legal proceedings between his sister and her husband, including the precedent-setting case Vansittart v. Vansittart before the Court of Chancery.

Hans Busk "Barrister-at-Law" died on 11 March 1882 at 21 Ashley Place, Westminster. In his will proved 12th May 1882, he left a personal estate of £22,576 divided in the main, between his nephew Wilfrid Hans Loder and his widowed daughter Annie Mary Moore also of 21 Ashley Place.

Because he had the same name as his father, some well-known reference sources confuse the two. For instance Alumni Cantabrigienses incorrectly states that he is the father, rather than the brother of Rachel Harriette Busk; and the Dictionary of National Biography incorrectly states that he was high sheriff of Radnorshire (a post occupied by his father).

== Works ==
- 1858: The Rifleman's Manual; or, Rifles, and how to use them; 2nd ed. London: Charles Noble
- 1858: The Rifle, and how to use it; 3rd ed. London: Routledge
- 1859: The Rifle, and how to use it; 4th ed. London: Routledge
- (1859) 1971: --do.-- reissue of 4th ed. Richmond, Surrey: Richmond Pub Co.
- 1859: The Navies of the World; their present state, and future capabilities. London: Routledge, Warnes & Routledge
- (1859) 1971:--do.-- reissued: Richmond, Surrey: Richmond Pub Co.
- 1860: Rifle Volunteers: how to organize and drill them; 7th ed. London: Routledge
- 1860: Hand-Book for Hythe [i.e. for the School of Musketry at Hythe]. London: Routledge, Warnes & Routledge
- (1860) 1971: --do.--reissued: Richmond, Surrey: Richmond Pub Co.
