= Ewart Building =

- U.S. National Register of Historic Places
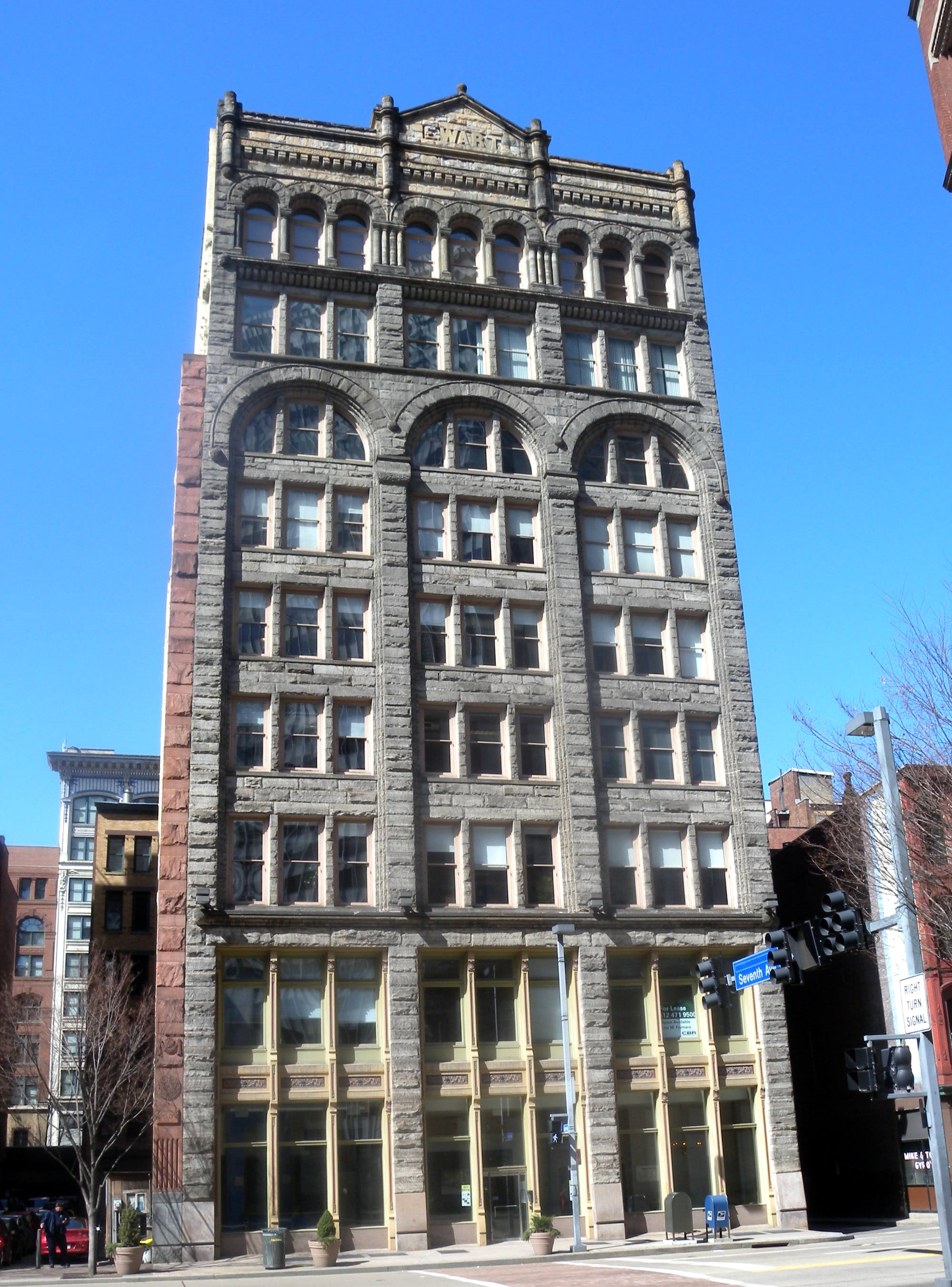

- Location within Pittsburgh Location within Pennsylvania Location within the United States
- Location: 921, 923 and 925 Liberty Ave., Pittsburgh, Pennsylvania
- Coordinates: 40°26′36″N 79°59′52″W
- Area: 0.6 acres (0.24 ha)
- Built: 1891
- Architectural style: Romanesque, Richardsonian Romanesque
- NRHP reference No.: 79002159
- Added to NRHP: August 9, 1979

The Ewart Building is a historic commercial skyscraper located at 921-925 Liberty Avenue in Pittsburgh, Pennsylvania.

== Description and history ==
The building was built in 1891 in the Richardsonian Romanesque style for a wholesale grocer, Samuel Ewart. His family continued to run the business until 1925 and owned the building until 1969. It is built on part of the site of old Fort Fayette.

It was listed on the National Register of Historic Places on August 9, 1979.
