= Beach House, Worthing =

Listed building in West Sussex, England

Beach House
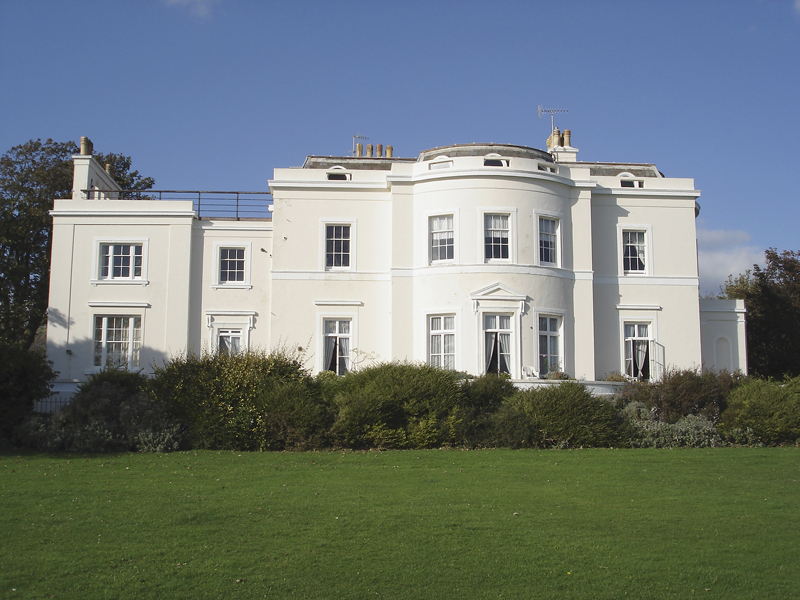
- A view of the rear of Beach House, taken from Beach House grounds

- Location within West Sussex
- Former names: Marino Mansion

General information
- Architectural style: Regency
- Location: Worthing, West Sussex, England
- Coordinates: 50.8119°N 0.3627°W
- Year built: 1820
- Client: Robert Carey Elwes

Design and construction
- Architect: John Rebecca

Listed Building – Grade II*
- Official name: Beach House
- Designated: 3 August 1948
- Reference no.: 1025808

Beach House in Worthing, England is a Regency beach-side villa, built in 1820 to designs by John Rebecca. It was originally known as Marino Mansion. It was built for a man named Robert Cary Elwes.

== History ==
In the mid-19th century, Sir Frederick Adair Roe, Chief Magistrate of the Bow Street office and head of the Bow Street Runners, London's police force, owned and lived in Beach House.

Sir Robert Loder, Conservative Member of Parliament for New Shoreham, lived at Beach House until his death in 1888. His wife, Lady Maria Georgiana Loder and his eldest son Sir Edmund Loder continued to live at Beach House after Sir Robert's death.

Between 1907 and 1910, King Edward VII stayed at the house several times while visiting Sir Edmund Loder and his family.

In 1917 playwright Edward Knoblock bought the house. His visitors included Arnold Bennett, J. B. Priestley, and Sir Compton Mackenzie. Knoblock refurbished the interior and forecourt of the property to the designs of Scottish architect Ormrod Maxwell Ayrton, while displaying furniture from the Thomas Hope collection he had bought from a sale at Deepdene in Dorking, Surrey.

During the Spanish Civil War in 1936, Beach House was used to house children evacuated from their homes in the Basque province of Biscay. The children were fleeing bombing and starvation after the destruction of the town of Guernica by the Nazi Luftwaffe. They were supported and cared for entirely by local volunteers.

From 1939 to 1945, during the Second World War, Beach House was used by the Air Training Corps.

Beach House was designated a Grade II* listed building in 1948.

== The grounds ==
The beach-side open space surrounding the Regency building of Beach House is situated on Brighton Road and was purchased by Worthing Borough Council in December 1927 and laid out in 1937–38. The grounds are 2.78 acres (1.13 ha) and have a playground, two tennis courts and a car park. Beach House gives its name to nearby Beach House Park, opposite Beach House, one of the world's best-known venues for bowls.

== See also ==
- Grade II* listed buildings in West Sussex
- Listed buildings in Worthing
- Peter Pans Playground
