= Hans Busk (1772–1862) =

Welsh poet (1772–1862)

- Born: 28 May 1772
- Died: 8 February 1862 (aged 89)
- Occupation: poet
- Spouse: Maria Green (m. 1814)
- Children: 6; including Hans, Julia and Rachel
- Relatives: Wadsworth Busk (father); William Busk (brother); George Busk (nephew)
- Writing career
- Period: 1814–1834

Hans Busk (28 May 1772 – 8 February 1862) was a Welsh poet, who published poems during the period 1814–1834. He is known as The Elder to distinguish him from his son, who pioneered the Volunteer Force of the British Army.

== Career ==
His poems included titles such as "The Banquet", "The Dessert" and "The Vestriad". Although obscure today, they did receive some attention at the time, for instance "The Banquet" and "The Vestriad" were reviewed in the Literary Gazette, the latter on the front page.

Hans Busk lived at Glenalder Hall (or Glenalders), Nantmel, Radnorshire, Wales, and was a justice of the peace. He served as High Sheriff of Radnorshire in 1837. He later lived at Culverden Grove, Tunbridge Wells, Kent.

He lived for many years at Great Cumberland Place, near Hyde Park in the City of Westminster, where he died in 1862.

== Family ==
He was the youngest son of Sir Wadsworth Busk and Alice, daughter of Edward Parish. His father served as Attorney General of the Isle of Man for more than twenty years, where Hans received his early education. The family lived in Newtown. His grandfather Jacob Hans Busk was an immigrant from Sweden or Norway.

In April or May 1814 he married Maria, daughter of Joseph Green. His children were:

- Hans Busk (1815–1882), Army reformer
- Amelia Sophia Crawford (1817–1896)
- Julia Clara Pitt Byrne (1819 – 1894)
- Frances Rosalie Vansittart (1820–1899), involved in the important legal case Vansittart v. Vansittart against her husband in the Court of Chancery
- Maria Georgiana Loder (1826-1907), wife of Sir Robert Loder, 1st Baronet
- Rachel Harriette Busk (1831—1907)

The book Converts to Rome separately lists all five of Busk's daughters as having converted to Catholicism, although in the case of Maria Georgiana it was when she was in her seventies.
