= Baron Wakehurst =

Barony in the Peerage of the United Kingdom

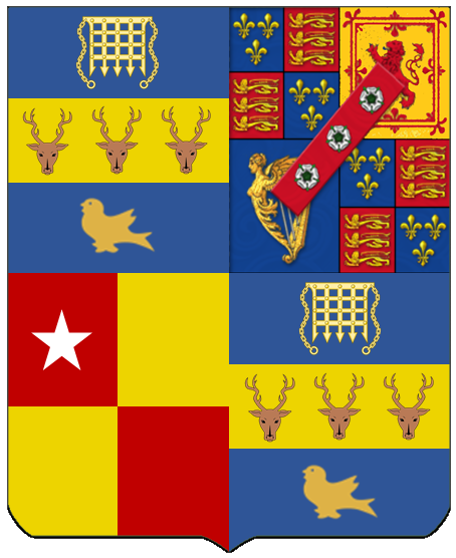
- Quarterly: 1st and 4th grandquarters: Azure on a Fess between in chief a Portcullis chained and in base a Martlet Or three Stags' Heads caboshed proper (Loder); 2nd grandquarter: the Royal Arms of King Charles II, viz. quarterly 1st and 4th. France and England quarterly; 2nd, Scotland; 3rd, Ireland, and overall a Baton Sinister Gules charged with three Roses Argent barbed and seeded proper (Beauclerk); 3rd grandquarter: per quarter Gules and Or in the first quarter a Mullet Argent (de Vere)
- Creation date: 29 June 1934
- Created by: King George V
- Peerage: Peerage of the United Kingdom
- First holder: Gerald Loder
- Present holder: John James Loder, 5th Baron Wakehurst
- Heir presumptive: Hon. Nicholas Loder
- Subsidiary titles: Baronet of Whittlebury and High Beeches
- Status: Extant
- Former seat: Wakehurst Place
- Motto: MURUS AENEUS CONSCIENTIA SANA (A sound conscience is a wall of brass)

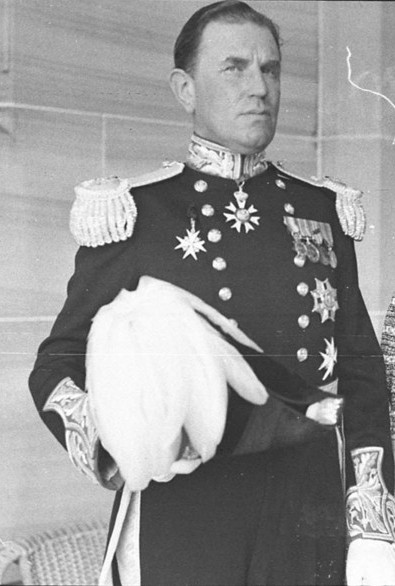
John Loder, 2nd Baron Wakehurst.

Baron Wakehurst, of Ardingly in the County of Sussex, is a title in the Peerage of the United Kingdom. It was created on 29 June 1934 for the Conservative politician Gerald Loder, fifth son of Sir Robert Loder, 1st Baronet (see Loder Baronets for earlier history of the family). He had previously represented Brighton in the House of Commons and was the creator of Wakehurst Place Gardens in Ardingly, West Sussex. His only son, the second Baron, was also a Conservative politician and served as Governor of New South Wales and later as Governor of Northern Ireland. The third baron, who was known by his middle name Christopher, was a barrister and businessman. As of 2025 the title is held by the latter's nephew Jan, the fifth Baron.

== Barons Wakehurst (1934) ==
- Gerald Walter Erskine Loder, 1st Baron Wakehurst (1861–1936)
- John de Vere Loder, 2nd Baron Wakehurst (1895–1970)
- John Christopher Loder, 3rd Baron Wakehurst (1925–2022)
- Timothy Walter Loder, 4th Baron Wakehurst (1958–2024)
- John James Loder, 5th Baron Wakehurst (born 1977)

The heir presumptive is the current holder's brother, the Hon. Nicholas Loder (born 1986).

== See also ==
- Loder Baronets, of Whittlebury and of High Beeches
- Wakehurst Place, formerly owned by the first Lord Wakehurst
