= John Akehurst (photographer) =

American photographer

John Akehurst is a photographer who specializes in fashion, beauty, and advertising.

== Biography ==
He studied mathematics at the University of Nottingham. After graduation he moved to New York where worked as an assistant to Steven Meisel and Albert Watson. He moved to London, eventually publishing the story "The Egg" in The Face in 1997.
