= Sir Robert Loder, 1st Baronet =

English landowner, magistrate and Conservative politician

Robert Loder
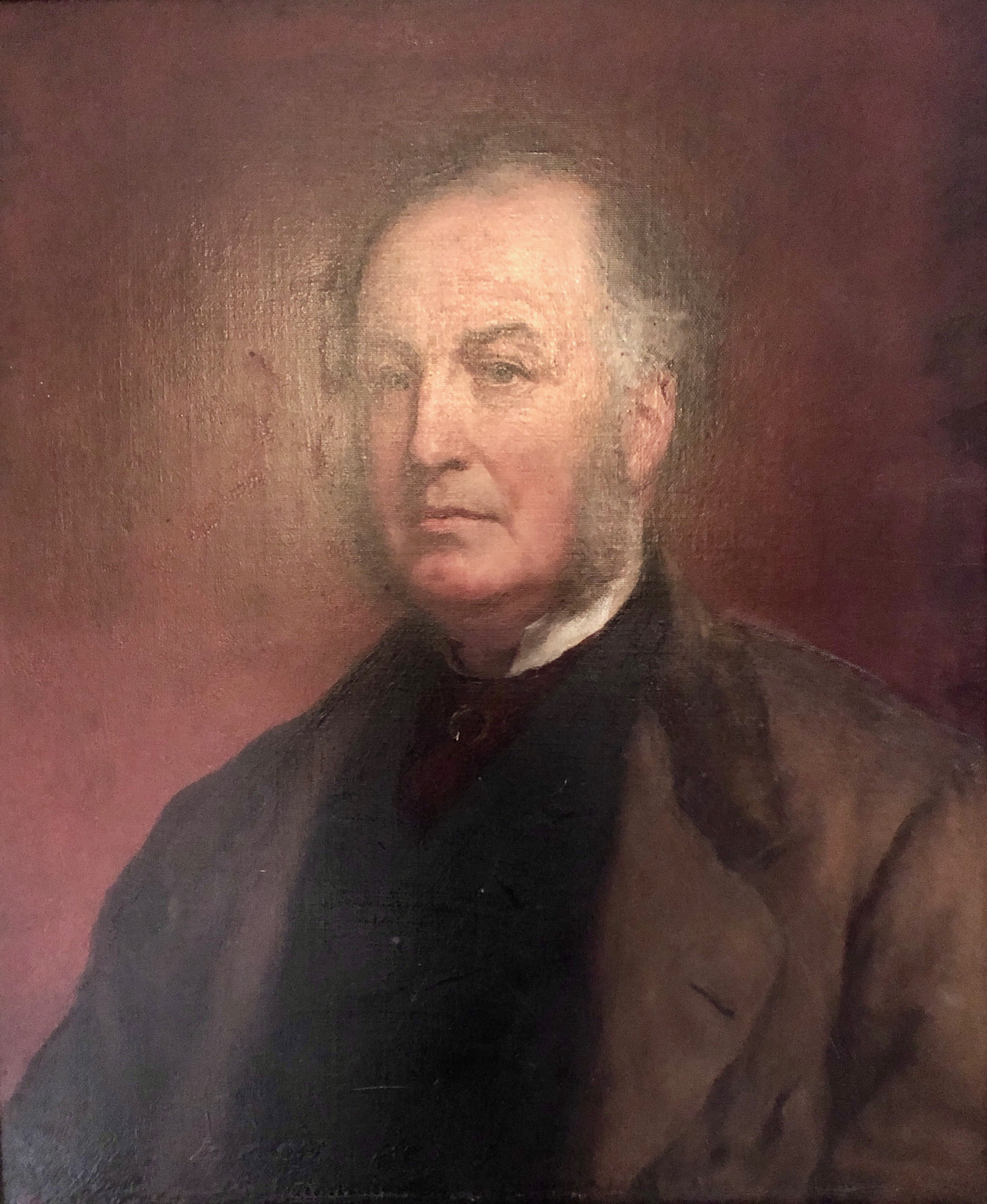
- Born: 7 August 1823; Saint Petersburg, Russia
- Died: 27 May 1888 (aged 64); Worthing, West Sussex, England
- Education: Emmanuel College, Cambridge
- Occupations: Landowner; Magistrate; Politician
- Spouse: Maria Georgiana Busk
- Parent(s): Giles Loder; Elizabeth Higgbotham
- Relatives: Hans Busk (father-in-law)

Sir Robert Loder, 1st Baronet, DL, JP (7 August 1823 – May 1888) was an English landowner, magistrate and Conservative politician. Loder is a Member of the Loder (Family)

== Biography ==
=== Early life ===
Robert Loder was born on 7 August 1823 in Saint Petersburg, Russia. His father was Giles Loder (1786–1871) of Wilsford near Salisbury in Wiltshire, and his mother, Elizabeth Higgbotham (unknown-1848), daughter of John Higgbotham, of Saint Petersburg. He was educated at Emmanuel College, Cambridge.

=== Inheritance ===
He inherited a considerable fortune from his father and had extensive estates in Northamptonshire and Sussex as well as in Russia and Sweden.

=== Career ===
He was a Justice of the Peace and Deputy Lieutenant for Sussex and a JP for Northamptonshire. In 1877, he served as the High Sheriff of Sussex.

At the 1880 general election, he was elected Member of Parliament for New Shoreham. He held the seat until 1885. In 1887 Loder was created a Baronet, of Whittlebury in the County of Northampton, and of High Beeches in Slaugham in the County of Sussex.

He was for three seasons, Master of the Crawley and Horsham Foxhounds.

=== Personal life ===
He married Maria Georgiana Busk (1826–1907), fourth daughter of Hans Busk (1772–1862), a Welsh poet. Sir Robert and Lady Loder had ten children:

- Sir Edmund Giles Loder, 2nd Baronet (1849–1920). He married Marion Hubbard. They had had two children:
  - Patience Marion Loder (1882–1963). She married Walter William Otter (1879-1940).
  - Robert Egerton Loder (1887–1917). He married Muriel Rolls Hoare (1879–1955). They had one son:
    - Sir Giles Rolls Loder, 3rd Baronet (1914–1999). He married Marie Violet Pamela Symons-Jeune (unknown-2005). They had two sons:
      - Sir Edmund Jeune Loder, 4th Baronet (born 1941).
      - Robert Reginald Loder (born 1943).
- Wilfrid Hans Loder (1851–1902).
- Etheldreda Mary Loder (1853–1921). She married Sir Charles Raymond Burrell, 6th Baronet on 22 July 1872
- Lt.-Col. Alfred Basil Loder (1855–1905). His daughter Audrey Kathleen married Horace Lambart, 11th Earl of Cavan.
- Clare Robert Loder (1857–1857).
- Adela Maria Loder (1859–1915). She married, firstly, Maj.-Gen. Hon. Alexander Stewart, son of Randolph Stewart, 9th Earl of Galloway. She married, secondly, Colonel Basil Lloyd-Anstruther, son of Captain James Hamilton Lloyd-Anstruther and Hon. Georgiana Christiana Barrington, daughter of George Barrington, 5th Viscount Barrington.
- Gerald Loder, 1st Baron Wakehurst (1861–1936). He married Lady Louise de Vere Beauclerk, eldest daughter of William Beauclerk, 10th Duke of St Albans, in 1890.
- Reginald Bernhard Loder (1864–1931). He married Lady Margaret Ernestine Augusta Hare, daughter of William Hare, 3rd Earl of Listowel. Their daughter Marjorie Kathleen married Lt.-Col. Cuthbert Henry Dawnay, son of Hon. Eustace Henry Dawnay, son of William Dawnay, 7th Viscount Downe and Lady Evelyn de Vere Capell.
- Sydney Loder (1867–1944).
- Major Eustace Loder(1867–1914).

Sir Robert and Lady Loder had a number of homes, including Beach House in Worthing, West Sussex where Sir Robert died in May 1888, at the age of sixty-four, and was buried in the churchyard of Whittlebury, where he had restored the church.

=== Family inter-marriage ===
On 2 March 1905, "The Dowager Lady Loder" was a guest at the wedding of her granddaughter, Miss Mary Emma Burrell, daughter of the Sir Charles Raymond Burrell, 6th Baronet to Alan Cecil Lupton, a grandson of Lady Loder's first cousin, Anna Jane Lupton (née Busk, 1813–1888). Mr and Mrs Alan Cecil Lupton were third cousins, both being descended from Sir Wadsworth Busk, Sir Robert Loder's grandfather-in-law. Lady Loder died 15 November 1907.

Parliament of the United Kingdom
Preceded by Sir Walter Burrell, Bt; Sir Stephen Cave	Member of Parliament for New Shoreham; 1880 – 1885; With: Sir Walter Burrell, Bt	Constituency abolished
Baronetage of the United Kingdom
New creation	Baronet (of Whittlebury and High Beeches); 1887–1888	Succeeded by Edmund Giles Loder
