= Feltham (surname) =

Feltham is an English surname derived from either of two places: one in Middlesex and the other in Somerset. Notable people with the surname include:

- Aaron Feltham, multiple people
- Arthur Feltham (fl. 1926–1930), English rugby league footballer
- Christopher Feltham (born 1972), Australian-born English cricketer
- Dennis Feltham Jones (1918–1981), British science fiction writer
- Gerald A. Feltham (1938–2019), Canadian accounting researcher and educator
- George Feltham Hopkins (1856–1897), Australian Politician
- Herbert Feltham (1920–1994), South African cricketer
- John Feltham (fl. 1780–1803), English writer
- John Feltham Archibald (1856–1919), Australian journalist and publisher
- John Feltham Danneley (1785–c. 1835), English writer
- Louise Feltham (1935–2020), Canadian Politician
- Lyndsay Feltham, Jersey Politician
- Mark Feltham (born 1955), English musician
- Mark Feltham (born 1963), English first-class cricketer
- Oliver Feltham, Australian philosopher
- Owen Feltham (1602–1668), English writer
- Paul Feltham (1948–2019), Australian rules footballer and coach
- Percy Feltham (1902-1986), Australian Politician
- Stanley Feltham (1896–1971), chief architect in Hong Kong
- Walter Feltham (1864–1904), English cricketer
