= Classical music =

Broad tradition of Western art music

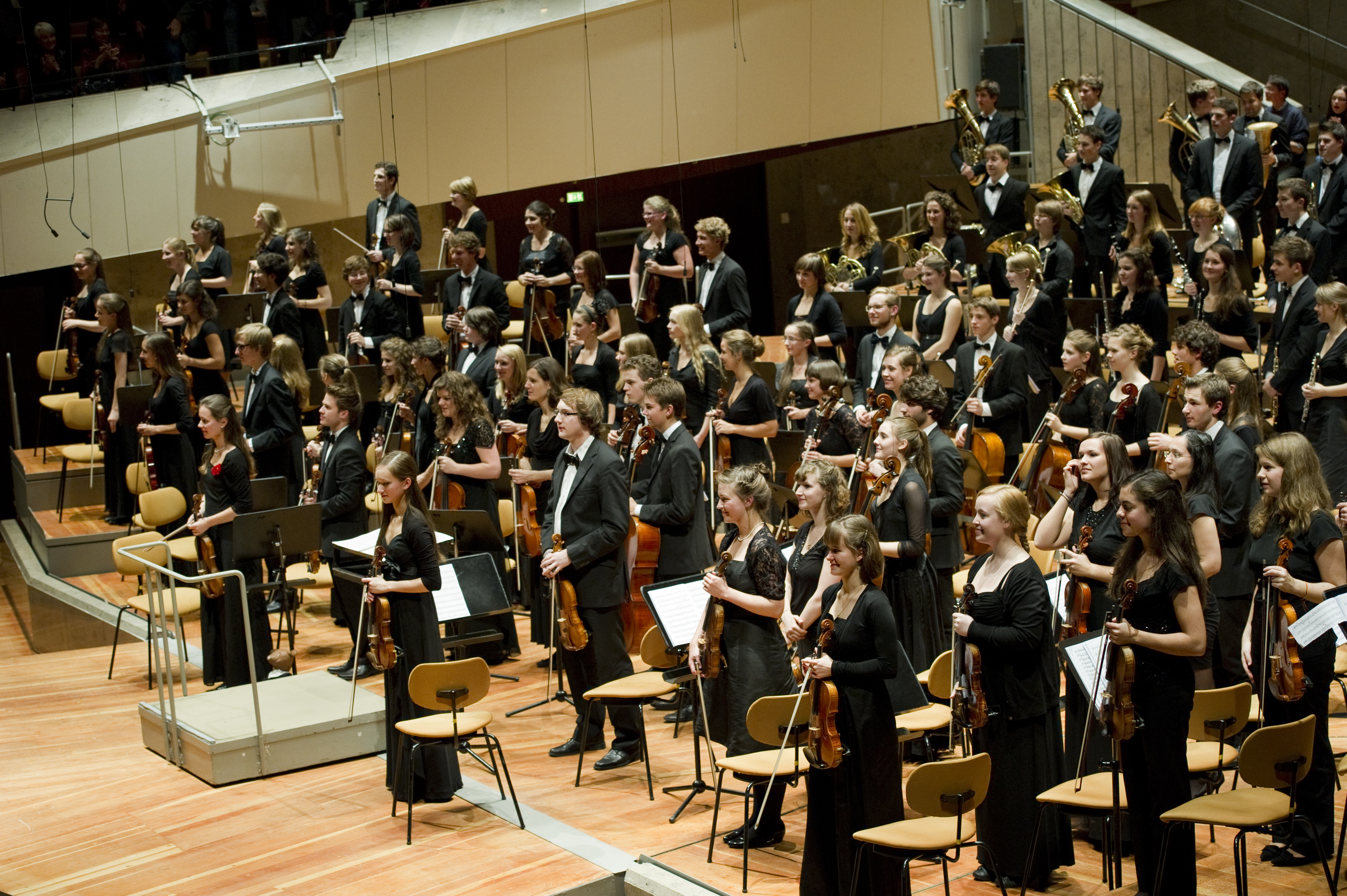
Members of a youth orchestra standing to acknowledge applause after performing.

Classical music is a tradition of art music in the Western world, considered to be distinct from Western folk music or popular music. It is sometimes distinguished as Western classical music, as the term "classical music" can also be applied to non-Western art musics. Classical music is often characterized by formality and complexity in its musical form and harmonic organization, particularly with the use of polyphony. Since at least the ninth century, it has been primarily a written tradition, spawning a sophisticated notational system, as well as accompanying literature in analytical, critical, historiographical, musicological and philosophical practices.

Rooted in the patronage of churches and royal courts in Europe, surviving early medieval music is chiefly religious, monophonic and vocal. The earliest extant music manuscripts date from the Carolingian Empire (800–887), around the time which Western plainchant gradually unified into what is termed Gregorian chant. Musical centers existed at the Abbey of Saint Gall, the Abbey of Saint Martial and Saint Emmeram's Abbey, while the 11th century saw the development of staff notation and increasing output from medieval music theorists. By the mid-12th century, France became the major European musical center: the religious Notre-Dame school first fully explored organized rhythms and polyphony, while secular music flourished with the troubadour and trouvère traditions led by poet-musician nobles. This culminated in the court-sponsored French ars nova and Italian Trecento, which evolved into ars subtilior, a stylistic movement of extreme rhythmic diversity. Beginning in the early 15th century, Renaissance composers of the influential Franco-Flemish School built on the harmonic principles in the English contenance angloise, bringing choral music to new standards, particularly the mass and motet. Northern Italy soon emerged as the central musical region, where the Roman School engaged in highly sophisticated methods of polyphony in genres such as the madrigal, which inspired the brief English Madrigal School.

The Baroque period (1580–1750) saw the relative standardization of common-practice tonality, as well as the increasing importance of musical instruments, which grew into ensembles of considerable size. Italy remained dominant, being the birthplace of opera, the soloist centered concerto genre, the organized sonata form as well as the large scale vocal-centered genres of oratorio and cantata. The fugue technique championed by Johann Sebastian Bach exemplified the Baroque tendency for complexity, and as a reaction the simpler and song-like galant music and empfindsamkeit styles were developed. In the shorter but pivotal Classical period (1750–1820), composers such as Wolfgang Amadeus Mozart, Joseph Haydn, and Ludwig van Beethoven created widely admired representatives of absolute music, including symphonies, string quartets and concertos. The subsequent Romantic music (1800–1910) focused instead on programmatic music, for which the art song, symphonic poem and various piano genres were important vessels. During this time virtuosity was celebrated, immensity was encouraged, while philosophy and nationalism were embedded—all aspects that converged in the operas of Richard Wagner.

By the 20th century, stylistic unification gradually dissipated while the prominence of popular music greatly increased. Many composers actively avoided past techniques and genres in the lens of modernism, with some abandoning tonality in place of serialism, while others found new inspiration in folk melodies or impressionist sentiments. After World War II, for the first time audience members valued older music over contemporary works, a preference which has been catered to by the emergence and widespread availability of commercial recordings. Trends of the mid-20th century to the present day include New Simplicity, New Complexity, Minimalism, Spectral music, and more recently Postmodern music and Postminimalism. Increasingly global, practitioners from the Americas, Africa and Asia have obtained crucial roles, while symphony orchestras and opera houses now appear across the world.

== Terminology and definition ==
=== Ideological origins ===
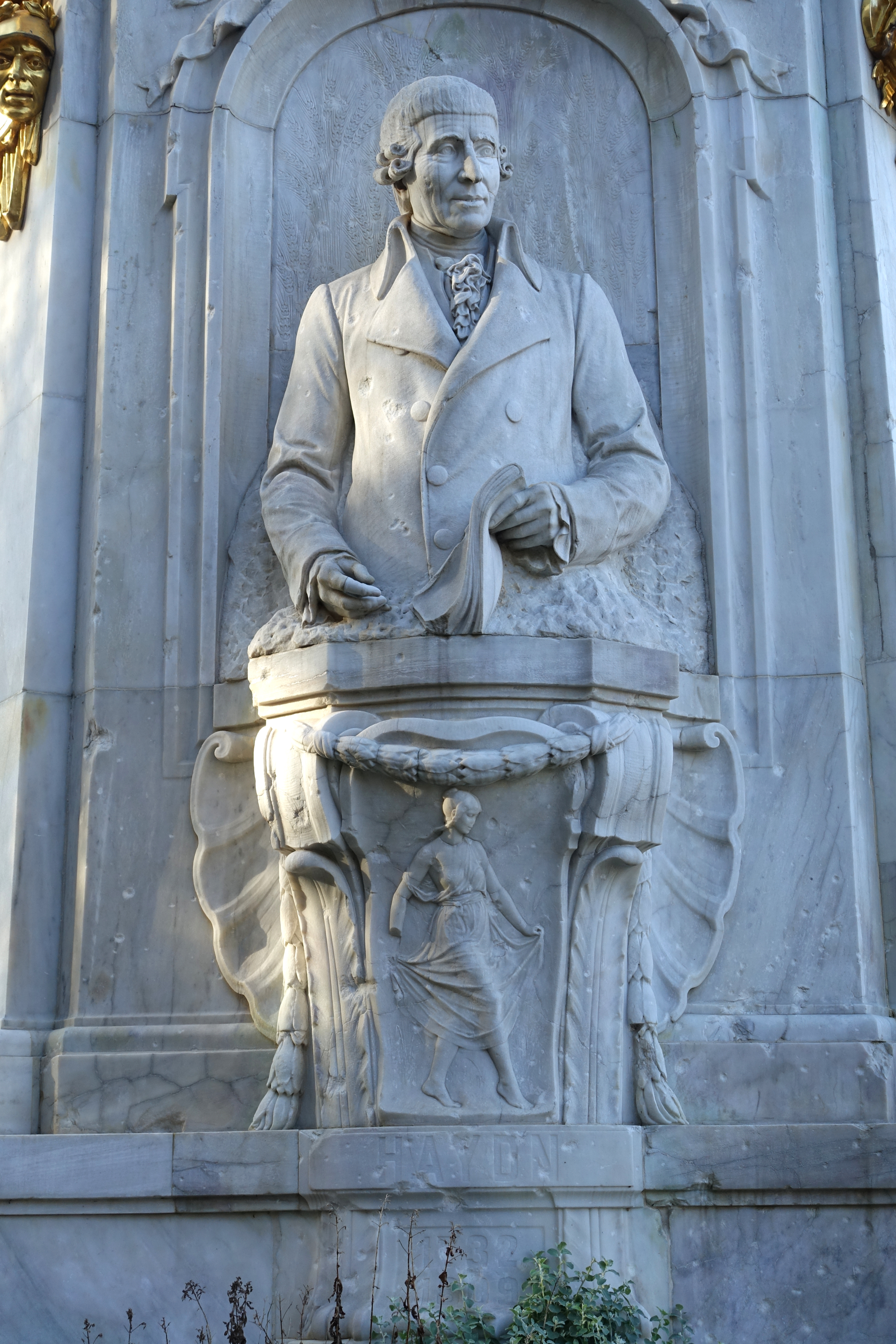
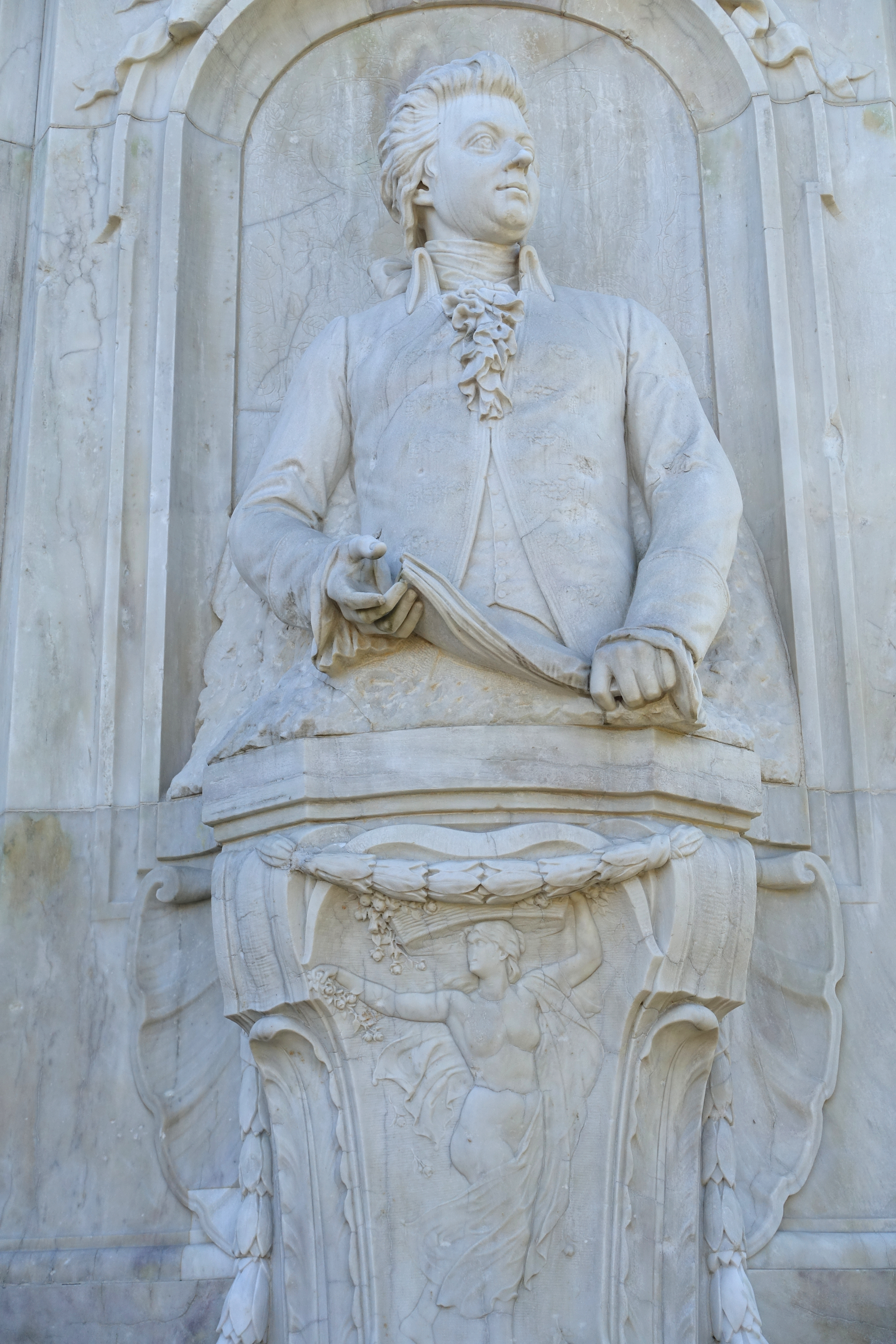
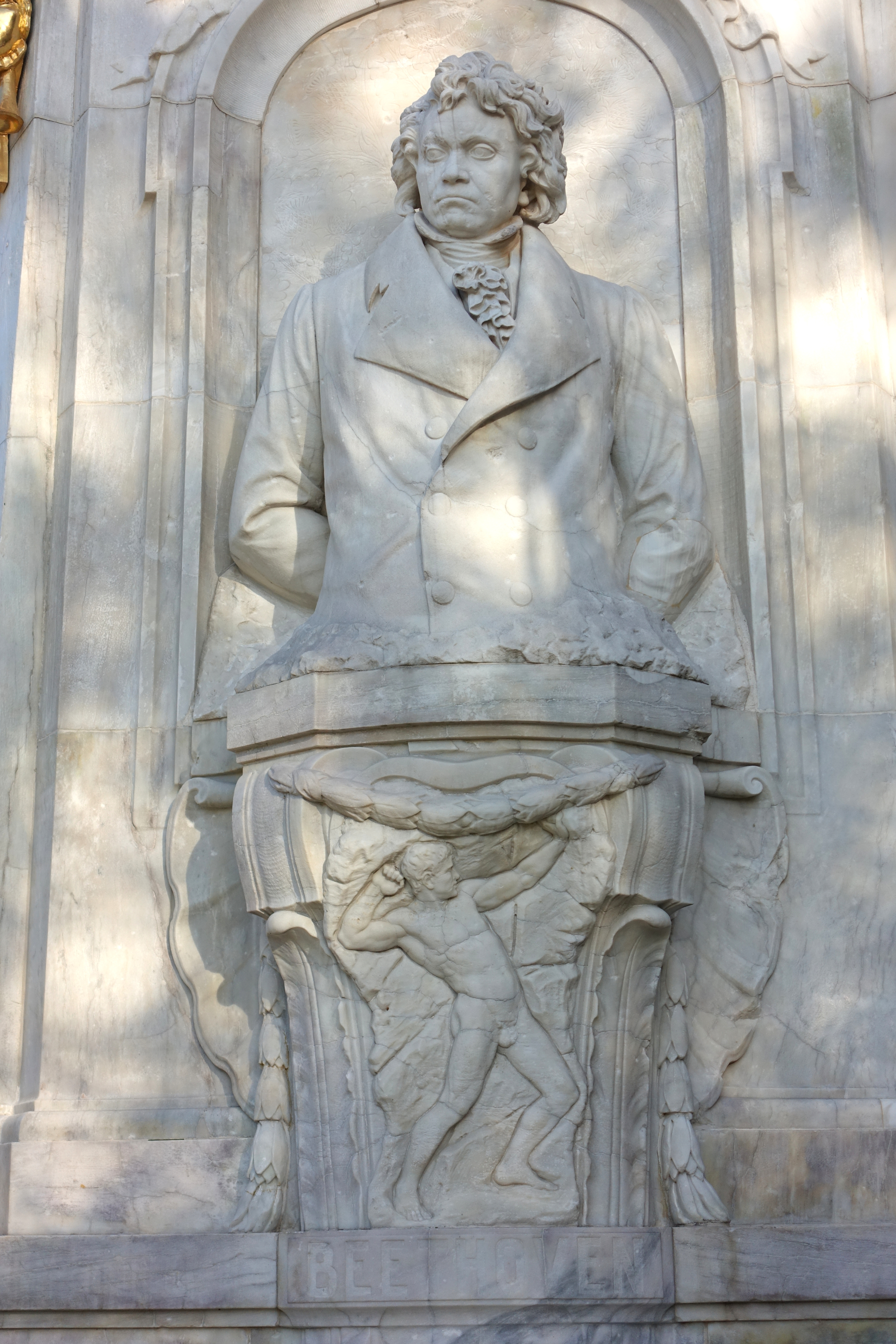
(From left to right) Haydn, Mozart and Beethoven from the 1904 Beethoven–Haydn–Mozart Memorial. The three are part of the First Viennese School and among the first composers to be referred to as "Classical".

Both the English term classical and the German equivalent Klassik developed from the French classique, itself derived from the Latin word classicus, which originally referred to the highest class of Ancient Roman citizens. (Note: The Ancient Roman citizenship classes in question were derived from the guidelines set forth by the legendary king Servius Tullius in the Servian constitution.) In Roman usage, the term later became a means to distinguish revered literary figures; the Roman author Aulus Gellius commended writers such as Demosthenes and Virgil as classicus. By the Renaissance, the adjective had acquired a more general meaning: an entry in Randle Cotgrave's 1611 A Dictionarie of the French and English Tongues is among the earliest extant definitions, translating classique as "classical, formall [sic], orderlie, in due or fit ranke. Also, approved, authenticall, chiefe, principall". The musicologist Daniel Heartz summarizes this into two definitions: 1) a "formal discipline" and 2) a "model of excellence". Like Gellius, later Renaissance scholars who wrote in Latin used classicus in reference to writers of classical antiquity; (Note: In 1690, many decades after Cotgrave's 1611 definition, Antoine Furetière's posthumous Dictionnaire universel echoed Aulus Gellius in praising Cicero, Julius Caesar, Sallust, Virgil, and Horace and referring to them as classique.) however, this meaning only gradually developed, and was for a while subordinate to the broader classical ideals of formality and excellence. Literature and visual arts, for which substantial Ancient Greek and Roman examples existed, did eventually adopt the term "classical" as relating to classical antiquity, but virtually no music of that time was available to Renaissance musicians, limiting the connection between classical music and the Greco-Roman world. (Note: This is why the Neoclassicism movement of the mid 18th-century was widespread in fields such as architecture and painting but not music.)

It was in 18th-century England that the term 'classical' "first came to stand for a particular canon of works in performance." London had developed a prominent public concert music scene, unprecedented and unmatched by other European cities. The royal court had gradually lost its monopoly on music, in large part from instability that the Commonwealth of England's dissolution and the Glorious Revolution enacted on court musicians. (Note: Before the beginning of the 18th-century, there was a brief flowering of court music following the Stuart Restoration. Composers such as Matthew Locke and later Henry Purcell found considerable success, particularly with the popular court masques.) In 1672, the former court musician John Banister began giving popular public concerts at a London tavern; (Note: John Banister's concerts quickly gained popularity, allowing him to later move his venue to Lincoln's Inn Fields, and then Essex Street; at its peak, his ensemble consisted of nearly 50 musicians.) his popularity rapidly inaugurated the prominence of public concerts in London. The conception of "classical", or more often "ancient music", emerged, which was still built on the principles of formality and excellence, and according to Heartz "civic ritual, religion and moral activism figured significantly in this novel construction of musical taste". The performance of such music was specialized by the Academy of Ancient Music and later at the Concerts of Antient Music series, where the work of select 16th- and 17th-century composers was featured, especially George Frideric Handel. (Note: For further information on the development of a classical music canon in 18th-century England, see Weber, William (Autumn 1994). "The Intellectual Origins of Musical Canon in Eighteenth-Century England". Journal of the American Musicological Society. 47 (3): 488–520. doi:10.2307/3128800. JSTOR 3128800.) In France, the reign of Louis XIV (r. 1638–1715) saw a cultural renaissance, by the end of which writers such as Molière, Jean de La Fontaine and Jean Racine were considered to have surpassed the achievements of classical antiquity. They were thus characterized as "classical", as was the music of Jean-Baptiste Lully (and later Christoph Willibald Gluck), being designated as "l'opéra française classique". In the rest of continental Europe, the abandonment of defining "classical" as analogous to the Greco-Roman World was slower, primarily because the formation of canonical repertoires was either minimal or exclusive to the upper classes.

Many European commentators of the early 19th century found new unification in their definition of classical music: to juxtapose the older composers Wolfgang Amadeus Mozart, Joseph Haydn, and (excluding some of his later works) Ludwig van Beethoven as "classical" against the emerging style of Romantic music. These three composers in particular were grouped into the First Viennese School, sometimes called the "Viennese classics", (Note: Some critics, from the 19th to 21st centuries, defined the First Viennese School in different ways. Commentators such as Johann Wolfgang von Goethe and later Ludwig Finscher excluded Beethoven from the school entirely, while the musicologist Friedrich Blume included all three in addition to Franz Schubert. Charles Rosen included Haydn, Mozart and Beethoven, but only their instrumental music.) a coupling that remains problematic by reason of none of the three being born in Vienna and the minimal time Haydn and Mozart spent in the city. While this was an often expressed characterization, it was not a strict one. In 1879 the composer Charles Kensington Salaman defined the following composers as classical: Bach, Handel, Haydn, Mozart, Beethoven, Weber, Spohr and Mendelssohn. More broadly, some writers used the term "classical" to generally praise well-regarded outputs from various composers, particularly those who produced many works in an established genre. (Note: The earliest use of the term "classical music" in English literature given by the Oxford English Dictionary (OED) is in the 1829 diary of English musician Vincent Novello, who said "This is the place I should come to every Sunday when I wished to hear classical music correctly and judiciously performed". However, this is predated by at least 9 years from the title of the English writer John Feltham Danneley's 1820 Introduction to the Elementary Principles of Thorough Bass and Classical Music.)

=== Contemporary understanding ===
The contemporary understanding of the term "classical music" remains vague and multifaceted. Other terms such as "art music", "canonic music", "cultivated music" and "serious music" are largely synonymous. The term "classical music" is often indicated or implied to concern solely the Western world, and conversely, in many academic histories the term "Western music" excludes non-classical Western music. (Note: In addition to the title of Taruskin 2005, see also the titles of Grout 1973, Hanning 2002 and Stolba 1998, all of which include the term "Western music" but essentially exclude non-classical music in the Western world. Grout 1973 was first published in 1960, and it was not until the fifth edition prepared by Claude V. Palisca in 1996 that any information on jazz and popular music was included.) Another complication lies in that "classical music" is sometimes used to describe non-Western art music exhibiting similar long-lasting and complex characteristics; examples include Indian classical music, Gamelan music, and various styles of the court of Imperial China (see yayue for instance). Thus in the later 20th century terms such as "Western classical music" and "Western art music" came in use to address this. The musicologist Ralph P. Locke notes that neither term is ideal, as they create an "intriguing complication" when considering "certain practitioners of Western-art music genres who come from non-Western cultures". (Note: The musicologist Ralph P. Locke cites composer Tan Dun as an example, and notes the title of a 2004 publication, Locating East Asia in Western Art Music. See also the title of Barone, Joshua (23 July 2021). "Asian Composers Reflect on Careers in Western Classical Music". The New York Times. Archived from the original on 28 December 2021. Burkholder, Grout & Palisca 2014, p. 1009 note that "We may well wonder whether the term "Western [classical] music" is still appropriate when Western culture has spread around the world, and some of the most practices performers and interesting new composers come from China, Japan and Korea. Given its global reach, it may be time to rename this tradition, but as eclectic and diverse as it has become, its roots are still in Western culture reaching back through Europe to ancient Greece".)

Complexity in musical form and harmonic organization are typical traits of classical music. The Oxford English Dictionary (OED) offers three definitions for the word "classical" in relation to music:

1. "of acknowledged excellence"
2. "of, relating to, or characteristic of a formal musical tradition, as distinguished from popular or folk music"
3. and more specifically, "of or relating to formal European music of the late 18th and early 19th centuries, characterized by harmony, balance, and adherence to established compositional forms".

The last definition concerns what is now termed the Classical period, a specific stylistic era of European music from the second half of the 18th century to the beginning of the 19th century.

== History ==
=== Roots ===
The Western classical tradition formally begins with music created by and for the early Christian Church. It is probable that the early Church wished to disassociate itself from the predominant music of ancient Greece and Rome, as it was a reminder of the pagan religion it had persecuted and by which it had been persecuted. As such, it remains unclear as to what extent the music of the Christian Church, and thus Western classical music as a whole, was influenced by preceding ancient music.

The general attitude towards music was adopted from the Ancient Greek and Roman music theorists and commentators. (Note: From all available evidence, it appears that no, or few, significant musical developments can be credited to Ancient Rome, who largely adopted the practices of their Ancient Greek predecessors.) Just as in Greco-Roman society, music was considered central to education; along with arithmetic, geometry and astronomy, music was included in the quadrivium, the four subjects of the upper division of a standard liberal arts education in the Middle Ages. This high regard for music was first promoted by the scholars Cassiodorus, Isidore of Seville, and particularly Boethius, whose transmission and expansion on the perspectives of music from Pythagoras, Aristotle and Plato were crucial in the development of medieval musical thought.

However, scholars, medieval music theorists and composers regularly misinterpreted or misunderstood the writings of their Greek and Roman predecessors. This was due to the complete absence of surviving Greco-Roman musical works available to medieval musicians, (Note: Musicologist Donald Jay Grout notes that even by the 20th century there were only fragments and a few more sizable examples of such Greco-Roman music that survive.) to the extent that Isidore of Seville (c. 559 – 636) stated "unless sounds are remembered by man, they perish, for they cannot be written down", unaware of the systematic notational practices of Ancient Greece centuries before. (Note: The entirety of early medieval Europe may not have been without a notional system for music, see Gampel 2012, who argues against the traditional conclusion of Isidore of Seville's remark.) The musicologist Gustave Reese notes, however, that many Greco-Roman texts can still be credited as influential to Western classical music, since medieval musicians regularly read their works—regardless of whether they were doing so correctly.

However, there are some indisputable musical continuations from the ancient world. Basic aspects such as monophony, improvisation and the dominance of text in musical settings are prominent in both early medieval and music of nearly all ancient civilizations. Greek influences in particular include the church modes (which were descendants of developments by Aristoxenus and Pythagoras), basic acoustical theory from pythagorean tuning, as well as the central function of tetrachords. Ancient Greek instruments such as the aulos (a reed instrument) and the lyre (a stringed instrument similar to a small harp) eventually led to several modern-day instruments of a symphonic orchestra. However, Donald Jay Grout notes that attempting to create a direct evolutionary connection from the ancient music to early medieval is baseless, as it was almost solely influenced by Greco-Roman music theory, not performance or practice.

=== Early music ===
==== Medieval ====
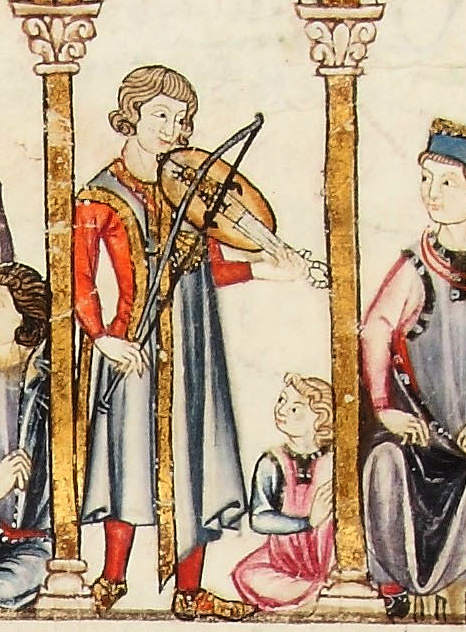
Musician playing the vielle (14th-century Medieval manuscript)

"Breves dies hominis"
"Breves dies hominis" by either Léonin or Pérotin, performed by Wikimedian Makemi.

Medieval music includes Western European music from after the fall of the Western Roman Empire by 476 to about 1400. Monophonic chant, also called plainsong or Gregorian chant, was the dominant form until about 1100. Christian monks developed the first forms of European musical notation in order to standardize liturgy throughout the Church. Polyphonic (multi-voiced) music developed from monophonic chant throughout the late Middle Ages and into the Renaissance, including the more complex voicings of motets. During the earlier medieval period, the vocal music from the liturgical genre, predominantly Gregorian chant, was monophonic, using a single, unaccompanied vocal melody line. Polyphonic vocal genres, which used multiple independent vocal melodies, began to develop during the high medieval era, becoming prevalent by the later 13th and early 14th century. Notable medieval composers include Hildegard of Bingen, Léonin, Pérotin, Philippe de Vitry, Guillaume de Machaut, Francesco Landini, and Johannes Ciconia.

Many medieval musical instruments still exist, but in different forms. Medieval instruments included the flute, the recorder and plucked string instruments like the lute. As well, early versions of the organ and fiddle (or vielle) existed. Medieval instruments in Europe had most commonly been used singly, often self-accompanied with a drone note, or occasionally in parts. From at least as early as the 13th century through the 15th century, there was a division of instruments into haut (loud, shrill, outdoor instruments) and bas (quieter, more intimate instruments). A number of instruments have roots in Eastern predecessors that were adopted from the medieval Islamic world. For example, the Arabic rebab is the ancestor of all European bowed string instruments, including the lira, rebec and violin.

==== Renaissance ====
The musical Renaissance era lasted from 1400 to 1600. It was characterized by greater use of instrumentation, multiple interweaving melodic lines, and the use of earlier forms of bass instruments. Social dancing became more widespread, so musical forms appropriate to accompanying dance began to standardize. It is in this time that the notation of music on a staff and other elements of musical notation began to take shape. This invention made possible the separation of the composition of a piece of music from its transmission; without written music, transmission was oral, and subject to change every time it was transmitted. With a musical score, a work of music could be performed without the composer's presence. The invention of the movable-type printing press in the 15th century had far-reaching consequences for the preservation and transmission of music.

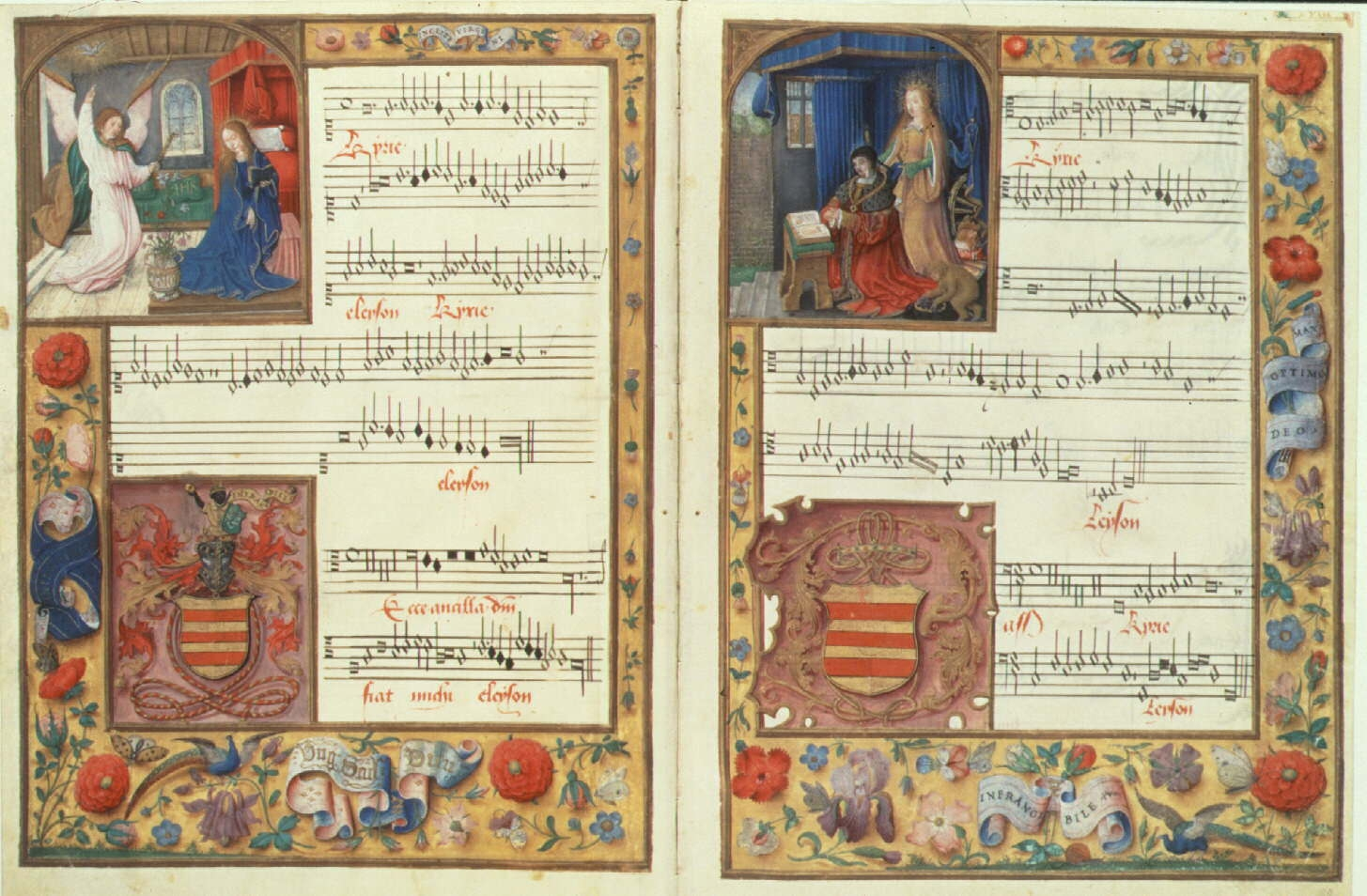
An illuminated opening from the Chigi codex featuring the Kyrie of Ockeghem's Missa Ecce ancilla Domini

Loquebantur variis linguis
Thomas Tallis's motet Loquebantur variis linguis, performed by The Tudor Consort

Fantasia 'Di Sei Bassi'
Alfonso Ferrabosco the elder's Fantasia 'Di Sei Bassi', performed by Phillip W. Serna

Many instruments originated during the Renaissance; others were variations of, or improvements upon, instruments that had existed previously. Some have survived to the present day; others have disappeared, only to be re-created in order to perform music on period instruments. As in the modern day, instruments may be classified as brass, strings, percussion, and woodwind. Brass instruments in the Renaissance were traditionally played by professionals who were members of Guilds and they included the slide trumpet, the wooden cornet, the valveless trumpet and the sackbut. Stringed instruments included the viol, the rebec, the harp-like lyre, the hurdy-gurdy, the lute, the guitar, the cittern, the bandora, and the orpharion. Keyboard instruments with strings included the harpsichord and the clavichord. Percussion instruments include the triangle, the Jew's harp, the tambourine, the bells, the rumble-pot, and various kinds of drums. Woodwind instruments included the double-reed shawm (an early member of the oboe family), the reed pipe, the bagpipe, the transverse flute, the recorder, the dulcian, and the crumhorn. Simple pipe organs existed, but were largely confined to churches, although there were portable varieties. Printing enabled the standardization of descriptions and specifications of instruments, as well as instruction in their use.

Vocal music in the Renaissance is noted for the flourishing of an increasingly elaborate polyphonic style. The principal liturgical forms which endured throughout the entire Renaissance period were masses and motets, with some other developments towards the end, especially as composers of sacred music began to adopt secular forms (such as the madrigal) for their own designs. Towards the end of the period, the early dramatic precursors of opera such as monody, the madrigal comedy, and the intermedio are seen. Around 1597, Italian composer Jacopo Peri wrote Dafne, the first work to be called an opera today. He also composed Euridice, the first opera to have survived to the present day.

Notable composers of the Renaissance include Josquin des Prez, Giovanni Pierluigi da Palestrina, John Dunstaple, Johannes Ockeghem, Orlande de Lassus, Guillaume Du Fay, Gilles Binchois, Thomas Tallis, William Byrd, Giovanni Gabrieli, Carlo Gesualdo, John Dowland, Jacob Obrecht, Adrian Willaert, Jacques Arcadelt, Cipriano de Rore, and Francesco da Milano.

=== Common-practice period ===
The common practice period is typically defined as the era between the formation and the dissolution of common-practice tonality. The term usually spans roughly two-and-a-half centuries, encompassing the Baroque, Classical, and Romantic periods.

==== Baroque ====
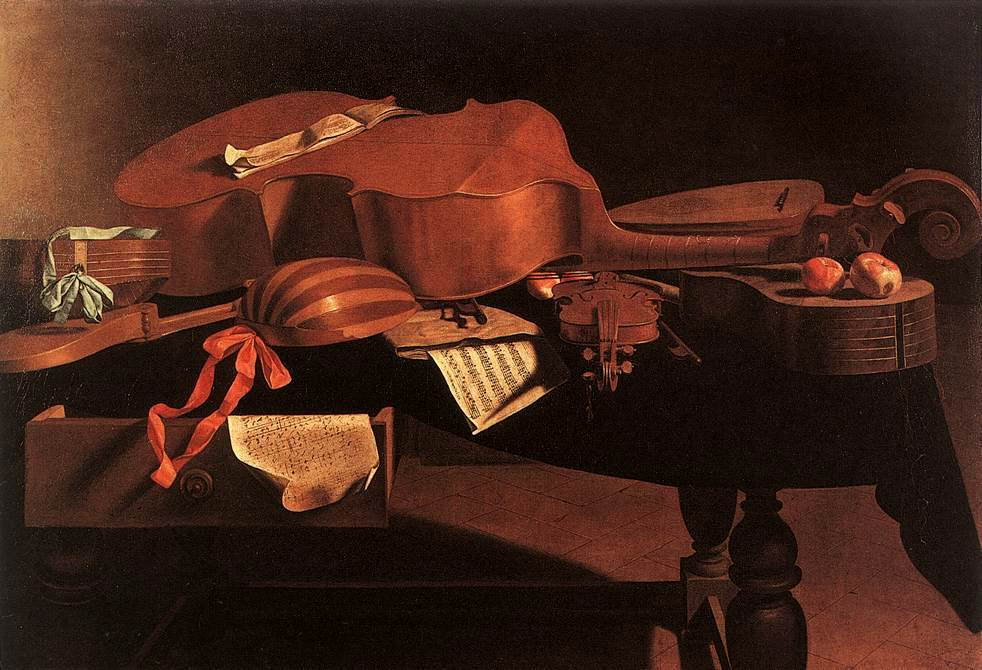
Baroque instruments including hurdy-gurdy, harpsichord, bass viol, lute, violin, and baroque guitar

The Well-Tempered Clavier, Book I: Prelude in C major
Johann Sebastian Bach's The Well-Tempered Clavier, Book I: Prelude in C major (BWV 846)

Concert Suite in D major, 6th movement: Courante
Georg Philipp Telemann's Concert Suite in D major, TWV 55:D6, 6th movement: Courante, performed by the Advent Chamber Orchestra

The Four Seasons, Concerto No. 1 in E major, "Spring", 1st movement: Allegro
Antonio Vivaldi's The Four Seasons, Concerto No. 1 in E major, "Spring", 1st movement: Allegro

Baroque music is characterized by the use of complex tonal counterpoint and the use of a basso continuo, a continuous bass line. Music became more complex in comparison with the simple songs of all previous periods. The beginnings of the sonata form took shape in the canzona, as did a more formalized notion of theme and variations. The tonalities of major and minor as means for managing dissonance and chromaticism in music took full shape.

During the Baroque era, keyboard music played on the harpsichord and pipe organ became increasingly popular, and the violin family of stringed instruments took the form generally seen today. Opera as a staged musical drama began to differentiate itself from earlier musical and dramatic forms, and vocal forms like the cantata and oratorio became more common. For the first time, vocalists began adding ornamentals to the music.

The theories surrounding equal temperament began to be put in wider practice, as it enabled a wider range of chromatic possibilities in hard-to-tune keyboard instruments. Although J.S. Bach did not use equal temperament, changes in the temperaments from the then-common meantone system to various temperaments that made modulation between all keys musically acceptable made possible his Well-Tempered Clavier.

Baroque instruments included some instruments from the earlier periods (e.g., the hurdy-gurdy and recorder) and a number of new instruments (e.g., the oboe, bassoon, cello, contrabass and fortepiano). Some instruments from previous eras fell into disuse, such as the shawm, cittern, rackett, and the wooden cornet. The key Baroque instruments for strings included the violin, viol, viola, viola d'amore, cello, contrabass, lute, theorbo (which often played the basso continuo parts), mandolin, Baroque guitar, harp and hurdy-gurdy. Woodwinds included the Baroque flute, Baroque oboe, recorder and the bassoon. Brass instruments included the cornett, natural horn, natural trumpet, serpent and the trombone. Keyboard instruments included the clavichord, the tangent piano, the harpsichord, the pipe organ, and, later in the period, the fortepiano (an early version of the piano). Percussion instruments included the timpani, snare drum, tambourine and the castanets.

One major difference between Baroque music and the classical era that followed it is that the types of instruments used in Baroque ensembles were much less standardized. A Baroque ensemble could include one of several different types of keyboard instruments (e.g., pipe organ or harpsichord), additional stringed chordal instruments (e.g., a lute), bowed strings, woodwinds, and brass instruments, and an unspecified number of bass instruments performing the basso continuo,(e.g., a cello, contrabass, viola, bassoon, serpent, etc.).

Vocal oeuvres of the Baroque era included suites such as oratorios and cantatas. Secular music was less common, and was typically characterized only by instrumental music. Like Baroque art, themes were generally sacred and for the purpose of a catholic setting.

Notable composers of the Baroque era include Johann Sebastian Bach, Antonio Vivaldi, George Frideric Handel, Johann Pachelbel, Henry Purcell, Claudio Monteverdi, Barbara Strozzi, Domenico Scarlatti, Georg Philipp Telemann, Arcangelo Corelli, Alessandro Scarlatti, Jean-Philippe Rameau, Jean-Baptiste Lully, and Heinrich Schütz.

==== Classical ====
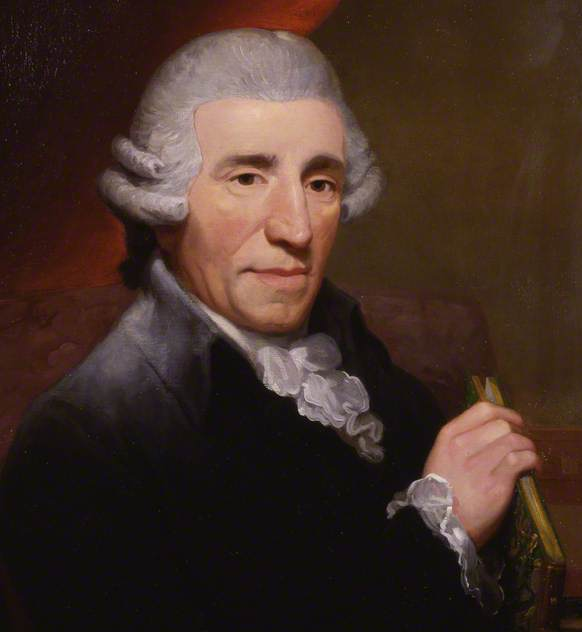
Joseph Haydn (1732–1809), portrayed by Thomas Hardy (1791)

Der Vogelfänger bin ich ja
Wolfgang Amadeus Mozart's The Magic Flute, aria "Der Vogelfänger bin ich ja" sung by Papageno, performed by the RIAS Symphonie-Orchester, conducted by Ferenc Fricsay

Kyrie
Joseph Haydn's Missa in angustiis ("Nelson Mass"), Kyrie

Piano Sonata No. 1 in F minor, 1st movement: Allegro
Ludwig van Beethoven's Piano Sonata No. 1 in F minor, Op. 2 No. 1, 1st movement: Allegro, performed by Artur Schnabel

Though the term "classical music" includes all Western art music from the medieval era to the 21st century, the Classical era is the period of Western art music from the 1750s to the early 1820s—the era of Wolfgang Amadeus Mozart, Joseph Haydn, and Ludwig van Beethoven.

The Classical era established many of the norms of composition, presentation, and style, and when the piano became the predominant keyboard instrument. The basic forces required for an orchestra became somewhat standardized (though they would grow as the potential of a wider array of instruments was developed). Chamber music grew to include ensembles with as many as 8–10 performers for serenades. Opera continued to develop, with regional styles in Italy, France, and German-speaking lands. The opera buffa, a form of comic opera, rose in popularity. The symphony came into its own as a musical form, and the concerto was developed as a vehicle for displays of virtuoso playing skill. Orchestras no longer required a harpsichord, and were often led by the lead violinist (now called the concertmaster).

Classical era musicians continued to use many of the instruments from the Baroque era, such as the cello, contrabass, recorder, trombone, timpani, fortepiano (the precursor to the modern piano) and organ. While some Baroque instruments fell into disuse e.g. the theorbo and rackett, many Baroque instruments were changed into the versions still in use today, such as the Baroque violin (which became the violin), Baroque oboe (which became the oboe) and Baroque trumpet, which transitioned to the regular valved trumpet. During the Classical era, the stringed instruments used in orchestra and chamber music such as string quartets were standardized as the four instruments which form the string section of the orchestra: the violin, viola, cello, and double bass. Baroque-era stringed instruments such as fretted, bowed viols were phased out. Woodwinds included the basset clarinet, basset horn, clarinette d'amour, the Classical clarinet, the chalumeau, the flute, oboe and bassoon. Keyboard instruments included the clavichord and the fortepiano. While the harpsichord was still used in basso continuo accompaniment in the 1750s and 1760s, it fell out of use at the end of the century. Brass instruments included the buccin, the ophicleide (a replacement for the bass serpent, which was the precursor of the tuba) and the natural horn.

Wind instruments became more refined in the Classical era. While double-reed instruments like the oboe and bassoon became somewhat standardized in the Baroque, the clarinet family of single reeds was not widely used until Mozart expanded its role in orchestral, chamber, and concerto settings.

Notable composers of the Classical era include Wolfgang Amadeus Mozart, Joseph Haydn, Franz Schubert, Carl Philipp Emanuel Bach, Luigi Boccherini, Antonio Salieri, Carl Czerny, and Pierre Rode. Ludwig van Beethoven is commonly regarded as a transitional composer whose music combines both late Classical and early Romantic elements.

==== Romantic ====
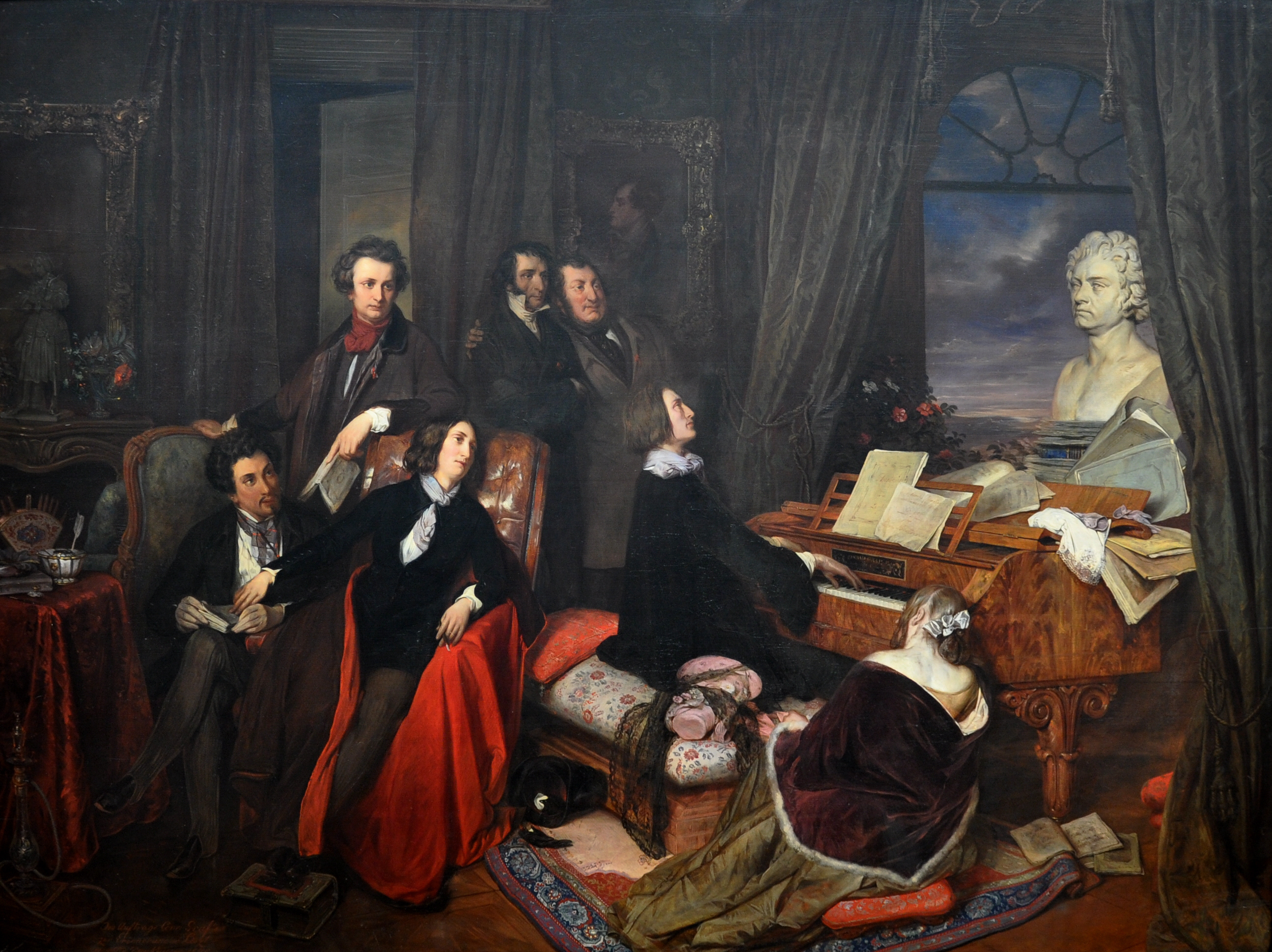
Josef Danhauser's 1840 painting Liszt at the Piano featuring Franz Liszt at the piano surrounded by (from left to right) Alexandre Dumas, Hector Berlioz, George Sand, Niccolò Paganini, Gioachino Rossini, and Marie d'Agoult with a bust of Ludwig van Beethoven on the piano

Symphony No. 5 in C minor, 1st movement: Allegro con brio
Ludwig van Beethoven's Symphony No. 5 in C minor, Op. 67, 1st movement: Allegro con brio, performed by Fulda Symphonic Orchestra, conducted by Simon Schindler

"The Blue Danube"
Johann Strauss II's "The Blue Danube", Op. 314, performed by the U.S. Marine Band, conducted by Albert F. Schoepper

Dance of the Sugar Plum Fairy
Pyotr Ilyich Tchaikovsky's The Nutcracker, excerpt "Dance of the Sugar Plum Fairy", performed by Kevin MacLeod

"Ride of the Valkyries"
Richard Wagner's Die Walküre, Act III, "Ride of the Valkyries", conducted by Philip Milman

The music of the Romantic era, from roughly the first decade of the 19th century to the early 20th century, was characterized by increased attention to an extended melodic line, as well as expressive and emotional elements, paralleling romanticism in other art forms. Musical forms began to break from the Classical era forms (even as those were being codified), with free-form pieces like nocturnes, fantasias, and preludes being written where accepted ideas about the exposition and development of themes were ignored or minimized. The music became more chromatic, dissonant, and tonally colorful, with tensions (with respect to accepted norms of the older forms) about key signatures increasing. The art song (or Lied) came to maturity in this era, as did the epic scales of grand opera, ultimately transcended by Richard Wagner's Ring cycle.

In the 19th century, musical institutions emerged from the control of wealthy patrons, as composers and musicians could construct lives independent of the nobility. Increasing interest in music by the growing middle classes throughout western Europe spurred the creation of organizations for the teaching, performance, and preservation of music. The piano, which achieved its modern construction in this era (in part due to industrial advances in metallurgy) became widely popular with the middle class, whose demands for the instrument spurred many piano builders. Many symphony orchestras date their founding to this era. Some musicians and composers were the stars of the day; some, like Franz Liszt and Niccolò Paganini, fulfilled both roles.

European cultural ideas and institutions began to follow colonial expansion into other parts of the world. There was also a rise, especially toward the end of the era, of nationalism in music (echoing, in some cases, political sentiments of the time), as composers such as Edvard Grieg, Nikolai Rimsky-Korsakov, and Antonín Dvořák echoed traditional music of their homelands in their compositions.

In the Romantic era, the modern piano, with a more powerful, sustained tone and a wider range took over from the more delicate-sounding fortepiano. In the orchestra, the existing Classical instruments and sections were retained (string section, woodwinds, brass, and percussion), but these sections were typically expanded to make a fuller, bigger sound. For example, while a Baroque orchestra may have had two double bass players, a Romantic orchestra could have as many as ten. "As music grew more expressive, the standard orchestral palette just wasn't rich enough for many Romantic composers."

The families of instruments used, especially in orchestras, grew larger; a process that climaxed in the early 20th century with very large orchestras used by late romantic and modernist composers. A wider array of percussion instruments began to appear. Brass instruments took on larger roles, as the introduction of rotary valves made it possible for them to play a wider range of notes. The size of the orchestra (typically around 40 in the Classical era) grew to be over 100. Gustav Mahler's 1906 Symphony No. 8, for example, has been performed with over 150 instrumentalists and choirs of over 400. New woodwind instruments were added, such as the contrabassoon, bass clarinet and piccolo and new percussion instruments were added, including xylophones, snare drums, celestas (a bell-like keyboard instrument), bells, and triangles, large orchestral harps, and even wind machines for sound effects. Saxophones appear in some scores from the late 19th century onwards, usually featured as a solo instrument rather than as an integral part of the orchestra.

The Wagner tuba, a modified member of the horn family, appears in Richard Wagner's cycle Der Ring des Nibelungen. It also has a prominent role in Anton Bruckner's Symphony No. 7 in E Major and is also used in several late romantic and modernist works by Richard Strauss, Béla Bartók, and others. Cornets appear regularly in 19th century scores, alongside trumpets which were regarded as less agile, at least until the end of the century.

Notable composers of the Romantic era include Ludwig van Beethoven, Pyotr Ilyich Tchaikovsky, Frédéric Chopin, Hector Berlioz, Franz Schubert, Robert Schumann, Clara Schumann, Felix Mendelssohn, Fanny Hensel, Franz Liszt, Giuseppe Verdi, Richard Wagner, Johannes Brahms, Alexander Scriabin, Nikolai Medtner, Edvard Grieg, and Johann Strauss II. Gustav Mahler and Richard Strauss are commonly regarded as transitional composers whose music combines both late Romantic and early modernist elements.

=== 20th and 21st centuries ===
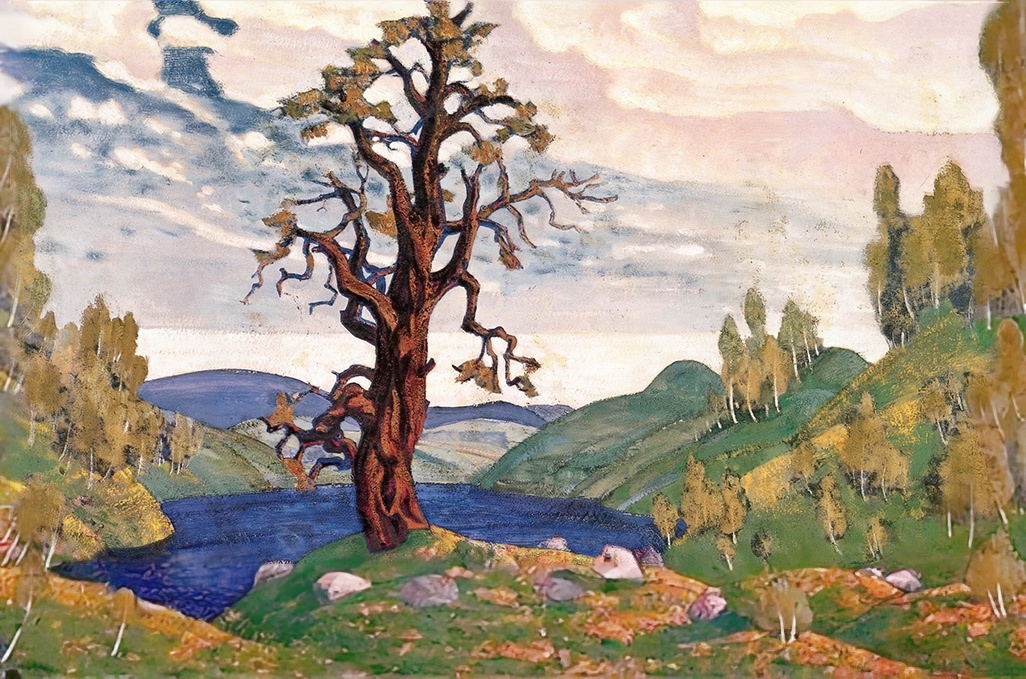
Concept art for the 1913 production of Stravinsky's The Rite of Spring. Many early 20th century composers such as Mahler, Sibelius and Vaughan Williams were heavily influenced by the forces of nature.

At the turn of the century, music was characteristically late romantic in style with its expressive melodies, complex harmonies, and expansive forms. This era was marked by the works of several composers who pushed forward post-romantic symphonic writing. Composers such as Gustav Mahler and Richard Strauss continued to develop the western classical tradition with expansive symphonies and operas, while the likes of Jean Sibelius and Vaughan Williams infused their compositions with nationalistic elements and influences from folk songs. Sergei Prokofiev began in this tradition but soon ventured into modernist territories. At the same time, the impressionist movement, spearheaded by Claude Debussy, was being developed in France, with Maurice Ravel as another notable pioneer.

==== Modernist ====
Boléro
Maurice Ravel's Boléro, performed by the Paris Orchestra, conducted by Charles Munch

Clair de lune
Claude Debussy's Clair de lune, 3rd movement of Suite bergamasque, performed by Laurens Goedhart

Rhapsody in Blue
George Gershwin's Rhapsody in Blue, performed by the U.S. Marine Band

Modernist classical music encompasses many styles of composition that can be characterised as post romantic, impressionist, expressionist, and neoclassical. Modernism marked an era when many composers rejected certain values of the common practice period, such as traditional tonality, melody, instrumentation, and structure. Some music historians regard musical modernism as an era extending from about 1890 to 1930. Others consider that modernism ended with one or the other of the two world wars. Still other authorities claim that modernism is not associated with any historical era, but rather is "an attitude of the composer; a living construct that can evolve with the times". Despite its decline in the last third of the 20th century, there remained at the end of the century an active core of composers who continued to advance the ideas and forms of modernism, such as Pierre Boulez, Pauline Oliveros, Toru Takemitsu, George Benjamin, Jacob Druckman, Brian Ferneyhough, George Perle, Wolfgang Rihm, Richard Wernick, Richard Wilson, and Ralph Shapey.

Two musical movements that were dominant during this time were the impressionist beginning around 1890 and the expressionist that started around 1908. It was a period of diverse reactions in challenging and reinterpreting older categories of music, innovations that lead to new ways of organizing and approaching harmonic, melodic, sonic, and rhythmic aspects of music, and changes in aesthetic worldviews in close relation to the larger identifiable period of modernism in the arts of the time. The operative word most associated with it is "innovation". Its leading feature is a "linguistic plurality", which is to say that no single music genre ever assumed a dominant position.

The orchestra continued to grow during the early years modernist era, peaking in the first two decades of the 20th century. Saxophones that appeared only rarely during the 19th century became more commonly used as supplementary instruments, but never became core members of the orchestra. While appearing only as featured solo instruments in some works, for example Maurice Ravel's orchestration of Modest Mussorgsky's Pictures at an Exhibition and Sergei Rachmaninoff's Symphonic Dances, the saxophone is included in other works such as Sergei Prokofiev's Romeo and Juliet Suites 1 and 2 and many other works as a member of the orchestral ensemble. In some compositions such as Ravel's Boléro, two or more saxophones of different sizes are used to create an entire section like the other sections of the orchestra. The euphonium is featured in a few late Romantic and 20th century works, usually playing parts marked "tenor tuba", including Gustav Holst's The Planets, and Richard Strauss's Ein Heldenleben.

Similarly, in the 20th century, both the accordion and its cousin the Free Bass Accordion were occasionally scored as a respected "legitimate instrument" within compositions of classical music for the symphonic orchestra and the chamber music ensemble. Significant works for the accordion included: Paul Creston's Concerto for Accordion and Orchestra, Op. 75, Robert Davine's Divertimento for Flute, Clarinet,Bassoon and Accordion, Anthony Galla-Rini's Accordion Concerto in G minor No. 1 and John Serry's Concerto for Free Bass Accordion.

Prominent composers of the early 20th century include Igor Stravinsky, Claude Debussy, Sergei Rachmaninoff, Sergei Prokofiev, Arnold Schoenberg, Nikos Skalkottas, Heitor Villa-Lobos, Karol Szymanowski, Anton Webern, Alban Berg, Cécile Chaminade, Paul Hindemith, Aram Khachaturian, George Gershwin, Amy Beach, Béla Bartók, and Dmitri Shostakovich, along with the aforementioned Mahler and Strauss as transitional figures who carried over from the 19th century.

==== Post-modern/contemporary ====
Postmodern music is a period of music that began as early as 1930 according to some authorities. It shares characteristics with postmodernist art – that is, art that comes after and reacts against modernism.

Some other authorities have more or less equated postmodern music with the "contemporary music" composed well after 1930, from the late 20th century through to the early 21st century. Some of the diverse movements of the postmodern/contemporary era include the neoromantic, neomedieval, minimalist, and post minimalist.

Contemporary classical music at the beginning of the 21st century was often considered to include all post-1945 musical forms. A generation later, this term now properly refers to the music of today written by composers who are still alive; music that came into prominence in the mid-1970s. It includes different variations of modernist, postmodern, neoromantic, and pluralist music.

== Performance ==
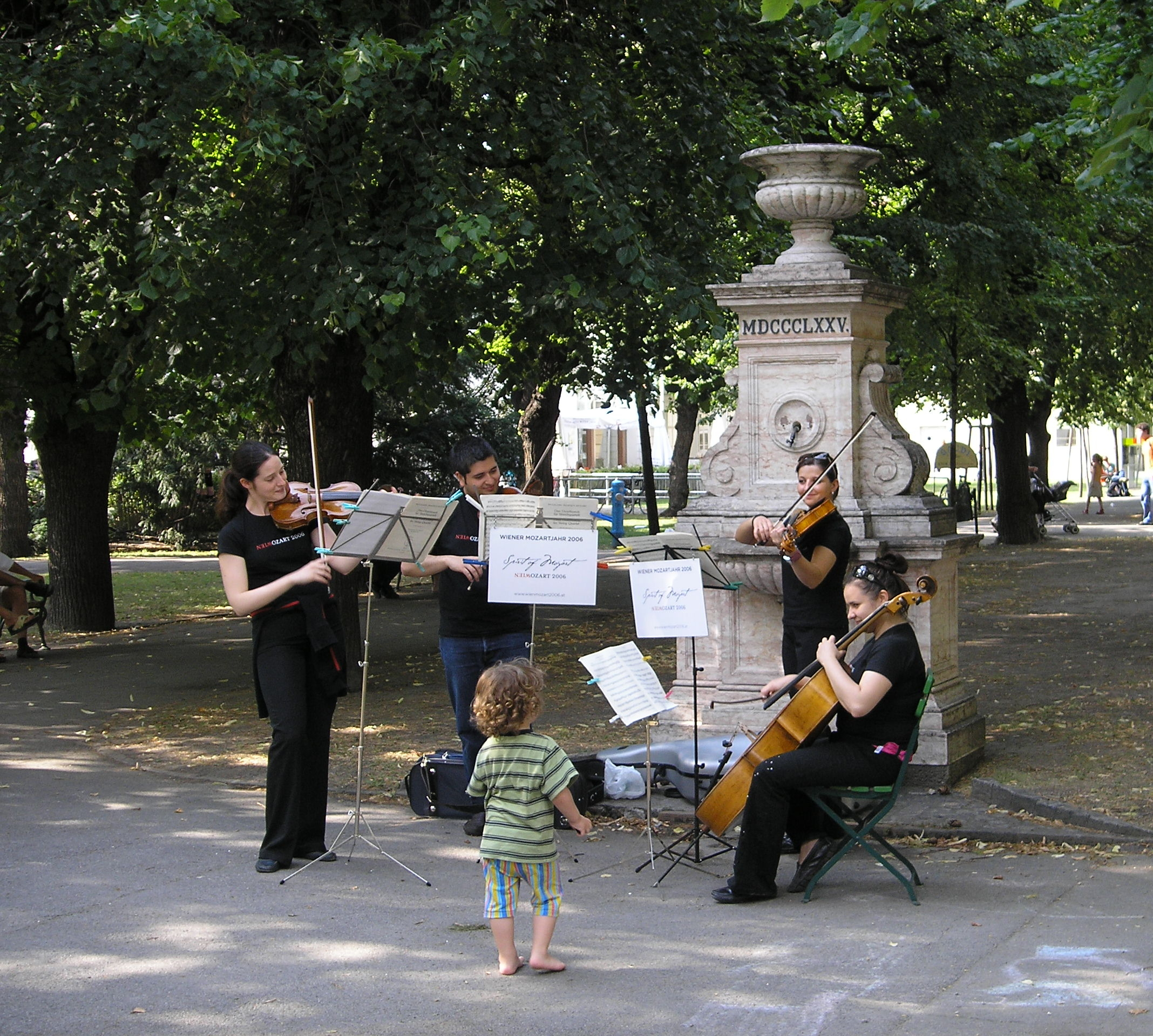
A string quartet performing for the Mozart Year 2006 in Vienna

Performers who have studied classical music extensively are said to be "classically trained". This training may come from private lessons from instrument or voice teachers or from completion of a formal program offered by a Conservatory, college or university, such as a Bachelor of Music or Master of Music degree (which includes individual lessons from professors). In classical music, "...extensive formal music education and training, often to postgraduate [Master's degree] level" is required.

Performance of classical music repertoire requires a proficiency in sight-reading and ensemble playing, harmonic principles, strong ear training (to correct and adjust pitches by ear), knowledge of performance practice (e.g., Baroque ornamentation), and a familiarity with the style/musical idiom expected for a given composer or musical work (e.g., a Brahms symphony or a Mozart concerto).

The key characteristic of European classical music that distinguishes it from popular music, folk music, and some other classical music traditions such as Indian classical music, is that the repertoire tends to be written down in musical notation, creating a musical part or score. This score typically determines details of rhythm, pitch, and, where two or more musicians (whether singers or instrumentalists) are involved, how the various parts are coordinated. The written quality of the music has enabled a high level of complexity within them: fugues, for instance, achieve a remarkable marriage of boldly distinctive melodic lines weaving in counterpoint yet creating a coherent harmonic logic. The use of written notation also preserves a record of the works and enables Classical musicians to perform music from many centuries ago.

Although classical music in the 2000s has lost most of its tradition for musical improvisation, from the Baroque era to the Romantic era, there are examples of performers who could improvise in the style of their era. In the Baroque era, organ performers would improvise preludes, keyboard performers playing harpsichord would improvise chords from the figured bass symbols beneath the bass notes of the basso continuo part and both vocal and instrumental performers would improvise musical ornaments. Johann Sebastian Bach was particularly noted for his complex improvisations. During the Classical era, the composer-performer Wolfgang Amadeus Mozart was noted for his ability to improvise melodies in different styles. During the Classical era, some virtuoso soloists would improvise the cadenza sections of a concerto. During the Romantic era, Ludwig van Beethoven would improvise at the piano.

== Relationship to other music traditions ==
=== Popular music ===
Classical music has often incorporated elements or material from popular music of the composer's time. Examples include occasional music such as Brahms's use of student drinking songs in his Academic Festival Overture, genres exemplified by Kurt Weill's The Threepenny Opera, and the influence of jazz on early and mid-20th-century composers including Maurice Ravel, exemplified by the movement entitled "Blues" in his sonata for violin and piano. Some postmodern, minimalist and postminimalist classical composers acknowledge a debt to popular music.

George Gershwin's 1924 orchestral composition Rhapsody in Blue has been described as orchestral jazz or symphonic jazz. The composition combines elements of classical music with jazz-influenced effects.

Numerous examples show influence in the opposite direction, including popular songs based on classical music, the use to which Pachelbel's Canon has been put since the 1970s, and the musical crossover phenomenon, where classical musicians have achieved success in the popular music arena. In heavy metal, a number of lead guitarists (playing electric guitar), including Ritchie Blackmore and Randy Rhoads, modeled their playing styles on Baroque or Classical-era instrumental music.

=== Folk music ===
Composers of classical music have often made use of folk music (music created by musicians who are commonly not classically trained, often from a purely oral tradition). Some composers, like Dvořák and Smetana, have used folk themes to impart a nationalist flavor to their work, while others like Bartók have used specific themes lifted whole from their folk-music origins. Khachaturian widely incorporated into his work the folk music of his native Armenia, but also other ethnic groups of the Middle East and Eastern Europe.

== Commercialization ==
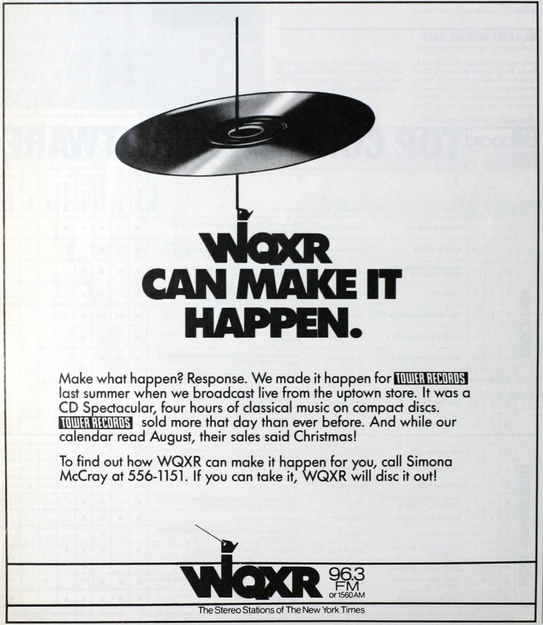
With the advent of radio broadcasting and record shops, live classical music performances have been compiled into compilation CDs (WQXR for Tower Records, 1986).

Certain staples of classical music are often used commercially (either in advertising or in movie soundtracks). In television commercials, several passages have become clichéd, particularly the opening of Richard Strauss' Also sprach Zarathustra (made famous in the film 2001: A Space Odyssey) and the opening section "O Fortuna" of Carl Orff's Carmina Burana; other examples include the "Dies irae" from the Verdi Requiem, Edvard Grieg's "In the Hall of the Mountain King" from Peer Gynt, the opening bars of Beethoven's Symphony No. 5, Aram Khachaturian's "Sabre Dance", Wagner's "Ride of the Valkyries" from Die Walküre, Rimsky-Korsakov's "Flight of the Bumblebee", and excerpts of Aaron Copland's Rodeo. Several works from the Golden Age of Animation matched the action to classical music. Notable examples are Walt Disney's Fantasia, Tom and Jerry's Johann Mouse, and Warner Bros.' Rabbit of Seville and What's Opera, Doc?

Similarly, movies and television often use standard, clichéd excerpts of classical music to convey refinement or opulence: some of the most-often heard pieces in this category include Bach's Cello Suite No. 1, Mozart's Eine kleine Nachtmusik, Vivaldi's Four Seasons, Mussorgsky's Night on Bald Mountain (as orchestrated by Rimsky-Korsakov), and Rossini's "William Tell Overture". Shawn Vancour argues the commercialization of classical music in the 1920s may have harmed the music industry.

== Education ==
During the 1990s, several research papers and popular books wrote on what came to be called the "Mozart effect": an observed temporary, small elevation of scores on spatial reasoning tests as a result of listening to Mozart's music. The approach has been popularized in a book by Don Campbell, and is based on an experiment published in Nature suggesting that listening to Mozart temporarily boosted students' IQ by 8 to 9 points. This popularized version of the theory was expressed succinctly by the New York Times music columnist Alex Ross: "researchers... have determined that listening to Mozart actually makes you smarter." Promoters marketed CDs claimed to induce the effect. Florida passed a law requiring toddlers in state-run schools to listen to classical music every day, and in 1998 the governor of Georgia budgeted $105,000 per year to provide every child born in Georgia with a tape or CD of classical music. One of the co-authors of the original studies of the Mozart effect commented "I don't think it can hurt. I'm all for exposing children to wonderful cultural experiences. But I do think the money could be better spent on music education programs."

== See also ==
- Classical music of the United Kingdom
- Classical music of the United States
- Italian classical music
- Russian classical music
- Women in classical music
