= Alexander Blair (writer) =

English writer & academic (1782–1878)

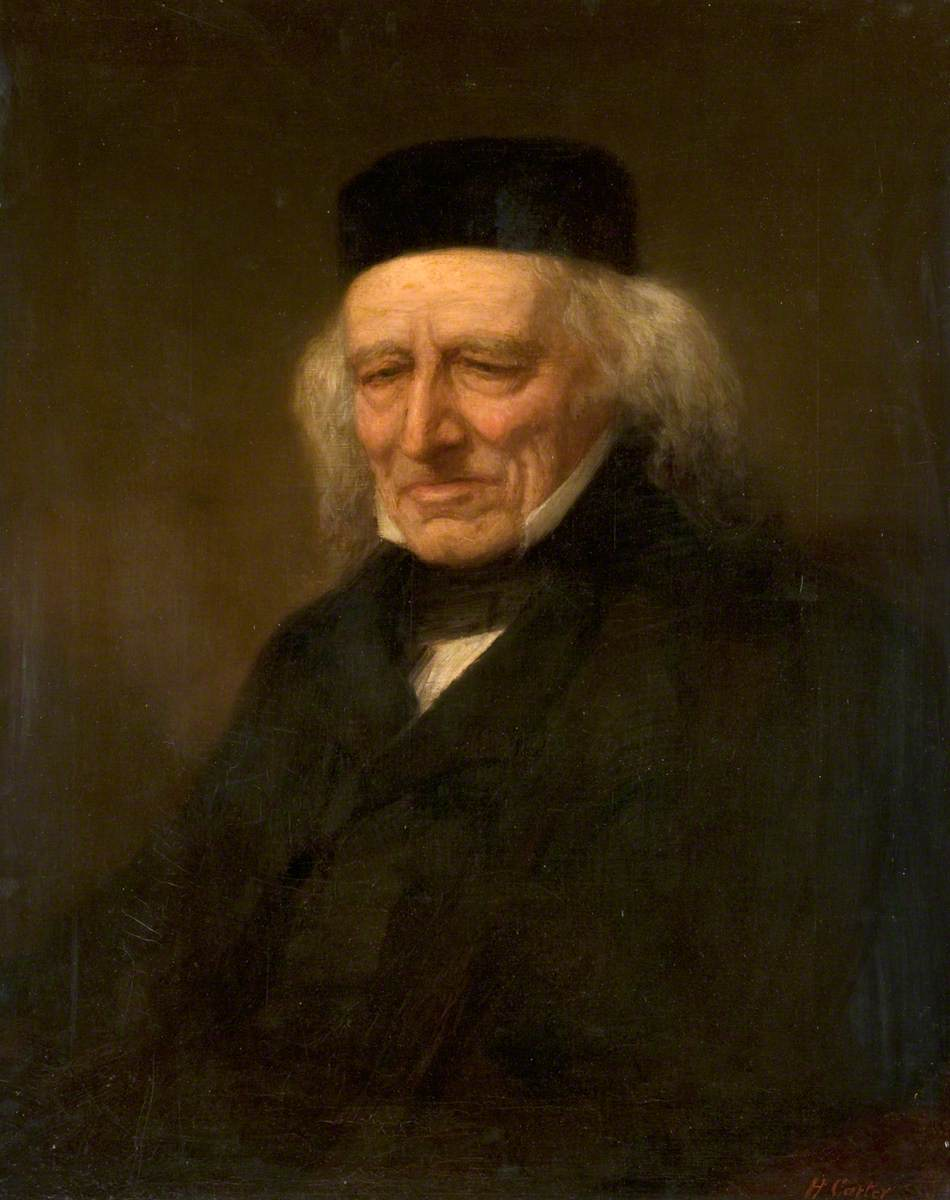
Alexander Blair, portrait by Hugh Carter

Alexander Blair (1782–1878) was an English writer and academic. Considered as an original thinker, he is also described as "disorganised, despondent and a ditherer". He is known as a friend of Christopher North.

== Background ==
He was the son of Alexander Blair (1737–c.1816), a manufacturer and merchant in the Birmingham area, and brother of the writer and historian Mary Margaret Busk. Their mother was Mary Johnson. The elder Alexander Blair was an army officer, who in 1780 went into partnership with James Keir at Tipton. They made alloy window sashes, and alkali, and the venture became a successful soap manufacturer. The business with Keir included a coal mine. Blair also set up a business making masts, and bought land in the Canadian Maritimes. In later life he encountered financial problems.

Blair became a proprietor of the Royal Institution. Socially, he knew James Boswell and Joseph Priestley, and was connected to the Lunar Society by his acquaintance. He was a Nonconformist, and in politics followed Charles James Fox. He had heard of Keir's work on alkalis from William Irvine, the Glasgow chemist.

Mary Johnson, wife of Alexander Blair the elder, was the daughter of Alexander Johnson of The Hague. Johnson was a military agent there, and involved in litigation around 1770, when James Boswell acted as his lawyer. Alexander Johnson was father to Richard Johnson (1753–1807), whose financial problems compounded those of the Blairs.

== Life ==
Alexander Blair, the younger, was born with a twin brother Richard. He was brought up in London and Birmingham, before being sent to boarding school. He attended Glasgow University, where he studied languages and philosophy. There he met John Wilson, a long-term friend.

Blair was a partner in the Tipton family business, with his father and Richard, the partnership being dissolved in 1815. From 1830 to 1836 he was Professor of English and Rhetoric at London University, successor to Thomas Dale who had first held the chair. As a man of letters he did not thrive in the philological atmosphere promoted by colleagues Thomas Hewitt Key and George Long, and resigned the post.

Blair was a friend of Thomas Wright Hill, and also of Samuel Carter, a Coventry lawyer and a younger man. Hugh Carter, son of Samuel, painted his portrait.

== Works ==
Blair wrote for Blackwood's Magazine. In 1824 he attacked the idea of the encyclopedia in Blackwood's, arguing that individual and specialised contributions were what advanced knowledge. He doubted whether the "circle of the sciences" could actually be grasped. Specialised encyclopedias were appearing at the period, such as the Encyclopaedia, or Dictionary of Music (1825) by John Feltham Danneley.

Sketches at Carnac (Brittany) in 1834 (1836) was illustrated by Francis Ronalds. It recorded an archaeological survey of the ancient Carnac stones. Following it, Blair suffered from depression, which played a part in his resignation from his chair.

A loyal supporter of John Wilson, who wrote as "Christopher North", Blair provided both material and encouragement to his friend.
