= Eccentric Club =

London gentlemen's club

- Founded: 1781; refounded 1858, 1890 and 2008
- Location: London, United Kingdom
- Members: Eccentrics and philanthropists
- Website: eccentricclub.co.uk

Eccentric Club is a name used by a series of gentlemen's clubs in London, the best-known of which existed between 1890 and 1986. For much of its history, that club was based at 9–11 Ryder Street in St James's. The club that currently uses this name was founded in 2008.

== First Eccentric Club ==
The first Eccentric Club had its roots in the Society of Eccentrics, which existed from 1781 to the 1820s. They were an offshoot of The Brilliants and were described as a convivial Club who met at a tavern in Chandos Street, Covent Garden. They were later renamed into The Eccentric Society Club, meeting at Tom Ree's in May's Building, St Martin's Lane, as well as several other addresses around Covent Garden until the club was finally dissolved in 1846.

At May's Building, they 'flourished at all hours' and among their members were many celebrities of the literary and political world; they were always treated with indulgence by the authorities. An inaugural ceremony was performed upon the making of a member, which terminated with a jubilation from the president. The books of the club, up to the time of its removal from May's Buildings, are stated to have passed into the possession of Robert Lloyd, a hatter of The Strand who was well known in his day as a writer, inventor and keen appreciator of philosophy.

From 1781 through to 1846, the Eccentrics numbered upward of some 40,000 members, many of them holding high social position, such as Charles James Fox, Richard Brinsley Sheridan, Lord Melbourne and Lord Brougham. On the same memorable night that Sheridan and Lord Petersham were admitted, Theodore Hook was also enrolled; and through this club membership, he is believed to have obtained some of his high connections. In a novel published in numbers, F. W. N. Bayley sketched with graphic vigour the meetings of 'The Eccentrics' at the old tavern in May's Buildings.

== Second Eccentric Club ==
A second Eccentric Club, considered to be unrelated, was founded in 1858 and disbanded in 1881. It existed in the Leicester Square area.

== Third Eccentric Club ==
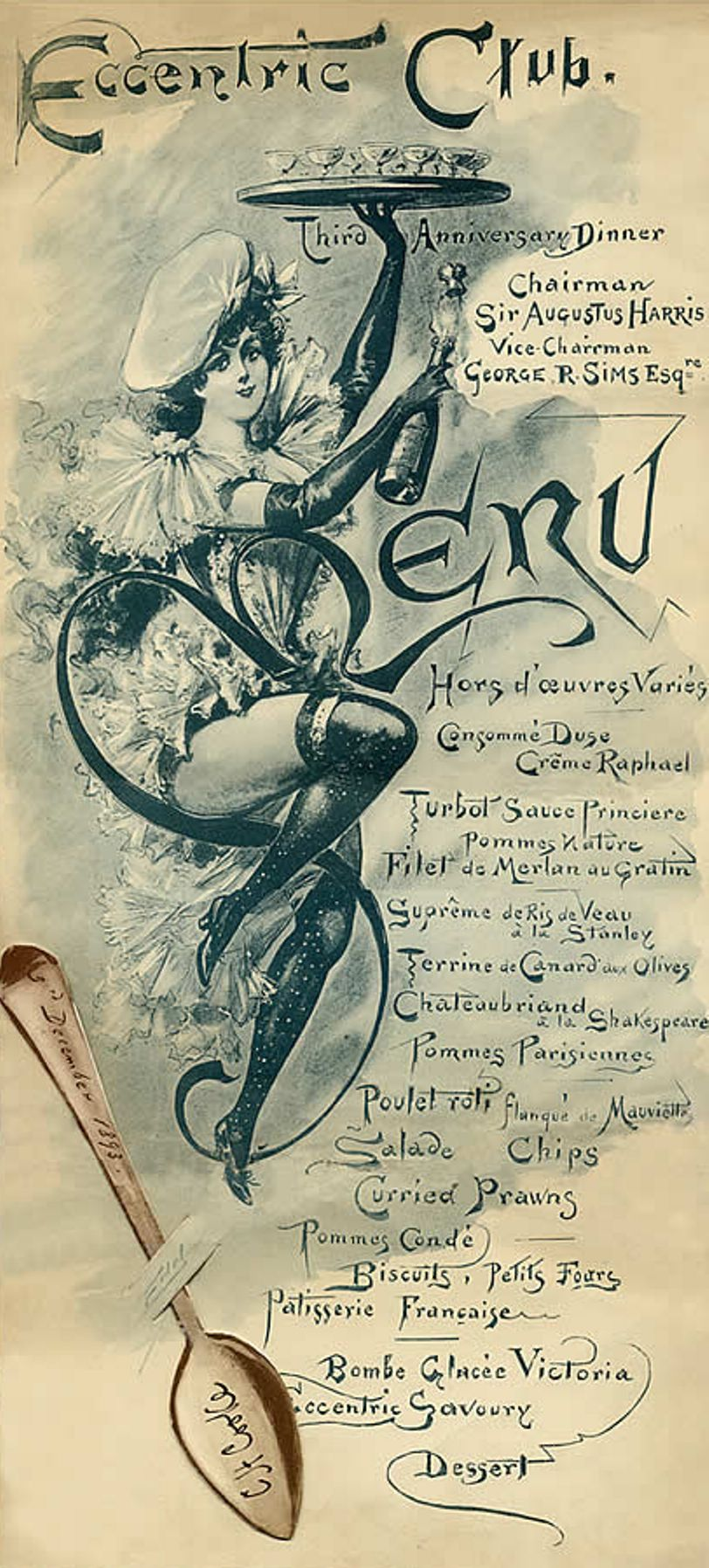
Club menu for December 1893

The third and longest-lived Eccentric Club was established by the theatrical costumier Jack Harrison on 21 November 1890 and disbanded in 1986. Immediately upon its foundation, it occupied the old premises of the Pelican Club in Denman Street, Soho. In 1893, it moved to 21 Shaftesbury Avenue. In 1914, the club moved to the former Dieudonné's Hotel at 9–11 Ryder Street, where it remained until its closure.

The club adopted the night-owl as its symbol. It was noted for the generosity of its members, who raised £25,000 for limbless soldiers during World War I, and every Christmas, Westminster's poor would queue up outside the Eccentric club for free meals.

Like many London clubs, it went through a period of financial hardship in the 1970s. The club closed its doors in 1984, ostensibly for a period of renovation, but was forced into liquidation in 1986.

In 1985, many of the club's membership were elected to the East India Club, where some of them continue to meet occasionally to this day in the American Bar which has a backward-running clock (a replica of the original which was once at the Eccentric Club). This is in keeping with numerous other London clubs of the nineteenth century which have lost their premises, but continue to meet as a society in an existing club; other examples include the Authors' Club and Savage Club now meeting in the National Liberal Club, the Portland Club meeting in the Savile Club, and the Canning Club now meeting in the Naval and Military Club. However, a considerable number of members refused to join the East India Club and instead joined the Royal Automobile Club and the Oxford and Cambridge Club; almost all members of the Eccentric Golfing Society went to the Ealing Golf Club.

=== Notable members ===
The third Eccentric Club's members included:

- Ernest Berry Webber
- Henry Ainley
- Sir George Alexander, actor
- Viscount Burnham
- Joseph Byrd (composer, scholar)
- Joe Davis
- Alfredo Leonardo Edel
- Sir Walter de Frece
- Jimmy Glover, musician
- Edward Douglas-Scott-Montagu
- Sir Gerald du Maurier
- Bud Flanagan
- Dudley Hardy
- Sir Augustus Harris
- Sir Seymour Hicks
- Dan Leno
- The Earl of Lonsdale
- Sir James Miller
- H. Montague-Bates
- Lord Montagu
- Maurice Paléologue
- Prince Philip, Duke of Edinburgh (patron, 1980–1986 and 2008–2021)
- George Robey
- George Robert Sims
- F. E. Smith
- Sir Herbert Tree
- Sir Frederick Wells
- Sir Henry Wood
- Sir Charles Wyndham

== Current club ==
In August 2008, a number of members of the old club and some new enthusiasts from other London clubs, with the blessing of Lord Montagu, the last president of the old club, founded the Eccentric Club UK. In November 2008, the club successfully secured the patronage of Prince Philip, Duke of Edinburgh, who was a Patron of the Eccentric Club between 1980 and 1986. Prince Philip would dine twice with the club.

The refounded club now has regular meetings at the Savile Club and the Oriental Club. It has resumed its traditional annual activities, including a snooker match and cricket match with the Savile Club. The revived club has registered the terms "Eccentric Club", "Nil Nisi Bonum" and the old club logo as its own trademarks.

== Continuity between the clubs ==
Its committee claims to be able to prove continuity between the earlier Eccentric Clubs, and thus, claims a foundation date of 1781, although the committee of the disbanded club and a number of authors claimed a foundation date of 1890.

On the other hand, a number of Victorian and Edwardian books and newspapers discussing the Eccentric Club in 1890 referred to the earlier Eccentric Clubs in London. In the only recorded interview with J.A.Harrison of the time, he also admits that the club is not new, although brought back in a new form and hence – established on 21 November 1890.

At the Third Anniversary Dinner in 1893, J.A.Harrison "traced back its origin to the Eccentric Club of 1800, which included Sheridan Knowles... Mr Harrison explained that the white owl was the crest of the old club, and had been adopted by the present one". Before the Second World War, a list of most treasured possessions of the Eccentric Club included the Ancient Book of the Eccentric Society presented to the club by S.J.Pallant. Similarly, there are references by Sir Charles Wyndham and other founding members to the earlier club they were reviving.

== See also ==
- List of members' clubs in London
