= Mark Feltham =

Mark Feltham may refer to:

- Mark Feltham (musician) (born 1955), English harmonica player
- Mark Feltham (cricketer) (born 1963), English cricketer

== See also ==
- Feltham (disambiguation)
