= Feltham (disambiguation) =

Feltham may refer to:

== Places ==
- Feltham, a town/district in the London Borough of Hounslow, England
- Feltham, a hamlet located in Pitminster, Somerset, England
- Feltham Prison and Young Offender Institution, prison in Feltham, London Borough of Hounslow, England

== Events ==
- Kauto Star Novices' Chase, originally known as the Feltham Novices' Chase

== Historic uses ==
- Feltham (UK Parliament constituency), a constituency between 1955 and 1974
- Feltham Urban District, local government area in the UK between 1904 and 1965

== Other ==
- Feltham (surname)
