= Mary Margaret Busk =

English writer, historian and translator

- Born: Mary Margaret Blair; 1779; Portland Place, London, England
- Died: January 11, 1863 (aged 83–84); London, England
- Occupations: writer, historian and translator
- Spouse: William Busk (m. 1796)

Mary Margaret Busk born Mary Margaret Blair (1779 – 11 January 1863) was an English writer and translator.

== Life ==
Busk was born in Portland Place in 1779. She was the daughter of Alexander Blair (1737–c.1816), a manufacturer and merchant in the Birmingham area, and sister of Alexander Blair who was also a writer. Their mother was Mary Johnson. Her father was an army officer, who in 1780 went into partnership with James Keir at Tipton. They made alloy window sashes, and alkali, and the venture became a successful soap manufacturer. The business with Keir included a coal mine. Blair also set up a business making masts, and bought land in the Canadian Maritimes. In later life he encountered financial problems.

She married well in 1796 and her husband William Busk (son of Wadsworth Busk) became a Member of Parliament (MP) for Barnstable in 1812 at some expense. He lost the seat the same year and he tried for many years to again support the Whigs. Her husband's income fell in 1819 and this may have been due to his gambling. Busk decided to write and using her brother's connections she was able to write for the Blackwood's Edinburgh Magazine in 1825. She had thirty pieces published over the next seven years and at the same time she did reviews for the Foreign Quarterly Review and the Athenaeum. Some of these were straight translations, but in others it is her curiosity which has chosen what to translate. She was bringing intriguing publications to the eye of the British reader although her work reflects her own presumption of English superiority.

By 1836 Busk was separating herself from her husband whose business affairs were facing even more difficulty. Busk decided to publish her next book herself by subscription and Plays and Poems was available in 1837. It is said that one of her poems, "Sordello", caused Robert Browning to rewrite and delay for three years his poem of the same name. In 1841, she published an account of Japan which she was never to visit, cobbled together on existing European accounts which was reprinted 3 times between 1843 and 1867.

Her knowledge and translation skills created Mediaeval popes, emperors, kings, and crusaders, or, Germany, Italy, and Palestine, from a.d. 1125 to a.d. 1268. The work ran to four volumes and was first published from 1854 to 1856.

Busk died at her home in London in 1863.

== Works ==
- The History of Spain and Portugal from B.C. 1000 to A.D. 1814 (1833)
