= William Busk =

- In office 16 January 1812 – 8 October 1812
- Constituency: Barnstaple

Personal details
- Born: 1769
- Died: 19 February 1849 Homburg, Germany
- Party: Whig
- Spouse: Mary Margaret Blair (m. 1796)
- Parent: Wadsworth Busk (father)
- Relatives: Hans Busk (brother); George Busk (nephew); Hans Busk (nephew); Julia Clara Byrne (niece); Rachel Harriette Busk (niece)

William Busk (1769 – 19 February 1849) was a British barrister, businessman and Whig politician who briefly served as a Member of Parliament (MP) for Barnstaple from January to October 1812. He married the author Mary Margaret Busk, who published under his name.

== Biography ==
William Busk was the fourth son of Wadsworth Busk, Attorney-General of the Isle of Man, and Alice Parish out of five. His paternal grandfather was Swedish with some French heritage. William Busk and his brothers grew up in Newtown; their adolescence is chronicled in middle brother Robert's diary. Their mother died in a carriage accident in 1776.

In 1796, Busk married Mary Margaret Blair, the daughter of Alexander Blair. The couple travelled often to mainland Europe.

Busk initially followed his father and eldest brother Edward into law, joining the Temple at King's Bench Walk in the 1790s as an equity draftsman. He then went into commerce, starting the Russia trade enterprise Busk & Company (later called Busk, Ord & Company, Russia merchants and then William Busk & Company) in 1802. He purchased the Ponsbourne Park estate in Hertfordshire circa 1811.

It is speculated Busk might have gotten into Whig politics through his father-in-law Alexander Blair, an admirer of Charles James Fox. Busk first ran for parliament in the 1810 Hythe by-election. He won the January 1812 Barnstable by-election. As an opposition MP, Busk was "not known to have spoken in the House" but consistently voted with his party. He lost his seat in the October 1812 general election, which he attributed to the "bribery of his opponents". Having spent "a good deal of money" on the two runs, he requested Baron Holland notify him of any nearby seat openings, but the opportunity never arose.

Facing financial trouble, Busk sold the Ponsbourne Park estate to his brother Jacob Hans Busk in 1819. He and his wife subsequently moved to London. The income from his wife's writing career supported the couple for a time, but by the mid 1830s, they had started to separate.

Busk died in Homburg.
