= Wadsworth Busk =

British lawyer

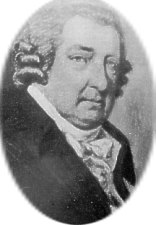
Sir Wadsworth Busk

Sir Wadsworth Busk (3 January 1730 – 15 December 1811) was Attorney-General of the Isle of Man from 1774 to 1797. He was knighted in 1781.

He entered Middle Temple in 1744 and was called to the bar in 1755.

After his career as attorney-general, he became Treasurer of Middle Temple.

== Family ==
Born in Leeds, Busk was the son of Swedish wool merchant Jacob Hans Busck who was naturalised British and whose grandfather was French, and Rachel Wadsworth. His older brother, Hans Busk (1718–1792), was the great-grandfather of Baron Houghton.

Wadsworth Busk married Alice Parish in January 1756; she died in a 1776 accident ascending Richmond Hill on the way to Newtown and was buried in Onchan. Their children were:

- Edward Busk (1765–1838) married 1800, Sarah Teshmaker, daughter, and co-heiress of Thomas Teshmaker, of Ford's Grove Winchmore Hill, Middlesex.
- Jacob Hans Busk (1767–1844) married Martha (1782 - 1846), daughter of Joseph Dawson of Royds Hall.
- Robert Busk (1768–1835), whose 1780s school-boy diary is held in the Museum of Manx Memories. He became a merchant; one of his children was the scientist George Busk.
- William Busk (1769–1849), briefly became the MP for Barnstable and married Mary Margaret Busk
- Hans Busk (1772–1862)

Sir Wadsworth married his second wife Sara in 1787. Lady Busk died in her 81st year in Bath in 1819.
