= The Illustrated London News =

British illustrated news magazine (1842–2003)

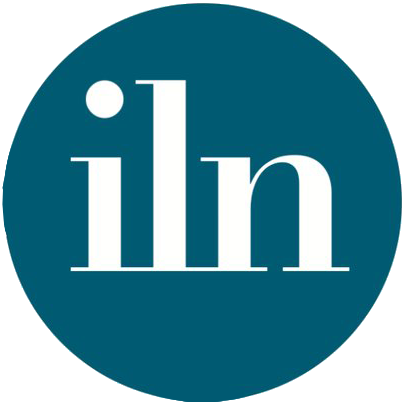

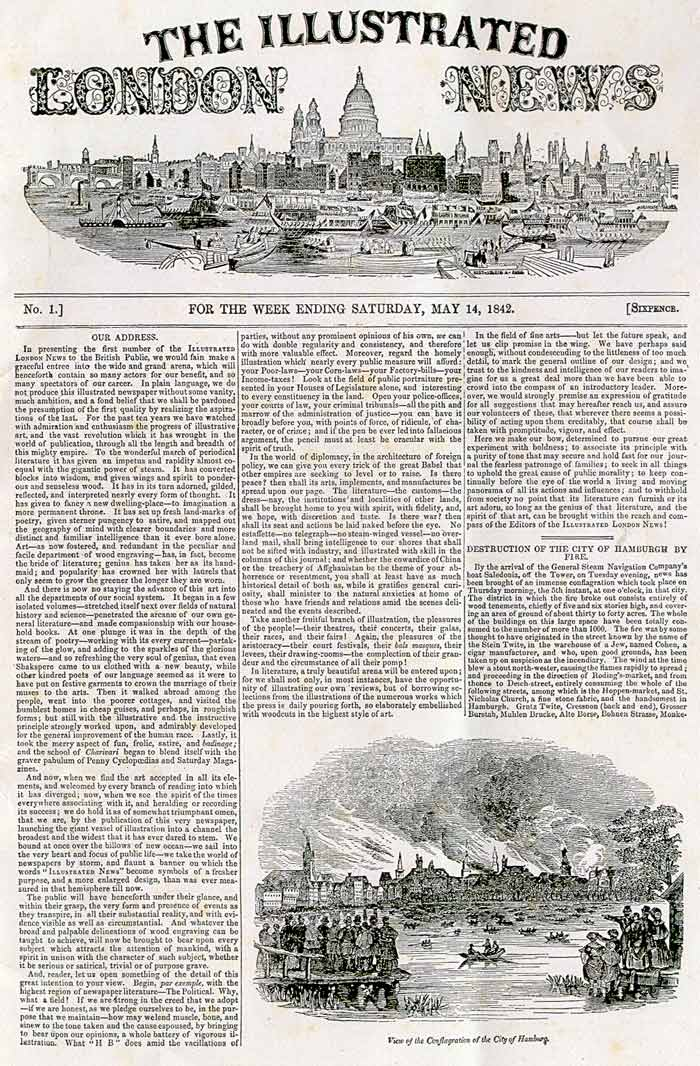
- Front-page of the magazine's first issue (May 14, 1842)
- Type: Weekly (1842–1971); Monthly (1971–1989); Quarterly (1989–1994); Twice-yearly (1994–2003)
- Format: Broadsheet news magazine
- Owner: Illustrated London News Group
- Founded: 1842
- Ceased publication: 2003
- Political alignment: Conservative
- Headquarters: London, England
- Website: iln.co.uk

The Illustrated London News, founded by Herbert Ingram and first published on Saturday 14 May 1842, was the world's first illustrated weekly news magazine. The magazine was published weekly for most of its existence, switched to a less frequent publication schedule in 1971, and eventually ceased publication in 2003. The company continues today as Illustrated London News Ltd, a publishing, content, and digital agency in London, which holds the publication and business archives of the magazine.

== History ==
=== 1842–1860: Herbert Ingram ===
The front cover of 1 October 1892 issue, showing a scene from Sydney Grundy and Arthur Sullivan's Haddon Hall created by M. Browne and Herbert Railton

The Illustrated London News founder Herbert Ingram was born in Boston, Lincolnshire, in 1811, and opened a printing, newsagent, and bookselling business in Nottingham around 1834 in partnership with his brother-in-law, Nathaniel Cooke. As a newsagent, Ingram was struck by the reliable increase in newspaper sales when they featured pictures and shocking stories. Ingram began to plan a weekly newspaper that would contain pictures in every edition.

Ingram rented an office, recruited artists and reporters, and employed as his editor Frederick William Naylor Bayley (1808–1853), formerly editor of the National Omnibus. The first issue of The Illustrated London News appeared on Saturday, 14 May 1842, timed to report on the young Queen Victoria's first masquerade ball. The 16 pages and 32 wood engravings of that first edition covered topics such as the war in Afghanistan, the Versailles rail accident, a survey of the candidates for the US presidential election, extensive crime reports, theatre and book reviews, and a list of births, marriages, and deaths. Ingram hired 200 men to carry placards through the streets of London promoting the first edition of his new newspaper.

Costing sixpence, the first issue sold 26,000 copies. Despite this initial success, sales of the second and subsequent editions were disappointing. However, Ingram was determined to make his newspaper a success, and sent every clergyman in the country a copy of the edition that contained illustrations of the installation of the Archbishop of Canterbury, and by this means secured a great many new subscribers.

Its circulation soon increased to 40,000, and by the end of its first year was 60,000. In 1851, after the newspaper published Joseph Paxton's designs for the Crystal Palace before even Prince Albert had seen them, the circulation rose to 130,000. In 1852, when it produced a special edition covering the funeral of the Duke of Wellington, sales increased to 150,000. In 1855, mainly due to the newspaper reproducing some of Roger Fenton's pioneering photographs of the Crimean War, and due to the abolition of the Stamp Act that taxed newspapers, it sold 200,000 copies per week.

Competitors soon began to appear. Lloyd's Illustrated Paper was founded later that year, while Reynold's Newspaper opened in 1850. Both were successful Victorian publications, albeit less successful than The Illustrated London News. Andrew Spottiswoode's Pictorial Times lost £20,000 before it was sold to Ingram by Henry Vizetelly, who had left the ILN to found it. Ingram folded it into another purchase, The Lady's Newspaper, which became The Lady's Newspaper and Pictorial Times. Vizetelly was also behind a later competitor, Illustrated Times in 1855, which was similarly bought out by Ingram in 1859.

Ingram's other early collaborators left the business in the 1850s. Nathanial Cooke, his business partner and brother-in-law, found himself in a subordinate role in the business and parted on bad terms around 1854. The departure of William Little was in 1858. In addition to providing a loan of £10,000, he was the printer and publisher of the paper for 15 years. Little's relationship with Ingram deteriorated over Ingram's harassment of their mutual sister-in-law.

Herbert Ingram died on 8 September 1860 in a paddle-steamer accident on Lake Michigan, and he was succeeded as proprietor by his youngest son, William Ingram, who in turn was succeeded by his son, Sir Bruce Ingram (1877–1963) in 1900, who remained as editor until his death.

=== 1860–1900: William and Charles Ingram ===
By 1863, The Illustrated London News was selling more than 300,000 copies every week, enormous figures in comparison to other British newspapers of the time. The death of Herbert and his eldest son left the company without a director and manager. Control passed to Ingram's widow Ann, and his friend Sir Edward William Watkin, who managed the business for 12 years. Once Ingram's two younger sons, William and Charles, were old enough, they took over as managing directors, although William took the lead.

This was also a period of expansion and increased competition for the ILN. As reading habits and the illustrated news market changed, the ILN bought or established a number of new publications, evolving from a single newspaper to a larger-scale publishing business. As with Herbert Ingram's purchases in the 1850s, this expansion was also an effective way of managing competition – dominating markets and buying out competing ventures. As with the acquisitions of the 1850s, several similar illustrated publications were established in this period by former employees of The Illustrated London News.

Serious competition for the ILN appeared in 1869, with the establishment of The Graphic, a weekly illustrated paper co-founded by William Luson Thomas. Thomas was a former wood engraver for The Illustrated London News, and brought his expertise in illustrated publishing to his new magazine. The Graphic was highly popular, particularly for its coverage of the Franco-Prussian War in 1870, and was well regarded among artists; Vincent van Gogh was a particular admirer.

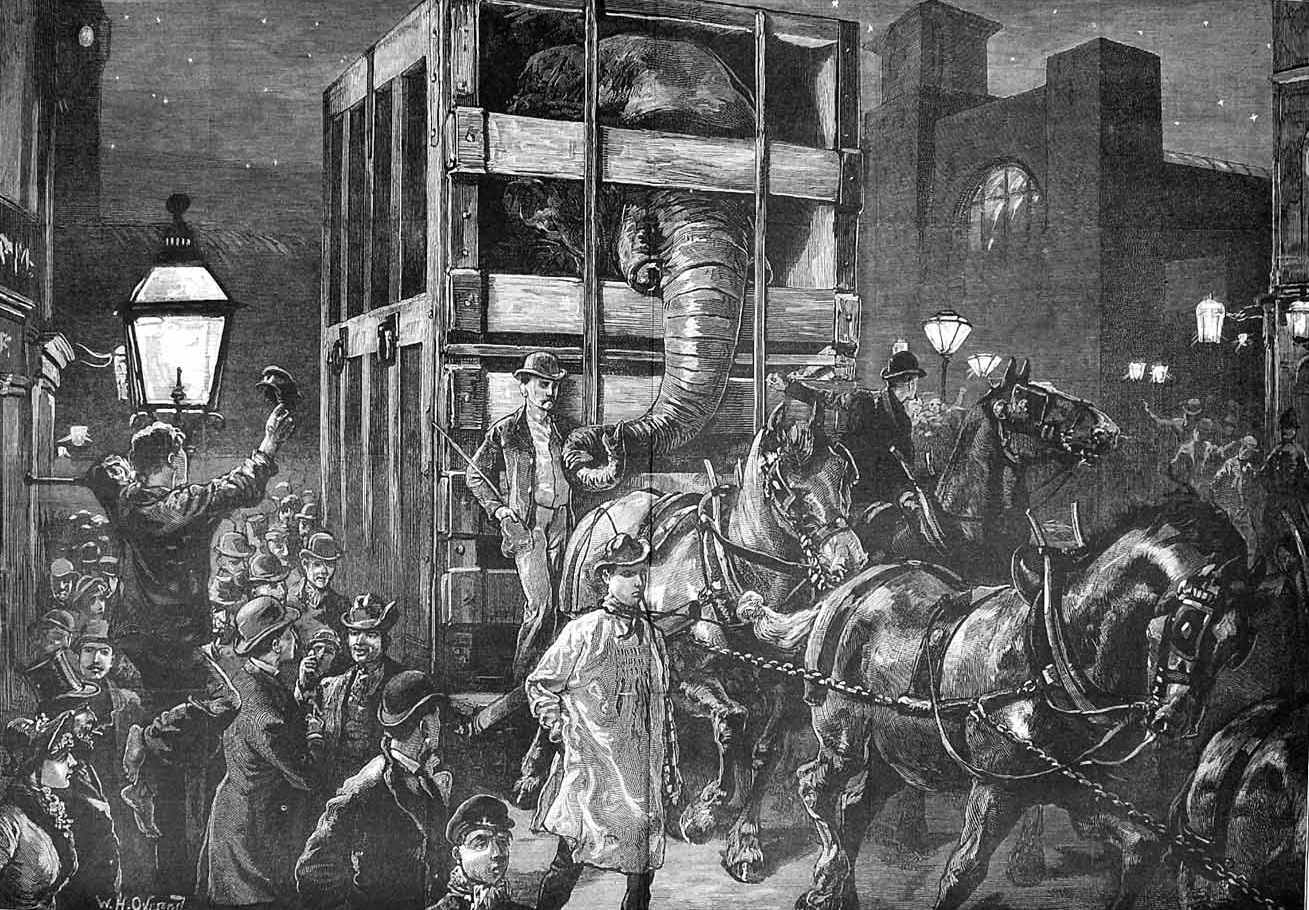
Jumbo's Journey to the Docks, The Illustrated London News, 1 April 1882

William Ingram became chief proprietor of The Illustrated Sporting and Dramatic News, est. 1874, and The Lady's Pictorial, which may have been a later title of The Lady's Newspaper and Pictorial Times. The Penny Illustrated Paper, aimed at a working-class readership, was established by the news company shortly after Ingram's death in 1861 in response to the abolition of stamp and paper taxes, which made cheaper publications possible. The Penny Illustrated Paper ran until 1913.

In 1893, the ILN established The Sketch, a sister publication that covered lighter news and society events with the same focus on illustration. From this point, the name of the company changed to the Illustrated London News and Sketch Ltd.

In 1899, ILN editor Clement Shorter left the paper to found his own publication, The Sphere, which published its first issue on 27 January 1900. Ingram and The Illustrated London News responded by establishing a competing magazine, The Spear, which appeared two days before The Sphere on 25 January 1900. The name was deliberately chosen to confuse and siphon off readers, and advertisements for The Sphere emphasised the difference between the magazines: "S-P-H-E-R-E… you may be offered something else you don't want."

While editor of the ILN, Clement Shorter had been instrumental in the establishment and publication of The Sketch. In 1903, he established The Tatler as a similar sister publication for The Sphere, with a similar focus on illustrated culture and society news. With the departure of Shorter, the role of editor of the ILN was taken over by Bruce Ingram, the 23-year-old grandson of the paper's founder.

=== 1900–1963: Bruce Ingram ===
Bruce Ingram was editor of The Illustrated London News and (from 1905) The Sketch, and ran the company for the next 63 years, presiding over some significant changes in the newspaper and the publishing business as a whole.

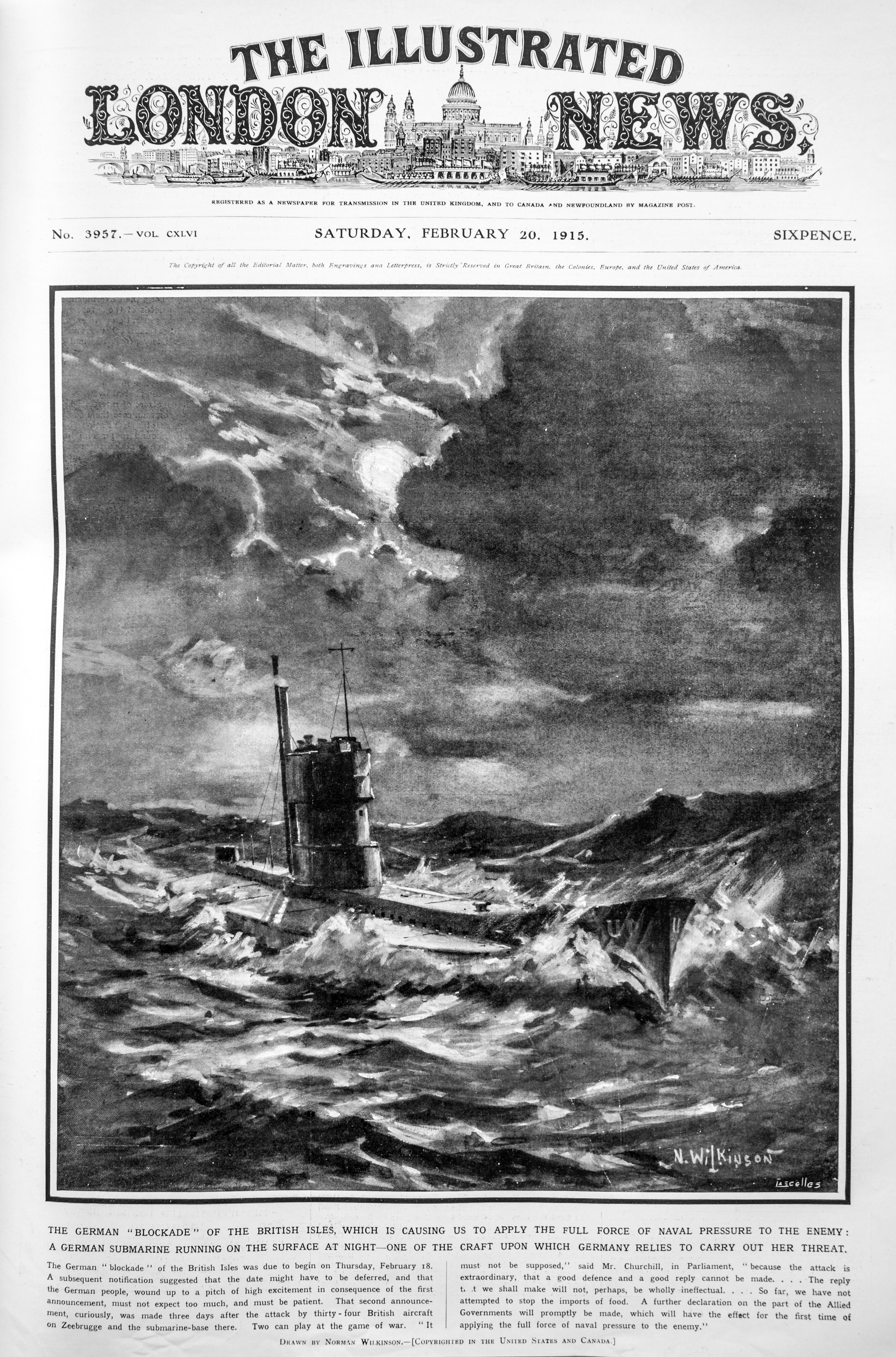
Cover of 20 February 1915 issue

Photographic and printing techniques were advancing in the later years of the 19th century, and The Illustrated London News began to introduce photos and artwork into its depictions of weekly events. From about 1890, The Illustrated London News made increasing use of photography. The tradition of graphic illustrations continued until the end of World War I. Often, rough sketches of distant events with handwritten explanations were supplied by observers and then worked on by artists in London to produce polished end products for publication. This was particularly the case where popular subjects such as colonial or foreign military campaigns did not lend themselves to clear illustration using the limited camera technology of the period. By the 1920s and 1930s, the pictures that dominated each issue of the magazine were almost exclusively photographic, although artists might still be used to illustrate in pictorial form topics such as budgetary expenditure or the layout of coal mines.

In 1928, a major business merger had Illustrated London News move to new headquarters at Inveresk House, 1 Aldwych, (also known as 364 Strand), London, where The Illustrated London News and The Sketch were united with six of their former competitors under the parent company, Illustrated News Ltd. As eight of the largest titles in illustrated news, these were newly dubbed the "Great Eight" publications. The Illustrated London News, the flagship publication, was supported by sister publications The Sketch, The Sphere, The Tatler, The Graphic, The Illustrated Sporting and Dramatic News, The Bystander, and Eve. With the exception of The Tatler, these publications remained as part of Illustrated News Ltd. until their closure at various times in the 20th century.

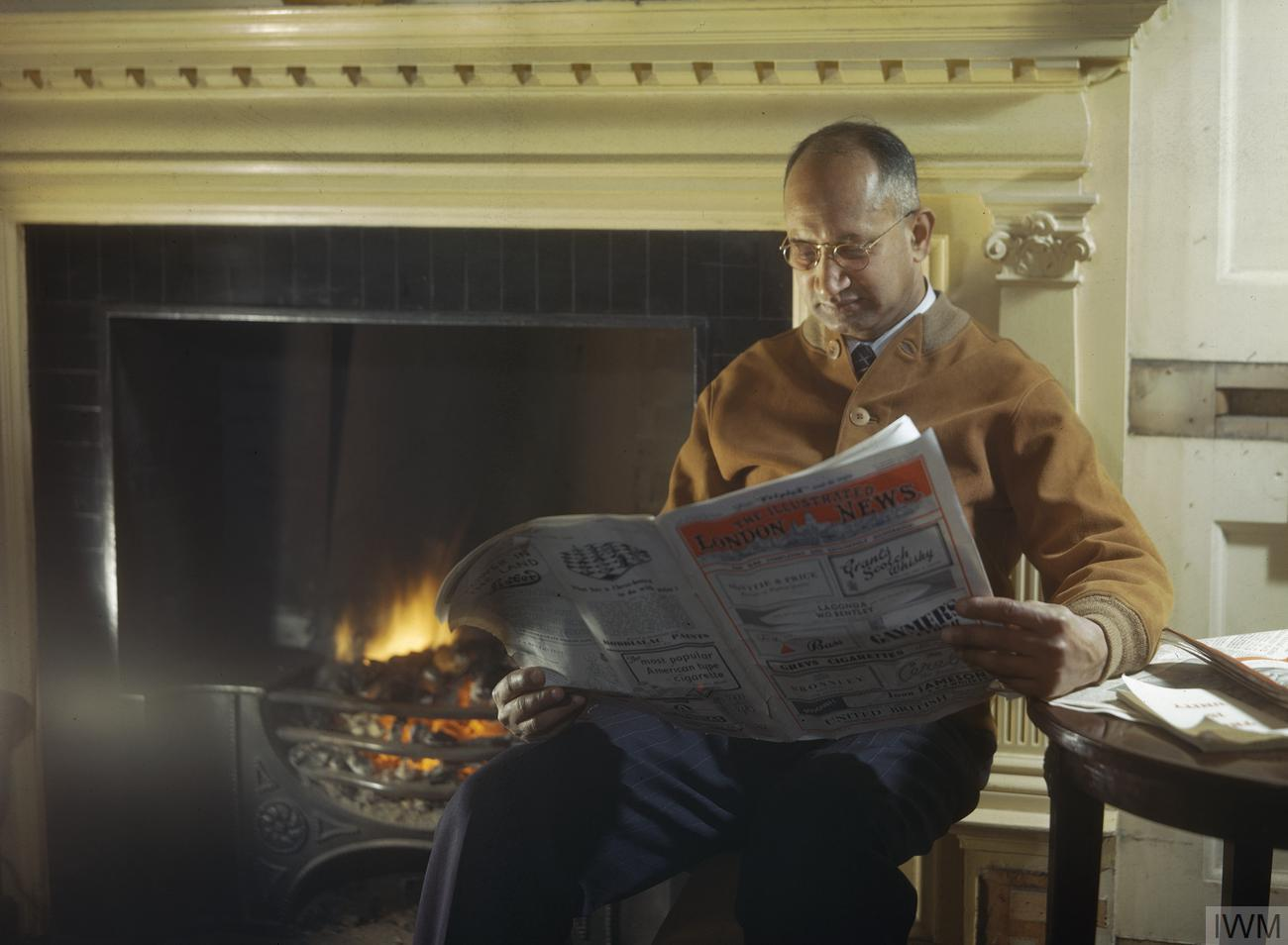
A man reading The Illustrated London News, 1944

The centenary of The Illustrated London News in 1942 was muted due to wartime conditions, including restrictions on the use of paper. The occasion was marked in the paper with a set of specially commissioned colour photographs of the royal family, including the future Queen Elizabeth. By the time of his death in 1963, Ingram was a major figure in the newspaper industry, and the longest-standing editor of his day.

=== 1963–present ===
In the postwar period, print publications were gradually displaced from their central position in reporting news events, and circulation began to fall for all the illustrated weeklies. Many of the Great Eight publications were closed down after the Second World War; The Sketch, The Illustrated Sporting and Dramatic News, and The Sphere all ceased publication in these years.

In 1961, Illustrated Newspapers Ltd was bought by International Thomson, headed by Roy Thomson, a Canadian newspaper mogul. The Sphere ceased publication in 1964, while The Tatler was sold in 1968. It was later revived and relaunched in 1977. With circulation figures continuing to fall, The Illustrated London News switched from weekly to monthly publication in 1971, with a new focus on in-depth reporting and selective coverage of world events. This strategy continued into the late 1980s, when the paper reduced its frequency to four issues a year.

In 1985, The Illustrated London News and the archives of the Great Eight publications were sold to Sea Containers, an international transport corporation headed by James Sherwood. Along with the Illustrated London News Group, Sea Containers operated the Orient Express and Great North Eastern Railway, and a range of luxury hotels. As part of this activity, Illustrated London News Group launched a luxury travel and lifestyle magazine, Orient Express.

In 1994, publication of The Illustrated London News was reduced further to two issues a year, and the publishing activity of the Illustrated London News Group focused increasingly on the Orient Express magazine. After publishing its last Christmas number in 2001, The Illustrated London News was relaunched in 2003 under the editorship of Mark Palmer, which ran for one issue before finally ceasing publication for good.

In 2007, The Illustrated London News Group underwent a management buy-out, and was re-established as Illustrated London News Ltd. From 2007, it has continued its activity as an independent content and creative agency. In 2007, the former Orient Express magazine was relaunched as Sphere, a luxury lifestyle and travel magazine. In addition to its independent publications, Illustrated London News Ltd now acts as a content agency for various other luxury and heritage organisations.

Illustrated London News Ltd has managed the newspaper and business archive of The Illustrated London News and the Great Eight publications, publishing short books and magazines of historical content from the Great Eight publication archives. In 2010, Gale digitised the entire back catalogue of The Illustrated London News (1842–2003), and in 2014 began digitalizing the remaining seven publications in the Great Eight. To mark the centenary of the First World War in July 2014, ILN Ltd launched illustratedfirstworldwar.com, a free historical resource funded by the Heritage Lottery Fund. The entire run of the Great Eight publications between 1914 and 1918 is available on this site.

Illustrated London News Limited continues to operate as a content marketing agency and publisher, specialising in the luxury and heritage sectors. The company publishes SPHERE magazine as a quarterly publication in print and as spherelife in digital and Royalty in Britain a bi-annual newsstand title covering royalty and heritage, published in collaboration with the Royal Warrant Holders Association. The majority shareholder is Lisa Barnard, Chief Executive, who has run the ILN business since 2000. The company operates at The Tea Building, 56 Shoreditch High Street, London E1 6JJ.

== Collaborators ==
The first generation of draughtsmen and engravers included Sir John Gilbert, Birket Foster, and George Cruikshank among the former, and W. J. Linton, Ebenezer Landells, and George Thomas among the latter. Regular literary contributors included Douglas Jerrold, Richard Garnett, and Shirley Brooks.

Illustrators, artists, and photographers included Edward Duncan, Bruce Bairnsfather, H. M. Bateman, Edmund Blampied, Mabel Lucie Attwell, E. H. Shepherd, Kate Greenaway, John Proctor, W. Heath Robinson and his brother Charles Robinson, Rebecca Solomon, George E. Studdy, David Wright, Melton Prior, William Simpson, Frederic Villiers, H. C. Seppings-Wright, Myles Birket Foster, Frank Reynolds, Lawson Wood, C. E. Turner, R. Caton Woodville Jr, A. Forestier, Fortunino Matania, Christina Broom, Louis Wain, J. Segrelles, and Frank Vizetelly.

Writers and journalists included Robert Louis Stevenson, Thomas Hardy, George Augustus Sala, J. M. Barrie, Wilkie Collins, Rudyard Kipling, G. K. Chesterton, Joseph Conrad, Camilla Dufour Crosland, Sir Arthur Conan Doyle, Sir Charles Petrie, Agatha Christie, Arthur Bryant, and Tim Beaumont (who wrote about food).

== Chief editors ==
- 1842–1848: Frederick William Naylor Bayley (assistant: John Timbs)
- 1848–1859: Charles Mackay
- 1860–1862: William J. Stewart
- 1863–1890: John Lash Latey
- 1891–1900: Clement King Shorter
- 1900–1963: Sir Bruce Ingram
- 1963–1965: Hugh Ingram
- 1965–1970: Timothy Green
- 1967–1970: John Kisch
- 1970–1994: James Bishop
- 1995–2003: Mark Palmer

Note: sources are contradictory in some cases. An alternative listing for the period 1842–59 is 1842–46: F. W. N. Bayley; 1846–52: John Timbs; 1852–59: Charles Mackay

== Archive ==
The archives of The Illustrated London News, The Sketch, The Sphere, The Tatler, The Bystander, The Graphic, The Illustrated War News, The Illustrated Sporting and Dramatic News, and Britannia and Eve are owned by Illustrated London News (ILN) Limited. ILN Ltd also holds company records of the Illustrated London News, Illustrated Newspapers Ltd and the Illustrated London News Group.

In 2010, the entire back catalogue of The Illustrated London News was digitised, and is available online by subscription. The entire run of The Illustrated London News between 1914 and 1919 is available for free online.

The archive for 1842 to 2003 can be searched through public libraries in several countries, and is held by Gale Primary Sources.

TheGenealogist has a full collection online available from 1842 to 1879 and a number of issues from 1890.

The original woodblocks of the first issue are held by the Victoria and Albert Museum, London.

== In popular culture ==
In Jules Verne's fictional Around the World in Eighty Days, The Illustrated London News is referenced as reporting extensively on Phileas Fogg's travel around the world. The paper is mentioned as publishing Fogg's portrait, based on a photo obtained from the Reform Club of which Fogg was a member.

The nineteenth-century operations of the Illustrated London News were portrayed in the 2021 biopic, The Electrical Life of Louis Wain, starring Benedict Cumberbatch as Louis Wain, one of the publication's illustrators, and Claire Foy as his wife, Emily Richardson-Wain.

== See also ==
- Frederick Marriott
