= Walter Feltham =

English cricketer (1864–1904)

Personal information
- Full name: Walter George Feltham
- Born: 23 April 1864; Ringwood, Hampshire, England
- Died: 23 September 1904 (aged 40); Ringwood, Hampshire, England
- Batting: Left-handed
- Bowling: Left-arm fast

Domestic team information
- Years: Team
- 1884: Hampshire

Career statistics
Competition	First-class
Matches	3
Runs scored	1
Batting average	0.25
100s/50s	–/–
Top score	1
Balls bowled	541
Wickets	12
Bowling average	21.16
5 wickets in innings	–
10 wickets in match	–
Best bowling	4/54
Catches/stumpings	1/–
- Source: Cricinfo, 18 January 2010

Walter George Feltham (23 April 1864 – 23 September 1904) was an English first-class cricketer.

Feltham was born at in April 1864 at Ringwood, Hampshire. He made three appearances in first-class cricket for Hampshire in 1884 at Southampton, against Surrey, Sussex, and Somerset. Playing as a left-arm fast bowler, he took 12 wickets at an average of 9.37, with best figures of 4 for 54 against Somerset. Outside of cricket, Feltham was a grocer in Ringwood. In December 1887, he was charged with being drunk and disorderly and was fined. Feltham died at Ringwood in September 1904.
