= Christopher Feltham =

Australian-born English cricketer

Personal information
- Full name: Christopher Glen Feltham
- Born: 8 September 1972 (age 54); Sydney, Australia
- Batting: Right-handed
- Bowling: Off break

Domestic team information
- Years: Team
- 1996–1997: Staffordshire

Career statistics
Competition	List A
Matches	2
Runs scored	24
Batting average	24.00
100s/50s	–/–
Top score	18
Balls bowled	11
Wickets	–
Bowling average	–
5 wickets in innings	–
10 wickets in match	–
Best bowling	–
Catches/stumpings	–/–
- Source: Cricinfo, 15 June 2011

Christopher Glen Feltham (born 8 September 1972) is an Australian born former English cricketer. Feltham was a right-handed batsman who bowled right-arm off break. He was born in Sydney.

Feltham made his debut for Staffordshire in the 1996 MCCA Knockout Trophy against Norfolk. Feltham played Minor counties cricket for Staffordshire from 1996 to 1997, which included 17 Minor Counties Championship matches and 3 MCCA Knockout Trophy matches. In 1996, he made his List A debut against Derbyshire in the NatWest Trophy. He played a further List A match against Nottinghamshire in the 1997 NatWest Trophy. In his 2 List A matches, he scored 24.
