= Aaron Feltham =

Aaron Feltham may refer to:

- Aaron Feltham (water polo) (born 1982), Canadian water polo player
- Aaron Feltham (curler) (born 2003), Canadian curler
