= Arthur Feltham =

English rugby league footballer

Personal information
- Full name: Arthur Feltham

Playing information
Club
Years	Team	Pld	T	G	FG	P
1926–30	Castleford	60	3	50	3	115

Arthur Feltham was a professional rugby league footballer who played in the 1920s and 1930s. He played at club level for Castleford, during his time at Castleford he scored three 2-point drop goals.
