= John Feltham Danneley =

English writer on music

John Feltham Danneley (baptised 1785 – c.1835) was an English writer on music.

== Life ==
The second son of George Danneley, a lay clerk of St. George's Chapel, Windsor, and his wife Elizabeth, he was born at Wokingham, Berkshire, into a family who had come down in the world. His first musical instruction was from his father, and at the age of 15 he studied thorough bass with Samuel Webbe and the pianoforte under Charles Knyvett, and then Charles Neate. He is also said to have had some lessons from Joseph Woelfl, presumably later, as Woelfl only settled in England in 1805.

About 1803, Danneley abandoned music to live with a rich uncle, from whom he had expectations; but later resumed his musical studies. Until 1812 he lived with his mother at Odiham, where he became interested in continental music and languages from intercourse with prisoners of war quartered there. In 1812 he went to Ipswich as a teacher of music; a few years later he was appointed organist of the church of St. Mary of the Tower.

In 1816, Danneley visited Paris, where he studied under Anton Reicha, Louis-Barthélémy Pradher, and Aleksander Mirecki, and encountered Pierre-Alexandre Monsigny and Luigi Cherubini. He returned to Ipswich. He was married in 1822, and around 1824 seems to have settled in London.

Details of the latter years of Danneley's career in London are scanty. He published music at 22 Tavistock Place, and in the post-office directories from 1832 to 1834 his name occurs as a music seller and publisher of 13 Regent Street.

== Works ==
Danneley published:

- Introduction to the Elementary Principles of Thorough Bass and Classical Music (Ipswich, 1820)
- Palinodia a Nice, set of thirteen vocal duets
- An Encyclopædia or Dictionary of Music (1825)
- Musical Grammar (1825), the preface dated from 92 Norton Street, Portland Place. London
- Article on Music (1829) in the London Encyclopædia
- The Nosegay: a Gage d'Amour and Musical Cadeau for 1832, with F. W. N. Bayley, from 13 Regent Street, London.
- Sonatinas for the pianoforte, and songs.
