= F. W. N. Bayley =

English miscellaneous writer

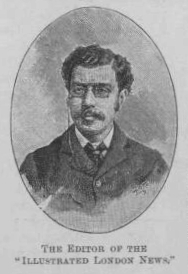
- F. W. N. Bayley, when first Editor of the Illustrated London News
- Born: 1808
- Died: 1853 (aged 44–45) Birmingham

Frederick William Naylor Bayley (1808–1853) was an English miscellaneous writer. He was also known as "Alphabet" Bayley due to his many initials or Omnibus Bayley for a past post as editor of Omnibus.

== Life ==
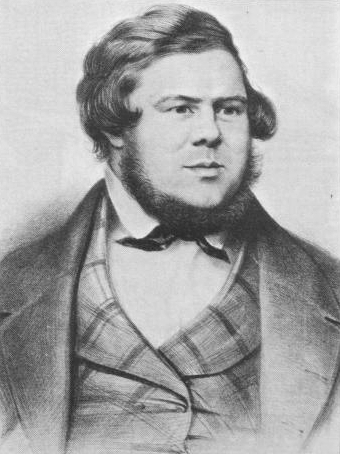
Alphabet Bayley, later in his tenure

Bayley, in 1825 accompanied his father, who was in the army, to Barbados, and remained in the West Indies for four years. About the time of his return to England in 1829, he found that he was able to write in verse with considerable facility. He conducted a publication called the Omnibus, and was the first editor of the Illustrated London News (established in 1842). Bayley was improvident, and was constantly in difficulties. He died at Birmingham of bronchitis in 1853, and was buried in the cemetery there.

== Works ==
He also produced 'An Island (Grenada) Bagatelle,' 1829; 'Four Years' Residence in the West Indies,' 1830; verses written for 'Six Sketches of Taglioni,' 1831; 'Tales of the late Revolution,' 1831; 'Scenes and Stories by a Clergyman in Debt,' 3 vols. 1835; 'New Tale of a Tub,' 1841 and 1847; 'Blue Beard,' 1842; 'Little Red Riding Hood,' 1843; an edition of the Works of Mrs. Sigourney, 1850; a contribution to the 'Little Folks' Laughing Library,' 1851; verses in 'Gems for the Drawing-room,' 1852; verses in Paul Jerrard's Humming Bird Keepsake, 1852.
