= Pechell =

Pechell may refer to:

== People ==
- Pechell baronets, including a list of people
- George Brooke-Pechell (born George Richard Pechell; 1789–1860), British Royal Navy officer and Whig politician
- Gladys Brooke-Pechell (1894–1974), visual artist, novelist and poet
- George Pechell Mends (1815–1871), English sailor and amateur artist
- John Pechell (1630–1690), English academic, Master of Magdalene College, Cambridge, Vice-Chancellor of the University of Cambridge
- Mark Robert Pechell (1830–1902), British Royal Navy officer during the Crimean War 1854–1855
- Paul Pechell (1724–1800), army officer, descendant of minor Huguenot nobility of Languedoc
- Samuel Pechell CB, KCH, FRS (1785–1849), British Royal Navy officer

== Geography ==
- Mount Pechell, a peak in the Anare Mountains of Antarctica

== See also ==
- Pachal (disambiguation)
- Pachil
- Pecel
- Pechüle
