= Dobrée =

Dobrée is a surname. Notable people with the surname include:

- Bonamy Dobrée (1891–1974), professor of English literature at the University of Leeds
- Bonamy Dobrée (banker), governor of the Bank of England from 1859 to 1861
- Georgina Dobrée (1930–2008), English clarinettist
- Louisa Emily Dobrée (fl. ca. 1877–1917), French writer
- Peter Paul Dobrée (1782–1825), English classical scholar and critic
- Valentine Dobrée (1894–1974), visual artist, novelist and poet

== See also ==
- John Dobree Dalgairns (1818–1876), English Roman Catholic priest

== See also ==
- Musée Dobrée, a museum in Nantes, France
