= Thompson baronets of Virkees (1797) =

Escutcheon of the Thompson baronets of Virkees

The Thompson Baronetcy, of Virkees (Virhees) in the County of Sussex, was created in the Baronetage of Great Britain on 23 June 1797 for the naval officer Charles Thompson, in recognition of his actions earlier in the year at the Battle of Cape St. Vincent. Born out of wedlock, he was the supposed son of Norborne Berkeley, 4th Baron Botetourt. He represented Monmouth in the House of Commons from 1796 to 1799.

The title became extinct on the death of the 3rd Baronet in 1868.

== Thompson baronets, of Virkees (1797) ==
- Sir Charles Thompson, 1st Baronet (c. 1740–1799)
- Sir Norborne Thompson, 2nd Baronet (1785–1826)
- Sir Henry Thompson, 3rd Baronet (1796–1868)

== Notes ==
Baronetage of Great Britain
Preceded by Pechell baronets	Thompson baronets of Virkees; 23 June 1797	Succeeded by Parker baronets
