= Parker baronets of Harburn (1797) =

The Parker baronetcy, of Harburn in the County of Warwick, was created in the Baronetage of Great Britain on 24 July 1797 for William Parker for his service at the Battle of Cape St Vincent. He retired as a vice admiral. The baronetcy became extinct on the death of the 6th Baronet in 1903.

== Parker baronets, of Harburn (1797) ==
- Sir William Parker, 1st Baronet (1743–1802)
- Sir William George Parker, 2nd Baronet (1787–1848)
- Sir George Parker, 3rd Baronet (1813–1857)
- Sir George Law Marshall Parker, 4th Baronet (1840–1866)
- Sir Henry Parker, 5th Baronet (1822–1877)
- Sir Melville Parker, 6th Baronet (1824–1903), died leaving no heir.

Coat of arms of Parker of Harburn
Crest On a naval crown az., a white halt at gaze in front of a slip of oak ppr. Escutcheon Erm. an anchor erect az. between three escallops gu. on a chief wavy of the second a naval crown or.

== Notes ==
Baronetage of Great Britain
Preceded by Thompson baronets	Parker baronets of Harburn; 24 July 1797	Succeeded by Onslow baronets
