= List of baronetcies in the Baronetage of the United Kingdom: T =

Peerages and baronetcies of Britain and Ireland
Extant	All
Dukes	Dukedoms
Marquesses	Marquessates
Earls	Earldoms
Viscounts	Viscountcies
Barons	Baronies
Baronets	Baronetcies
En, Ire, NS, GB, UK (extinct)

This is a list of baronetcies in the Baronetage of the United Kingdom. They have been created since 1801 when they replaced the baronetages in the Baronetage of Great Britain, and Baronetage of Ireland. This list is not currently complete.

Title	Date of creation	Surname	Current status	Notes
Tangye of Glendorgal	1912	Tangye	extinct 1969	
Tarleton of Liverpool	1816	Tarleton	extinct 1833	
Tate of Trefnant	1898	Tate	extant	
Tatem of St Fagans	1916	Tatem	extinct 1942	first Baronet created Baron Glanely in 1918
Taylor of Cawthorne	1963	Taylor	extinct 1972	
Taylor of Hollycombe	1828	Taylor	extinct 1876	
Tempest of Broughton Hall	1841	Tempest	extinct 1865	
Tempest of Heaton	1866	Tempest	extinct 1894	
Temple of the Nash	1876	Temple	extant	
Tennant of The Glen	1885	Tennant	extant	second Baronet created Baron Glenconner in 1911
Tennyson-d'Eyncourt of Carters Corner Farm	1930	Tennyson-d'Eyncourt	extant	
Thatcher of Scotney	1991	Thatcher	extant	
Thomas-Stanford of Brighton	1929	Thomas-Stanford	extinct 1932	
Thomas of Garreglwyd	1918	Thomas	extant	
Thomas of Ynyshir	1919	Thomas	extant	
Thompson of Park Gate	1890	Thompson	extant	
Thompson of Hartsbourne Manor	1806	Thompson	extant	
Thompson of Reculver	1963	Thompson	extant	
Thompson of Walton-on-the-Hill	1963	Thompson	extant	
Thompson of Wimpole Street	1899	Thompson	extinct 1944	
Thomson of Glendarroch	1929	Thomson	extant	
Thomson of Monken Hadley	1938	Thomson	extinct 1953	
Thomson of Old Nunthorpe	1925	Thomson	extant	
Thornhill of Riddlesworth Hall and Pakenham Lodge	1885	Thornhill, Compton-Thornhill	extinct 1949	
Thursby of Ormerod House	1887	Thursby	extinct 1941	
Tierney of Brighton	1818	Tierney	extinct 1845	first Baronet obtained a new patent in 1834, which creation became extinct in 1860
Tierney of Brighton	1834	Tierney	extinct 1860	first Baronet had already been created a Baronet in 1818, which title became extinct in 1845
Tomlinson of Richmond Terrace	1902	Tomlinson	extinct 1912	
Touche of Dorking	1962	Touche	extant	
Touche of Westcott	1920	Touche	extant	
Townsend-Farquhar of Mauritius	1821	Townsend-Farquhar	extinct 1924	
Treloar of Grange Mount	1907	Treloar	extinct 1923	Lord Mayor of London
Trenchard of Wolfeton	1919	Trenchard	extant	first Baronet created Viscount Trenchard in 1936
Trevelyan of Madras	1874	Trevelyan	extant	
Treves of Dorchester	1902	Treves	extinct 1923	
Tritton of Bloomfield	1905	Tritton	extant	
Trotter of West Ville	1821	Trotter, Lindsay	extinct 1913	
Truscott of Oakleigh	1909	Truscott	extant	Lord Mayor of London; unproven (third Baronet died 2001) - under review
Tubbs of Wooton-under-Edge	1929	Tubbs	extinct 1941	
Tuck of Park Crescent	1910	Tuck	extant	
Tufton of Appleby Castle, Skipton Castle and Hothfield Place	1851	Tufton	extant	second Baronet created Baron Hothfield in 1881
Tupper of Armdale	1888	Tupper	extant	
Turton of Upsall	1926	Turton	extinct 1929	
Twisleton-Wykeham-Fiennes of Banbury	1916	Twisleton-Wykeham-Fiennes	extant	
Tyler of Queenhithe and Penywern Road	1894	Tyler	extinct 1907	Lord Mayor of London
Tyrell of Boreham	1809	Tyrell	extinct 1877	
Jones, later Tyrwhitt, later Tyrwhitt-Wilson of Stanley Hall	1808	Jones, Tyrwhitt, Tyrwhitt-Wilson	extinct 1950	also Baron Berners from 1917 to 1950
Tyrwhitt of Terschelling	1919	Tyrwhitt	extant	
