= Onslow baronets of Althain (1797) =

Escutcheon of the Onslow baronets of Althain

The Onslow baronetcy, of Althain in the County of Lancaster, was created in the Baronetage of Great Britain on 30 October 1797 for the naval commander Sir Richard Onslow. The title was awarded in recognition of his services at the Battle of Camperdown where he was second in command. Onslow was the second son of Lieutenant-General Richard Onslow, uncle of the 1st Earl of Onslow.

The present holder of the baronetcy is in special remainder to the barony of Onslow.

== Onslow baronets, of Althain (1797) ==
- Sir Richard Onslow, 1st Baronet (1741–1817).
- Sir Henry Onslow, 2nd Baronet (1784–1853).
- Sir Henry Onslow, 3rd Baronet (1809–1870).
- Sir Matthew Richard Onslow, 4th Baronet (1810–1876).
- Sir William Wallace Rhoderic Onslow, 5th Baronet (1845–1916).
- Sir Roger Warin Beaconsfield Onslow, 6th Baronet (1880–1931)
- Sir Richard Wilmot Onslow, 7th Baronet (1906–1963)
- Sir John Roger Wilmot Onslow, 8th Baronet (1932–2009)
- Sir Richard Paul Atherton Onslow, 9th Baronet (born 1958)

The heir apparent is Harry Alexander John Onslow (born 1986), son of the current holder.

== Notes ==
Baronetage of Great Britain
Preceded by Parker baronets	Onslow baronets of Althain; 30 October 1797	Succeeded by Knightley baronets
