= Sir Richard Onslow, 1st Baronet =

Royal Navy Admiral (1741–1817)

Admiral Sir Richard Onslow GCB Bt
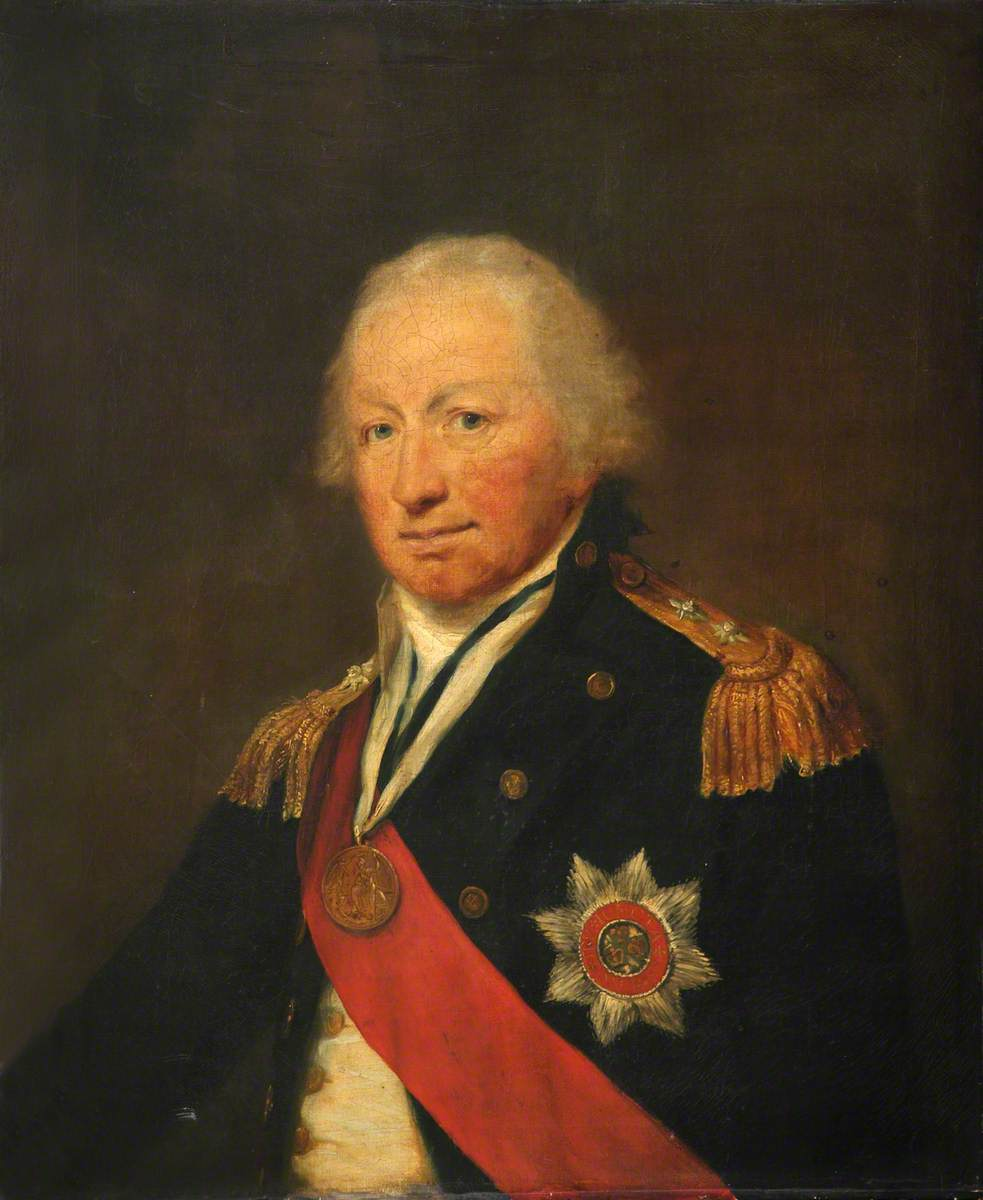
- Portrait by Thomas Phillips
- Born: 23 June 1741; England
- Died: 27 December 1817 (aged 76); Southampton, England
- Relatives: Richard Onslow (father); Matthew Michell (father-in-law)
- Military career
- Allegiance: Great Britain; United Kingdom
- Branch: Royal Navy
- Service years: c.1758–1817
- Rank: Admiral
- Commands: HMS Martin; HMS Humber; HMS Phoenix; HMS Aquilon; HMS Diana; HMS Achilles; HMS St Albans; HMS Bellona; HMS Triumph; HMS Magnificent; Plymouth Command
- Conflicts: Seven Years' War; Battle of Pondicherry; American War of Independence; Battle of St. Lucia; Battle of Cape Spartel; French Revolutionary Wars; Battle of Camperdown

Admiral Sir Richard Onslow, 1st Baronet, GCB (23 June 1741 – 27 December 1817) was a Royal Navy officer who served in the French Revolutionary and Napoleonic Wars.

== Naval career ==
He was the younger son of Lt-Gen. Richard Onslow and his wife Pooley, daughter of Charles Walton. Onslow's uncle was Arthur Onslow, Speaker of the House of Commons, and he enjoyed considerable interest as he rapidly rose through the Navy.

He was made fourth lieutenant of the Sunderland on 17 December 1758 by V-Adm. George Pocock, fifth lieutenant of the Grafton on 3 March 1759, and fourth lieutenant of Pocock's flagship, the Yarmouth on 17 March 1760, upon which he returned to England.

Onslow became commander of the Martin on 11 February 1761, cruising in the Skagerrak until his promotion to captain of the Humber on 14 April 1762. He joined the Humber in June, but she was wrecked off Flamborough Head while returning from the Baltic in September. Onslow was court-martialed for her loss, but was acquitted, the pilot being blamed for the wreck. On 29 November 1762, he was appointed to command the Phoenix.

Onslow did not receive another command until 31 October 1776, when he was appointed to the St Albans. He took a convoy to New York City in April 1777 and joined Lord Howe in time for the repulse of d'Estaing on 22 July 1777 at Sandy Hook. Onslow sailed for the West Indies on 4 November 1778 with Commodore Hotham, and took part in the capture of Saint Lucia and its defense against d'Estaing that December at the Cul-de-Sac. In August 1779, he brought a convoy from St Kitts to Spithead.

He was placed in command of the Bellona, in the Channel Fleet under Admiral Francis Geary, in February 1780, and captured the Dutch 54-gun ship Prinses Carolina on 30 December 1780. Onslow took part in the Relief of Gibraltar under Admiral Darby in April 1781, and again under Howe in October 1782. The Bellona captured La Solitaire in the West Indies before Onslow returned home and took half-pay in June 1783.

In early 1789, he was appointed to command the Magnificent at Portsmouth, but was out of employment again in September 1791. He was promoted rear-admiral of the white on 1 February 1793 and vice-admiral on 4 July 1794. In 1796, he was made port admiral at Portsmouth, and in November, he went aboard the Nassau to act as second-in-command of the North Sea Fleet under Admiral Duncan.

During the Spithead and Nore mutinies, Onslow suppressed a rising aboard the Nassau, and was sent by Duncan to quell the Adamant. When the Nassau refused to sail on 26 May 1797, Onslow moved his flag to the Adamant and until the end of the mutiny, Duncan (in the Venerable) and Onslow maintained the blockade off the Texel alone, making signals to an imaginary fleet over the horizon. Onslow moved his flag again to the Monarch on 25 July 1797, and it was aboard her that he took part in the Battle of Camperdown on 11 October 1797. His flag captain, Edward O'Bryen, supposedly warned him that the Dutch ships were too close together to get between, to which Onslow replied "The Monarch will make a passage." Indeed, Monarch was the first to break the Dutch line and attack the Jupiter of 72 guns, flagship of Vice-Admiral Reyntjes, who subsequently surrendered to Onslow. The victory was captured by the artist Thomas Rowlandson, a friend of Onslow's brother-in-law, Matthew Michell, in the painting "Glorious Defeat of the Dutch Navy Octr 10 1797, by Admirals Lord Duncan and Sir Richard Onslow, with a View Drawn on the Spot of the Six Dutch Line of Battle Ships Captured and Brought into Yarmouth".

For his exertions at Camperdown, Onslow was created a baronet and presented with the Freedom of the City of London. He became Commander-in-Chief, Plymouth in 1796.

He went on sick leave on 10 December 1798 and retired as Commander-in-Chief, Plymouth a few weeks later. He was promoted Admiral of the Red on 9 November 1805 and received the GCB in 1815. He died on 27 December 1817 at Southampton aged 76 years.

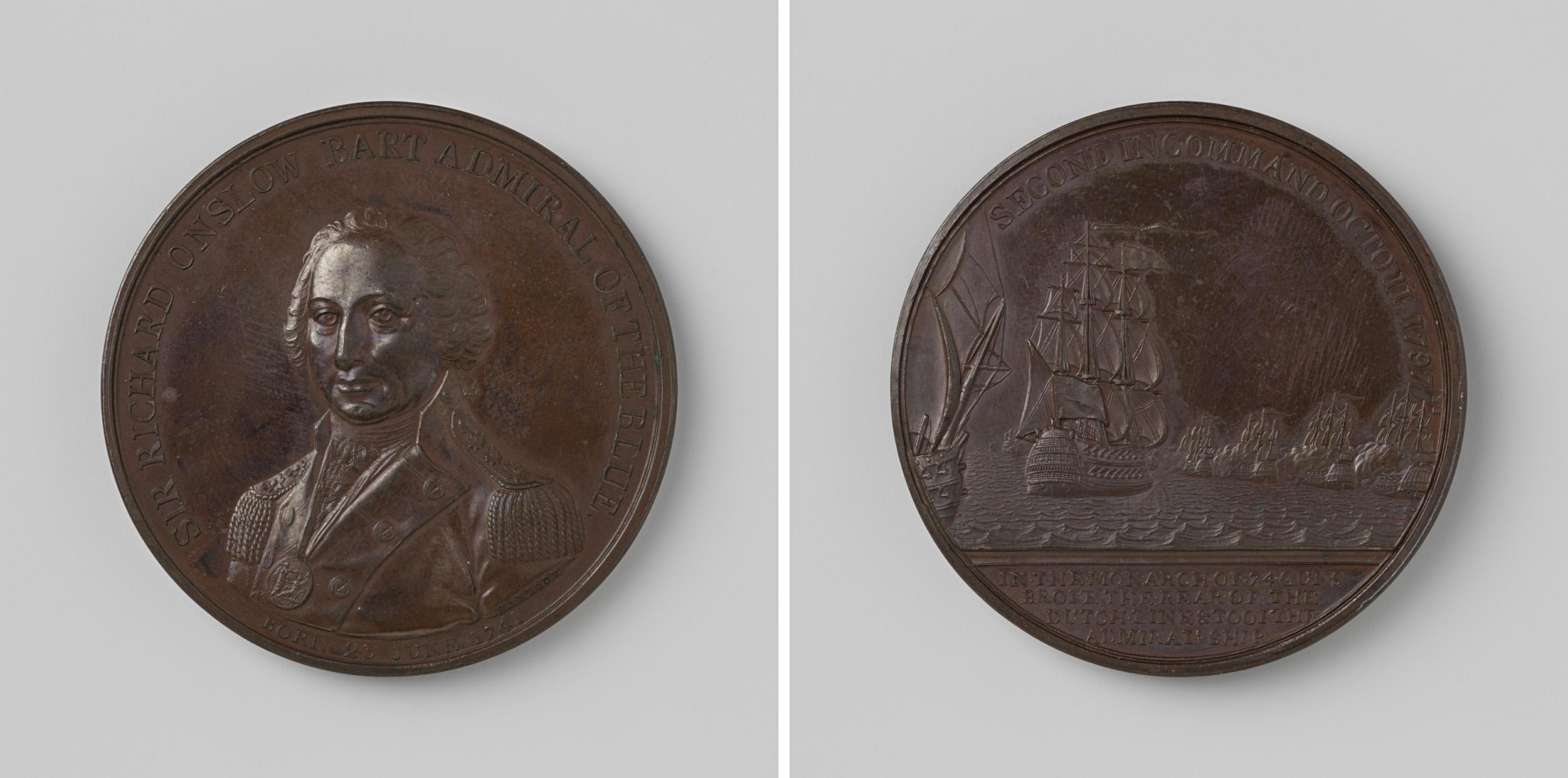
A medal, struck in Birmingham to commemorate Camperdown

== Family ==
In 1765, Onslow, known for his conviviality, was a founder of the Navy Society dining club. On 18 January 1766, he was appointed to command the frigate Aquilon in the Mediterranean, which he did until 1769, and from 12 October 1770, commanded the Diana in the West Indies. Admiral Rodney gave him command of Achilles on 18 January 1773, in which he returned to England, where he acquired an estate and married Anne, daughter of Commodore Matthew Michell of Chitterne, Wiltshire. They had five sons and four daughters:

- Fanny Onslow (1775–1844), married V-Adm. Sir Hyde Parker (1739–1807) in 1800 and had two daughters and one son
- George Cranley Onslow (died in infancy)
- Roger Onslow (died in infancy)
- Matthew Richard Onslow (1781–1808), married Sarah Seton in 1805 and had two daughters
- Anne Onslow (1783–1853), married Francis Lake, 2nd Viscount Lake (1772–1836) in 1833; married Henry Gritton in 1837
- Sir Henry Onslow, 2nd Baronet (1784–1853), married Caroline Bond and had four daughters and five sons
- Elizabeth Onslow (1788–1861), married Robert Lewis (1793–1840) and had five daughters and two sons
- Harriet Onslow (1791–1860), married James Norman Creighton (1786–1838) and had two daughters and one son
- Capt. John James Onslow (1796–1856), married Lavinia Dinning (1796–1871) and had four sons and two daughters

Onslow's widow, Dame Anne, died of influenza at Grand Parade, Brighton, on 31 January 1837 aged 85 year. She was buried with her granddaughter at St Nicholas church northern burial ground, Brighton. A note found after her death and addressed to her son, Sir Henry Onslow, contained the following message: "When I am no more, I hope I am going to a world of comfort after all the sorrows I have experienced in this."

Military offices
Preceded by Sir Richard King	Commander-in-Chief, Plymouth; 1796–1799	Succeeded by Sir Thomas Pasley
Baronetage of Great Britain
New creation	Baronet (of Althain); 1797–1817	Succeeded by Henry Onslow
