= Sir Charles Thompson, 1st Baronet =

Vice-Admiral Sir Charles Thompson Bt
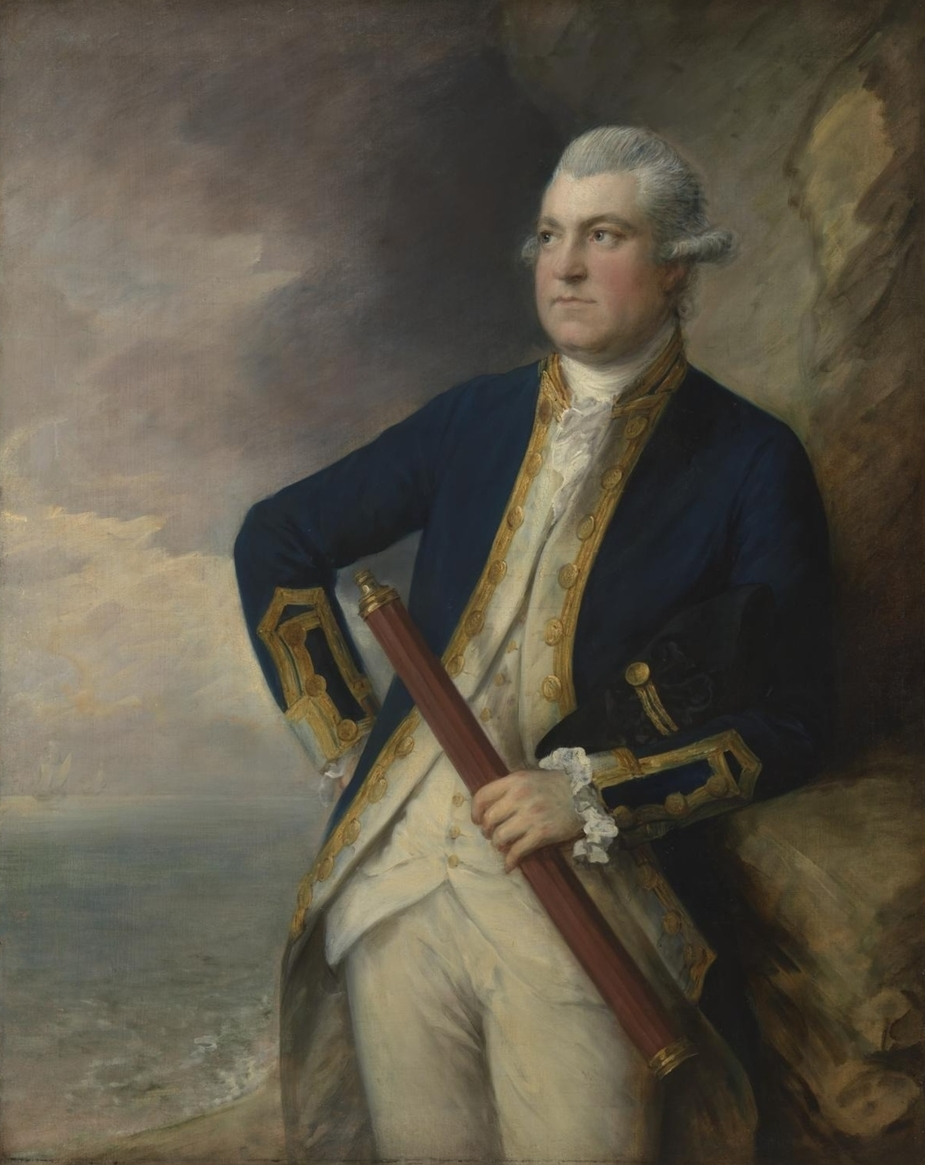
- Portrait by Thomas Gainsborough, 1774
- Born: c. 1740
- Died: 17 March 1799 (aged 58–59); Fareham, Hampshire
- Relatives: Sir Norborne Thompson, 2nd Baronet; Sir Henry Thompson, 3rd Baronet
- Military career
- Allegiance: Great Britain
- Branch: Royal Navy
- Service years: 1755–1799
- Rank: Vice-Admiral of the Blue
- Commands: HMS Senegal; HMS Mermaid; HMS Chatham; HMS Crescent; HMS Boreas; HMS Alcide; HMS Edgar; HMS Elephant; HMS Vengeance
- Conflicts: Seven Years' War; Raid on Le Havre; American War of Independence; Battle of Grenada; Battle of Fort Royal; Battle of the Chesapeake; Battle of Saint Kitts; Battle of the Saintes; French Revolutionary Wars; Battle of Martinique (1794); Invasion of Guadeloupe (1794); Battle of Cape St. Vincent (1797)

Vice-Admiral of the Blue Sir Charles Thompson, 1st Baronet (c. 1740 – 17 March 1799) was a Royal Navy officer and politician who served in the Seven Years' War, American War of Independence and French Revolutionary Wars. He was second in command at the Battle of Cape St. Vincent, where Thompson's disregard for Sir John Jervis' signal to tack to counter a Spanish attack nearly lost the battle and began an enmity between the two men that combined with poor health eventually led to the end of Thompson's active career. From 1796 to 1799 he was also MP for Monmouth.

== Family ==
Thompson's father is thought to have been Norborne Berkeley, later Baron Botetourt, of Stoke Gifford, Gloucestershire, governor of Virginia, his mother was Margaret Thompson. (Charles was illegitimate). He, his mother and sister Elizabeth Thompson were all beneficiaries in Norborne Berkeley's will. He married Jane, daughter and heiress of Robert Selby of Bonnington, near Edinburgh in 1783, by whom he had issue: Norborne Charles (1785–1826) who joined the navy but was court martialed for insubordination; Charles Robert (1788–1801) who died at sea aged 13; Elizabeth (1790-, Jane (1794–1815) who died in Portugal aged 21, and is buried at the English Cemetery, Lisbon; and Henry (1796–1868).

== Naval service ==
Thompson's first service at sea was on a merchantman, but he soon joined the Royal Navy on HMS Nassau in 1755, just before the outbreak of the Seven Years' War. In the following five years he served on that ship then on HMS Prince Frederick and (under Captain Samuel Barrington) HMS Achilles. He passed his examination for lieutenant in 1760 and was commissioned as the fifth lieutenant of HMS Arrogant on 16 January 1761, serving on her in the Channel Fleet and then in the Mediterranean. When peace came, this ship was paid off and Thompson transferred to the sloop HMS Cygnet, serving on her on the North American station from August 1763 to her paying-off in July 1768 in South Carolina (with no transport provided to get her officers back to England, though they were later paid £39 0s. 6d each for the journey).

Thompson was back in North America as HMS Salisbury's first lieutenant from May 1770, and there Commodore James Gambier promoted him to commander in February 1771, commanding the sloop HMS Senegal and then (after 3 months) appointed acting captain of HMS Mermaid. He took the later ship back to England in December 1771 and, though his acting captaincy was not confirmed by the British Admiralty, they did on 7 March 1772 promote him to post-captain, commanding HMS Chatham.

=== Service in the West Indies ===
Thompson sailed to the West Indies commanding HMS Chatham, the flagship of Vice-admiral William Parry, and later moved to the frigate HMS Crescent. He returned to England in 1774, and then went back to the West Indies in command of HMS Boreas in early 1776 (capturing the 20-gun French ship Le Compas). He accompanied a merchant convoy to England in October 1777, before yet again going out to the West Indies in 1780. Sir John Laforey was appointed commissioner of the shipyard at Antigua in 1780, but Thompson refused to recognize this authority, leading to a long feud. In the Caribbean, Thompson was moved by Sir George Rodney to the 74-gun HMS Alcide, commanding her throughout the American War of Independence, including at the battles of the Chesapeake and Saint Kitts under Sir Samuel Hood. In April 1782, Thompson was present in the rear division at the Battle of the Saintes, Rodney's decisive victory over the French in the Caribbean. He sailed Alcide back to England at the end of the war.

== Later service ==
In 1787 Thompson commanded HMS Edgar at Portsmouth, and in 1790 HMS Elephant (during the crisis of the Spanish armament). When the War of the First Coalition broke out in 1793 he was put in command of HMS Vengeance, as part of Sir John Jervis and Lieutenant-General Sir Charles Grey's expedition against France's West Indian possessions, participating in the capture of Martinique (directing the boat attacks on Fort Royal) and Guadeloupe as a commodore. Also during this time in the Indies, Laforey and Thompson's feud reignited over Laforey conduct as commander-in-chief at the Leeward Islands, thus providing an excuse for First Lord of the Admiralty George Spencer, 2nd Earl Spencer to recall Laforey but causing alarm amidst the other Admiralty commissioners; Sir Charles Middleton resigned over the affair. In the course of promotions through seniority, Thompson was promoted to Rear-Admiral of the Blue on 12 April 1794, and sailed back to England the following year (with HMS Vanguard as his flagship) to be made Vice-Admiral of the Blue on 1 June 1795 (with his flag in HMS London).

=== Mediterranean service ===
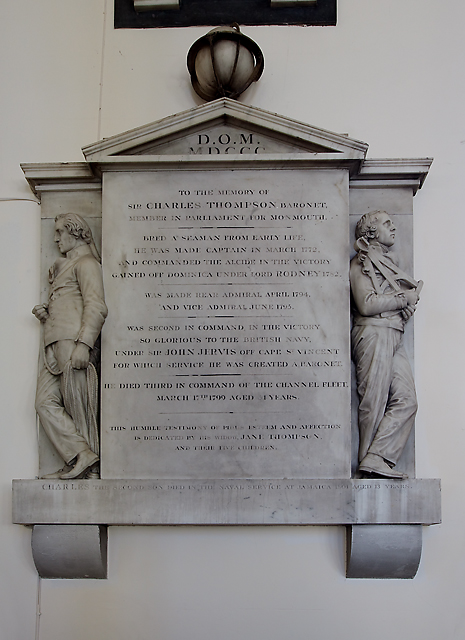
Thompson's monument at Fareham

Thompson was next put in command of a detached squadron as part of the British blockade of Brest, before being transferred to HMS Britannia, in which he served in the Mediterranean. In Britannia he acted as second in command at the Battle of Cape St. Vincent, disregarding Jervis's signal to tack to counter a Spanish attacking move and thus nearly losing the battle. This angered Jervis but he chose not to bring the issue into the public sphere, and so later that year Thompson's and Jervis's contribution to the battle were rewarded with a baronetcy and an earldom respectively whilst still on station. Continuing on the station for a time, Thompson's next disagreement with Jervis (over the latter's insistence on hanging two mutineers on the Sabbath on Sunday 9 July 1797) gave Jervis sufficient justification to insist that the Admiralty recall Thompson. After Thompson's death, Jervis wrote of him as a ‘gallant man, but the most timid officer’, and drew attention to his having ‘the manner of a rough seaman’ which Thompson cultivated by his habit of dressing casually in a sailor's frock and straw hat.

On his recall, Thompson was then given a post in the Brest-blockade fleet which he held until 1798 despite failing health, his health eventually forcing him to strike his flag and return to England early in 1799, where he died later that year. He is buried in Holy Trinity Church in Fareham with a Monument sculpted by John Flaxman RA.

== Political office ==
Thompson was elected MP for Monmouth in 1796 and held the seat until 1799 although he did not have a significant attendance in parliament.

== Sources ==
- J. Ralfe, The naval biography of Great Britain, 2 (1828), 3
- W. James, The naval history of Great Britain, from the declaration of war by France in 1793 to the accession of George IV, [8th edn], 6 vols. (1902)
- D. Syrett and R. L. DiNardo, The commissioned sea officers of the Royal Navy, 1660–1815, rev. edn, Occasional Publications of the Navy RS, 1 (1994)
- C. G. Pitcairn Jones, ‘List of commissioned sea officers of the Royal Navy, 1660–1815’, NMM, NMM 359 (42) (083.81) GRE
- A. Aspinall, ‘Thompson, Charles’, HoP, Commons, 1790–1820
- Debrett's Peerage (1834)
- The dispatches and letters of Vice-Admiral Lord Viscount Nelson, ed. Nicholas Harris Nicolas, 7 vols. (1844–6); repr. (1997–8), vol. 2
- M. A. J. Palmer, ‘Sir John's victory: the battle of Cape St Vincent reconsidered’, Mariner's Mirror, 77 (1991), 31–46
- Colin White, Nelson's year of destiny: Cape St Vincent and Santa Cruz de Tenerife (1998)

Parliament of Great Britain
Preceded by Charles Bragge	Member of Parliament for Monmouth; 1796–1799	Succeeded by Lord Edward Somerset
Peerage of Great Britain
New creation	Baronet (of Virkees); 1797–1799	Succeeded by Norborne Charles Thompson
