= Sir Thomas Brooke-Pechell, 2nd Baronet =

British politician and baronet

Major-General Sir Thomas Brook-Pechell Bt
- Escutcheon of the Pechell baronets of Paglesham

Gentleman Usher to Queen Charlotte
- In office 1787–1818

Member of Parliament for Downton
- In office 26 April 1813 – 1818 Serving with Edward Golding
- Preceded by: Charles Henry Bouverie; Sir Thomas Plumer
- Succeeded by: Viscount Folkestone; William Scott
- In office 22 February 1819 – 1826 Serving with Bartholomew Bouverie
- Preceded by: Viscount Folkestone; William Scott
- Succeeded by: Robert Southey; Thomas Grimston Estcourt

Personal details
- Born: 23 January 1753
- Died: 17/18 June 1826 (aged 73)

Sir Thomas Brook-Pechell, 2nd Baronet (23 January 1753–17/18 June 1826 was a British politician who served as the Member of Parliament for Downton from 1813 to 1818, and again from 1819 to 1826.

He married Charlotte Clavering, the second daughter of Sir John Clavering 28 April 1783.

He served as the Gentleman Usher to Queen Consort Charlotte of Mecklenburg-Strelitz from 1787 to 1818.

== Baronet ==
He became Baronet in 1800 upon the death of his father, Sir Paul Pechell, 1st Baronet, and was succeeded by his son, Sir Samuel Brook-Pechell, 3rd Baronet, upon his death in 1826.
