= Knightley baronets of Fawsley (1798) =

Escutcheon of the Knightley baronets of Fawsley

The Knightley baronetcy, of Fawsley in the County of Northampton, was created in the Baronetage of Great Britain on 2 February 1798 for John Knightley, son of Valentine Knightley (1718–1754), Member of Parliament for Northampton between 1748 and 1754. There was a special remainder to the male issue of his deceased younger brother the Rev. Charles Knightley.

He was succeeded according to the special remainder by his nephew, the 2nd Baronet, who sat as Member of Parliament for Northamptonshire South from 1834 to 1852. On his death the title passed to his son, the 3rd Baronet. He also represented Northamptonshire South in the House of Commons, from 1852 to 1892. On 23 August 1892 he was raised to the Peerage of the United Kingdom as Baron Knightley, of Fawsley in the County of Northampton.

Lord Knightley was childless and on his death in 1895 the barony became extinct. He was succeeded in the baronetcy by his first cousin, the 4th Baronet, the son of the Rev. Henry Knightley (1786–1813), younger brother of the 2nd Baronet. He died unmarried and was succeeded by his nephew, 5th Baronet. He was the son of the Rev. Henry Charles Knightley (1813–1884), younger brother of the 4th Baronet.

The 5th Baronet was a County Alderman, member of the Northamptonshire County Council. He was childless and on his death the title passed to his younger brother, the 6th Baronet, a clergyman. He was also childless and on his death in 1938 the baronetcy became extinct.

== Knightley baronets, of Fawsley (1798) ==
- Sir John Knightley, 1st Baronet (1747–1812)
- Sir Charles Knightley, 2nd Baronet (1781–1864)
- Sir Rainald Knightley, 3rd Baronet (1819–1895) (created Baron Knightley in 1892)

== Barons Knightley (1892) ==
- Rainald Knightley, 1st Baron Knightley (1819–1895)

== Knightley baronets, of Fawsley (1798); reverted ==
- Sir Valentine Knightley, 4th Baronet (1812–1898)
- Sir Charles Valentine Knightley, 5th Baronet (1853–1932)
- Sir Henry Francis Knightley, 6th Baronet (1854–1938), left no heir.

== Notes ==
Baronetage of Great Britain
Preceded by Onslow baronets	Knightley baronets of Fawsley; 2 February 1798	Succeeded by Hay baronets
