= Sir Henry Thompson, 3rd Baronet =

British baronet (1796–1868)

The Reverend Sir Henry Thompson, 3rd Baronet Thompson of Virkees (5 November 1796 – 1 July 1868) was the third son of Sir Charles Thompson, 1st Baronet, and Jane Selby. He succeeded to the baronetcy after his eldest brother the 2nd Baronet died without issue in 1826. On 26 February 1826 he married Hannah Jean Grey, third daughter of Sir George Grey, 1st Baronet, of Falloden, KCB, Commissioner at Portsmouth Dockyard, and Mary Whitbread, daughter of Samuel Whitbread. Sir George Grey was the third son of Charles Grey, 1st Earl Grey, and younger brother of Charles Grey, 2nd Earl Grey.

Sir Henry and Hannah Jean Grey had one daughter, Hannah Jane Thompson (1829–1899), born in Ryde, Isle of Wight, but his wife died shortly after childbirth. His daughter married Henry Thomas Murdoch Kirby, vicar of Mayfield, Sussex, in 1847 at Frant, Sussex. One of their twelve children was Admiral Francis George Kirby (1854–1951), Captain of HMS Phaeton.

In October 1835, Sir Henry married Miss Emily Frances Anne Leeke, daughter of Ralph Leeke of Longford Hall, Shifnal, Shropshire, in Brighton. They had children—Frances Anna (born 1837), Henry Charles (born 1843), Ralph Harvey (1846–1846) and Caroline Eleanor (1848–1900).

Sir Henry was, during his life, Curate in charge at Holy Trinity Church, Bembridge, Isle of Wight; Rector of the Church of Holy Trinity, Fareham, Hampshire (the building of which had been paid for by himself and his mother, Lady Jane Thompson), and in 1845 he was given the living of Frant, Sussex, by the Earl of Abergavenny. He died in Chichester in 1868 and was buried at Holy Trinity Church, Fareham.

With no surviving sons, the baronetcy became extinct on his death in 1868.

Peerage of Great Britain
Preceded by Norborne Thompson	Baronet (of Virkees); 1844–1869	Extinct
