= Dalrymple-Hay baronets =

Title in the Baronetage of Great Britain

Escutcheon of the Dalrymple-Hay baronets of Park Place

The Dalrymple-Hay baronetcy, of Park Place, Glenluce in the County of Wigtown, is a title in the Baronetage of Great Britain. It was created on 27 April 1798 for Colonel John Dalrymple-Hay. Born John Dalrymple, he was the husband of Susan, daughter of Sir Thomas Hay, 3rd Baronet, of Park (see Hay baronets for earlier history of this title). On inheriting his father-in-law's estates in 1794, on the death of the 4th Baronet of the 1663 creation, he assumed by Royal licence the additional surname of Hay.

The 3rd Baronet (who succeeded his father), was an Admiral in the Royal Navy and Member of Parliament for Wakefield from 1862 to 1865, for Stamford 1866 to 1880, and for 1880 to 1885. His third and youngest son, the 5th Baronet, who succeeded his childless elder brother, was a Clerk in the Foreign Office from 1887 to 1895 and in the Privy Council Office from 1895 to 1928. On his death the line of the 3rd Baronet failed.

The 6th Baronet was the eldest son of Brian George Rowland Dalrymple-Hay (1898–1943), a Colonel in the Indian Cavalry: who was son of George Houston Dalrymple-Hay (1865–1948), fifth son of George James Dalrymple-Hay (1828–1891), a Colonel in the Bengal Staff Corps, second son of the 2nd Baronet (and eldest son of his second marriage). As of 2026 the title is held by the 7th Baronet's son, the 8th Baronet.

== Dalrymple-Hay baronets, of Park Place (1798) ==
- Sir John Dalrymple-Hay, 1st Baronet (1746–1812)
- Sir James Dalrymple-Hay, 2nd Baronet (1789–1861)
- Sir John Charles Dalrymple-Hay, 3rd Baronet (1821–1912)
- Sir William Archibald Dalrymple-Hay, 4th Baronet (1851–1929)
- Sir Charles John Dalrymple-Hay, 5th Baronet (1865–1952)
- Sir James Brian Dalrymple-Hay, 6th Baronet (19 January 1928– 21 September 2005)
- Sir John Hugh Dalrymple-Hay, 7th Baronet (16 December 1929– 20 January 2009)
- Sir Malcolm John Robert Dalrymple-Hay, 8th Baronet (born 1966), a surgeon based in Plymouth, Devon.

The heir presumptive to the baronetcy is Ronald George Inglis Dalrymple-Hay (born 1933), the current holder's uncle.

== Extended family ==
- James Reginald Maitland Dalrymple-Hay (1858–1924), eldest son of Colonel George James Dalrymple-Hay, second son of the 2nd Baronet, was a Brigadier-General of the Jamaica Forces from 1910 to 1914.
- Sir Harley Dalrymple-Hay (1861–1940), third son of George James Dalrymple-Hay above, was a civil engineer.

== Notes ==
Baronetage of Great Britain
Preceded by Knightley baronets	Hay baronets of Park Place; 7 April 1798	Succeeded by Anderson baronets
