= Sir Henry Onslow, 2nd Baronet =

British peer

Sir Henry Onslow, 2nd Baronet (23 April 1784 – 13 September 1853) was a British baronet and son of Sir Richard Onslow, 1st Baronet, whose baronetcy he succeeded on 27 December 1817. He was also Captain in the Royal Artillery and the 10th Foot. He received promotion to the rank of captain in the artillery on 20 February 1814 and retired on half pay on 7 June 1819.

Onslow was born at Bramdean, Hampshire on 23 April 1784, the seventh and youngest child of Admiral Sir Richard Onslow.

Onslow married Caroline Bond and had four daughters and five sons, including the third and fourth Baronets. He died on 13 September 1853 at Steyning, West Sussex, and is buried in the churchyard at All Saints parish church, Chitterne, Wiltshire.

Baronetage of Great Britain
Preceded by Richard Onslow	Baronet (of Althain); 1817–1853	Succeeded by Henry Onslow
