= Harburn =

Harburn is a surname. Notable people with the surname include:

- Bill Harburn (1923–1970), British footballer
- Colin Harburn (1938–2022), Australian cricketer
- Peter Harburn (1931–2010), British footballer

== See also ==
- Harburn, West Lothian
- Sir William Parker, 1st Baronet, of Harburn
