= Paul Pechell =

British army officer (1724 – 1800)

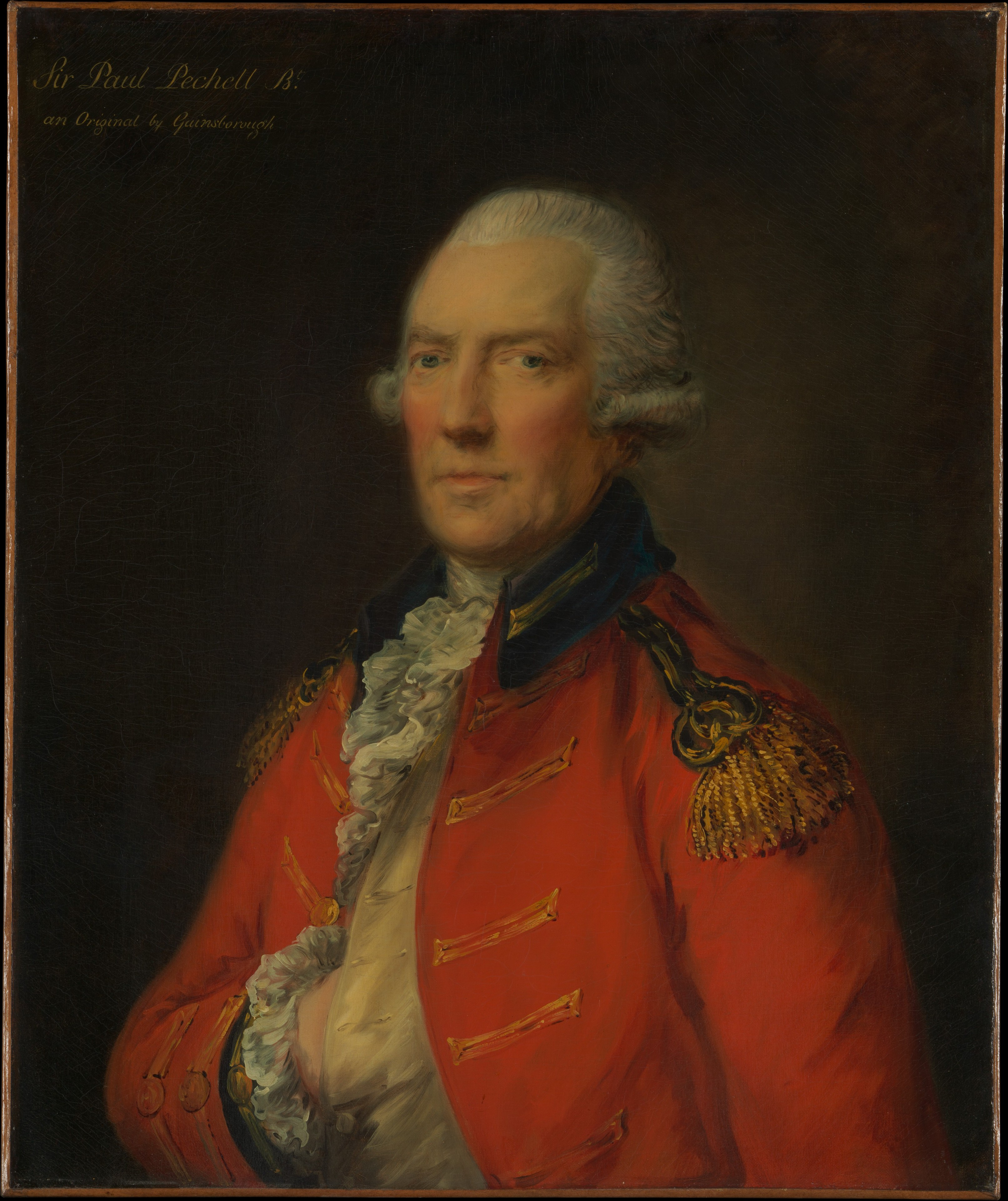
Thomas Gainsborough's portrait of Lieutenant Colonel Paul Pechell - at The Metropolitan Museum of Art, New York

Sir Paul Pechell, 1st Baronet (12 November 1724 – 13 January 1800), was a British army officer and descendant of minor Huguenot nobility of Languedoc (originally de Péchels). He was born in Owenstown, county Kildare, the son of army officer Jacob Pechell and his wife Jane Boyd. His grandfather had been ejected from France following the Revocation of the Edict of Nantes and ultimately settled in Ireland.

Pechell entered the army as cornet-en-seconde in the Royal Regiment of Dragoons in 1744, and was promoted captain in Fleming's Regiment of Foot in 1746. Wounded at Laffeld in 1747 during the War of the Austrian Succession, he received 'the greatest commendation' from the Duke of Cumberland.

In 1751, Pechell was gazetted captain in the 3rd Dragoon Guards, and in the following spring his regiment escorted George II to Harwich to embark for Hanover. For the next three years the regiment was on coast duty suppressing smuggling in Suffolk, Essex, and Devon and patrolling against highway robbers. Pechell was gazetted guidon in the Second Troop of Horse Grenadier Guards in 1754, and was promoted to captain in 1755, major in 1759, and lieutenant-colonel in 1762. He retired from the army in 1768, receiving a lump sum for his commission.

He married Mary Brooke in 1752. She was the only daughter and heir of Thomas Brooke, of Paglesham, Essex; they had two sons and five daughters. Pechell was created a baronet on 1 March 1797, and died in 1800. His eldest son, Major-General Sir Thomas Brooke-Pechell, 2nd Baronet (1753–1826), was father of Rear-Admiral Sir Samuel John Brooke-Pechell, 3rd Baronet (1785–1849), and of Admiral Sir George Richard Brooke-Pechell, 4th Baronet (1789–1860).

== See also ==
- Pechell baronets

Baronetage of Great Britain
New creation	Baronet (of Paglesham); 1797–1800	Succeeded by Major-General; Thomas Brooke-Pechell
