= Pachil =

Pachil پاچيل
- Village
- Location within Iran
- Coordinates: 28°02′00″N 57°12′00″E
- Country: Iran
- Province: Kerman
- County: Faryab
- Bakhsh: Central
- Rural District: Golashkerd

Population (2006)
  - Total: 20
- Time zone: UTC+3:30 (IRST)
  - Summer (DST): UTC+4:30 (IRDT)

Pachil (Persian: پاچيل, also Romanized as Pāchīl) is a village in Golashkerd Rural District, in the Central District of Faryab County, Kerman Province, Iran. At the 2006 census, its population was 20, in 4 families.
