= Georgina Dobrée =

English clarinettist (1930 - 2008)

- Born: 8 January 1930; Maida Vale, London, England
- Died: 27 April 2008 (aged 78); Stevenage, Hertfordshire, England
- Occupation: Clarinettist
- Years active: 1951–1999

Georgina Dobrée (8 January 1930 – 27 April 2008) was an English clarinettist. She firstly played the violin and piano in her childhood years but dropped the violin and later took up the clarinet as a second instrument while studying in London. She began her professional musical career in 1951 and continued up until 1999 around several locations. Her career also saw her set up her own record company and undertake a professorship role at the Royal Academy of Music.

== Biography ==
=== Early life ===
Dobrée was born at 74 Sutherland Avenue in Maida Vale in London on 8 January 1930. She was the only child of the literary scholar Bonamy Dobrée, and his wife, the author and poet Gladys May Mabel (Valentine), née Brooke-Pechell. Dobrée was first raised in Mendham Priory in Norfolk and later moved to Earls Colne in Essex. She began studying the violin and piano at an early age. Dobrée was evacuated to the United States when World War II broke out and stayed with friends of her parents. While studying at the Peabody Conservatory in Baltimore in Maryland, she stopped playing the violin for a clarinet she found by chance at her new home. Dobrée immediately discovered a natural liking for the instrument.

=== Career ===
She returned to London after the war ended and spent three years studying the piano under Harold Craxton at the Royal Academy of Music in London. Dobrée took the clarinet as a second instrument and studied it George Anderson. She won a scholarship offered by the government of France to study with the principal clarinettist of the Orchestre National de France Gaston Hamelin in 1949. Dobrée's affinity for French music is possibly explained on how aware she was of her French Huguenot ancestry from her parents. She felt comfortable with playing French instruments in the French style but was required to switch instruments and adopt the more contemporary German sound upon returning to England.

In the 1951 Hoveringham Festival, Dobrée performed in association with the Griller Quartet led by the violinist Sidney Griller, and in the next year, she made her debut broadcast on the BBC Third Programme at the same festival. She flew to Darmstadt to attend the International New Music Holiday Course in the summer of 1953 and took first prize in a competition for a new contemporary music prize. Dobréet returned to London in the autumn to partake in a series of lectures and recitals on twelve-tone music at London's contemporary music centre of the era, Morley College. Throughout the 1950s, her concerts in London featured regular recitals for the Society for the Promotion of New Music and regularly appeared alongside the McNaughton New Music Group.

Dobrée had been playing the basset horn in 1952 and started to appear with the instrument in her performances half a decade later. She reverted to performing with French instruments and amassed a total of six basset horns of which she carried in a special case for easy transportation while travelling by plane. It was when she was performing the sonata for piano and basset horn by Franz Danzi, and with the clarinettist Thea King, the Mendelssohn Konzertstücke op. 114. At the invitation of King, Dobrée became a member of the Portia Wind Ensemble and founded the Chantry Ensemble with the flautist William Bennett. Gordon Jacob's Miniature Suite for clarinet and viola was among the many works written for Dobrée. Her last appearance in the Darmstadt Festival came in 1964.

In 1967 she was made a professor of clarinet at the Royal Academy of Music in London. Around the same period, Dobrée began researching some neglected works of the 18th and 19th centuries and her editions of some of the works were published from 1968 onward. From an EMI recording of Johann Melchior Molter's concertos for D clarinet that same year, she set up her own record company, Chantry Records. She and the pianist Alexander Kelly gave a series of concerts in 1973 at Leighton House in Holland Park to celebrate the pairing 21st anniversary of the beginning of their partnership. Dobrée travelled to the United States in 1978 and gave performances at the National Gallery to which the critic for The Washington Times Joan Reinthaler was complementary towards.

=== Later years ===
The increasing demands of touring and lecturing gradually made her teaching role impractical and gave up her professorship in 1986. Dobrée did however continue lessons, masterclasses and workshops on an individual basis. She continued to expand the contemporary repertoire for the basset horn throughout the 1990s and commissioned new works from several British and Eastern European composers. In 1995, Dobrée recorded a collection entitled This Green Tide on a work conducted by John Mayer. To ensure her works would remain available, they were transferred to Emerson Edition in 1999. That same year, Dobrée finished one of her last editions, a collection of four French clarinet works that was published by Kevin Mayhew. She suffered from Alzheimer's disease in her later years and moved to a nursing home in Hitchin in Hertfordshire. Dobrée fractured her left femur in early 2008 and underwent surgery. She later died of a chest infection at the Lister Hospital in Stevenage on 27 April 2008. Dobrée was not married. She received a private funeral.
