= Thompson baronets of Walton-on-the-Hill (1963) =

The Thompson baronetcy, of Walton-on-the-Hill in the City of Liverpool, was created in the Baronetage of the United Kingdom on 29 January 1963 for the Conservative politician Kenneth Thompson. He was Chairman of the Merseyside County Council and represented Liverpool, Walton in the House of Commons. As of 2026 the title is held by his son, the second Baronet, who succeeded in 1984.

== Thompson baronets, of Walton-on-the-Hill (1963) ==
- Sir Kenneth Pugh Thompson, 1st Baronet (1909–1984)
- Sir Paul Anthony Thompson, 2nd Baronet (born 1939)

The heir apparent to the baronetcy is Richard Kenneth Spencer Thompson (born 1976), eldest son of the 2nd Baronet.

Coat of arms of Thompson baronets of Walton-on-the-Hill

Crest
A demi figure affronty representing Neptune wreathed about the middle with laver proper the mantle gules clasped and crowned with an antique crown Or supporting in the dexter hand a trident sable and in the sinister a spear proper.
Escutcheon
Per fess dancetty argent and sable of two upward one downward points each ending in a cross potent three swans one in chief and two in base counterchanged .
Motto
Loyalty
