= Onslow baronets =

Set index for Onslow baronets

There have been two baronetcies created for the Onslow family, one in the Baronetage of England and one in the Baronetage of Great Britain. As of 2026 both titles are extant.

- Onslow baronets of West Clandon (1674): see Earl of Onslow
- Onslow baronets of Althain (1797)
