= Bonamy Dobrée =

British academic (1891 - 1974)

Bonamy Dobrée (2 February 1891 – 3 September 1974) was a British academic and Professor of English Literature at the University of Leeds from 1936 to 1955.

Dobrée declared himself a Channel Islander, and was rather proud that both his Bonamy and Dobrée ancestors, bankers, had been mentioned by Thackeray. His father, who had the same name, was born in 1862 and married Violet Gordon Chase. He had two daughters before his son was born, then died at St. Moritz of tuberculosis on 30 August 1891. His grandfather was the Bonamy Dobrée who was Governor of the Bank of England in 1859–1861.

After Haileybury and the Royal Military Academy, Woolwich, Dobrée was commissioned in the Royal Field Artillery in 1910 but resigned in 1913. He rejoined in 1914, serving in France and the Middle East during World War I. In 1920 he took advantage of a tuition discount offered to veterans, taking his BA from Christ's College, Cambridge, in 1921 and his MA in 1924. In 1925 he was appointed lecturer in London, and in 1926 Professor of English at the Egyptian University, Cairo, where he remained until 1929. In 1936 he was appointed Professor of English Literature at the University of Leeds, where he remained until his retirement.

During World War II Dobrée served as a lieutenant-colonel in the ABCA organisation. He delivered the Clark Lectures at Cambridge in 1953, and was an Honorary Doctor of the University of Dijon. After retiring from Leeds he edited the Writers and their Work series of pamphlets for the British Council and the National Book League, and himself authored a pamphlet on Rudyard Kipling. He also lectured as Professor of Literature at Gresham College. He was the Lord Northcliffe Memorial Lecturer in 1963. He died in his Blackheath home.

On 21 November 1913, Dobrée married Gladys May Mabel Brooke-Pechell (after her marriage called Valentine Dobrée; ca. 1893 – 14 May 1974), the daughter of Sir Alexander Brooke-Pechell, 7th Baronet, and had one daughter, Georgina, a well-known clarinetist (1930-2008).

His first book was Restoration Comedy (1925); his largest, published 35 years later, was on the Early Eighteenth Century in the Oxford History of English Literature. His scholarship was focused within these limits; he also wrote a novel, a play, and poetry.

== Sources ==
- "Professor Bonamy Dobrée, English Literature at Leeds", The Times, 4 September 1974, pg. 16
- Descendants of James Bannerman
- "Solomon's Mines" by Geoffrey Hill is dedicated to "Bonamy Dobrée"
- Archival material at University of Leeds Libraries
