= Louisa Emily Dobrée =

French/Irish writer (c.1852-1917)

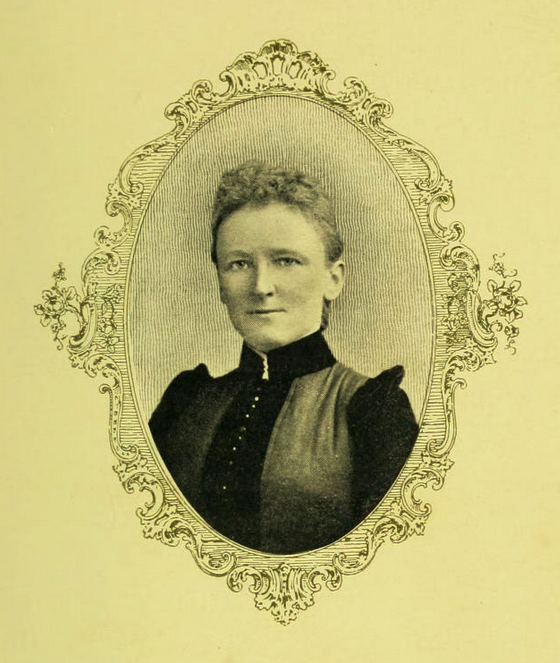
- Photo in A Round Table of the Representative Irish and English Catholic Novelists:, 1897
- Born: c. 1852; Tours, France
- Died: 1917 (aged 64–65)
- Occupation: Writer
- Writing career
- Pen name: L. E. Dobrée
- Language: English
- Period: 1877–1917
- Genres: novels; fugitive articles; short stories; juvenile literature
- Subjects: home nursing; domestic and personal hygiene; etiquette; character sketches; embroidery; natural history

Signature
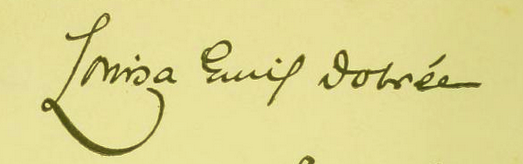

Louisa Emily Dobrée (c. 1852 – 1917) was a French-born Irish Catholic writer. She was born in Tours, France, and her heritage was Irish on her mother’s side and French through her father’s Guernsey family. Dobrée wrote novels, short stories, juvenile literature, and fugitive articles that appeared in various magazines. Her non-fiction works addressed subjects such as home nursing, domestic and personal hygiene, etiquette, character sketches, embroidery, plain work, and natural history. Over the course of her career, she contributed to numerous publications and authored many books for young readers as well as religious and instructional works. She lived in several European countries, including France, Ireland, and the Channel Islands, and spent her later years near London.

== Early life ==
Louisa Emily Dobrée was born in Tours, France, c. 1852. She was of Irish descent on her mother's side, while her father's family, of Guernsey, was originally French.

== Career ==
Dobrée's first story was published when she was nineteen. This was followed by fugitive articles and short stories in magazines. She also wrote books for young people, among which are the following:— Loved into Shape, Dreams and Deeds, Terry, One Talent Only, A Knotless Thread, Underneath the Surface, A Lowly Life with a Lofty Aim, and Turned to Gold, as well as Hugh Templar's motto, Underneath the Surface. A Sark Story, Leon and the Lessons He Learned. A Jersey Story, and Only Johnny Brown. These were published at intervals of sometimes great length.

In 1887, Dobrée was received into the Catholic Church, and her books thereafter included:— A Manual of Home Nursing, Stories on the Sacraments, A Seven-Fold Treasure, Per Parcel Post, A Tug-of War, Stories on the Beatitudes, Beautiful Sewing, and Plain Work, among others. She was on the staff and an occasional contributor to twenty magazines, the subjects on which she wrote upon including home nursing, domestic and personal hygiene, etiquette, character sketches, embroidery, plain work, and natural history.

The scenes of Dobrée's stories were always set in Europe. She lived a great while in the Channel Islands, France, and Ireland, besides having paid visits of long and short duration to Italy, Switzerland, Austria, Belgium, and Germany. Later in life, she lived at Chiswick, near London.

== Selected works ==
- Terry, or Trying to Follow, 1876
- Loved into shape; or, The story of Bob Sanders, 1877
- Dreams and Deeds, 1877
- One Talent Only, 1878
- Hugh Templar's motto, 1879
- "Not useless", 1879
- A Knotless Thread, 1879
- Underneath the Surface. A Sark Story, 1881
- Turned to Gold, 1881
- A Lowly Life with a Lofty Aim, 1881
- A life lesson, 1884
- Only Johnny Brown, 1886
- Leon and the Lessons He Learned. A Jersey Story, 1886
- Kit and His Violin, 1888
- A Manual of Home Nursing, 1889
- Little King I.A Story for the Young ... With Illustrations, Etc, 1890
- Stories of the Seven Sacraments, 1890
- Loved Into Shape; Or, the Story of Bob Sanders, 1891
- A Christmas lesson, 1891
- A lowly life with a lofty aim, 1891
- A Tug-of War, 1891
- A sevenfold treasure : stories on the gifts of the Holy Spirit, 1892
- Winifred's work, 1892
- Per Parcel Post, 1892
- Stories on the Beatitudes, 1894
- A workhouse concert, 1894
- Coals of fire, 1894
- Uncle Luke's legacy, 1894
- Dick's desire, 1894
- Stories on the Rosary. Part I, 1897
- Stories on the Rosary. Part 2, 1898
- Sylvia's Lesson: Extreme Unction, 19??
- The Two Wishes: A Story of Holy Orders, 19??
- Brian Daly: A Story of Holy Communion, 19??
- You Did it Unto Me: Stories on the Corporal Works of Mercy, 1903
- Stories on the Rosary. Part 3, The glorious mysteries, 1904
- Among the saucepans, 1915
- Ever a fighter, 1915
- Driving a bargain, 1915
- Father Carlton's offerings, 1915
- Don Filippo's dream, 1915
- Stories from Italy, 1915
- The Kingdoms of the World, 1917
- Beautiful Sewing
- Plain Work
