= Samuel Pechell =

Royal Navy officer and politician

Rear-Admiral Sir Samuel Pechell Bt CB KCH FRS
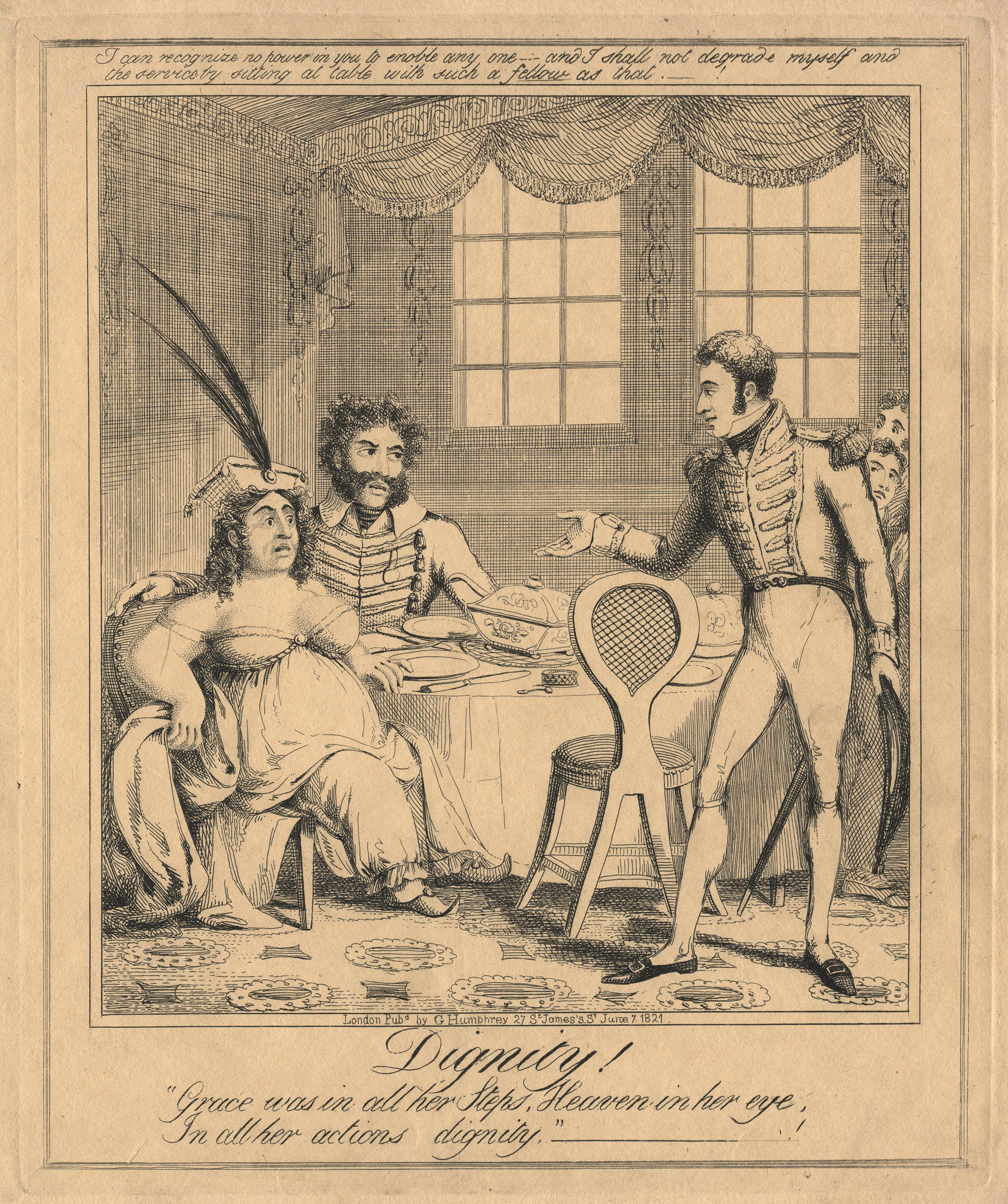
- A political cartoon probably depicting Pechell (left) defending the Prince of Wales's honour to Caroline of Brunswick
- Born: 1 September 1785; Ireland
- Died: 3 November 1849 (aged 64); Berkeley Square, London
- Military career
- Allegiance: Great Britain; United Kingdom
- Branch: Royal Navy
- Service years: 1796–1849
- Rank: Rear-Admiral
- Conflicts: French Revolutionary Wars; Action of 21 December 1797; Action of 19 February 1801; Napoleonic Wars; Action of 13 March 1806; Action of 22 January 1809; Invasion of Martinique
- Other work: Whig MP for Helston (1830) and Windsor (1832–1835). Lord of the Admiralty (1830–1834, 1839–1841)

Rear-Admiral Sir Samuel John Brooke Pechell, 3rd Baronet, CB, KCH, FRS (1 September 1785 – 3 November 1849) was a Royal Navy officer and politician who served in the French Revolutionary and Napoleonic Wars. His most important achievements were made while serving as a Lord of the Admiralty, pioneering the science and instruction of rapid and accurate gunnery in the Royal Navy through training facilities and manuals.

In addition to his work at the British Admiralty, Pechell served in the House of Commons for two constituencies and was on good terms with King William IV, who supported his efforts to improve standards of gunnery and returned him to the Admiralty in 1839 after a five-year absence caused by his support for the Whig government. In 1826 he inherited the Pechell Baronetcy from his father, but died childless and the title passed to his brother George.

== Life ==
Pechell was born in Ireland in 1785, the son of Sir Thomas Brooke Pechell and his wife Charlotte. Pechell was well connected in military circles: his father was a senior army officer, as were both his grandfathers, Sir Paul Pechell and Sir John Clavering. His uncle was John Borlase Warren, later to become a senior Royal Navy officer. His younger brother, George Pechell would also become a prominent naval officer. Aged 11, Pechell joined the Royal Navy under the guidance of his uncle, joining HMS Pomone in 1796 during the French Revolutionary Wars. The following year he moved to HMS Phoebe, commanded by Captain Robert Barlow and there remained for the next four years. Under Barlow, Pechell was involved in two significant frigate actions, when Phoebe captured the French frigate Néréide at the action of 21 December 1797 and then the Africaine at the action of 19 February 1801.

For his actions in these engagements, Pechell was highly praised and promoted, following Barlow into HMS Triumph in the aftermath of the Africaine action and then moving to HMS Active during the Peace of Amiens in 1803 as a lieutenant. In January 1806, Pechell joined his uncle's flagship HMS Foudroyant and was present at the defeat of the French squadron under Admiral Charles Linois at the action of 13 March 1806. In April 1807, Pechell was given his first independent command, in charge of the brig HMS Ferret operating from Jamaica. In June 1808, he was promoted to post captain and took command of the frigate HMS Cleopatra, in which he joined the squadron being assembled at Barbados for operations against the French islands of Martinique and Guadeloupe. It was while blockading the latter that he served in his most celebrated battle, the action of 22 January 1809. The French frigate Topaze had been forced to take shelter under a gun battery off Pointe-Noire, Guadeloupe, but had been spotted by Pechell's blockade force. Despite fire from the shore, Pechell attacked immediately and brought Cleopatra close inshore to engage Topaze from close range. Pechell's dispositions were so good that Topaze was soon unable to respond, and the arrival of two other Royal Navy ships allowed him to bring his prize out of the bay successfully.

The following month, Cleopatra performed a supporting role in the successful invasion of Martinique and later in the year the ship returned to European waters, Pechell briefly moving to HMS Guerriere before returning to Cleopatra in 1811, operating in the North Sea and off Gibraltar. In 1812, Pechell became captain of Warren's flagship HMS San Domingo, the flagship of the North America Station during the War of 1812. Pechell did not see any action and returned to Britain in 1814. The following year the war ended and Pechell entered semi-retirement, being made a Companion of the Order of the Bath in 1815 for his services during the Napoleonic Wars.

In 1823 he returned to active service aboard the frigate HMS Sibylle and operated off Algiers and the Peloponnese, following the surge in piracy caused by the Greek War of Independence. In 1826, Sibylle was paid off and Pechell returned home, the death of his father making him a baronet a few months later. He also inherited the additional surname Brooke at his grandmother's request. In 1830 he entered politics, briefly serving as a Whig Member of Parliament for Helston and subsequently elected for Windsor, serving until 1835. In April 1833 he married Julia Maria Petre, daughter of Lord Petre.

His most notable service during the 1830s was his position as one of the Lords of the Admiralty (as Third Naval Lord then Fourth Naval Lord and finally Third Naval Lord again), during which he made determined efforts to impose his enthusiasm and interest in accurate and reliable gunnery training on the rest of the Navy. As a serving captain, Pechell had copied and then adapted the system used by Philip Broke, writing a pamphlet on the topic entitled "Observations upon the Defective Equipment of Ships' Guns". When he was elevated to a position of authority he determined to spread his ideas in the service. Supported by King William IV, who had been a serving naval officer and a keen proponent of gunnery training, Pechell worked with Sir Howard Douglas and Sir William Bowles to establish HMS Excellent, the Royal Navy's first gunnery training ship. He was also involved in the appointment of Sir William Symonds as Surveyor of the Navy. For his work in naval administration, Pechell has been described as "one of the architects of the professional navy of the later nineteenth century."

During his time in office, Pechell was promoted to rear-admiral and made a Knight Commander of the Royal Guelphic Order. He died childless at his home in Berkeley Square, London in November 1849, and was survived by his wife and younger brother, who became the fourth Pechell Baronet.

== See also ==
- O'Byrne, William Richard (1849). "Pechell, Samuel John Brooke" . A Naval Biographical Dictionary . John Murray – via Wikisource.

== Notes ==
Parliament of the United Kingdom
| Preceded by Marquess of Carmarthen; Lord James Townshend | Member of Parliament for Helston; 1830–1831; With: Lord James Townshend | Succeeded by Sackville Walter Lane-Fox; Lord James Townshend |
| Preceded by Edward Stanley; John Ramsbottom | Member of Parliament for Windsor; 1832–1835; With: John Ramsbottom | Succeeded by Sir John Edmund de Beauvoir; John Ramsbottom |
Military offices
| New post | Third Naval Lord; 1830–1834 | Succeeded by Sir Charles Rowley |
| Preceded by Sir Maurice Berkeley | Fourth Naval Lord; 1839–1841 | Succeeded by Sir James Dundas |
| Preceded by Sir Edward Troubridge | Third Naval Lord; 1841 | Succeeded by Sir George Seymour |
Baronetage of Great Britain
| Preceded by Thomas Pechell | Baronet (of Paglesham); 1826–1849 | Succeeded by George Pechell |
