= Pechell baronets =

- Escutcheon of the Pechell baronets of Paglesham
- Creation date: 1797
- Status: extinct
- Extinction date: 1984
- Motto: Vix ea nostra voco, I scarcely call these things our own

The Pechell, later Brooke-Pechell, later Pechell baronetcy, of Paglesham in the County of Essex, was a title in the Baronetage of Great Britain, was created on 1 March 1797 for the army officer Paul Pechell (1724–1800), initially with the 1st Royal Dragoons. The 2nd Baronet was also an army officer; the 3rd and 4th Baronets rose to flag rank in the Royal Navy. The 2nd Baronet's mother was the heir of Thomas Brooke of Paglesham, Essex, and he took by royal licence the additional surname of Brooke.

The 2nd Baronet was Member of Parliament for Downton as a client of the Earl of Radnor. The 3rd Baronet sat for Helston from 1830 to 1831, and for New Windsor from 1832 to 1834; the 4th Baronet was member for Brighton.

The 7th Baronet was a Surgeon and a Lieutenant-Colonel in the Royal Army Medical Corps, serving during the Third Anglo-Burmese War and later at the Royal Hospital, Chelsea during World War I. The 8th Baronet served with the Essex Regiment during World War I, and was awarded the Military Cross for gallantry in the Field. The 8th and 9th Baronets used the surname Pechell only. On the death of the 9th Baronet on 29 January 1984 the baronetcy became extinct.

== Pechell, later Brooke-Pechell, later Pechell baronets, of Paglesham (1797) ==
- Sir Paul Pechell, 1st Baronet (1724–1800)
- Sir Thomas Brooke-Pechell, 2nd Baronet (1753–1826)
- Sir Samuel John Brooke-Pechell, 3rd Baronet (1785–1849)
- Sir George Richard Brooke-Pechell, 4th Baronet (1789–1860)
- Sir George Samuel Brooke-Pechell, 5th Baronet (1819–1897)
- Sir Samuel George Brooke-Pechell, 6th Baronet (1852–1904)
- Sir Augustus Alexander Brooke-Pechell MB, 7th Baronet (1857–1937)
- Sir Paul Pechell MC, 8th Baronet (1889–1972)
- Sir Ronald Horace Pechell, 9th Baronet (1918–1984), left no heir.

== Background ==
The Pechells (originally de Pechels) were a noble Huguenot family, and in the late 17th century after severe persecution Samuel Pechell (b.1644) and his family fled for Geneva. After Samuel’s later escape from French captivity in the Caribbean that was aided by the British, he joined his family at Owenstown in County Kildare; as a cavalry officer he received a pension from King William III. The family later moved to England and on 21 November 1705, a petition was made to Queen Anne’s parliament for the naturalisation of Samuel's son, Jacob Pechell (for de Péchels), which was granted. His son Paul was the 1st Baronet.

== Extended family ==
- George Douglas Brooke-Pechell, son of the 7th Baronet, was killed on 21 December 1916 while flying. He was at Filton Aerodrome in Gloucestershire, attached to 66 Squadron, Royal Flying Corps as a Lieutenant.
- Gladys May Mabel Brooke-Pechell, daughter of the 7th Baronet, married in 1913 Bonamy Dobrée. As Valentine Dobrée, she was part of the Bloomsbury Group in the 1920s, known as a poet, painter and writer.

Baronetage of Great Britain
Preceded by Hayes baronets	Pechell baronets of Paglesham; 1 March 1797	Succeeded by Thompson baronets
