= Valentine Dobrée =

Visual artist, novelist and poet (1894–1974)

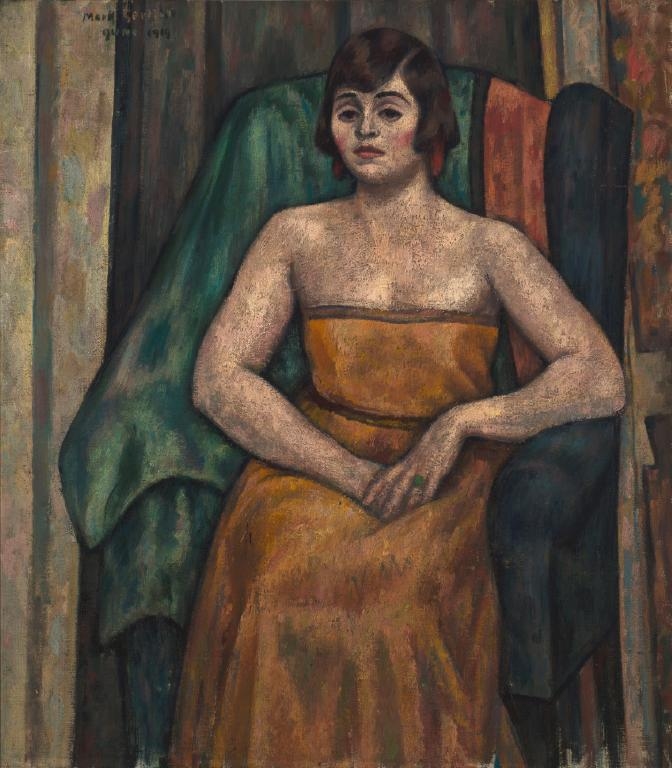
- portrait by Mark Gertler, 1919
- Born: Gladys May Mabel Brooke-Pechell; 1894; Cannanore, British India
- Died: 14 May 1974 (age 79–80)
- Other names: Clare Bollard (Note: Name used by Michael Holroyd, David Garnett and Gerald Brenan in their writings to preserve her anonymity.)
- Occupations: Visual artist, novelist, poet
- Spouse: Bonamy Dobrée (m. 1913)
- Children: Georgina

Valentine Dobrée (1894–1974) was a visual artist (oil painting and collage), novelist and poet.

== Life and work ==
Gladys May Mabel Brooke-Pechell was born in Cannanore, India, the daughter of Lieutenant Colonel Sir (Augustus) Alexander Brooke-Pechell, 7th Baronet, who was a Surgeon in the Army Medical Department, the Royal Army Medical Corps and later at the Royal Hospital Chelsea during the Great War. She moved to England at the age of three. Her only art education was when she was briefly taught by André Derain. After marrying Bonamy Dobrée in 1913 they went to live in Florence, returning to England with the start of World War I.

She exhibited her figurative oil paintings with the London Group in 1920, becoming acquainted with Dora Carrington and Roland Penrose.

In 1920, with Nancy Cunard, she was briefly involved with the bohemian scene in Paris but soon Dobrée and her husband moved to Larrau in the French Pyrenees in 1921 – at this time she exhibited at the Salon des Indépendants. In 1926 they went to live in Cairo where she wrote her novels Your Cuckoo Sings by Kind, published 1927, and The Emperor's Tigers 1929. They returned to England in 1929 to live at Mendham Priory, Harleston, Norfolk where their daughter Georgina, who became a distinguished clarinettist, was born the next year.

Dobrée's first solo exhibition of thirty-four works was at the Claridge Gallery, London, in 1931. Her book of stories To Blush Unseen was published in 1935. The Dobrées in turn lived in Earl's Colne, Essex, and Collingham, West Yorkshire, before returning to London in 1950. The Institute of Contemporary Arts mounted an exhibition of her collages in 1963 and in 1965 her book of poetry This Green Tide was published by Faber and Faber. T. S. Eliot and Graham Greene admired her writing. The University Gallery, Leeds own some of her paintings and they held a retrospective exhibition in 2000.

Fine art collage, a 20th-century innovation, was a technique she used in the years around 1930 and her work was highly regarded – Herbert Read owned some of her art. The Times reported on 9 December 1931 'Her designs, mostly cut out of patterned wallpapers, are definitely and very intelligently "cubist"'. Due to poor health and World War II her output became reduced but in the 1960s she returned to collage, albeit from her bed, and held exhibitions at the Zwemmer Gallery.

On the death of her father, Lieutenant Colonel Sir Alexander Brooke-Pechell Bt. on 6 October 1937, Gladys May Mabel (Dobrée) was left just over £10,000.

== Involvement with Bloomsbury Group ==
Dobrée was vivacious, voluptuous and unstable and, as she encountered members of the Bloomsbury Group, some Bloomsberries became particularly attracted to her. She and her husband had an open marriage – he accepted her extramarital affairs. She became Mark Gertler's lover and he painted portraits of her in 1919 and 1920. Dora Carrington had met her at the Slade School of Art and when they met again much later in 1920 she found her unconventional and independent as well as artistic – the sort of woman Carrington admired. Lytton Strachey found her interesting (despite her marriage he thought her "perhaps a saph") but did not think she was clever.

In 1922 Dobrée's indiscretion started "The Great Row" (as it was later called by Frances Partridge) amongst the ménage à trois of Strachey, Carrington and her husband Ralph Partridge. Carrington, only recently married to Ralph Partridge, was having an occasional rather chaste affair with Gerald Brenan. She was keeping it secret from her husband who was openly having affairs with a number of other women. Dobrée told Ralph that while he and his wife had been staying at the Dobrées' house in the Pyrenees, she had agreed to distract him so Carrington could be alone with Brenan. Partridge became enraged with his wife when she initially denied the story – he regarded her deceit as more shameful than his infidelity. Despite attempts to calm matters by Strachey and Virginia Woolf, the marriage was damaged although they continued together for some time with Carrington having to accept that Dobrée had now also started an affair with her (Carrington's) husband and then, later, with Brenan.
