= Thompson baronets =

Set index for Thompson baronets

There have been seven baronetcies created for persons with the surname Thompson, one in the Baronetage of England, one in the Baronetage of Great Britain and five in the Baronetage of the United Kingdom. Three of the creations are extinct while four are extant.

- Thompson baronets of Haversham (1673): see Baron Haversham
- Thompson baronets of Virkees (1797)
- Thompson baronets of Hartsbourne Manor (1806)
- Thompson baronets of Park Gate (1890)
- Thompson baronets of Wimpole Street (1899)
- Thompson baronets of Reculver (1963)
- Thompson baronets of Walton-on-the-Hill (1963)

== See also ==
- Thomson baronets
- Meysey-Thompson baronets
